= Milan Triennial =

Italian art and design exhibition

The Milan Triennial (Triennale di Milano) is an art and design exhibition that takes place every three years at the Triennale di Milano Museum in Milan, Italy.

== History ==
The exhibition was originally established in 1923 as a biennial architecture and industrial design event. The first five editions took place in Monza. In 1933 the exhibition was relocated to Milan and the format was changed to a triennial basis. The designated venue was the new Palazzo dell’Arte designed by architect Giovanni Muzio, featuring Gio Ponti's Torre Branca.

The Triennial was recognised by the Bureau of International Expositions (BIE) in 1933.

With Ponti and artist Mario Sironi at the helm, the 5th Triennale expanded its field to visual art, with mural paintings made by artists such as Giorgio de Chirico, Massimo Campigli and Carlo Carrà.

Other artists who exhibited their work at the Triennial over the years include Lucio Fontana, Enrico Baj, Arturo Martini, Gio Pomodoro, Alberto Burri, Mario Merz, Giulio Paolini and Michelangelo Pistoletto.

The Triennial was discontinued three times in 1940, 1973 and 1996.

== List of triennials ==
BIE?	Triennial	Notes	Open	Close
	Monza Biennial	International Exhibition of Decorative Arts	1923	1923
	Monza Biennial II	International Exhibition of Decorative Arts	1925
	Monza Biennial III	International Exhibition of Decorative Arts; The twentieth century and Neoclassicism in decoration and furnishing	31 May 1927	16 October 1927
	Monza Biennial IV	International Exhibition of Modern Decorative and Industrial Art; Held in Monza. Included several works by Gio Ponti.	1930	1930
	Milan Triennial V	Style – Civilisation	10 May 1933	31 October 1933
	Milan Triennial VI	Continuity – Modernity	31 May 1936	1 November 1936
	Milan Triennial VII	Order – Tradition	6 April 1940	9 June 1940
	Milan Triennial VIII	The House; Included an urban planning project that led to the QT8 area named after this the 8th triennial.	31 May 1947	14 September 1947
	Milan Triennial IX	Goods – Standards; Gold medal winners included the Danish textile artist Helga Foght.	12 May 1951	5 November 1951
	Milan Triennial X	Prefabrication – Industrial Design; Led to the creation of the building now used as the Bar Bianco	28 August 1954	15 November 1954
	Milan Triennial XI	Improving the Quality of Expression in Today’s Civilisation	27 July 1957	4 November 1957
	Milan Triennial XII	Home and school	16 July 1960	4 November 1960
	Milan Triennial XIII	Leisure	12 June 1964	27 September 1964
	Milan Triennial XIV	The Large Number	23 June 1968	28 July 1968
	Milan Triennial XV	Architettura Razionale, major section curated by Aldo Rossi	1973
	Milan Triennial XVI	The Domestic Project Directed by Mario Bellini and the historian Georges Teyssot. Included notable projects like La Casa Palestra by OMA, The Mobile Home and the Nomadic Condition by John Hejduk, and The Collector's Room by Massimo Scolari	1986
	Milan Triennial XVII	World Cities and the Future of the Metropolis	21 September 1988	18 December 1988
	Milan Triennial XVIII	Life in Things and Nature: Design and the Environmental Challenge	1992	1992
	Milan Triennial XIX	Identities and differences	22 February 1996	5 May 1996
	Milan Triennial XX	Memory and the Future	2001	2004
	Triennial 2016	21st century. Design after Design	2 April 2016	12 September 2016
	Triennial 2019	Broken Nature: Design Takes on Human Survival	1 March 2019	1 July 2019
	XXIII Triennale di Milano	Unknown Unknowns. What we don’t know we don’t know.	20 May 2022	20 November 2022
