= Frank Gehry =

Canadian-American architect (1929–2025)

Frank Gehry CC FAIA
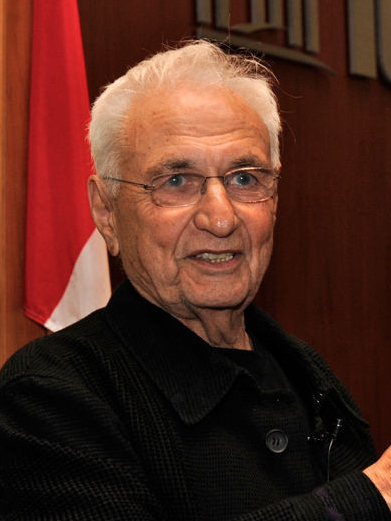
- Gehry in 2010
- Born: Ephraim Owen Goldberg; February 28, 1929; Toronto, Ontario, Canada
- Died: December 5, 2025 (aged 96); Santa Monica, California, U.S.
- Citizenship: Canada; United States
- Education: University of Southern California (B.Arch)
- Occupation: Architect
- Spouses: Anita Snyder (m. 1952; div. 1966) Berta Isabel Aguilera (m. 1975)
- Children: 4
- Awards
- Practice: Gehry Partners, LLP
- Buildings: List of works
- Website: foga.com

Frank Owen Gehry (/ˈɡɛəri/ GAIR-ee; né Goldberg; February 28, 1929 – December 5, 2025) was a Canadian-American architect and designer known for his postmodern designs and use of unconventional forms and materials. A number of his buildings, including his private residence in Santa Monica, California, have become attractions. His most famous works include the Guggenheim Museum Bilbao in Spain, the Walt Disney Concert Hall in Los Angeles, and the Louis Vuitton Foundation in Paris. These buildings are characterized by their sculptural, often undulating exteriors and innovative use of materials such as titanium and stainless steel.

Gehry rose to prominence in the 1970s with his distinctive style that blended everyday materials with complex, dynamic structures. Gehry's approach to architecture was described as deconstructivist, though he resisted categorization. His works are considered among the most important of contemporary architecture in the 2010 World Architecture Survey, leading Vanity Fair to call him "the most important architect of our age".

Throughout his career, Gehry received numerous awards and honors, including the Pritzker Architecture Prize in 1989, considered the field's highest honor. He was also awarded the National Medal of Arts and the Presidential Medal of Freedom in the United States. Gehry's influence extends beyond architecture; he designed furniture, jewelry, liquor bottles, and other products.

== Early life ==
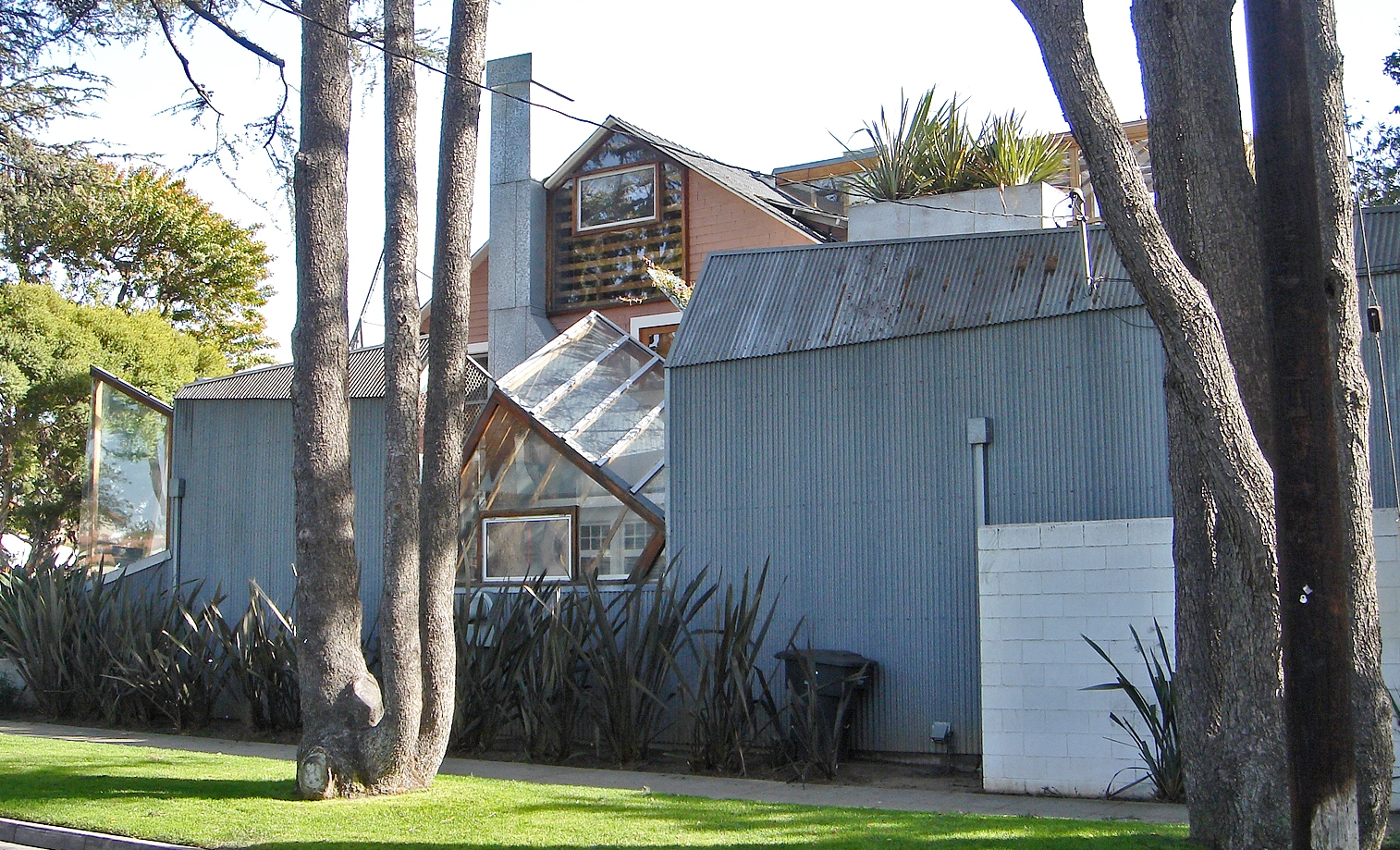
Gehry Residence in Santa Monica, California

Ephraim Owen Goldberg was born on February 28, 1929, at Toronto General Hospital in Toronto, Ontario, to parents Sadie Thelma (née Kaplanski/Caplan) and Irving Goldberg. His American father was born in New York City to Russian-Jewish parents, and his Polish-Jewish mother was an immigrant born in Łódź. A creative child, he was encouraged by his grandmother, Leah Caplan, with whom he built little cities out of scraps of wood. With these scraps from her husband's hardware store, she entertained him for hours, building imaginary houses and futuristic cities on the living room floor.

Gehry's use of corrugated steel, chain-link fencing, unpainted plywood, and other utilitarian or "everyday" materials was partly inspired by spending Saturday mornings at his grandfather's hardware store. He spent time drawing with his father, and his mother introduced him to the world of art. "So the creative genes were there", Gehry said. "But my father thought I was a dreamer, I wasn't gonna amount to anything. It was my mother who thought I was just reticent to do things. She would push me."

He was given the Hebrew name "Ephraim" by his grandfather, but used it only at his bar mitzvah. In 1954, Gehry changed his surname from Goldberg to Gehry, after his then-wife Anita expressed concern about antisemitism.

Gehry and his family moved to the gold mining town of Timmins, Ontario, in 1937 but moved back to Toronto after facing antisemitism.

=== Education ===
In 1947, Gehry's family immigrated to the United States, settling in California. He got a job driving a delivery truck and studied at Los Angeles City College.

Gehry stated,

I was a truck driver in L.A., going to City College, and I tried radio announcing, which I wasn't very good at. I tried chemical engineering, which I wasn't very good at and didn't like, and then I remembered. You know, somehow I just started wracking my brain about, 'What do I like?' Where was I? What made me excited? And I remembered art, that I loved going to museums and I loved looking at paintings, loved listening to music. Those things came from my mother, who took me to concerts and museums. I remembered Grandma and the blocks, and just on a hunch, I tried some architecture classes.

Gehry went on to graduate from the University of Southern California's School of Architecture in 1954, where his professors included William Pereira. During that time, he became a member of Alpha Epsilon Pi. He then spent time away from architecture in numerous other jobs, including service in the United States Army. He moved his family to Cambridge, Massachusetts in the fall of 1956, where he studied city planning at Harvard University's Graduate School of Design using the GI Bill. Gehry has often expressed a broadly socialist philosophy of architecture, something that was influenced by his political views, as he has articulated a more leftist attitude to the world. These progressive ideas about socially responsible architecture were under-realized and not respected by his professors at Harvard, leaving him to feel disheartened and "underwhelmed". Gehry's distaste for the school culminated after he was invited by his architecture professor to engage in a discussion revolving around a "secret architectural project in progress", which was ultimately revealed to Gehry as a palace that he was designing for Cuban dictator Fulgencio Batista.

== Career ==
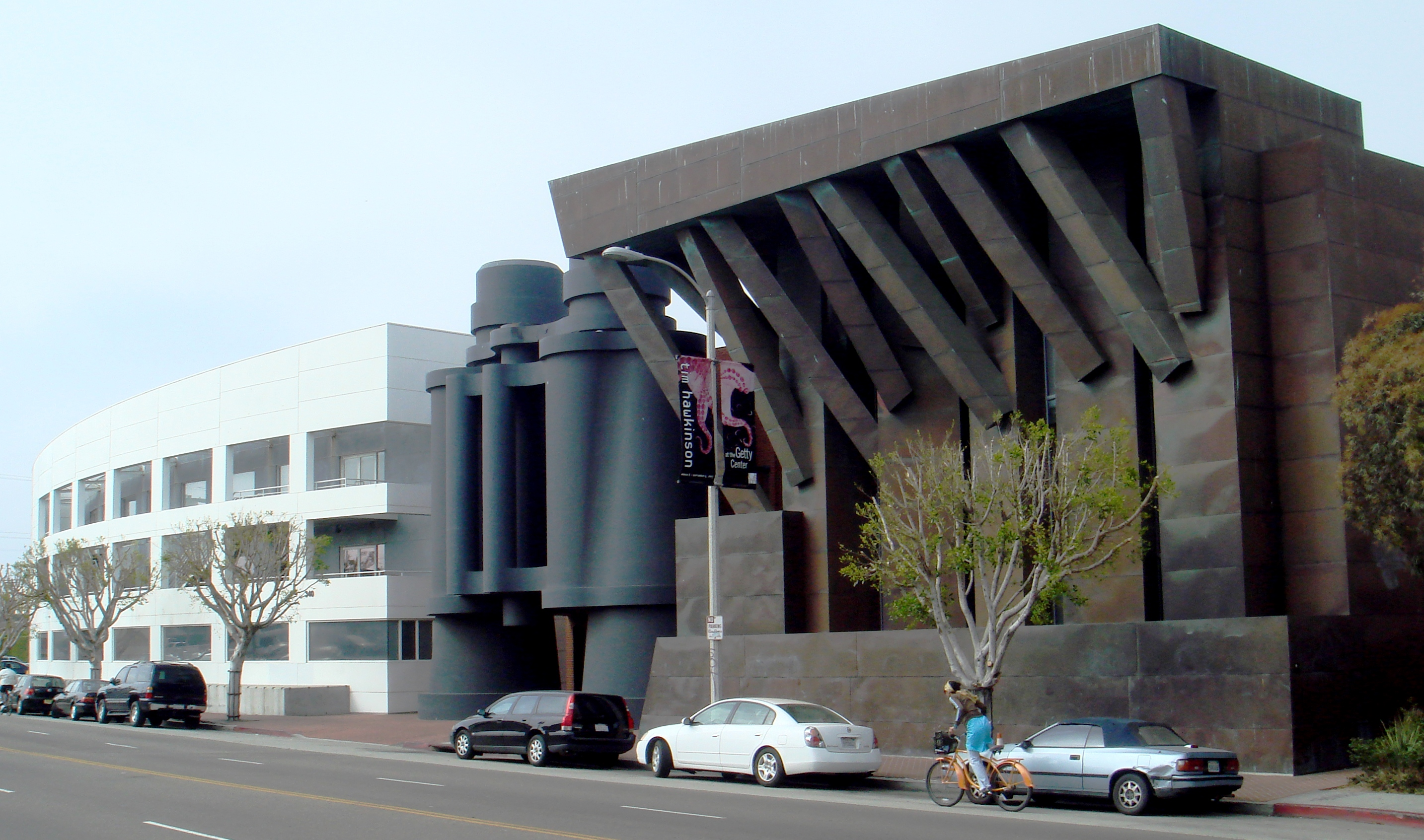
Chiat/Day Building in Venice, California (1991)

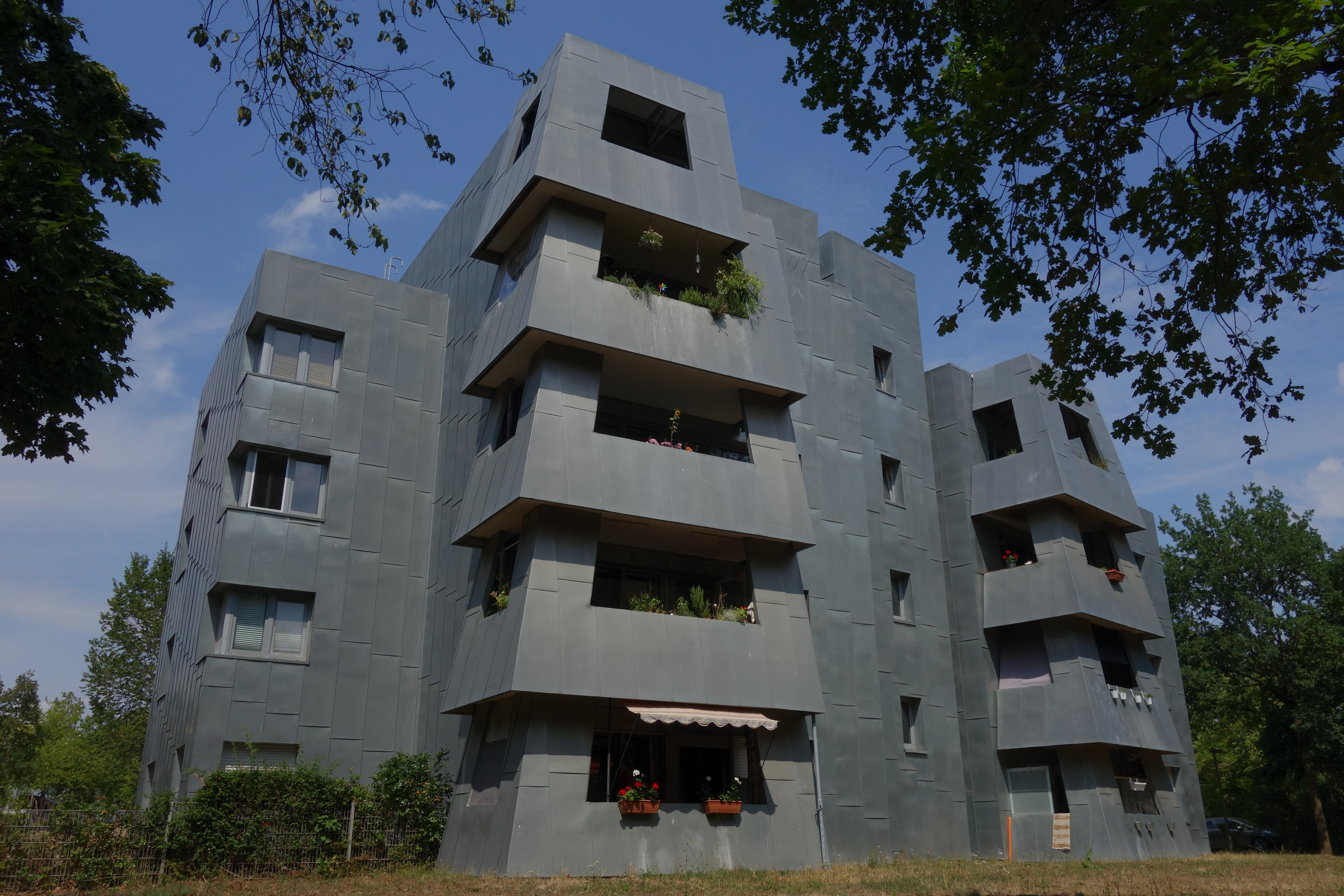
Public housing in Frankfurt-Schwanheim (1994)

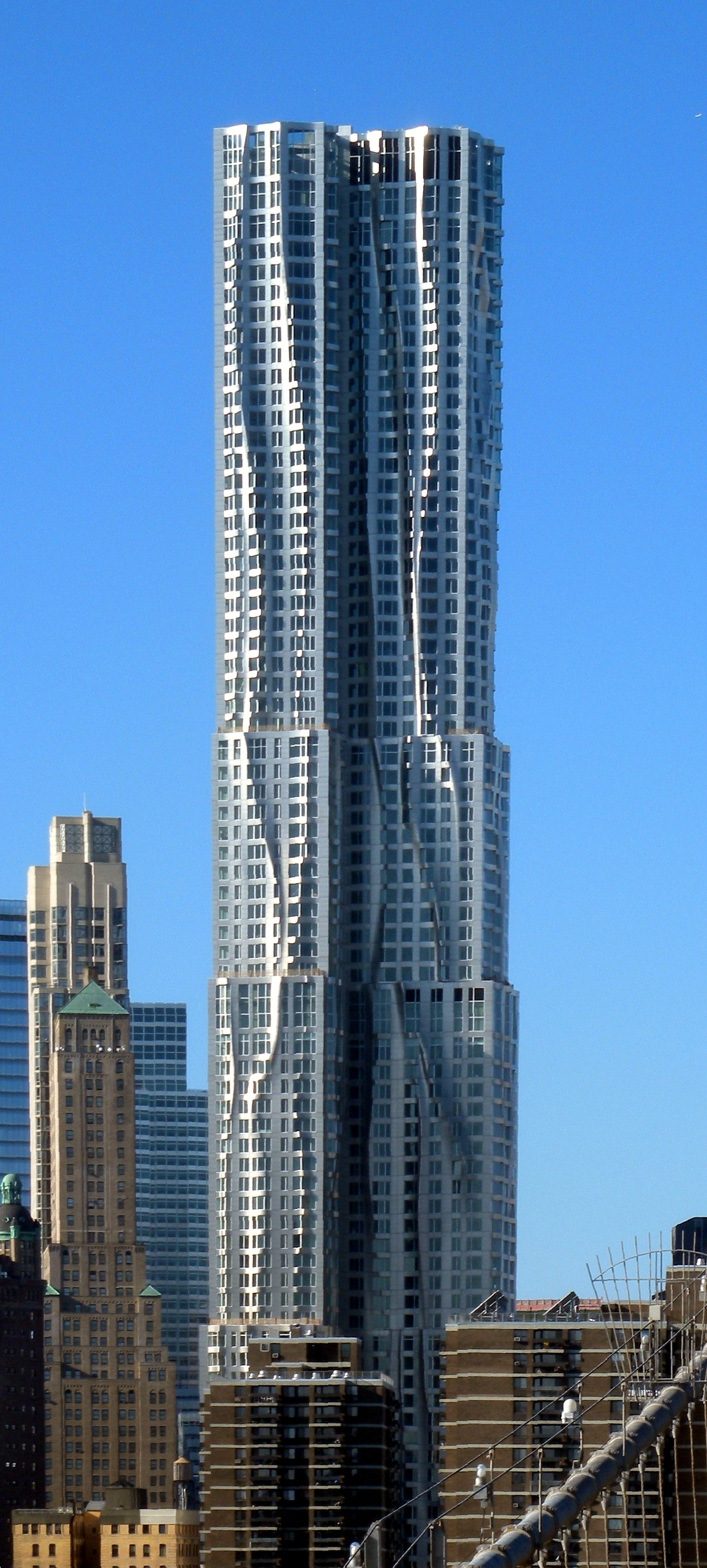
The tower at 8 Spruce Street in Lower Manhattan, completed in 2010, has a stainless steel and glass exterior and is 76 stories high (2010).

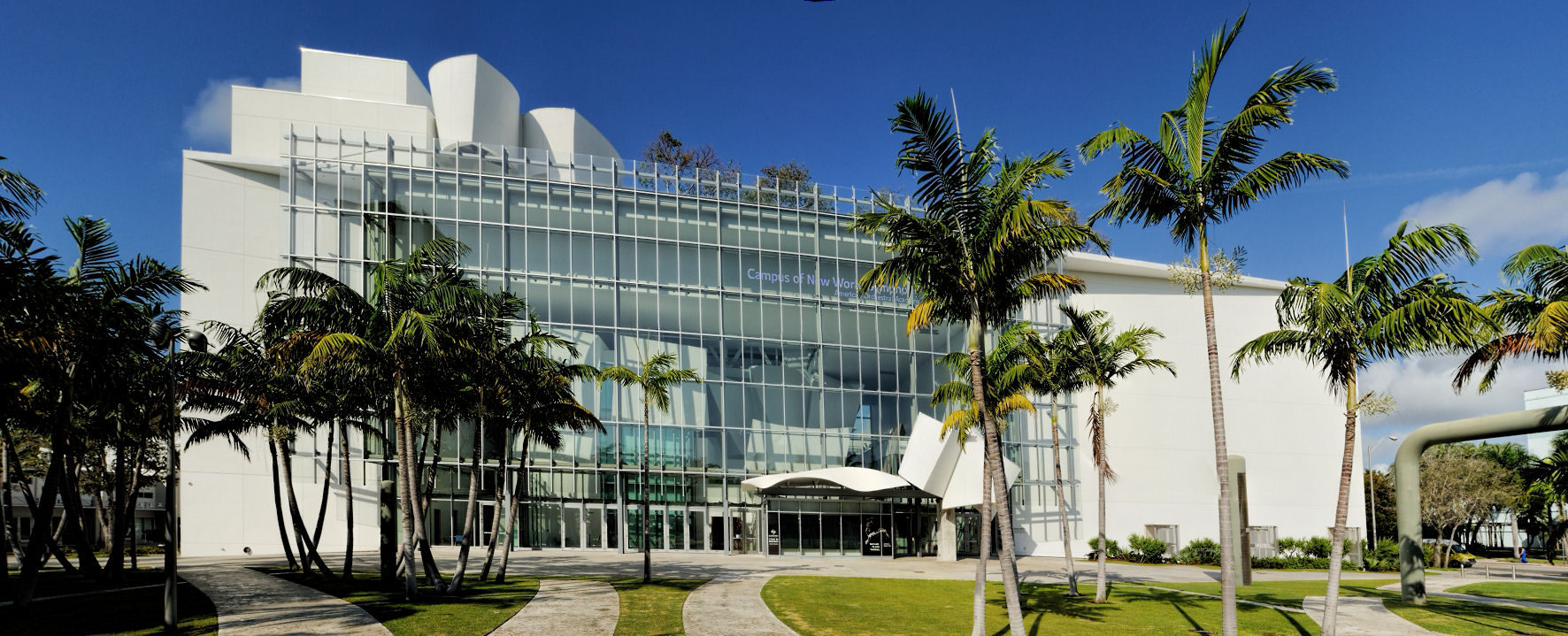
New World Center in Miami Beach, Florida (2011)

Fondation Louis Vuitton (2016)

Gehry ultimately dropped out of his graduate program at Harvard University (where he studied urban planning) to start the furniture manufacturing company Easy Edges, which specialised in creating pieces with cardboard.

He returned to Los Angeles to work for Victor Gruen Associates, with whom he had apprenticed while at USC. In 1957, at age 28, he was given the chance to design his first private residence with friend and old classmate Greg Walsh. Construction was done by another neighbor across the street from his wife's family, Charlie Sockler. Built in Idyllwild, California, for his wife Anita's family neighbor Melvin David, the over 2,000 sq ft (190 m^{2}) "David Cabin" shows features that were to become synonymous with Gehry's later work, including beams protruding from the exterior sides, vertical-grain douglas fir detail, and exposed unfinished ceiling beams. It also shows strong Asian influences, stemming from his earliest inspirations, such as the Shōsōin in Nara, Japan.

In 1961, Gehry moved to Paris, where he worked for architect Andre Remonde. In 1962, he established a practice in Los Angeles that became Frank Gehry and Associates in 1967, then Gehry Partners in 2001. His earliest commissions were in Southern California, where he designed a number of innovative commercial structures such as Santa Monica Place (1980) and residential buildings such as the eccentric Norton House (1984) in Venice, Los Angeles.

Among these works, Gehry's most notable design may be the renovation of his own Santa Monica residence. Originally built in 1920 and purchased by Gehry in 1977, it features a metallic exterior wrapped around the original building that leaves many of the original details visible.

Other of Gehry's buildings completed during the 1980s include the Cabrillo Marine Aquarium (1981) in San Pedro, and the California Aerospace Museum (1984) at the California Museum of Science and Industry in Los Angeles.

In 1989, Gehry received the Pritzker Architecture Prize, where the jury described him: "Always open to experimentation, he has as well a sureness and maturity that resists, in the same way that Picasso did, being bound either by critical acceptance or his successes. His buildings are juxtaposed collages of spaces and materials that make users appreciative of both the theatre and the back-stage, simultaneously revealed."

Gehry continued to design other notable buildings in California, such as the Chiat/Day Building (1991) in Venice, in collaboration with Claes Oldenburg, which is well known for its massive sculpture of binoculars. He also began receiving larger national and international commissions, including his first European commission, the Vitra International Furniture Manufacturing Facility and Design Museum in Germany, completed in 1989. It was soon followed by other major commissions including the Frederick Weisman Museum of Art (1993) in Minneapolis, Minnesota; the Cinémathèque Française (1994) in Paris, originally the American Center in Paris; and the Dancing House in Prague (1996).

From 1994 to 1996 several buildings by Gehry for a public housing project were realized in Goldstein, part of Frankfurt-Schwanheim (1994). In 1997, Gehry vaulted to a new level of international acclaim when the Guggenheim Museum Bilbao opened in Bilbao, Spain. Hailed by The New Yorker as a "masterpiece of the 20th century", and by legendary architect Philip Johnson as "the greatest building of our time", the museum became famous for its striking yet aesthetically pleasing design and its positive economic effect on the city.

From then on, Gehry regularly won major commissions and established himself as one of the world's most notable architects. His best-received works include several concert halls for classical music. The boisterous, curvaceous Walt Disney Concert Hall (2003) in downtown Los Angeles is the centerpiece of the neighborhood's revitalization; the Los Angeles Times called it "the most effective answer to doubters, naysayers, and grumbling critics an American architect has ever produced". Gehry also designed the open-air Jay Pritzker Pavilion (2004) in Chicago's Millennium Park; and the understated New World Center (2011) in Miami Beach, which the LA Times called "a piece of architecture that dares you to underestimate it or write it off at first glance".

His other notable works include academic buildings such as the Stata Center (2004) at MIT, and the Peter B. Lewis Library (2008) at Princeton University; museums such as the Museum of Pop Culture (2000) in Seattle, Washington; commercial buildings such as the IAC Building (2007) in New York City; and residential buildings, such as Gehry's first skyscraper, the Beekman Tower at 8 Spruce Street (now known as 8 Spruce) in New York City (2011).

Gehry's major international works include the Dr Chau Chak Wing Building at the University of Technology Sydney, which was completed in late 2014 and officially opened in February 2015. The A$180 million building, with its façade of more than 320,000 hand-placed bricks and glass slabs in "sweeping lines", was described as "10 out of 10" on a scale of difficulty. Gehry said he would not design a building like the "crumpled paper bag" again. Other of his projects include the Guggenheim Abu Dhabi on Saadiyat Island in the United Arab Emirates and the Forma skyscraper project in his hometown of Toronto. Other significant projects undertaken by Gehry such as a multi-decade renovation of the Philadelphia Museum of Art were in the design stage. In October 2013, Gehry was appointed joint architect with Foster + Partners to design the High Street phase of the development of Battersea Power Station in London, Gehry's first project there.

Some of Gehry's more prominent designs failed to go forward. In addition to unrealized designs for the Corcoran Art Gallery expansion in Washington, DC, and a new Guggenheim museum near the South Street Seaport in New York City, Gehry was notoriously dropped by developer Bruce Ratner from the Pacific Park redevelopment project in the New York City borough of Brooklyn, and in 2014 as the designer of the World Trade Center Performing Arts Center in New York City. Some stalled projects showed progress: After many years and a dismissal, Gehry was reinstated as architect for the Grand Avenue Project in Los Angeles, and though his controversial design of the National Dwight D. Eisenhower Memorial in Washington, DC had numerous delays during the approval process with the United States Congress, it was finally approved in 2014 with a modified design.

In 2014, two significant, long-awaited museums designed by Gehry opened: the Biomuseo, a biodiversity museum in Panama City, Panama; and the Fondation Louis Vuitton, a modern art museum in the Bois de Boulogne park in Paris, France. Both opened to generally positive reviews.

Also in 2014, Gehry was commissioned by River LA (formerly the Los Angeles River Revitalization Corporation), a nonprofit group founded by the city of Los Angeles in 2009 to coordinate river policy, to devise a wide-ranging new plan for the river.

Gehry told the French newspaper La Croix in November 2016 that French president François Hollande had assured him he could relocate to France if Donald Trump was elected President of the United States. In December, Gehry said that he had no plans to move. According to former Canadian prime minister Jean Chrétien, Gehry considered moving back to Canada after Trump was elected to a subsequent term in 2024.

Trump and Gehry had exchanged words in 2010 when Gehry's 8 Spruce Street, originally known as Beekman Tower, was built 1 foot (0.30 m) taller than the nearby Trump Building, which until then was New York City's tallest residential building.

Notable Gehry-designed buildings completed in the 2020s include the Dwight D. Eisenhower Memorial in Washington, DC, and the LUMA Arles museum in France. In 2021, noting Gehry's progress on an increasing number of significant projects in his hometown, including the Grand Avenue Project, a concert hall for the Youth Orchestra Los Angeles, and an office building for Warner Bros., The Architect's Newspaper stated that "Seventy-four years after he moved there from his native Toronto, L.A. is looking more and more like Gehry Country."

== Architectural style ==
Said to "defy categorisation", Gehry's work reflects a spirit of experimentation coupled with a respect for the demands of professional practice, and remained largely unaligned with broader stylistic tendencies or movements. With his earliest educational influences rooted in modernism, Gehry's work sought to escape modernist stylistic tropes while remaining interested in some of its underlying transformative agendas. Continually working between given circumstances and unanticipated materializations, he was assessed as someone who "made us produce buildings that are fun, sculpturally exciting, good experiences", although his approach might become "less relevant as pressure mounts to do more with less".

Gehry's style at times seemed unfinished or even crude, but his work was consistent with the California "funk" art movement of the 1960s and early 1970s, which featured the use of inexpensive found objects and nontraditional media such as clay to make serious art. His works always had at least some element of deconstructivism; he was called "the apostle of chain-link fencing and corrugated metal siding". However, a retrospective exhibit at New York's Whitney Museum in 1988 revealed that he was also a sophisticated classical artist who knew European art history and contemporary sculpture and painting.

=== Design philosophy ===
Gehry described architecture as inherently sculptural, asserting, "I always thought that architecture was, by definition, a three-dimensional object, therefore sculpture." This perspective reflected his commitment to blending artistic and architectural disciplines. Gehry's early work with sculptors influenced his experimental approach, which includes deconstructing traditional architectural forms and embracing ideas of flow and defamiliarization, akin to Viktor Shklovsky's concept of "laying bare the device".

Gehry's Jewish heritage and immigrant background shaped his architectural philosophy. He often reinterpreted traditional forms in ways that reflect his multicultural experience. His works were described as embodying "a critique of consumerism" by defying expectations of luxury and focusing on creativity.

=== Gallery ===
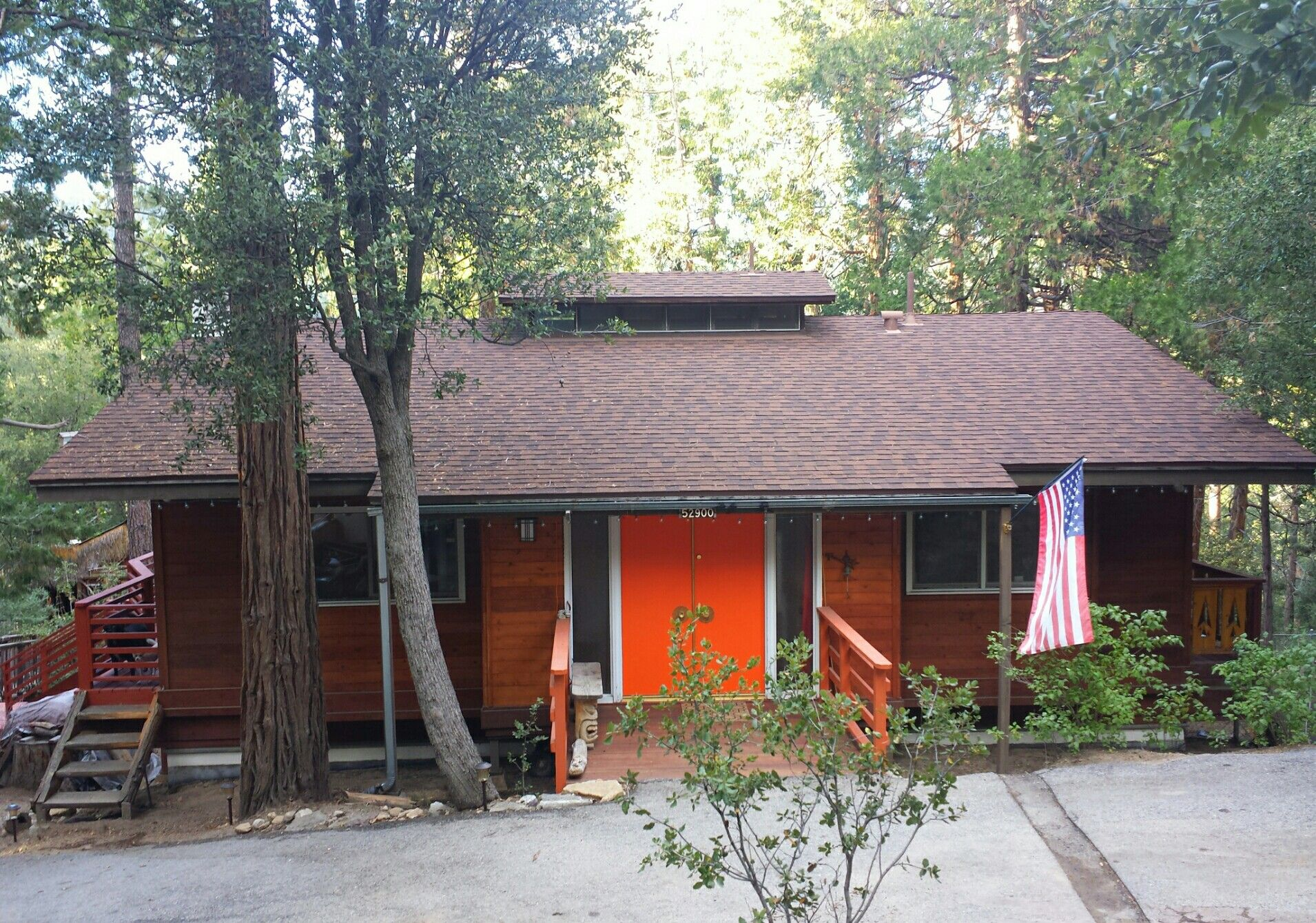
David Cabin – Idyllwild, CA (1957)

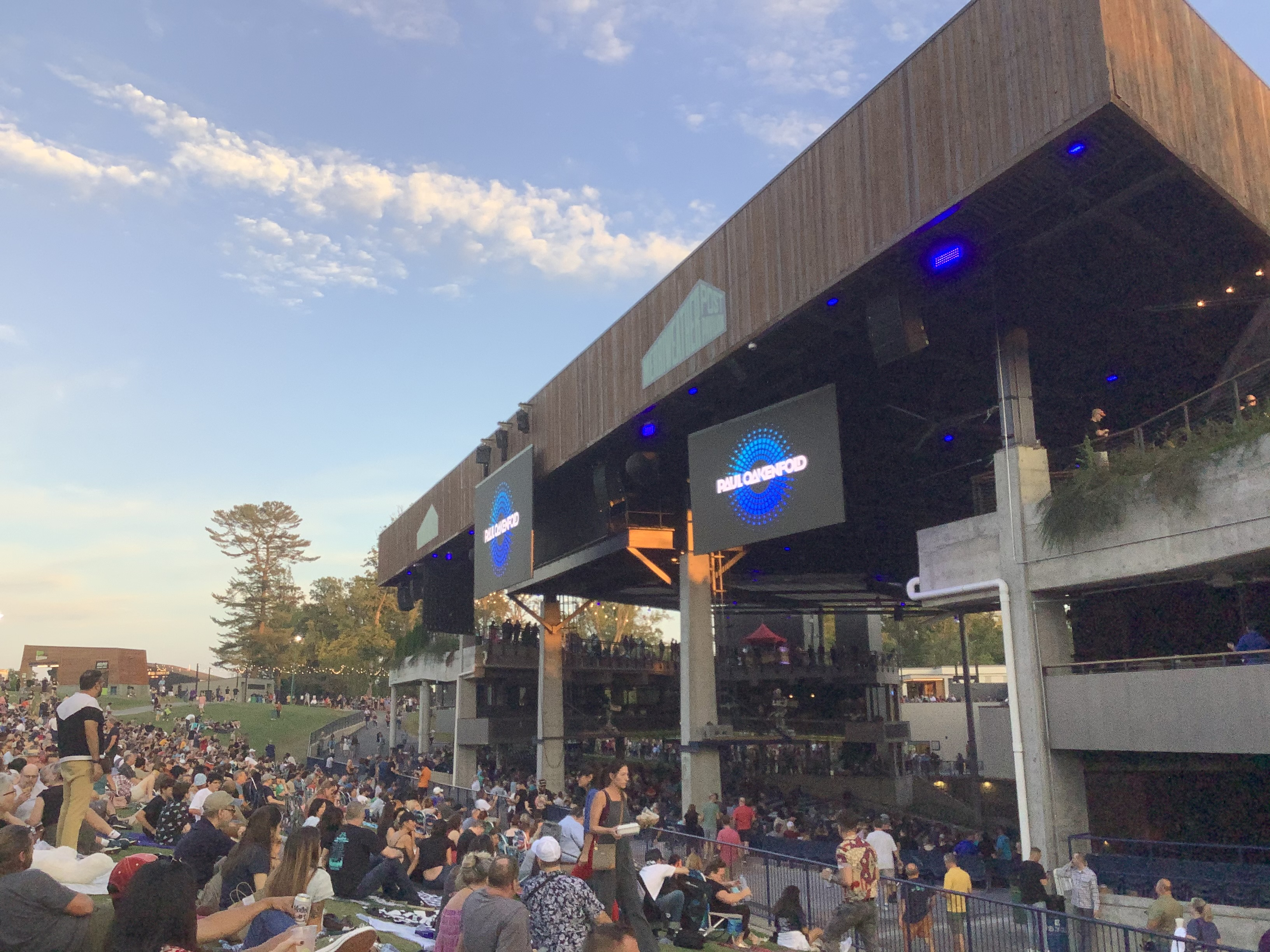
Merriweather Post Pavilion – Columbia, Maryland (1967)

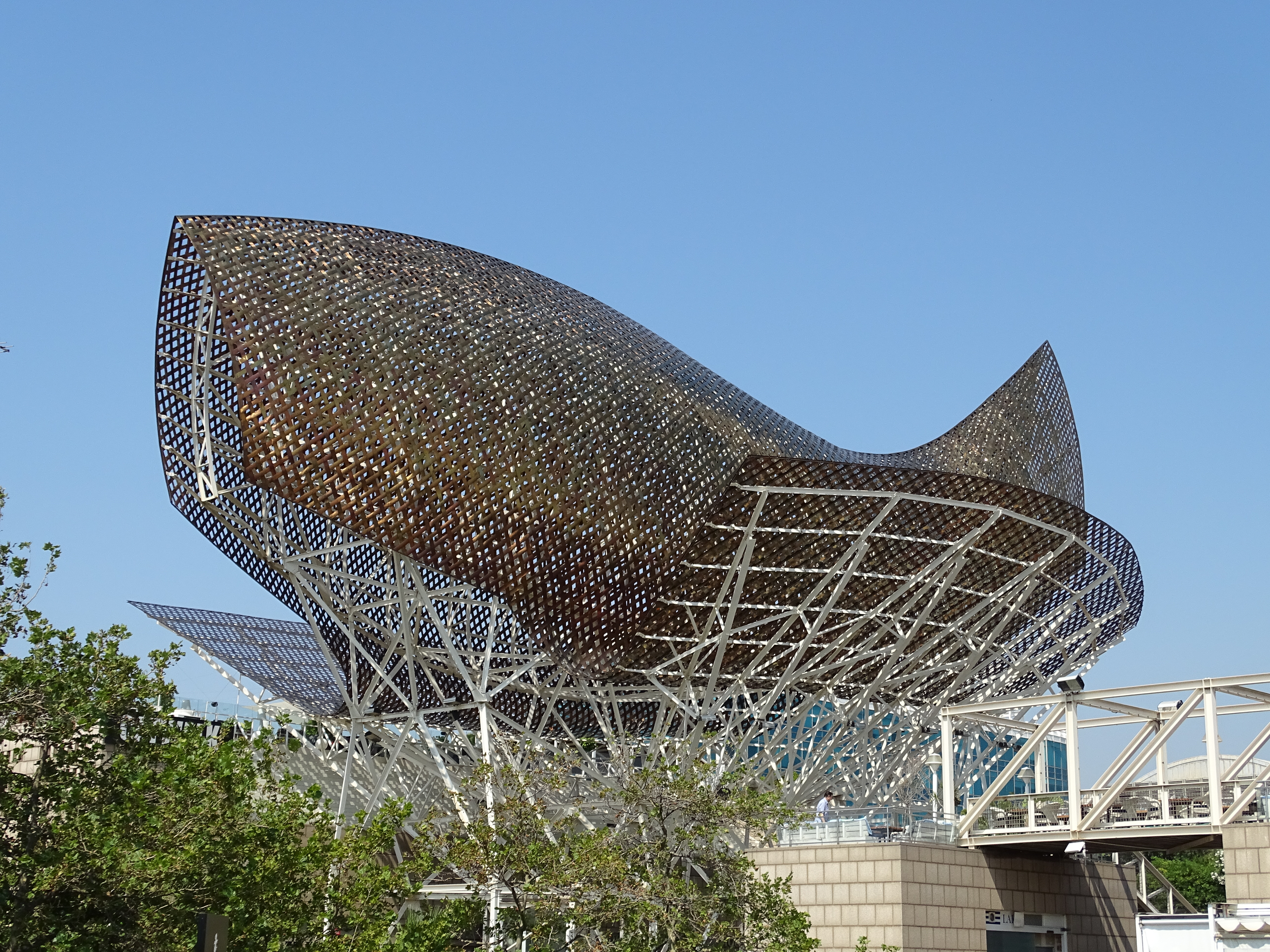
"El Peix", fish sculpture – Port Olímpic, Barcelona (1992)

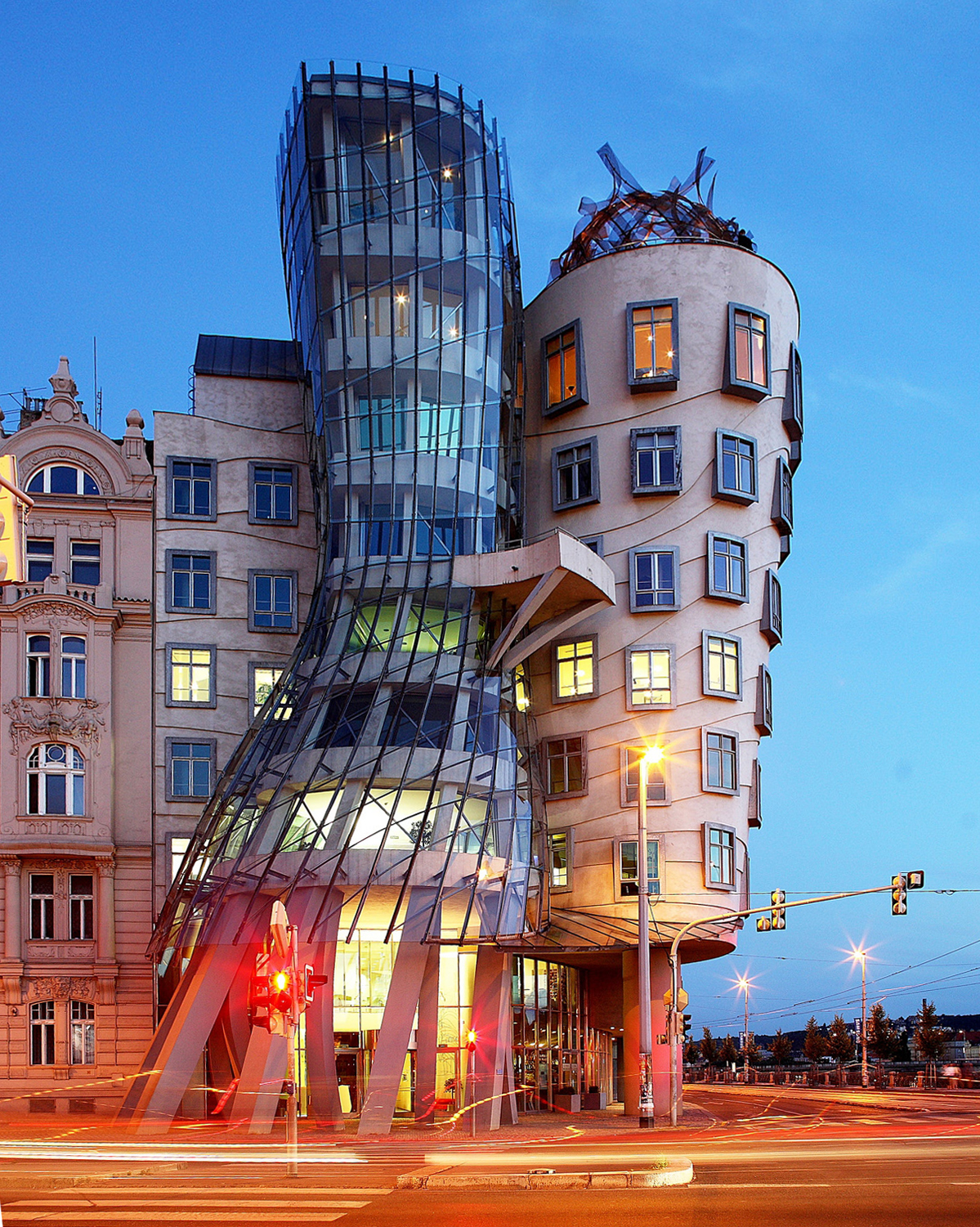
Dancing House – Prague (1996)

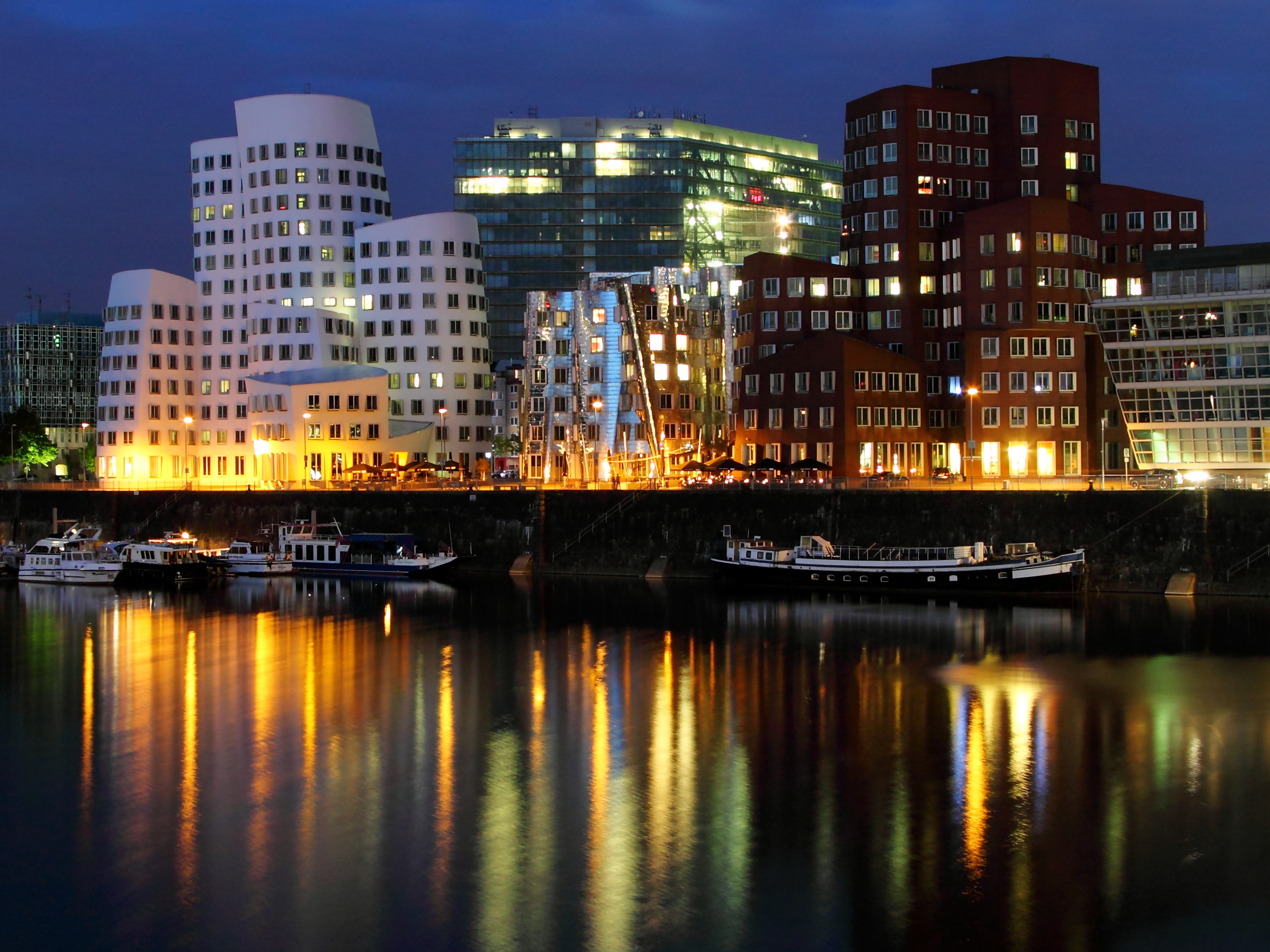
Neuer Zollhof - Düsseldorf (1998)

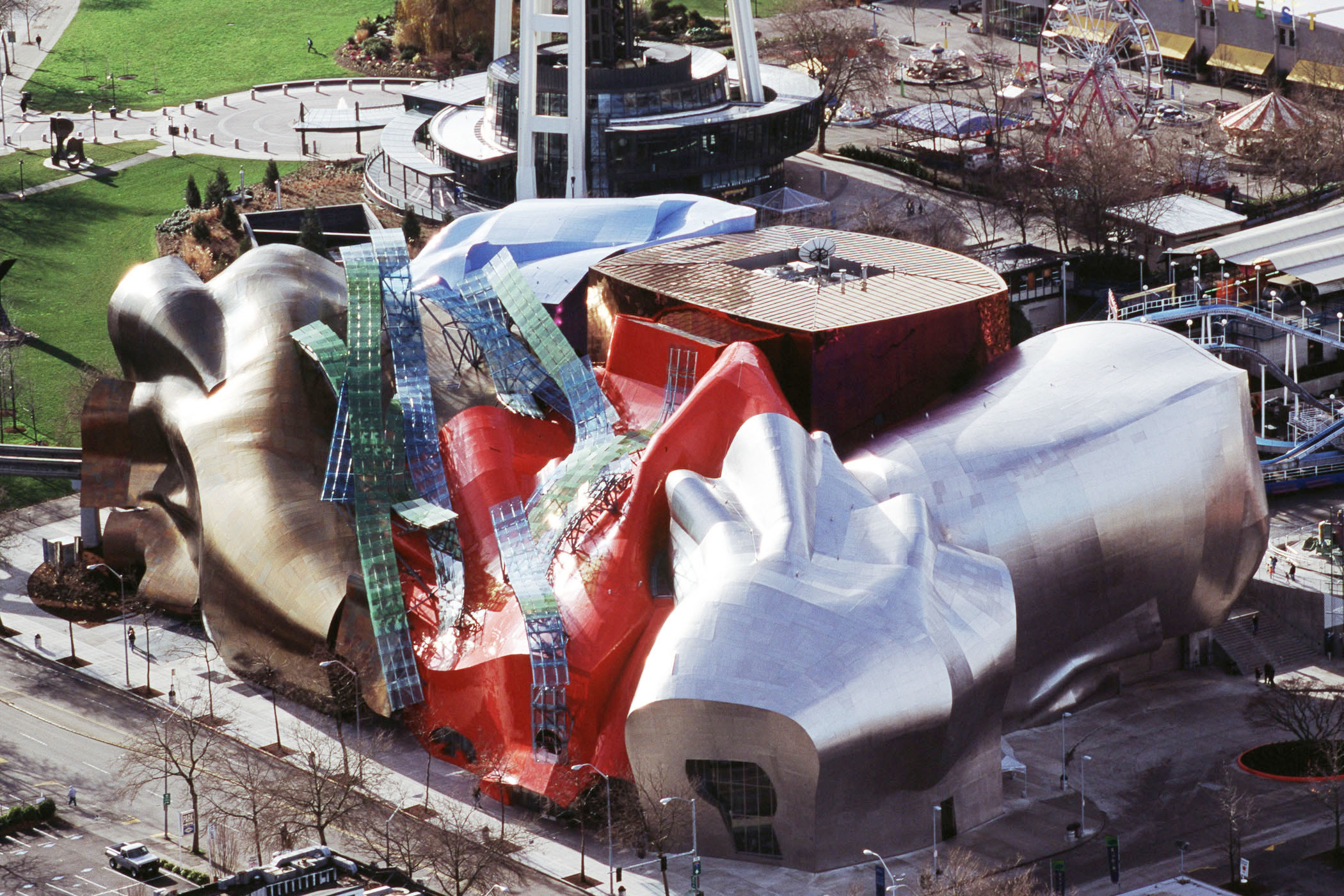
Museum of Pop Culture – Seattle (2000)

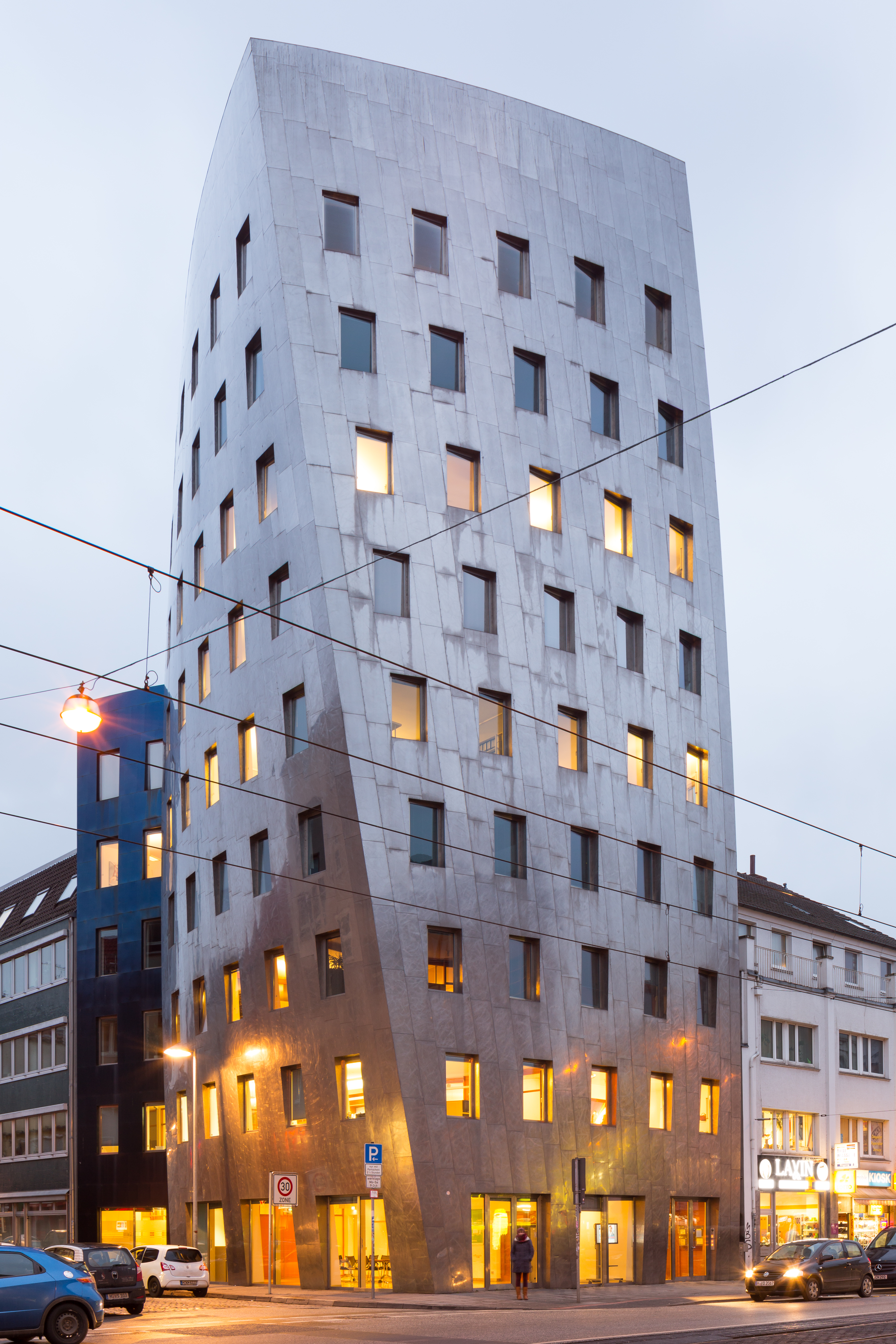
Gehry Tower – Hanover (2001)

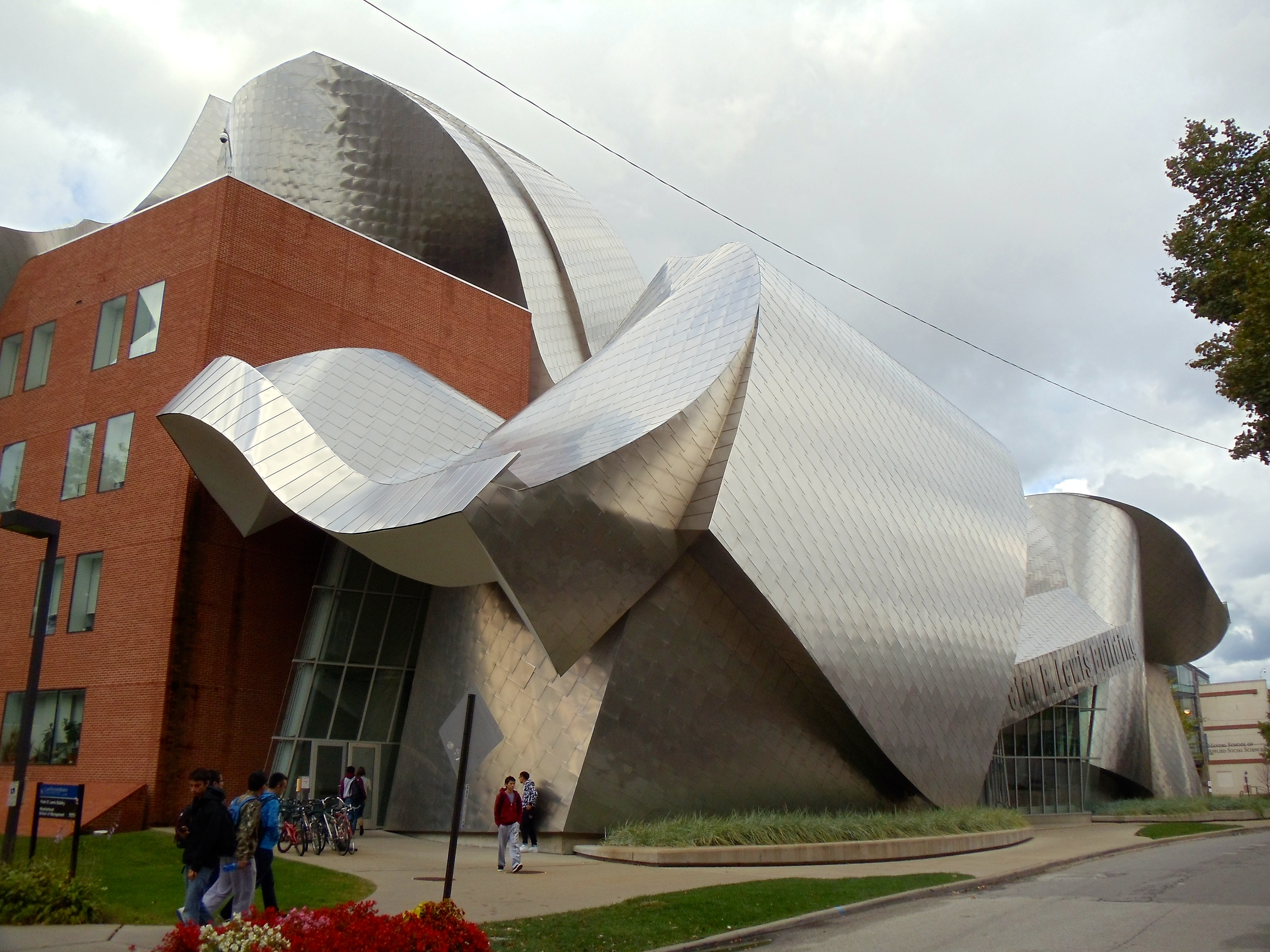
Weatherhead School of Management – Cleveland, Ohio (2002)

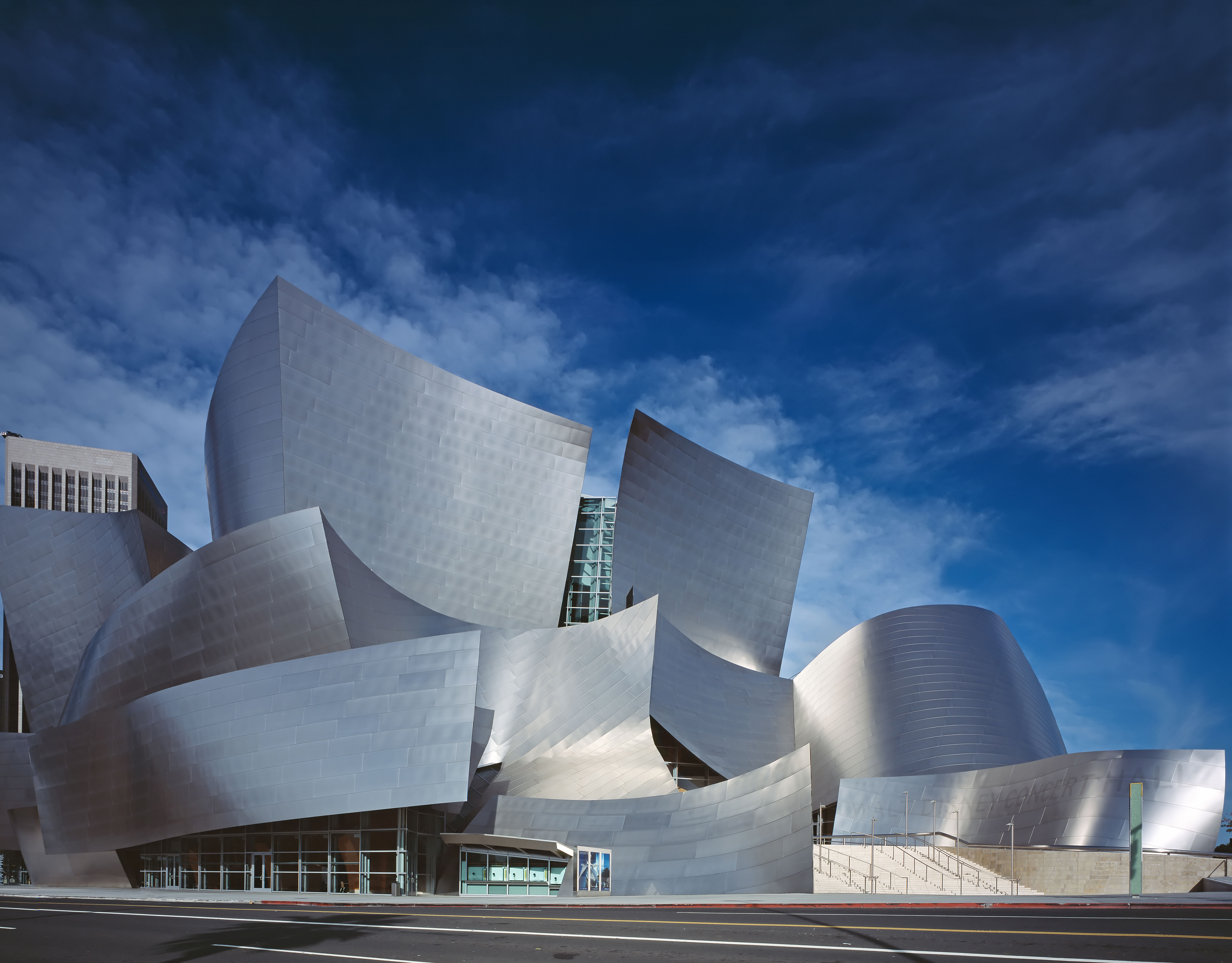
Walt Disney Concert Hall – Los Angeles (2003)

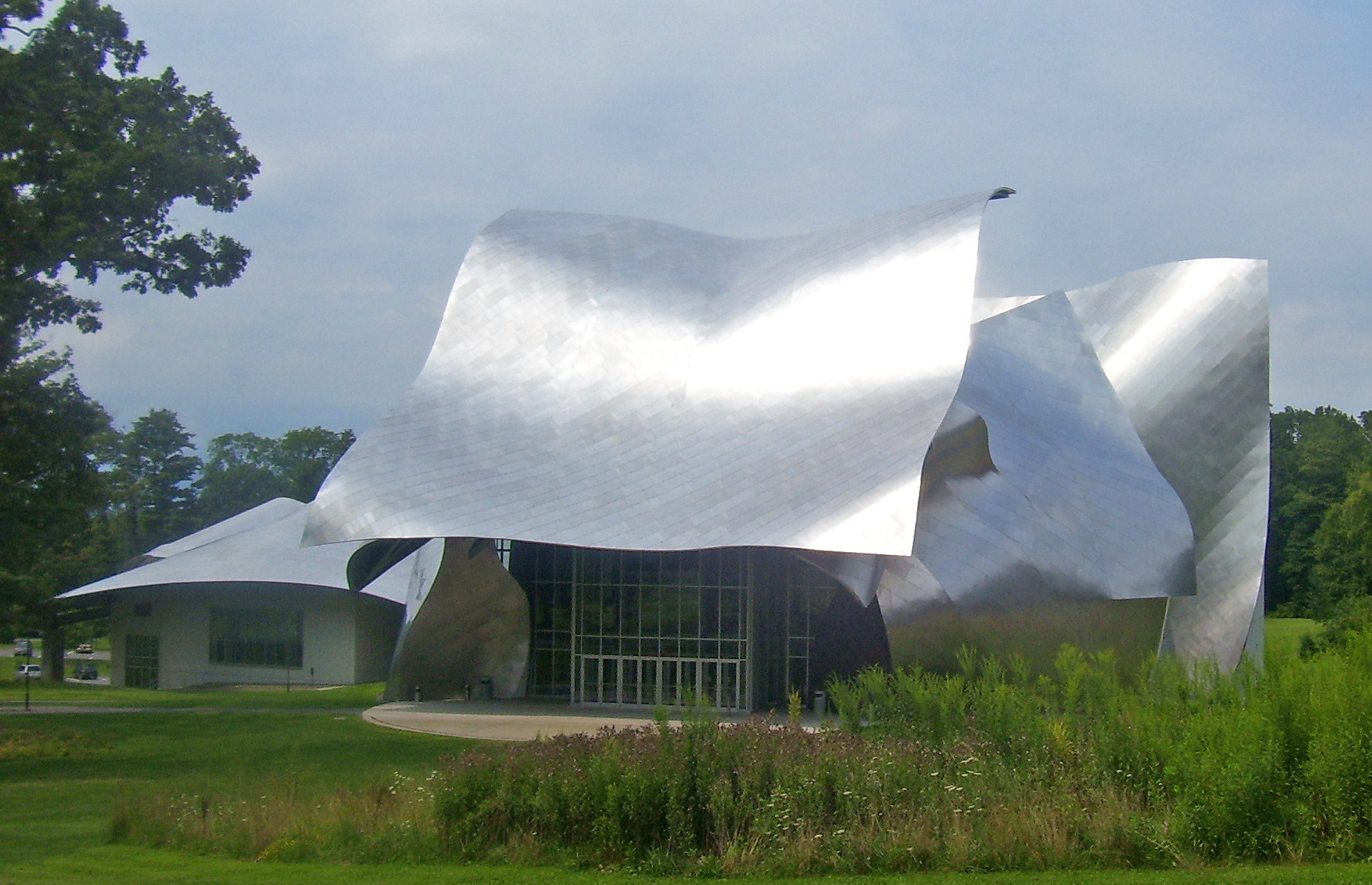
Richard B. Fisher Center – Annandale-on-Hudson, New York (2003)

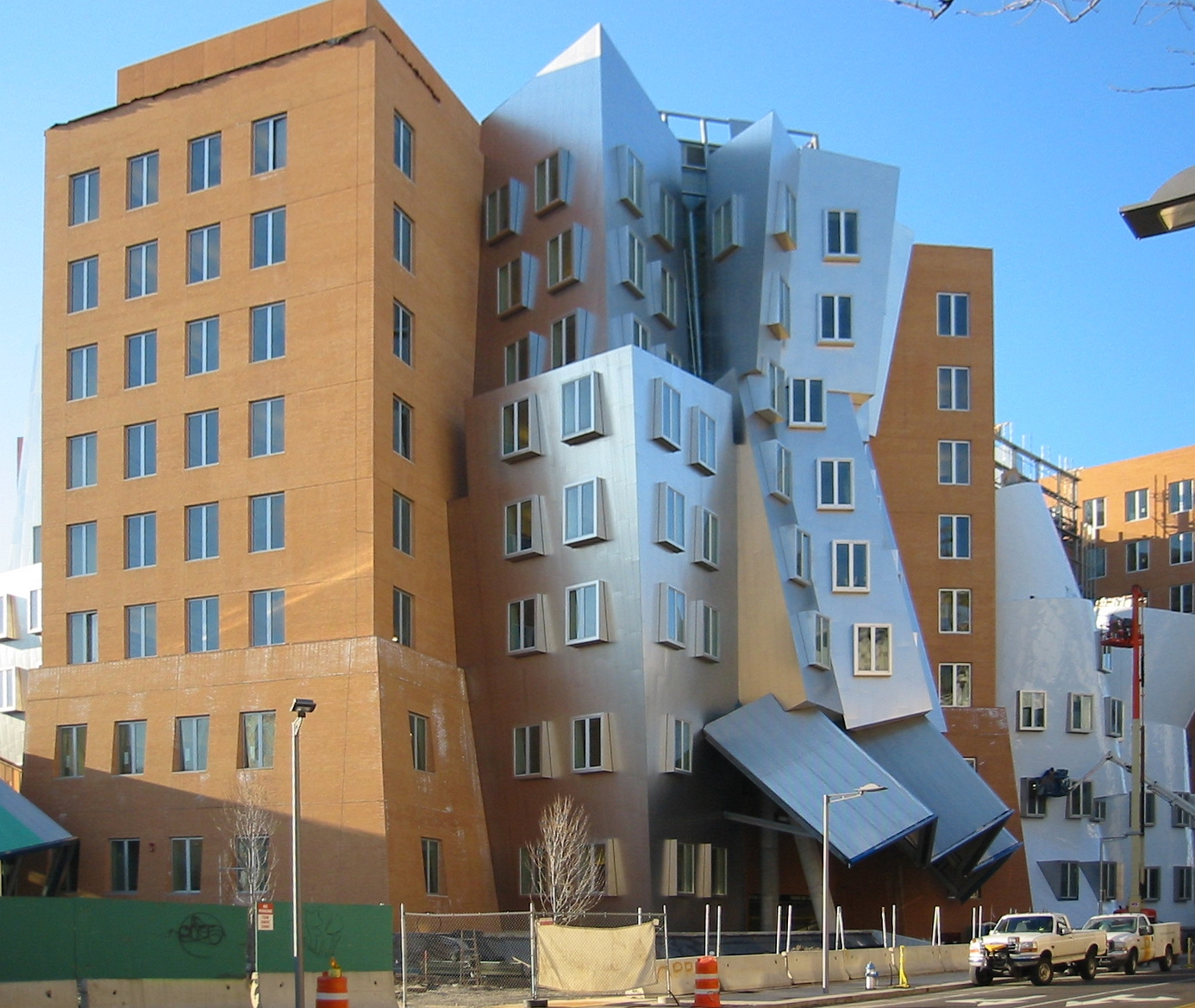
Stata Center – Cambridge, Massachusetts (2004)

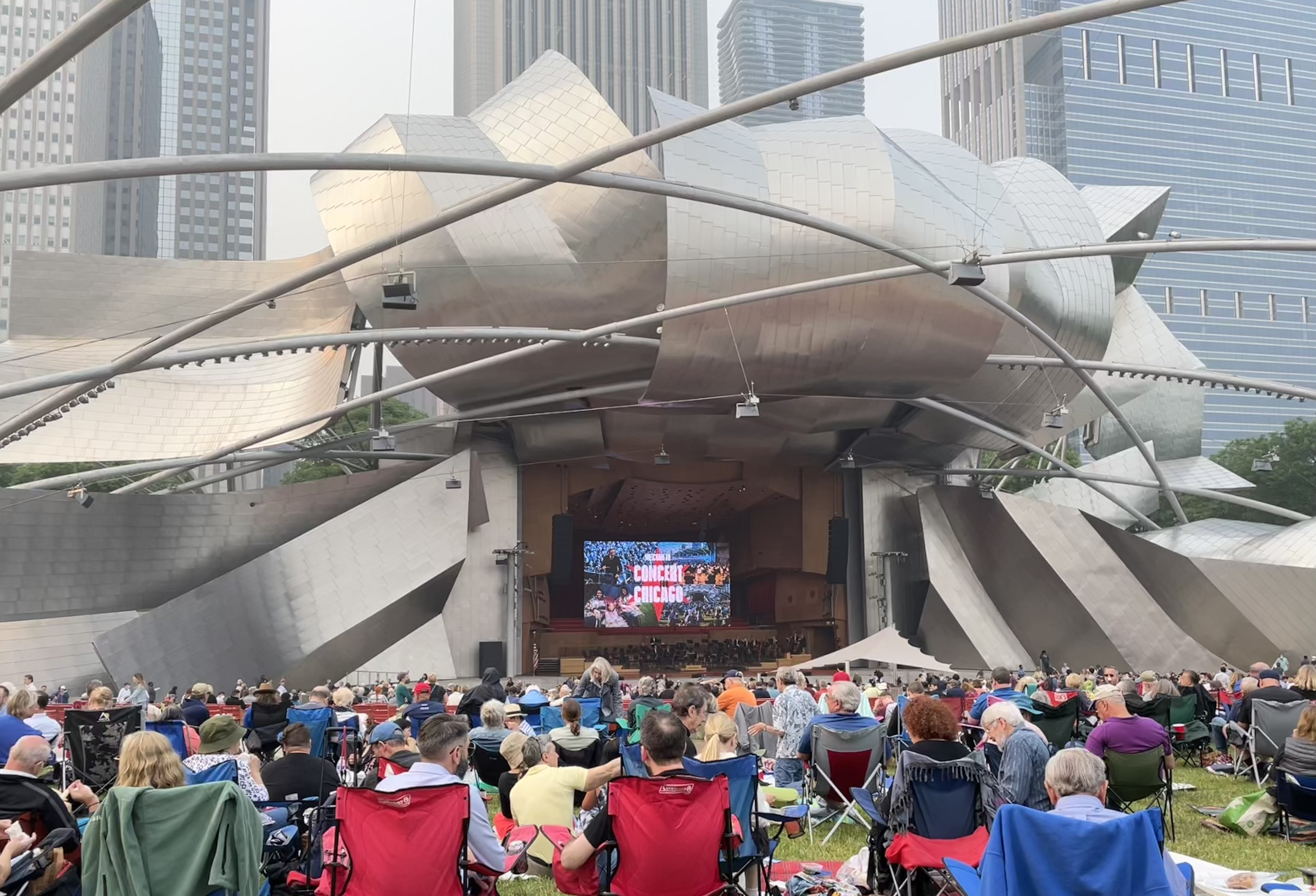
Jay Pritzker Pavilion - Chicago (2004)

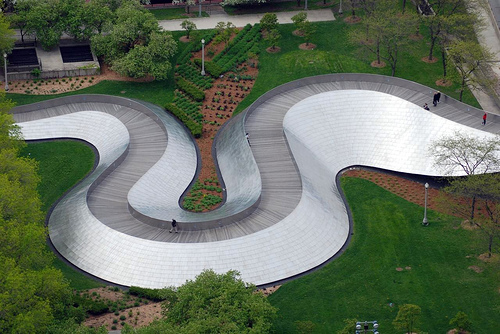
BP Pedestrian Bridge – Chicago (2004)

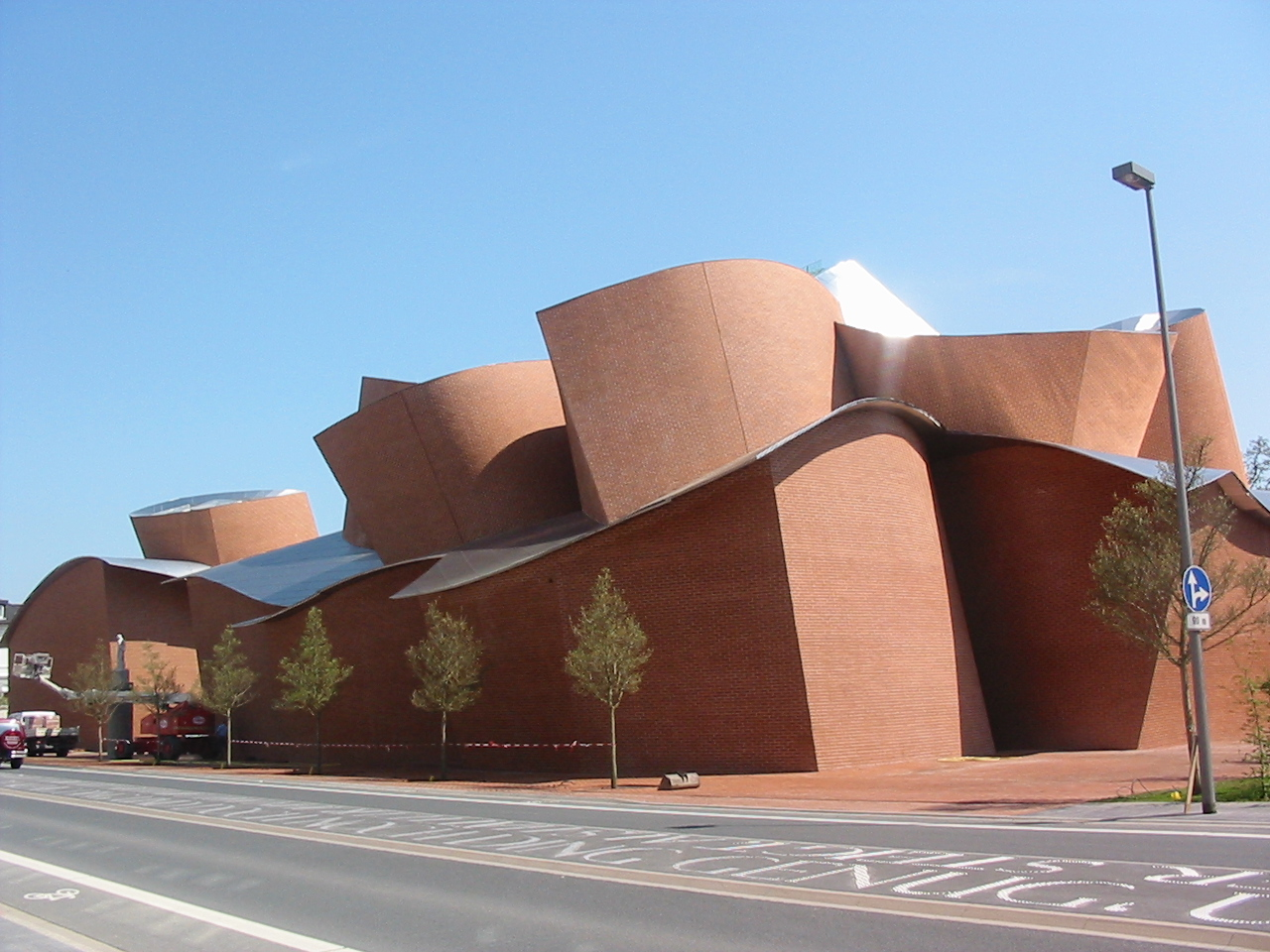
MARTa Herford (2005)

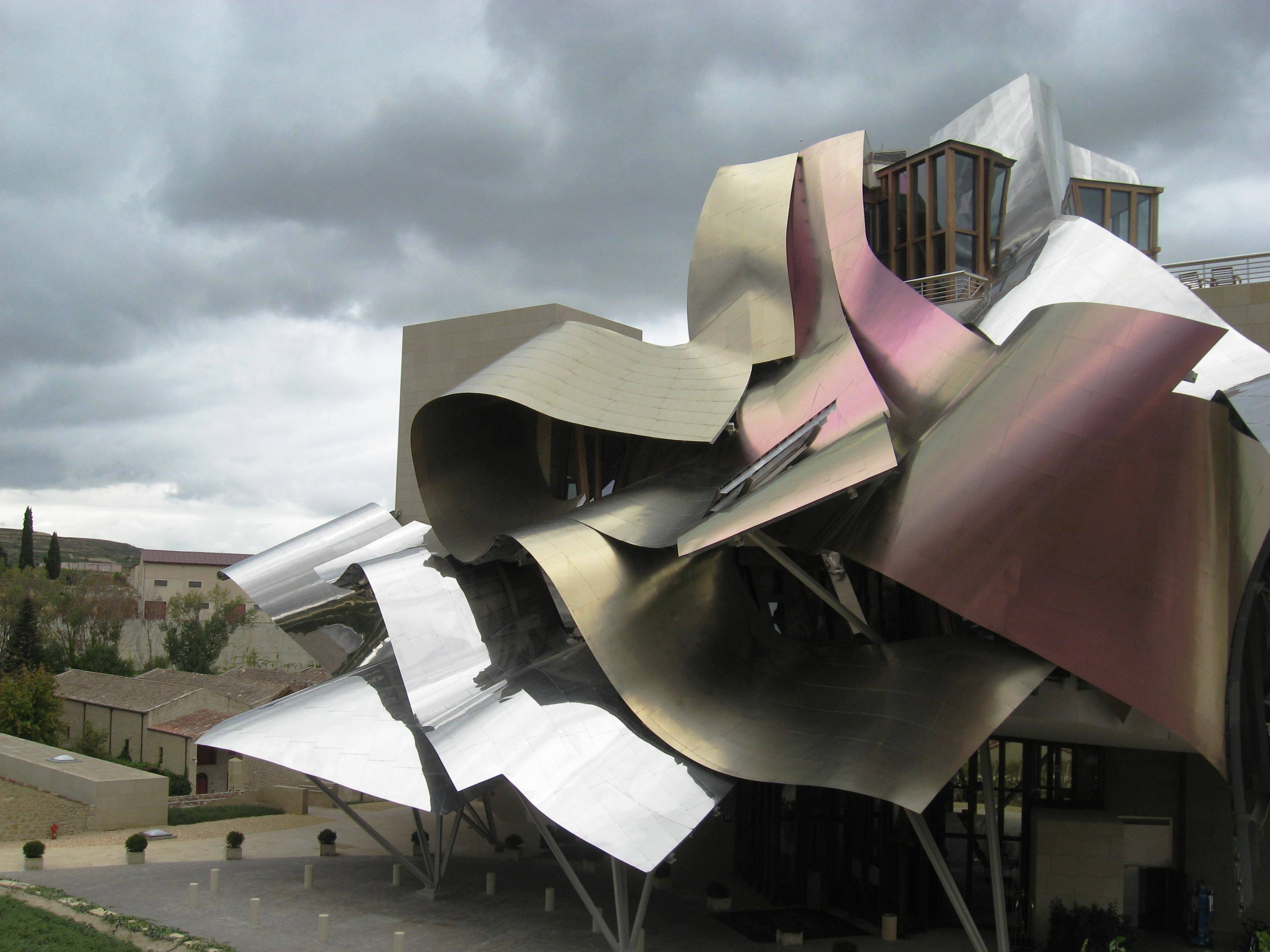
Marqués de Riscal Hotel – Elciego (2006)

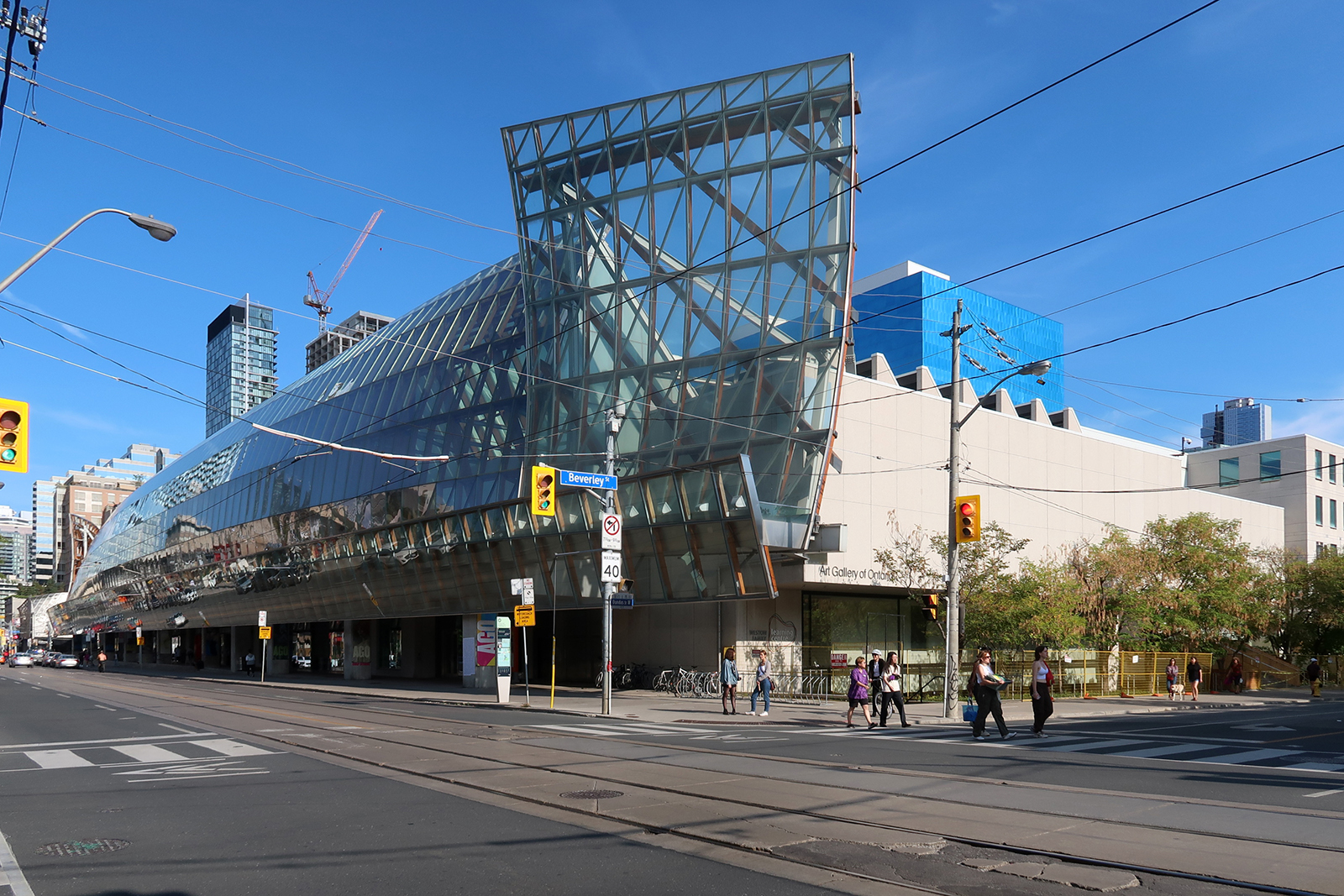
Art Gallery of Ontario – Toronto (2008)

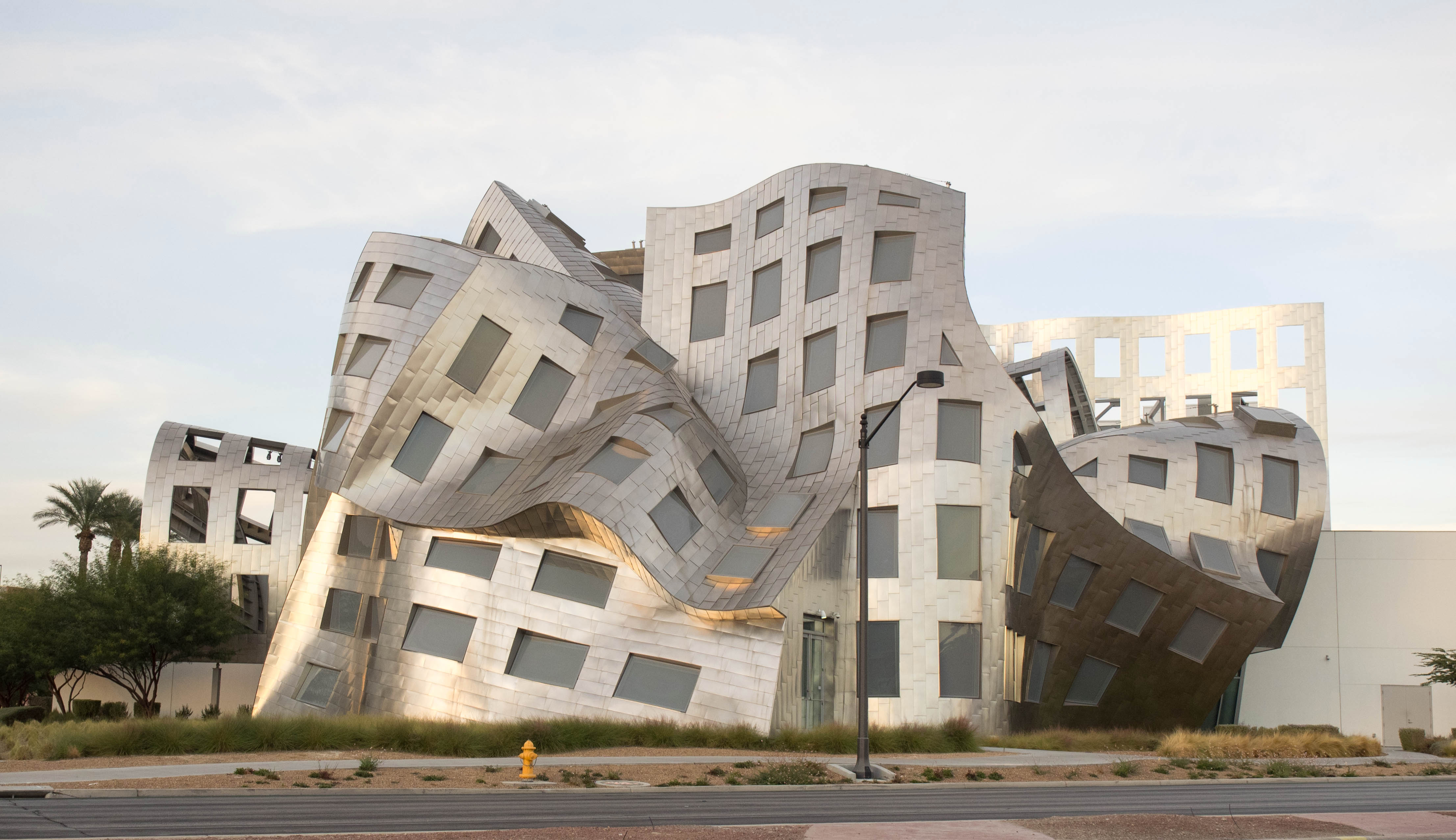
Lou Ruvo Center – Las Vegas (2010)

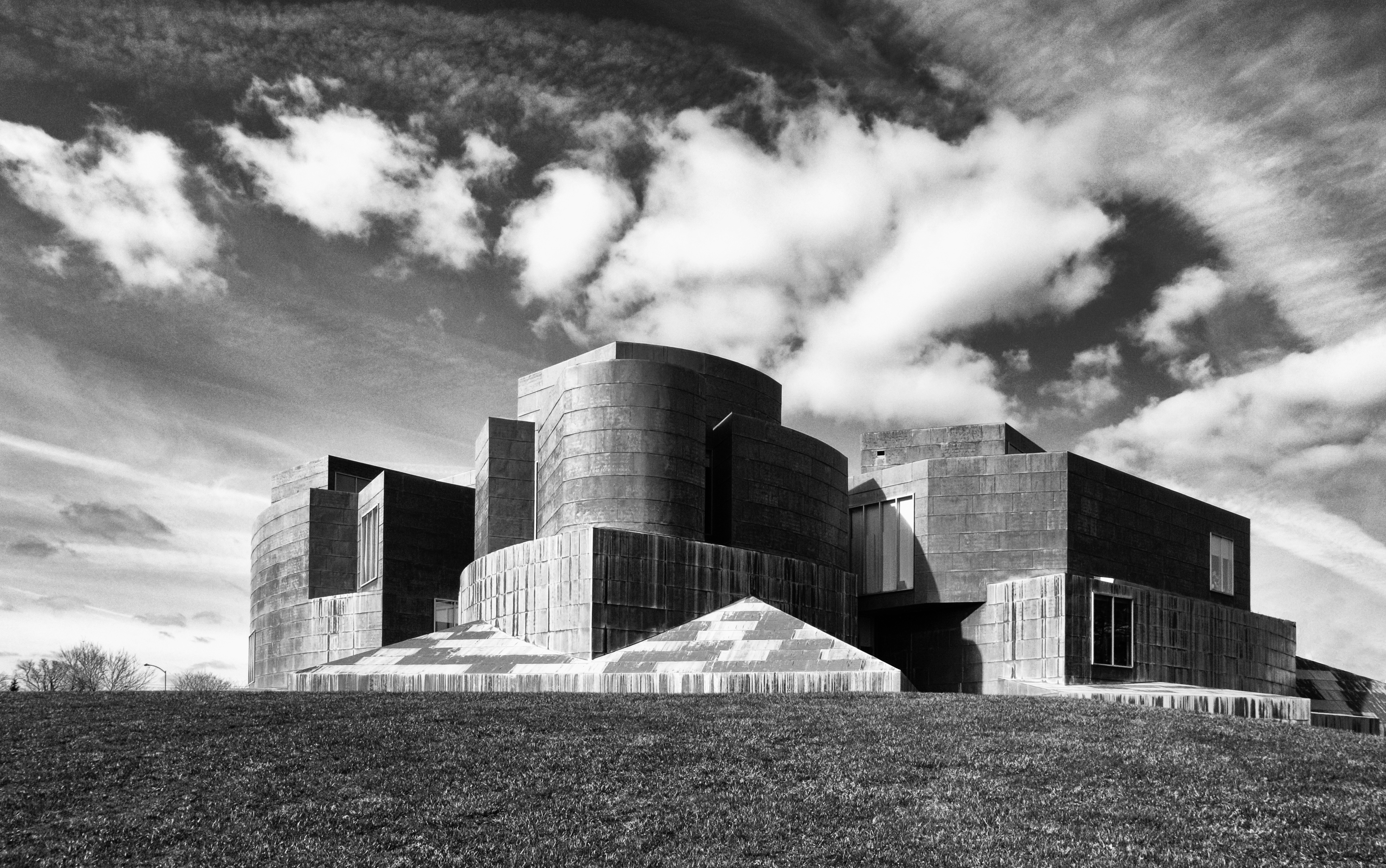
Toledo Museum of Art's Center for the Visual Arts – Toledo, Ohio (2013)

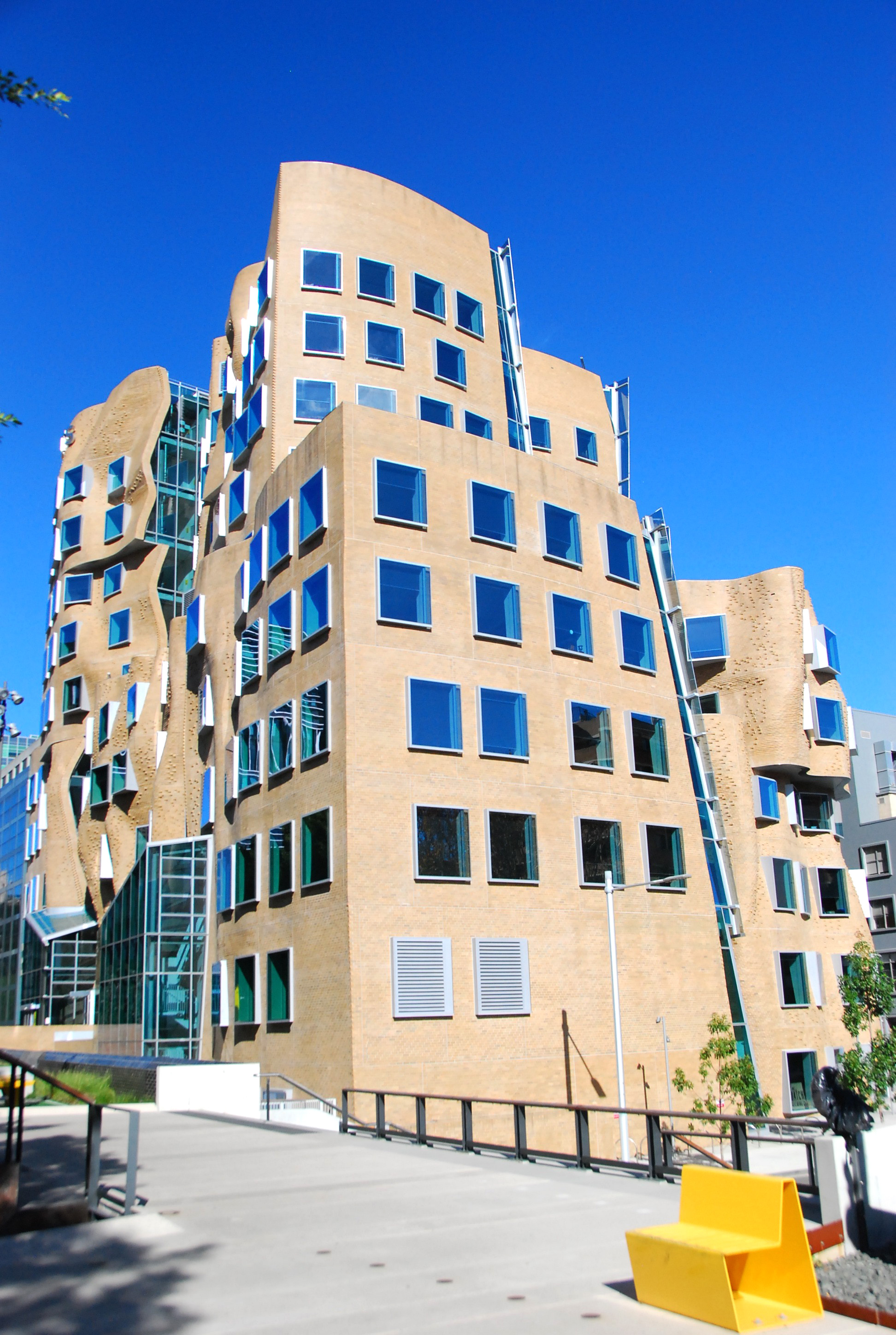
Dr Chau Chak Wing Building – Sydney (2014)

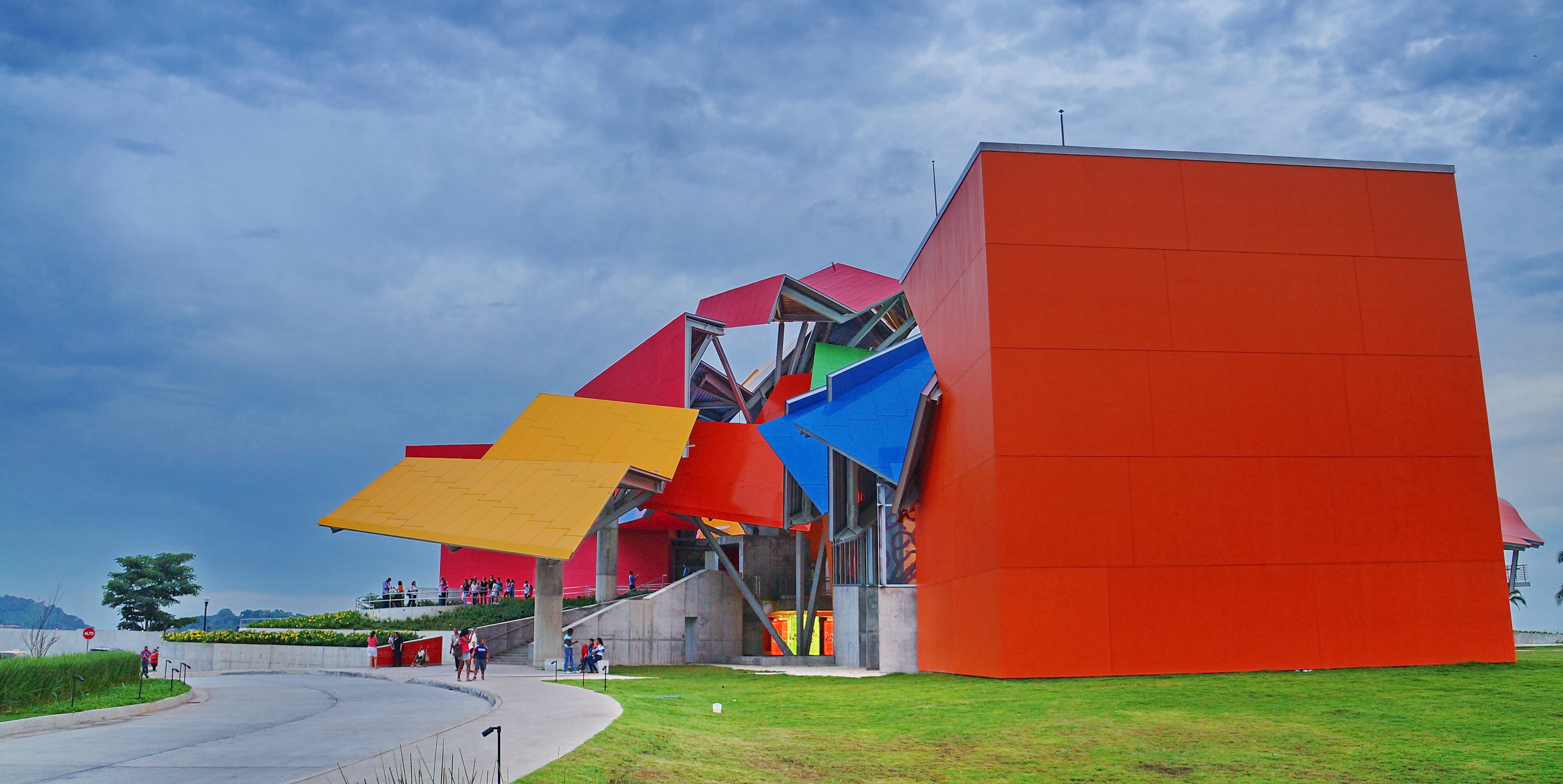
Biomuseo – Panama City (2014)

== Academia and design career ==
=== Academia ===
In January 2011, Gehry joined the University of Southern California (USC) faculty, as the Judge Widney Professor of Architecture. He continued in this role at his alma mater. He also held teaching positions at Harvard University, the University of California at Los Angeles, the University of Toronto, Columbia University, the Federal Institute of Technology in Zürich, and at Yale University.

Though he was often referred to as a "starchitect", he repeatedly expressed his disdain for the term, insisting he was only an architect.

In February 2017, MasterClass announced an online architecture course taught by Gehry that was released July of that year.

=== Exhibition design ===
Gehry was involved in exhibition designs at the Los Angeles County Museum of Art dating back to the 1960s. In 1965, Gehry designed the exhibition display for the "Art Treasures of Japan" exhibition at the LACMA. This was followed soon after by the exhibition design for the "Assyrian Reliefs" show in 1966 and the "Billy Al Bengston Retrospective" in 1968. The LACMA then had Gehry design the installation for the "Treasures of Tutankhamen" exhibition in 1978 followed by the "Avant-Garde in Russia 1910–1930" exhibition in 1980. The subsequent year, Gehry designed the exhibition for "Seventeen Artists in the '60s" at the LACMA, followed soon after by the "German Expressionist Sculpture Exhibition" in 1983. In 1991–92, Gehry designed the installation of the landmark exhibition "Degenerate Art: The Fate of the Avant-Garde in Nazi Germany", which opened at the Los Angeles County Museum of Art and traveled to the Art Institute of Chicago, the Smithsonian Institution in Washington, and the Altes Museum in Berlin. Gehry was asked to design an exhibition on the work of Alexander Calder at the Los Angeles County Museum of Art's Resnick Pavilion, again invited by the museum's curator Stephanie Barron.

In addition to his long-standing involvement with exhibition design at the LACMA, Gehry also designed numerous exhibition installations with other institutions. In 1998, "The Art of the Motorcycle" exhibition opened at the Solomon R. Guggenheim Museum with its installation designed by Gehry.

In 2014, he curated an exhibition of photography by his close friend and businessman Peter Arnell that ran from March 5 through April 1 at Milk Studios Gallery in Los Angeles.

=== Stage design ===
In 1983, Gehry created the stage design for Lucinda Childs' dance Available Light, set to music by John Adams. It premiered at the Museum of Contemporary Art, Los Angeles, at the Temporary Contemporary, and was subsequently seen at the Brooklyn Academy of Music opera house in New York City and the Theatre de la Ville in Paris. The set consisted of two levels angled in relation to each other, with a chain-link backdrop. The piece was revived in 2015, and was performed, among other places, in Los Angeles and Philadelphia, where it was presented by FringeArts, which commissioned the revival.

In 2003, Gehry designed the scene for the American premiere of Janáček's Osud at the Gehry-designed Fisher Center at Bard College. In 2012, Gehry designed the set for the Los Angeles Philharmonic's opera production of Mozart's Don Giovanni, performed at the Walt Disney Concert Hall. In April 2014, Gehry designed a set for an "exploration of the life and career of Pierre Boulez" by the Chicago Symphony Orchestra, which was performed in November of that year.

=== Other designs ===
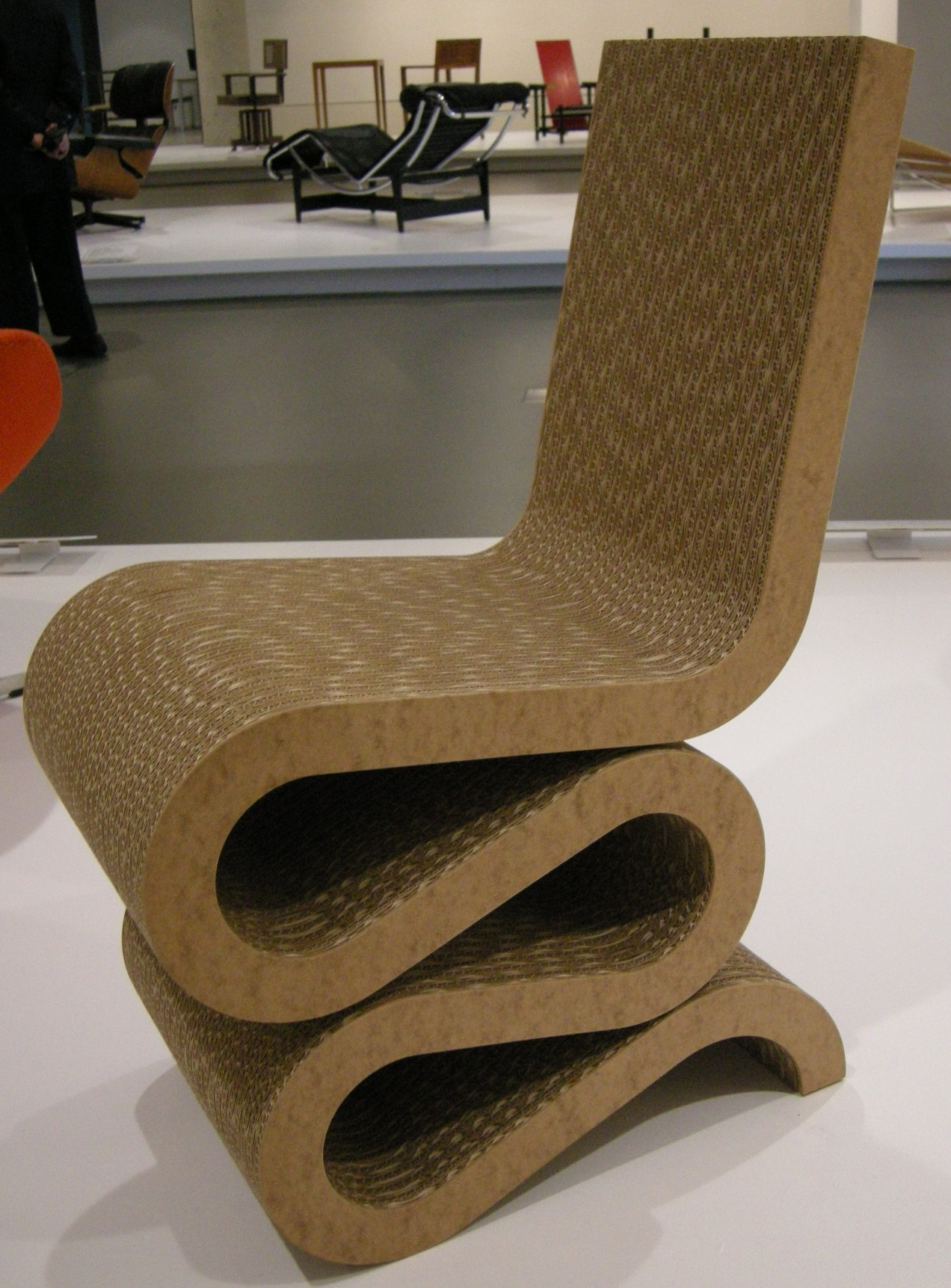
Wiggle side chair

In addition to architecture, Gehry made a line of furniture for Knoll and for Heller Furniture, jewelry for Tiffany & Co., various household items, sculptures, and even a glass bottle for Wyborowa Vodka. His first line of furniture, produced from 1969 to 1973, was called "Easy Edges", constructed out of cardboard. Another line of furniture released in the spring of 1992 is "Bentwood Furniture". Each piece is named after a different ice hockey term. He was first introduced to making furniture in 1954 while serving in the U.S. Army, where he designed furniture for enlisted soldiers.

In many of his designs, Gehry was inspired by fish. "It was by accident I got into the fish image", claimed Gehry. One thing that sparked his interest in fish was the fact that his colleagues were recreating Greek temples. He said, "Three hundred million years before man was fish....if you gotta go back, and you're insecure about going forward...go back three hundred million years ago. Why are you stopping at the Greeks? So, I started drawing fish in my sketchbook, and then I started to realize that there was something in it."

As a result of his fascination, the first Fish Lamps were fabricated between 1984 and 1986. They employed wire armatures molded into fish shapes, onto which shards of plastic laminate ColorCore are individually glued. Since the creation of the first lamp in 1984, the fish has become a recurrent motif in Gehry's work, most notably in the Fish Sculpture at La Vila Olímpica del Poblenou in Barcelona (1989–92) and Standing Glass Fish for the Minneapolis Sculpture Garden (1986).

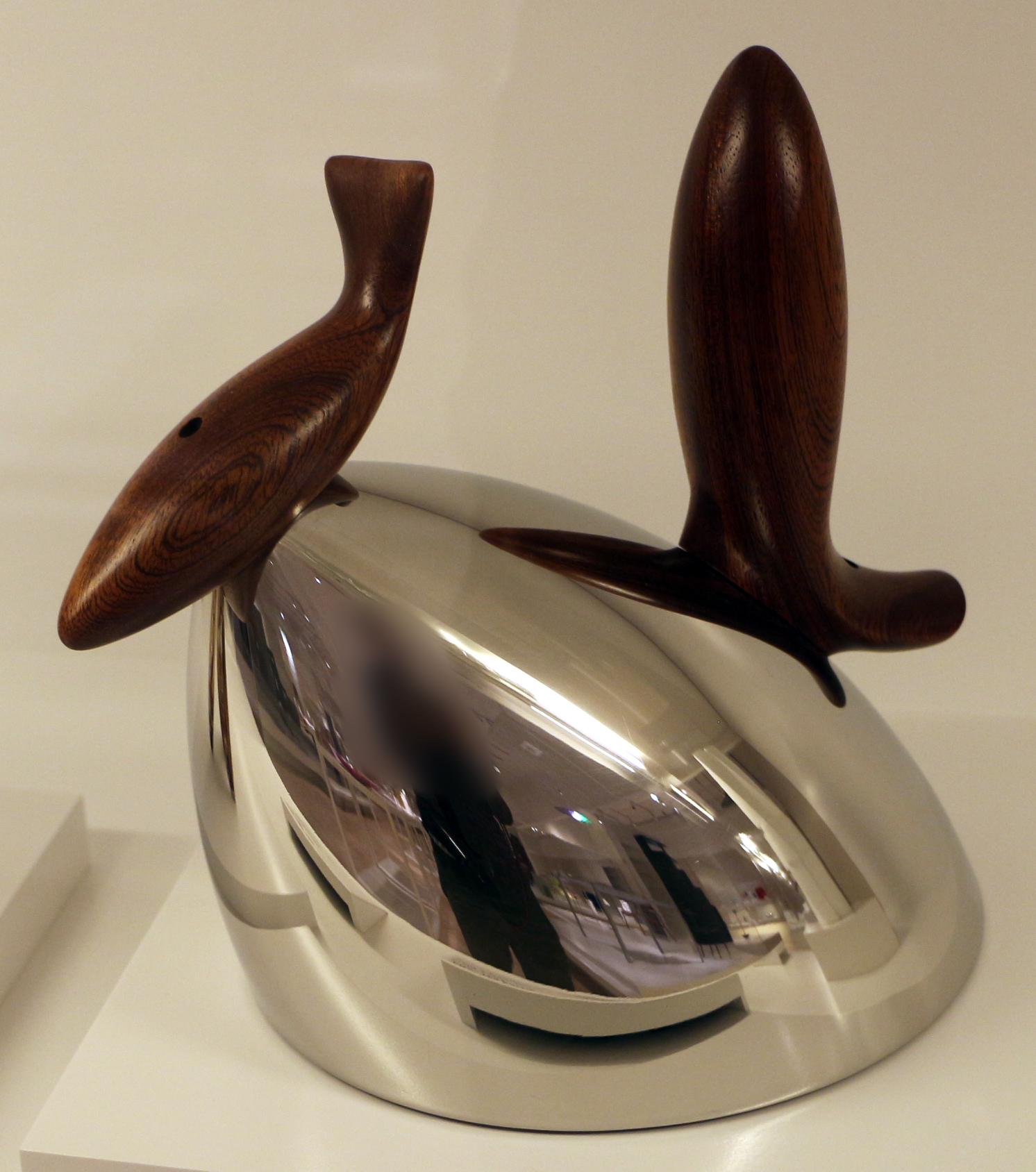
Gehry-designed kettle, presented in the Indianapolis Museum of Art

Gehry collaborated with luxury jewelry company Tiffany & Co., creating six distinct jewelry collections: the Orchid, Fish, Torque, Equus, Axis, and Fold collections. In addition to jewelry, Gehry designed other items, including a distinctive collector's chess set and a series of tableware items, including vases, cups, and bowls for the company.

In 2004, Gehry designed the official trophy for the World Cup of Hockey. He redesigned the trophy for the next tournament in 2016.

He collaborated with American furniture manufacturer Emeco on designs such as the 2004 "Superlight" chair.

In 2014, Gehry was one of the six "iconoclasts" selected by French fashion house Louis Vuitton to design a piece using their iconic monogram pattern as part of their "Celebrating Monogram" campaign.

In 2015, Gehry designed his first yacht.

In 2020, Gehry designed a limited edition bottle of Hennessy cognac.

=== Software development ===
Gehry's firm was responsible for innovation in architectural software. His firm spun off another firm called Gehry Technologies that was established in 2002. In 2005, Gehry Technologies began a partnership with Dassault Systèmes to bring innovations from the aerospace and manufacturing world to AEC and developed Digital Project software, as well as GTeam software. The 3D modelling and project management features of this software were effective in implementing Gehry's novel and complex designs under budget. For example, the Guggenheim Museum Bilbao was completed for $3M less than its budget of $100M. In 2014, Gehry Technologies was acquired by software company Trimble Navigation.

== Personal life and death ==
Gehry became a naturalized U.S. citizen in 1951, several years after he and his family moved to Los Angeles. He lost his Canadian citizenship as dual citizenship was not an option at the time. Prime Minister Jean Chrétien restored Gehry's Canadian citizenship in 2002. He lived in Santa Monica, California, and practiced out of Los Angeles. Having grown up in Canada, he was an avid fan of ice hockey. He began a hockey league, FOG (for Frank Owen Gehry), in his office, and continued to play the game until around the age of 80. In 2004, he designed the trophy for the World Cup of Hockey.

In 1952, Gehry married Anita Snyder; in 1966, they were divorced. In 1975, he married Berta Aguilera.

Gehry was known for his occasional bad temper. During a trip to Oviedo to accept the Prince of Asturias Award in October 2014, he received a significant amount of attention, both positive and negative, for publicly flipping off a reporter at a press conference who accused him of being a "showy" architect.

He was a member of the California Yacht Club in Marina Del Rey, and enjoyed sailing with his fiberglass-hulled yacht, Foggy.

On December 5, 2025, Gehry died at the age of 96 from a respiratory condition at his home in Santa Monica.

== Philanthropy ==
In 2014, Gehry co-founded Turnaround Arts: California, a 501(c)(3) nonprofit that expands access to the arts in under-resourced public elementary and middle schools across California. In addition to serving as a board member for the organization, Gehry served as a visiting artist with students. He also served on the leadership council of the New York Stem Cell Foundation.

Gehry also donated his time to design projects pro bono. In 2014, he began pro bono work with the L.A. River Revitalization Corp., a nonprofit group founded by the city, to develop the LA River Master Plan. In 2015, he unveiled his design, for which he waived his design fee, for the Children's Institute in Watts, an LA-based social services organization that provides services to families who have experienced violence and poverty. The Youth Orchestra Los Angeles (YOLA), which is an educational center and performance space that provides free instruments, music training, and academic support to students from disadvantaged neighborhoods, was also designed pro bono by Gehry and was completed in 2021.

== Legacy ==
Gehry is considered one of the most influential figures in American architecture, and one of the most influential architects in the 20th century. The Guardian, in their obituary, called Gehry "the most recognizable American architect since Frank Lloyd Wright", and stated that he "influenced the course of world architecture at least twice" with "his informal ad hoc aesthetic" in the 1970s and his use of computers in the 1990s. He was called a "Titan of Architecture" by The New York Times in their obituary of him and was credited for designing some of the world's most recognizable buildings. The Los Angeles Times described Gehry as an architect who "transformed Los Angeles' urban landscape". After his death, Mark Carney, the Prime Minister of Canada, said that "his unmistakable vision lives on in iconic buildings around the world."

Gehry was said to have been one of the first architects to "grasp the liberating potential of computer design". He was also the progenitor of the "Bilbao effect", referring to a museum that he built which revitalized the economy of the city of Bilbao. The BBC noted that Gehry's redesign of his own Santa Monica home using chain-link fencing, plywood and corrugated steel materials is what "built his daring reputation".

=== Bilbao effect ===
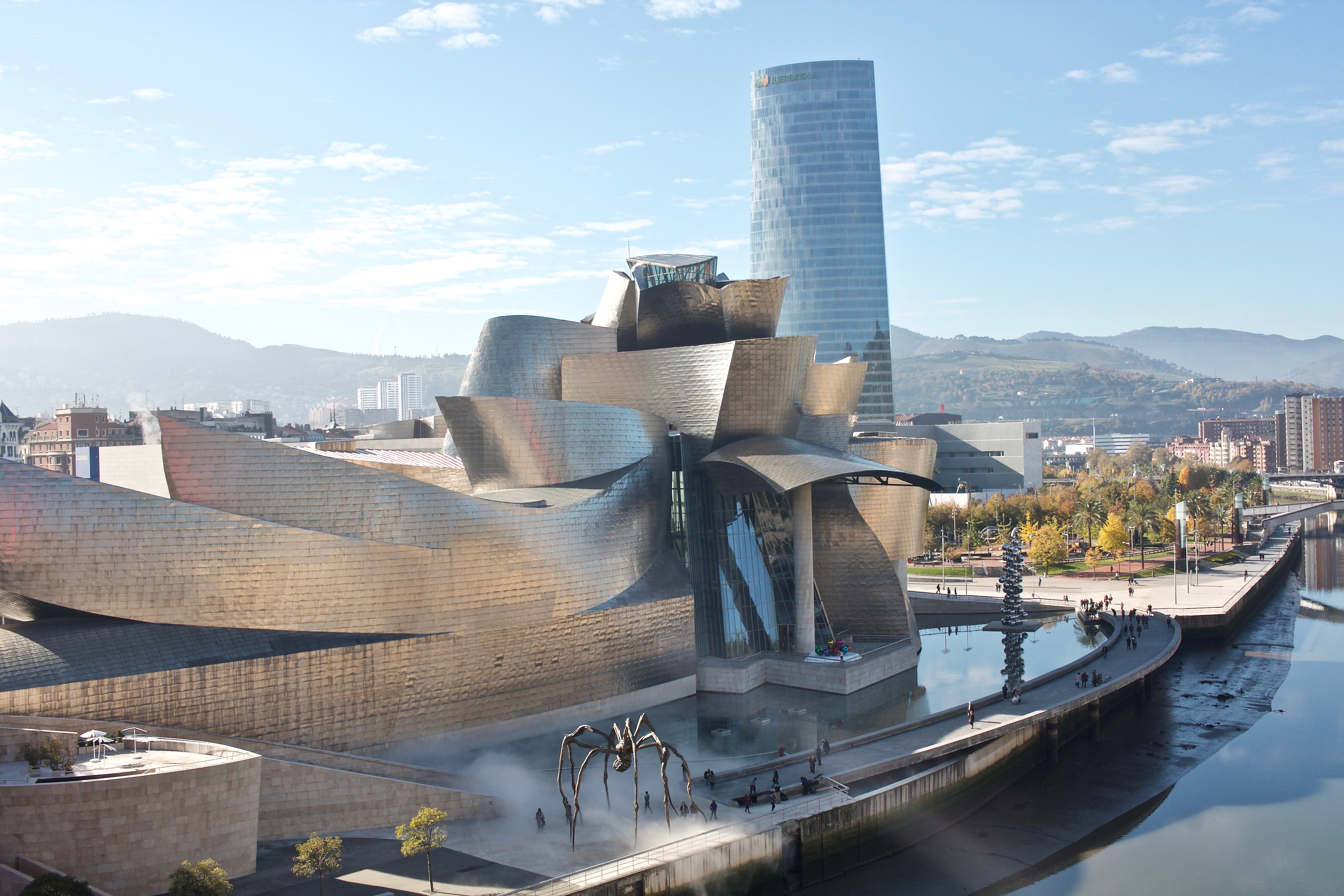
Guggenheim Museum Bilbao

The term "Bilbao effect" emerged in urban planning to describe the transformative impact of Gehry's architecture. His design for the Guggenheim Museum in Bilbao revitalized the city, serving as a prime example of how architecture can drive economic and cultural renewal. The museum's dramatic curves and shimmering titanium panels are defining features of Gehry's style, emphasizing movement and fluidity.

After the phenomenal success of Gehry's design for the Guggenheim Museum in Bilbao, critics began referring to the economic and cultural revitalization of cities through iconic, innovative architecture as the "Bilbao effect". In the first 12 months after the museum was opened, an estimated US$160 million was added to the Basque economy. As of 2014, over $3.5 billion was added to the Basque economy since the building opened. In subsequent years there have been many attempts to replicate this effect through large-scale eye-catching architectural commissions that have been both successful and unsuccessful, such as Daniel Libeskind's expansion of the Denver Art Museum and buildings by Gehry himself, the almost universally well-received Walt Disney Concert Hall in Los Angeles, and the more controversial Museum of Pop Culture in Seattle. Though some link the concept of the Bilbao effect to the notion of starchitecture, Gehry consistently rejected the label of a starchitect.

=== In popular culture ===
In 2004, Gehry voiced himself in an episode of the children's TV show Arthur called "Castles in the Sky", where he helped Arthur and his friends design a new treehouse. He also voiced himself in a 2005 episode of The Simpsons, "The Seven-Beer Snitch", where he designs a concert hall for the fictional city of Springfield. He later said he regretted the appearance, as it included a joke about his design technique that has led people to misunderstand his architectural process.

In 2006, filmmaker Sydney Pollack made a documentary about Gehry's work, Sketches of Frank Gehry, which followed Gehry over five years and painted a positive portrait of his character; it was well-received critically.

In 2009, architecture-inspired ice cream sandwich company Coolhaus named a cookie and ice cream combination after Gehry. Dubbed the "Frank Behry", it features Strawberries & Cream gelato and snickerdoodle cookies.

== Exhibitions ==
In October 2014, the first major European exhibition of Gehry's work debuted at the Centre Pompidou in Paris. Other museums and major galleries that have held exhibitions on Gehry's architecture and design include the Leo Castelli Gallery in 1983; and the Walker Art Center in 1986, whose exhibition then traveled to the Toronto Harbourfront Museum, the Contemporary Arts Museum Houston, the High Museum of Art in Atlanta, the LACMA and the Whitney Museum. Museums and art ecvets who have mounted exhibitions on Gehry's work include the Philadelphia Museum of Art, the Museum of Modern Art (1992), the Gagosian Gallery (1984, 1992 and 1993), the Solomon R. Guggenheim Museum (2001), the Guggenheim Museum Bilbao (2002), the Jewish Museum in Manhattan (2010), and the Milan Triennale (first in 1988, then in 2010 with an exhibition entitled "Frank Gehry from 1997"), and LACMA (2015).

Gehry participated in the 1980 Venice Biennale's The Presence of the Past exhibition, designing an architectural facade for the Strada Novissima installation. He also contributed to the 1985 Venice Biennale with an installation and performance named Il Corso del Coltello, in collaboration with Claes Oldenburg. His projects were featured in the 1996 event, and he contributed to the 2008 event with the installation Ungapatchket.

In October 2015, 21 21 Design Sight in Tokyo held the exhibition Frank Gehry. I Have An Idea, curated by Japanese architect Tsuyoshi Tane.

In 2021, the Gagosian Gallery in Beverly Hills held Spinning Tales, an exhibition of new fish sculptures by Gehry. From May 14–June 27, 2026, the same gallery will exhibit Frank Gehry, organized in collaboration with Gehry's family, of his animal-themed works.

== Awards and honors ==
External videos
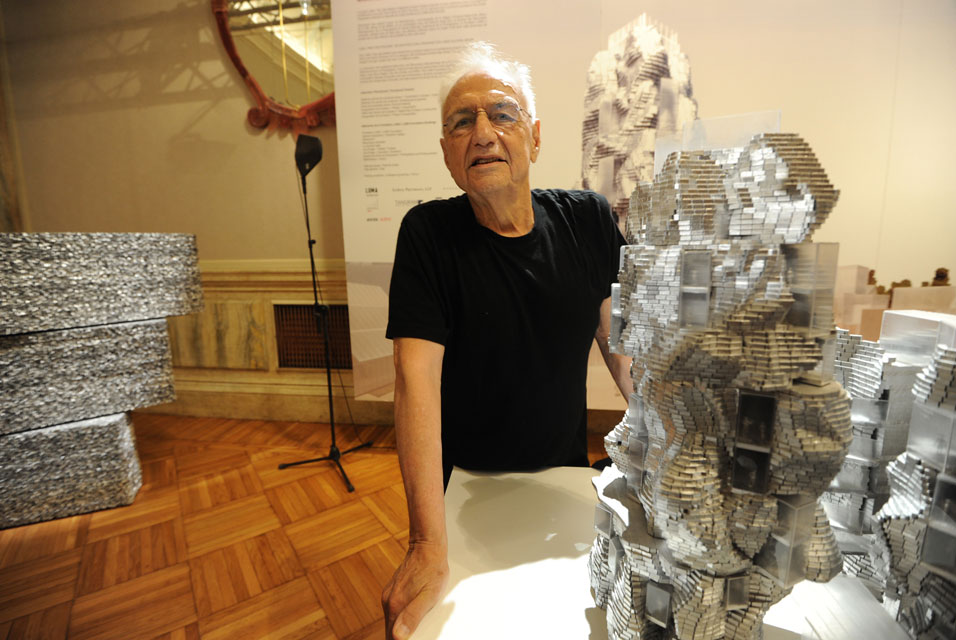
- Frank Gehry: My days as a young rebel, 44:28, TED Talks
- Frank Gehry: A master architect asks, Now what?, 21:56, TED Talks

- 1974: Fellow of the American Institute of Architects
- 1977: Arnold W. Brunner Prize in Architecture
- 1986: Distinguished Architect Award from the American Institute of Architects (Los Angeles Chapter)
- 1987: Fellow of American Academy of Arts and Letters
- 1988: Elected into the National Academy of Design
- 1989: Pritzker Architecture Prize
- 1992: Praemium Imperiale
- 1994: The Dorothy and Lillian Gish Prize
- 1994: Thomas Jefferson Medal in Architecture
- 1995: American Academy of Achievement's Golden Plate Award
- 1995: Chrysler Award of Innovation in Design
- 1998: National Medal of Arts
- 1998: Inaugural Austrian Frederick Kiesler Prize for Architecture and the Arts
- 1998: Gold Medal Award, Royal Architectural Institute of Canada
- 1999: AIA Gold Medal, American Institute of Architects
- 2000: Cooper–Hewitt National Design Award Lifetime Achievement
- 2002: Companion of the Order of Canada (CC)
- 2004: Woodrow Wilson Award for Public Service
- 2006: Inductee, California Hall of Fame
- 2007: Henry C. Turner Prize for Innovation in Construction Technology from the National Building Museum (on behalf of Gehry Partners and Gehry Technologies)
- 2008: Order of Charlemagne (Grand Cross, later returned), Andorra
- 2012: Twenty-five Year Award, American Institute of Architects
- 2014: Prince of Asturias Award
- 2014: Commandeur of the Ordre National de la Légion d'honneur, France
- 2015: J. Paul Getty Medal
- 2016: Harvard Arts Medal
- 2016: Leonore and Walter Annenberg Award for Diplomacy through the Arts, Foundation for Arts and Preservation in Embassies
- 2016: Presidential Medal of Freedom
- 2018: Neutra Medal
- 2019: Inductee, Canada's Walk of Fame
- 2020: Paez Medal of Art, New York City (VAEA)

Gehry was elected to the College of Fellows of the American Institute of Architects (AIA) in 1974, and he received many national, regional, and local AIA awards. He was a senior fellow of the Design Futures Council and served on the steering committee of the Aga Khan Award for Architecture.

Though born in Canada, Gehry lost his Canadian citizenship in 1951 when he became a naturalized American citizen, as dual citizenship was not an option for either country at the time. He regained his Canadian citizenship in 2002 and took his citizenship oath in Prime Minister Jean Chrétien's office. According to Chrétien, Gehry considered moving back to Canada due to Donald Trump being elected.

=== Honorary degrees ===
- 1987: California Institute of the Arts
- 1987: Rhode Island School of Design
- 1989: Otis College of Art and Design
- 1989: Technical University of Nova Scotia
- 1993: Occidental College
- 1995: Whittier College
- 1996: Southern California Institute of Architecture
- 1998: University of Toronto
- 2000: Harvard University
- 2000: University of Edinburgh
- 2000: University of Southern California
- 2000: Yale University
- 2002: City College of New York
- 2004: School of the Art Institute of Chicago
- 2013: Case Western Reserve University
- 2013: Princeton University
- 2014: Juilliard School
- 2015: University of Technology Sydney
- 2017: University of Oxford
- 2019: Southern California Institute of Architecture

== See also ==
- Contemporary architecture
- Organization of the artist
- Thin-shell structure

== Bibliography ==
- Dal Co, Francesco; Forster, Kurt W.; Arnold, Hadley (1998). Frank O. Gehry: The Complete Works. New York: The Monacelli Press. ISBN 978-1-885254-63-4.
- Gehry, Frank O.; Colomina, Beatriz; Friedman, Mildred; Mitchell, William J.; Ragheb, J. Fiona; Cohen, Jean-Louis; Solomon R. Guggenheim Museum; Museo Guggenheim Bilbao (May 2001). Frank Gehry Architect (Hardcover). Guggenheim Publications. p. 390. ISBN 978-0-8109-6929-2.
- Goldberger, Paul (2015). Building Art: The Life and Work of Frank Gehry. New York: Alfred A. Knopf. ISBN 978-0-307-70153-4. OCLC 913514521 – via Google Books.
- Rattenbury, Kester (2006). Architects Today. Laurence King Publishers. ISBN 978-1-85669-492-6.
- Staff (1995). "Frank Gehry 1991-1995". El Croquis.
