= Gehry Residence =

Architect Frank Gehry's personal home

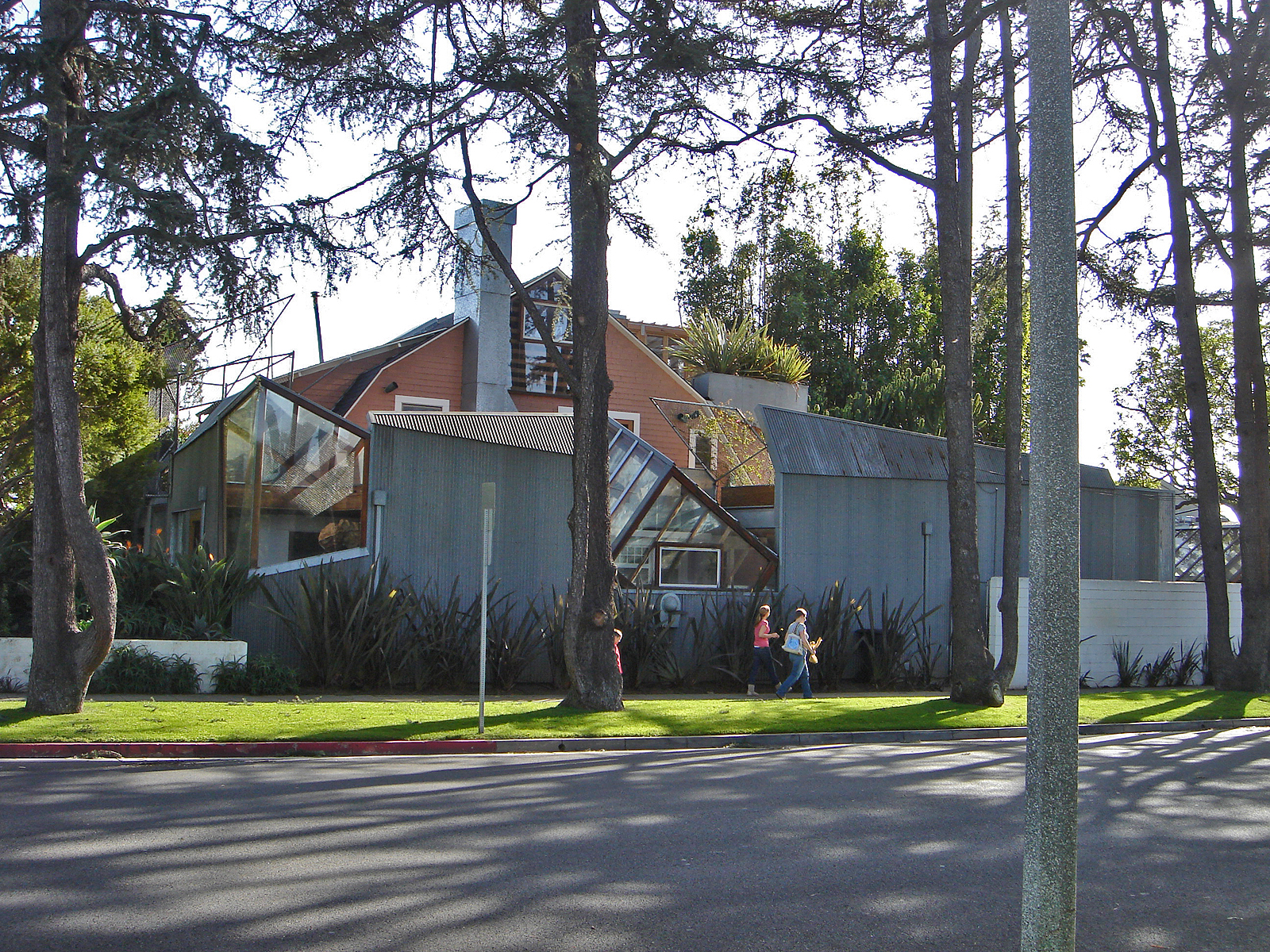
- Interactive map of Gehry Residence

General information
- Type: House
- Architectural style: Deconstructivist
- Location: 1002 22nd Street; Santa Monica, California 90403
- Coordinates: 34°2′6.62″N 118°29′5.13″W

Design and construction
- Architect: Frank Gehry

The Gehry Residence is the former home of architect Frank Gehry. It was originally an extension, designed by Gehry and built around an existing Dutch colonial style house. It makes use of unconventional materials, such as chain-link fences and corrugated steel. It is sometimes considered one of the earliest deconstructivist buildings, although Gehry denied this.

The residence is in Santa Monica, California. In 1977, Frank and Berta Gehry bought a pink bungalow originally built in 1920. Gehry wanted to experiment with the materials he was already using: metal, plywood, chain link fencing, and wood framing. In 1978, he chose to wrap the house with a new exterior while leaving the old exterior visible. He hardly touched the rear and south facades, and to the other sides of the house he added tilted glass cubes. Many of Gehry's neighbors were unhappy with the unusual architecture appearing in their neighborhood.

Gehry owned the house until his death in 2025; though he built another residence overlooking Rustic Canyon, he planned to keep the Santa Monica house in the family.

== See also ==
- List of works by Frank Gehry
