= Triennial 2016 =

Overview
- BIE-class: Triennial exposition
- Name: Triennial 2016
- Motto: 21st century. Design after Design.

Location
- Country: Italy
- City: Milan
- Coordinates: 45°28′19.92″N 9°10′24.78″E

Timeline
- Opening: 2 April 2016
- Closure: 12 September 2016

Triennial expositions
- Previous: Milan Triennial XIX in Milan
- Next: Triennial 2019 in Milan

Specialized expositions
- Previous: Expo 2012 in Yeosu
- Next: Expo 2017 in Astana

Simultaneous
- Horticultural (AIPH): Expo 2016

The Triennial 2016 was the Triennial sanctioned by the Bureau of International Expositions (BIE) in the Italian city of Milan. Its theme was 21st century. Design after Design.

It was the first Triennial governed by the current BIE treaty. Thus picking up a tradition, by the BIE and Milan, of architecture and design expositions held since 1923 in Northern Italy after a break of twenty years.
