= Milan Triennial XVIII =

Overview
- BIE-class: Triennial exposition
- Name: Milan Triennial XVIII
- Motto: Life in Things and Nature: Design and the Environmental Challenge
- Building(s): Palazzo del Arte

Location
- Country: Italy
- City: Milan
- Coordinates: 45°28′19.92″N 9°10′24.78″E

Triennial expositions
- Previous: Milan Triennial XVII in Milan
- Next: Milan Triennial XIX in Milan

The Milan Triennial XVIII was the Triennial in Milan sanctioned by the Bureau of International Expositions (BIE), held at the Palazzo dell'Arte in 1992. Its theme was Life in Things and Nature: Design and the Environmental Challenge, was designed by Aldo Rossi, and curated by Angelo Cortesi.
