= Triennial 2019 =

Overview
- BIE-class: Triennial exposition
- Name: Triennial 2019
- Building(s): Palazzo dell'Arte

Participant(s)
- Countries: 21

Location
- Country: Italy
- City: Milan
- Coordinates: 45°28′19.92″N 9°10′24.78″E

Timeline
- Awarded: 12 June 2018
- Opening: 1 March 2019
- Closure: 1 September 2019

Triennial expositions
- Previous: Triennial 2016 in Milan
- Next: XXIII Triennale di Milano

Internet
- Website: http://www.brokennature.org/

The Triennial 2019, entitled Broken Nature: Design Takes on Human Survival, was the 22nd Triennial held in Milan from 1 March 2019 to 1 September 2019 at the Palazzo dell'Arte. It was sanctioned by the Bureau of International Expositions (BIE) on 12 June 2018.

== History ==
The exhibition that gives the event its name and theme was curated by Paola Antonelli, Senior Curator of the Department of Architecture and Design and Director of Research and Development at the Museum of Modern Art (MoMA) in New York, with Ala Tannir, Laura Maeran, and Erica Petrillo. The international participations were solicited via official governmental channels.

The event featured a central thematic exhibition complemented by 21 international participations. The contributions spanned all continents, providing a heterogeneous discourse through a diverse range of themes, perspectives, and socio-cultural contexts. The exhibition sought to explore the concept of restorative design, examining the frayed bonds between humans and the natural environment and highlighting design's potential to facilitate systemic repair and long-term survival. The thematic exhibition Broken Nature consisted of three major commissions as well as numerous loans. An ambitious public program of events––with conferences, panels, workshops, screenings, and performances–– complemented the XXII Triennale.

There were 21 participating countries.
