= Milan Triennial XIX =

Overview
- BIE-class: Triennial exposition
- Name: Milan Triennial XIX
- Motto: Identities and Differences
- Building(s): Palazzo del Arte

Participant(s)
- Countries: 27

Location
- Country: Italy
- City: Milan
- Coordinates: 45°28′19.92″N 9°10′24.78″E

Timeline
- Awarded: 8 June 1994
- Opening: 22 February 1996
- Closure: 5 May 1996

Triennial expositions
- Previous: Milan Triennial XVII in Milan
- Next: Triennial 2016 in Milan

The Milan Triennial XIX was the Triennial in Milan sanctioned by the Bureau of International Expositions (BIE) on the 8 June 1994. Its theme was Identities and Differences. It was held at the Palazzo dell'Arte and ran from 22 February 1996 to 5 May 1996.
