= Milan Triennial XV =

Overview
- BIE-class: Triennial exposition
- Name: Milan Triennial XV
- Building(s): Palazzo del Arte

Location
- Country: Italy
- City: Milan
- Coordinates: 45°28′19.92″N 9°10′24.78″E

Triennial expositions
- Previous: Milan Triennial XIV in Milan
- Next: Milan Triennial XVI in Milan

The Milan Triennial XV was the Triennial in Milan sanctioned by the Bureau of International Expositions (BIE) held in 1973.

== Contributors ==
The director of the International Architecture section was Aldo Rossi with Bonicalzi, Braghieri, Franco Raggi, Massimo Scolari and Daniele Vitale.

In September Friedensreich Hundertwasser planted 15 trees in Via Manzoni apartments.

Giorgio de Chirico created the "Mysterious Baths Fountain" in Parco Sempione.

The architect Richard Meier was another contributor.
