= Milan Triennial XVI =

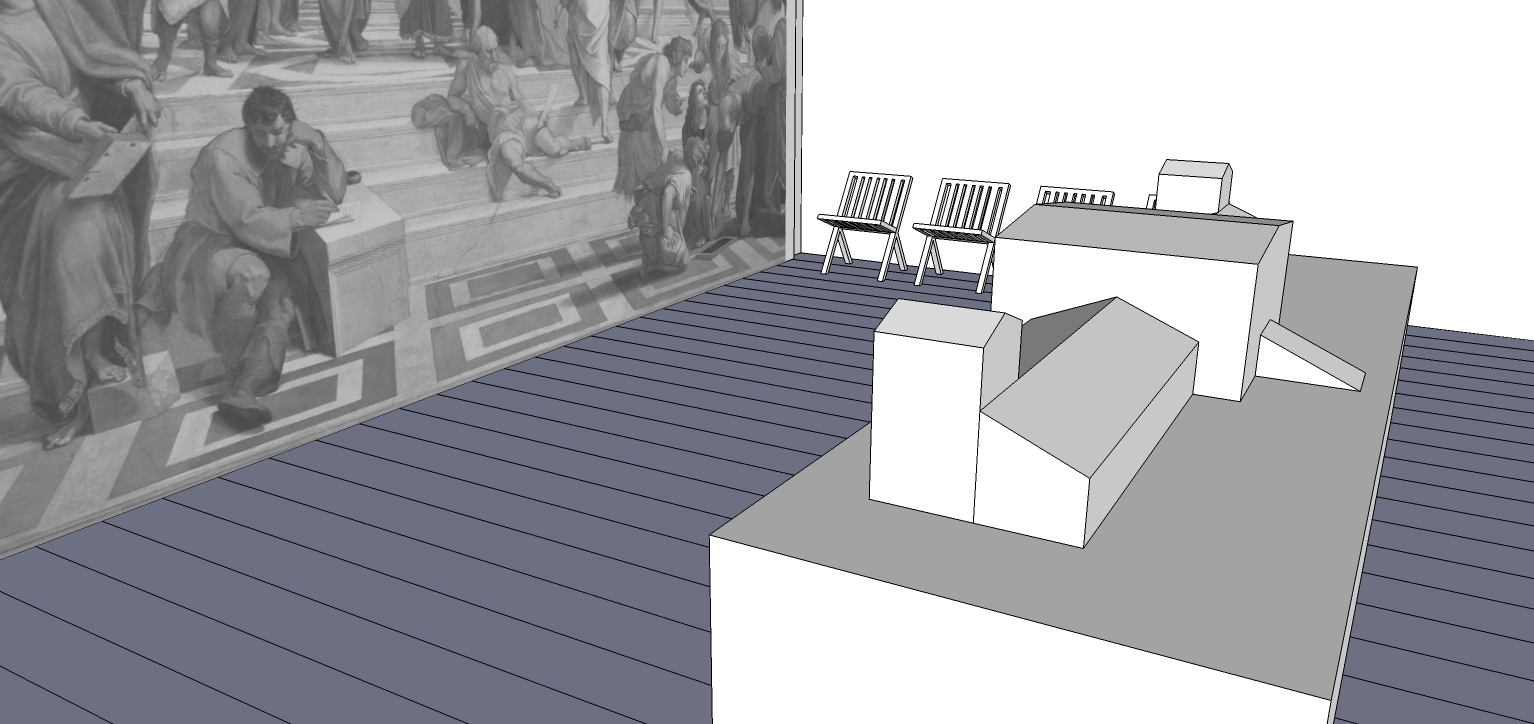
- Architecture / Idea hall with life size copy of Raphael's The School of Athens

Overview
- BIE-class: Triennial exposition
- Name: Milan Triennial XVI
- Motto: The Domestic Project
- Building(s): Palazzo del Arte

Location
- Country: Italy
- City: Milan
- Coordinates: 45°28′19.92″N 9°10′24.78″E

Triennial expositions
- Previous: Milan Triennial XV in Milan
- Next: Milan Triennial XVII in Milan

The Milan Triennial XVI was the Triennial in Milan sanctioned by the Bureau of International Expositions (BIE) and held at the Palazzo dell'Arte in 1979.

Exhibits included Ugo La Pietra's audiovisual space Real Space-Virtual-Space.
