= XXIII Triennale di Milano =

Male human name

Overview
- BIE-class: Triennial exposition
- Name: XXIII Triennale di Milano
- Motto: Unknown Unknowns. What we don’t know we don’t know
- Building(s): Palazzo dell'Arte

Location
- Country: Italy
- City: Milan
- Coordinates: 45°28′19.92″N 9°10′24.78″E

Timeline
- Opening: 20 May 2022
- Closure: 20 November 2022

Triennial expositions
- Previous: Triennial 2019 in Milan

The XXIII Triennale di Milano was, as its name suggests, the 23rd Milan Triennial, and was the 19th held in Milan itself.

== Planning ==
Three symposia were planned to define the theme and identify a curator for this triennial.

The first took place on 4 March 2020, and was streamed live to the public.

The second symposium The Earth seen from the Moon which had been scheduled for 4 June 2020 but was postponed in solidarity with Black Lives Matter and then took place in the Palazzo dell'Arte and remotely on 11 June 2020. It discussed current global challenges including the COVID-19 pandemic.

The third was scheduled for the 11 July and was to consider social justice and equal rights.

== Approval ==
The BIE have approved the fair to run from May 20 May to 20 November 2022 with a theme of Unknown Unknowns. What we don’t know we don’t know.
