= Milan Triennial XVII =

Overview
- BIE-class: Triennial exposition
- Name: Milan Triennial XVII
- Motto: The Cities of the World and the Future of the Metropolis
- Building(s): Palazzo del Arte
- Organized by: Marco Cavallotti (secretary general)

Participant(s)
- Countries: 12

Location
- Country: Italy
- City: Milan
- Coordinates: 45°28′19.92″N 9°10′24.78″E

Timeline
- Opening: 21 September 1988
- Closure: 18 December 1988

Triennial expositions
- Previous: Milan Triennial XVI in Milan
- Next: Milan Triennial XVIII in Milan

The Milan Triennial XVII was the Triennial in Milan sanctioned by the Bureau of International Expositions (BIE) on the 5 June 1986. Its theme was The Cities of the World and the Future of the Metropolis. It was held at the Palazzo dell'Arte and ran from 21 September 1988 to 18 December 1988.
