= Gabriele Mucchi =

Italian painter (1899–2002)

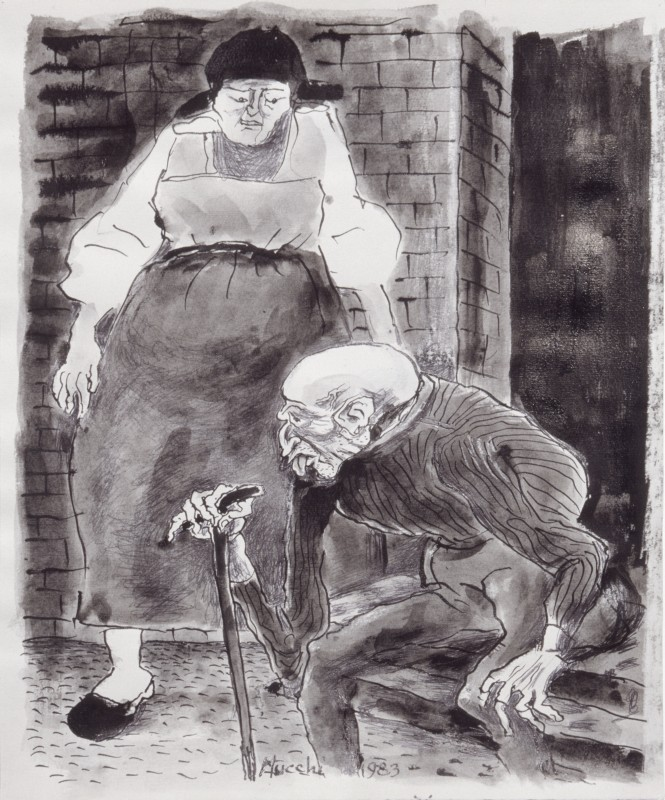
Gabriele Mucchi, Caricatura, ca. 1983. Courtesy of Fondazione Cariplo, Milan

Gabriele Mucchi (1899 – 2002) was an Italian painter.

== Biography ==
After graduating in architectural engineering at Bologna University in 1923, Gabriele Mucchi abandoned architecture to devote himself to painting, following in the footsteps of his father Antonio Maria. In 1926 he moved to Milan and the following year he exhibited with the Novecento Italiano group. He also started working as an illustrator collaborating with writers such as Achille Campanile (Ma che cos’è questo amore, 1927) and Cesare Zavattini (Parliamo tanto di me, 1931, and I poveri sono matti, 1937). He participated in the Venice Biennale in 1930 and in the 5th and 6th Milan Triennial with paintings and decorative panels in 1933 and 1936.

An intellectual with anti-Fascist ideas, Mucchi was a sympathiser of the Corrente di Vita movement. In 1943, at the outbreak of the Italian Civil War he joined the Val d'Ossola partisans by enrolling in the 186ª Brigata Garibaldi. At the end of World War II he returned to Milan and started working in a Realist style. He also continued to work in the field of architecture, which he had begun to do in the 1930s. In 1947 he participated in the housing project for the QT8 area in Milan, for which he also designed furniture. His work was exhibited in the 8th Milan Triennale that same year. In 1956 he was invited to teach painting at the Academy of Arts, Berlin, where he spent a long time during the following years. He continued to hold exhibitions both in Germany and Italy, and to pursue his career as a decorator and illustrator. In 1967 he illustrated the Italian edition of Voltaire’s Candide.

== Other projects ==
Media related to Gabriele Mucchi at Wikimedia Commons
