= Eugenio Gentili Tedeschi =

Italian architect

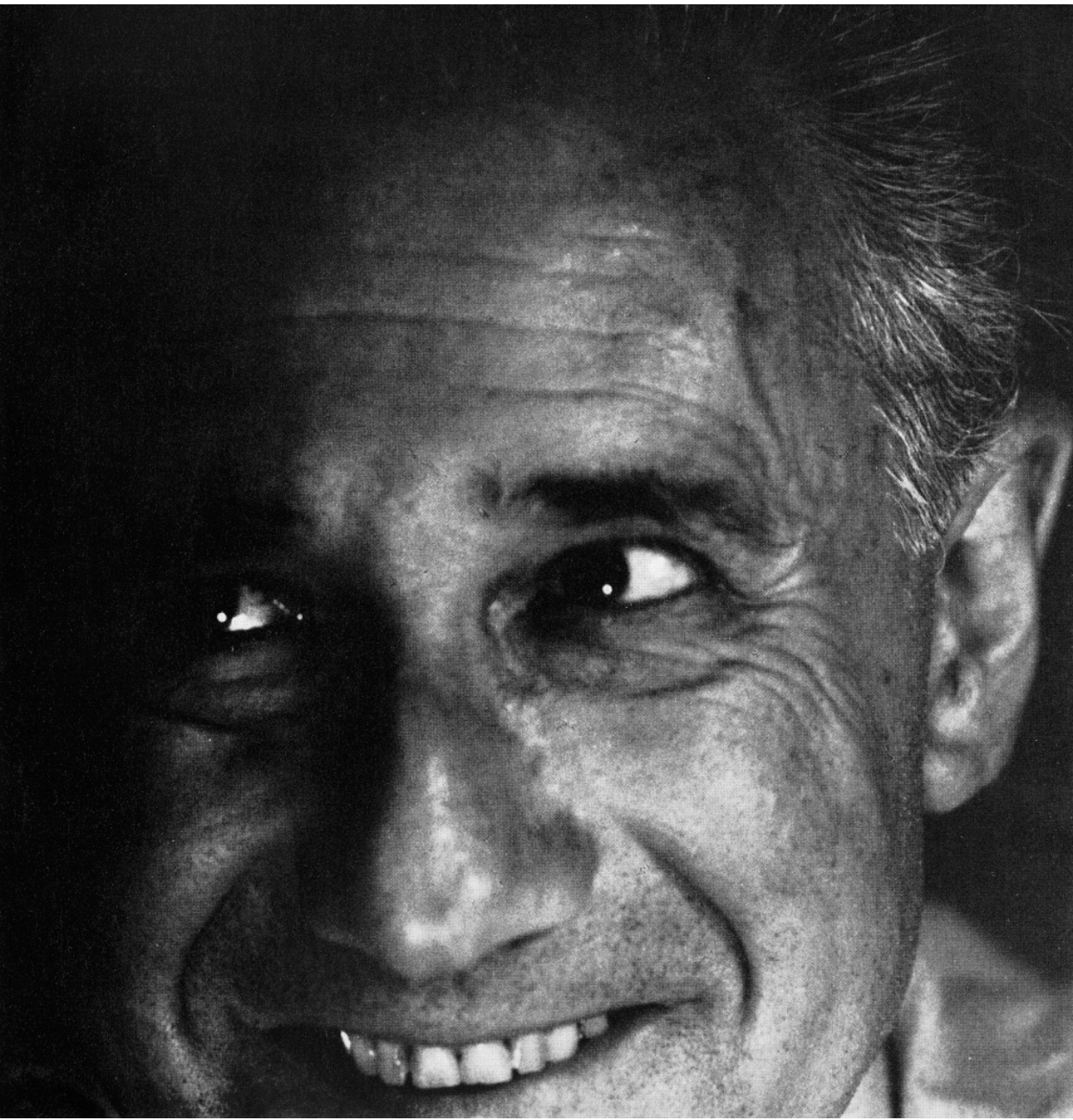
- Born: March 14, 1916; Turin, Italy
- Died: April 14, 2005 (aged 89); Milan, Italy
- Other names: Gentili, Gentili Tedeschi
- Education: Turin Politecnico
- Occupation: Architect
- Spouse: Isolda Felici in 1947
- Awards: IN-ARCH Prize (Istituo Nazionale di Architecture), 1963
- Practice: Studio Architetto Eugenio Gentili Tedeschi 1946-1989 Architetti Associati Eugenio Gentili Tedeschi, Gianni Calzà, Andrea Savio 1989-2005
- Buildings: Heichal David u-Mordechai Synagogue, Porta Garibaldi Station, Italfarmaco complex,
- Projects: Restoration of Orfanotrofio San Felice, Pavia
- Design: for Fontana Arte -- Tedeschi Hanging Lamp; YoYo lamps

Eugenio Gentili Tedeschi (1916–2005) was an Italian architect, designer, teacher and writer active in Italian building and product design from the 1940s until his death in 2005. Through his popular lectures while professor of design at Milan Politecnico and through his numerous books, he influenced many of the designers and architects working in Italy and abroad today. The United States Holocaust Memorial Museum and the Jewish Partisan Educational Foundation have recognized Gentili for his actions in the Italian Resistance in the Val d'Aosta during World War 2. His architectural legacy in the form of buildings can be seen in Milan and elsewhere in Italy today.

== Early years ==
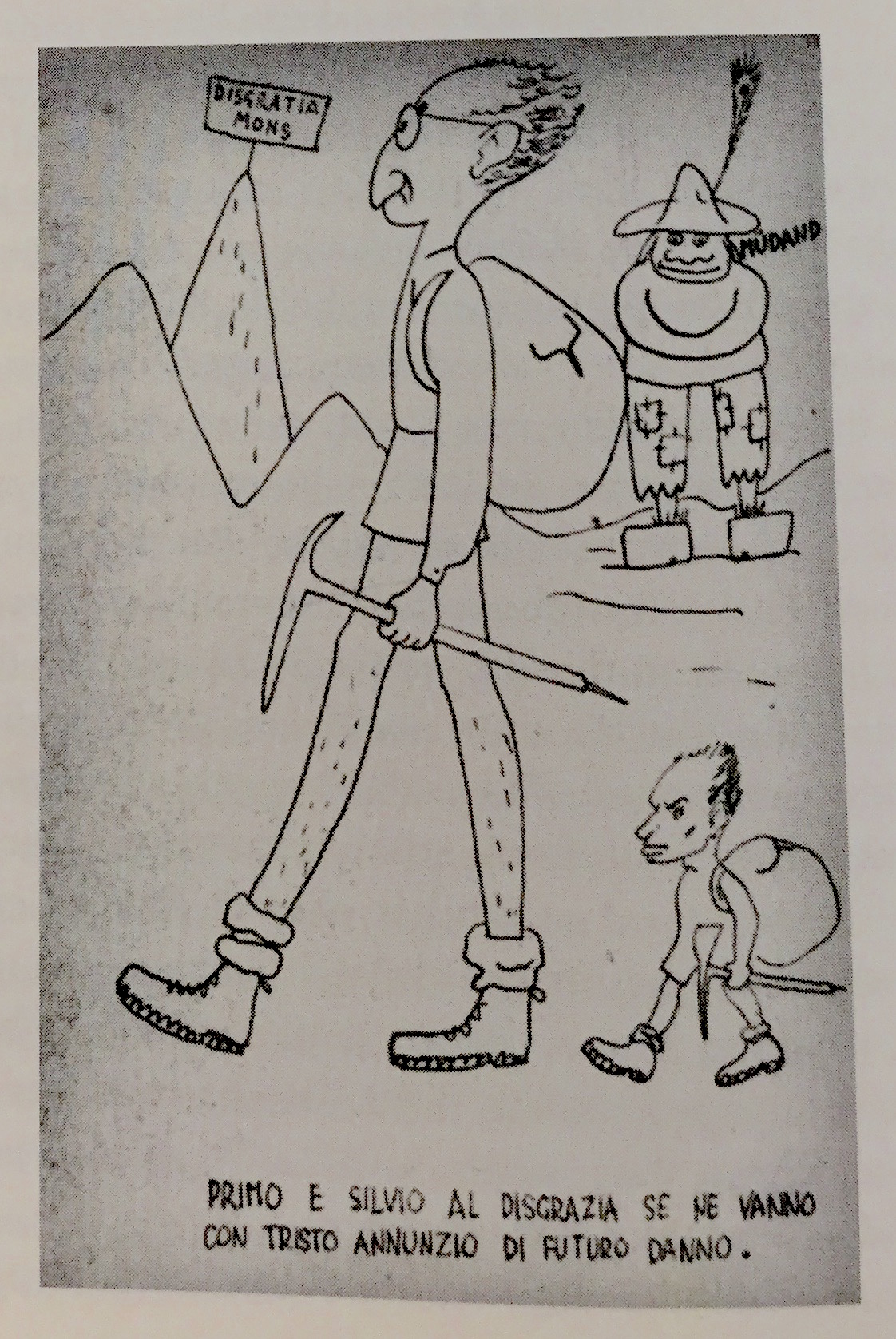
Tedeschi's sketch of Primo Levi leading the way on a hike in the Alps.

Eugenio Gentili Tedeschi was born to Jewish parents in Turin in 1916 where he had his early schooling. In 1935 he began university studies in architecture at Politecnico di Torino in its architecture division, completing his undergraduate studies in 1939 and his graduate work 1940. Concurrently, Gentili was also a student of the painter Felice Casorati until 1941. As a student in the late 1930s he formed a close, lasting friendship with the chemist and writer, Primo Levi, who knew him as "Euge" and with whom he shared a love of mountain climbing.

== Architect ==
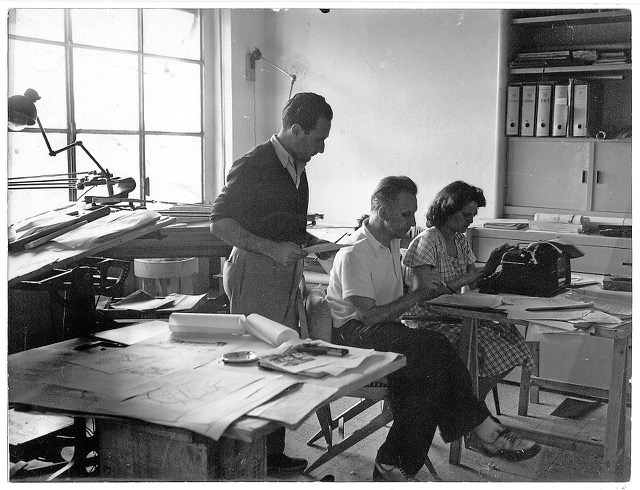
Eugenio Gentili Tedeschi in his Milan studio with two colleagues.

Gentili's professional formation took place during the period when modern architecture and Rationalism were extremely influential in Italy, strongly promoted by the design magazine, Casabella and the writings of the magazine's editor Giuseppe Pagano and the publisher-art-critic-designer, Edoardo Persico. Persico held the 'Profezia dell'Architettura" conference (The Prophecy of Architecture) in Turin in January 1935, which the 19-year old Gentili attended. The 1930s also saw the rise of Fascism and the Italian Racial Laws promulgated in 1938, which banned Jews from academia, politics, finance, the professional world, and most sectors of public and private life.

In 1941, Gio Ponti, one of Italy's leading designers of the day, in direct defiance of the law, hired Gentili. Gentili worked in Ponti's studio until late 1943, when Gentili, who was active in the anti-fascist underground, was forced to flee Milan for his own safety. [See § World War Two Years below.]

In early spring 1945, he moved to Rome, where, with Bruno Zevi, Cino Calcaprina, Saverio Muratori, Silvio Radiconcini, Mario Ridolfi, he co-founded Metron, the first architecture magazine published in Italy after the war. [See § Publishing below.]

In 1946, he opened his own practice in Milan, Studio Eugenio Gentili Tedeschi. In 1948 he was asked to join the MSA (Movimento di Studi per l'Architettura), the only architect in Italy to belong to both the Associazione per l’architettura organica (APAO) and MSA. He participated in the Milan Triennial in 1947, 1951 and 1954, eventually joining its board, where he remained active for many years.

=== Public buildings ===
- Heichal David u-Mordechai Synagogue - The original synagogue on via Guastalla was heavily damaged during the bombardments of Milan 1940–44, which had completely destroyed the interior, leaving only the facade. In 1946 the Jewish community of Milan opened a competition to Jewish architects, for the reconstruction of the building. The first prize was shared by Gentili and Manfredi d'Urbino. Under Gentili's management, the synagogue was rebuilt between 1951 and 1953.
- Porta Garibaldi Station - In 1957 the Italian Railways and the City of Milan announced an architectural competition for the design of a new railway station in the location of Porta Garibaldi. Gentili, with a team that included Giulio Minoletti and Mario Tevarotto, tied for first prize for their design with the Roman architectural firm, Bonamico, F.&G. Gigli and Janicelli). The two teams together developed the project for the new station, which was based mostly on the Milanese scheme. The station was completed in 1963.
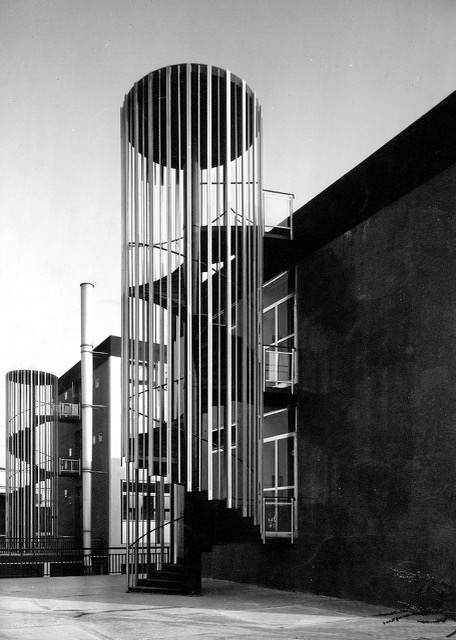
  Tedeschi's spiral staircase, detail from the Italfarmaco headquarters, Milan.
- Italfarmaco complex - This project won the IN-ARCH prize (Istituto Nazionale di Architettura) in 1963. In the influential Italian design magazine, DOMUS in 1963, Gio’ Ponti praised the Italfarmaco project for its daring use of space, singling out the exterior spiral staircase for special praise: "The elevations of these stairs, their clarity and sharpness, their structural elegance, their design and "lines" encapsulate the values of this architecture, and in turn represent the values of Gentili's oeuvre as architect."
- LASA (Laboratorio Acceleratori Superconduttività Applicata) - The LASA building was commissioned by the Italian National Institute of Nuclear Physics as a new center for scientific research capable of containing a large cyclotron. It was built between 1983 and 1987 in Segrate just outside Milan, on an area owned by the Università degli Studi of Milan. The complex is composed of four connecting volumes that are of varying dimensions and heights: the office building with a square plan layout, the large hangar for the cyclotron and its control areas, the mechanical building and the workshop.
- L.I.T.A. (Laboratorio Interdisciplinare di Tecnologie Avanzate) - L.I.T.A. was commissioned by the Università degli Studi of Milan as a 24,000 square meter center for research and teaching of bio-medical sciences. It was built between 1987 and 1995 in Segrate, on an area adjacent LASA.
- Orfanotrofio San Felice - The Monastery of San Felice (15-19th centuries), a monumental complex in the historic center of Pavia, which had been converted to an orphanage in the 18th century, was restored by E. Gentili Tedeschi, G.Calzà, A.Savio Architect Associate in three phases from 1993 to 1999: restoration of the refectory and its annex, which became the library; reconfiguration of the three main wings and the main courtyard; and new construction around the east courtyard. Today the building is the seat of the Economics and Philosophy faculties of the University of Pavia, containing classrooms, libraries and offices.

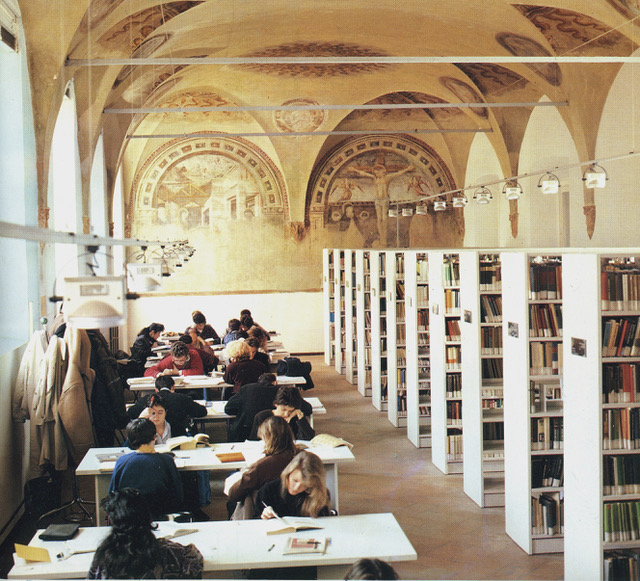
The former refectory of the Monastery of San Felice in Pavia, now part of the University of Pavia, school of engineering.

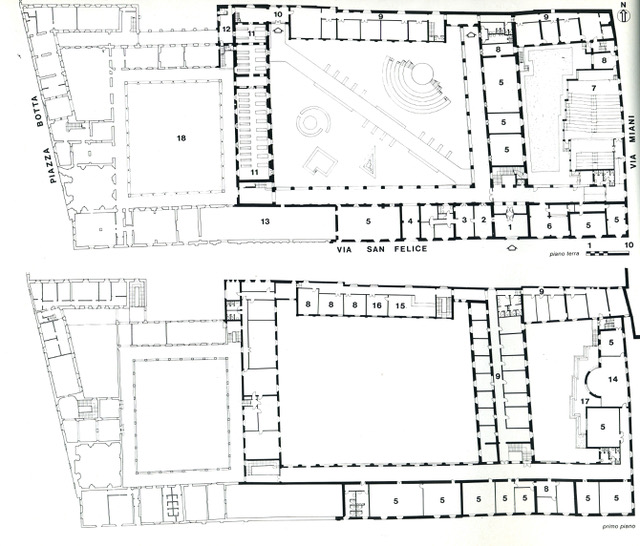
Design of the Monasterio restoration.

Towards the end of the 1990s the Studio Associato (Tedeschi with architects Gianni Calzà and Andrea Savio) began the restoration of vintage movie theaters in Milan. A few historic ones, like the Ducale, Excelsior, Mignon and Arcobaleno in the center of Milan were transformed into multiplexes through respectful redesign that allows the classic structures to retain their original historic features.

== Teacher ==
Gentili taught throughout his career as an architect. His began teaching in 1955, when he was invited to join Franco Albini, Ignazio Gardella and Ludovico Belgioioso as assistant at the Venice University Institute of Architecture, where he obtained professorship in 1959 teaching interior design with Albini. In 1964, he began teaching at the Politecnico di Milano in Milan, as professor of Architectural Composition, and then director of that department in 1972–73. He became a tenured professor there in 1981, where remained until his retirement in 1986. A collection of year of his architecture lectures at the Faculty of Architecture of the Politecnico di Milano was published as "Milano - i segni della storia" (Milan - the markings of history) in 1988 by Alinea, Florence.

== World War Two Years ==
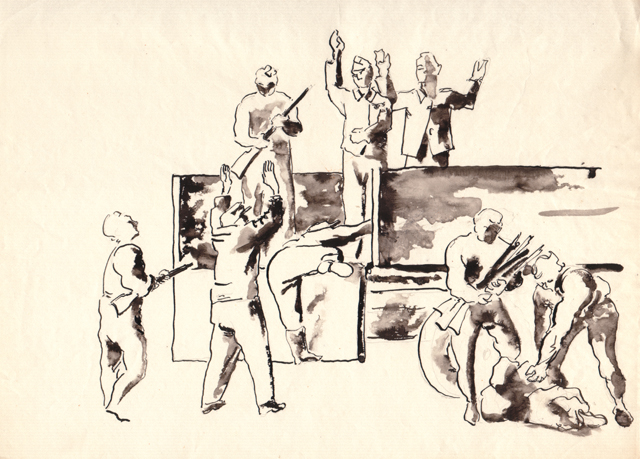
Tedeschi sketch of partisan capture of German troops on the Alps, 1944.

Gentili took part in the Italian resistance movement and fought alongside the Partisans in the Aosta Valley (in northwestern Italy at the border with France). He was denounced in June 1944, arrested and imprisoned in Turin. He was released in a matter of weeks, after Gentili's father and girlfriend were able to raise the 30,000 lire needed to bribe the police superintendent in Turin to turn him free. In the winter of 1944/45 he managed to elude the Nazi roundups and crossed the Alps into France to safety. In early 1945, he returned to Italy with the Allied forces, going first to Rome. His sketches from that period chronicle different aspects of the partisans' operations.

== Publishing ==
In Rome the spring of 1945, with Cino Calcaprina, Saverio Muratori, Silvio Radiconcini, Mario Ridolfi and Bruno Zevi, he was co-founder and publisher of Metron, the first postwar architecture magazine in Italy, and served on its editorial board. Later that year, he returned to Milan with the task of promoting Metron among local architects. Metron's influence was due to its close association with the Associazione Per l'Architettura Organica (A.P.A.O.) and became the platform advocating that Italian public architecture return to its organic roots—that it be "modeled on the human scale," in the words of Bruno Zevi, the principal proponent of "organic architecture".

Gentili's longest lasting association in publishing was with Abitare, which he joined in 1961 and helped shape the character of for the following decade and a half. Abitare soon established itself as a leading design publication, featuring the works of, and publishing articles by, some of the leading architects, designers and artists of the day. When Tedeschi began his association with the founding publisher, Piera Perone, the magazine was called Casa Novità. Gentili and Perone relaunched it as Abitare in 1962 and featured an introductory article by Gentili and a main feature he commissioned on the work Gino Becker, a former colleague. He continued his close association with Abitare until 1976, working with subsequent editorial directors, including Franca Santi, with whom he shared the role of editor-in-chief for a period. He continued as a contributor to Abitare until 1979, writing some 40 articles for the magazine in all.

== Books & Articles ==
- “Elementi di Architettura” - ed. Tamburini - Milano, 1965
- “I componenti della progettazione” - ed. Franco Angeli - Milano, 1980
- “Uno spazio per l’architettura” - ed. Franco Angeli - Milano, 1982
- “La cultura del progetto” con AA.VV. - CLUP, Milano 1985 (II° edizione 2003)
- “Milano, i segni della storia” - ed. ALINEA - Firenze, 1988
- “Il Design: un approccio metodologico” - ed. Città Studi - Milano, 1992
- “Le Corbusier a Villa Adriana” - con G. Denti - ed. ALINEA - Firenze, 1999
- "Testimonianze" - ed. ALINEA - Firenze, 2006
