= Milan Triennial V =

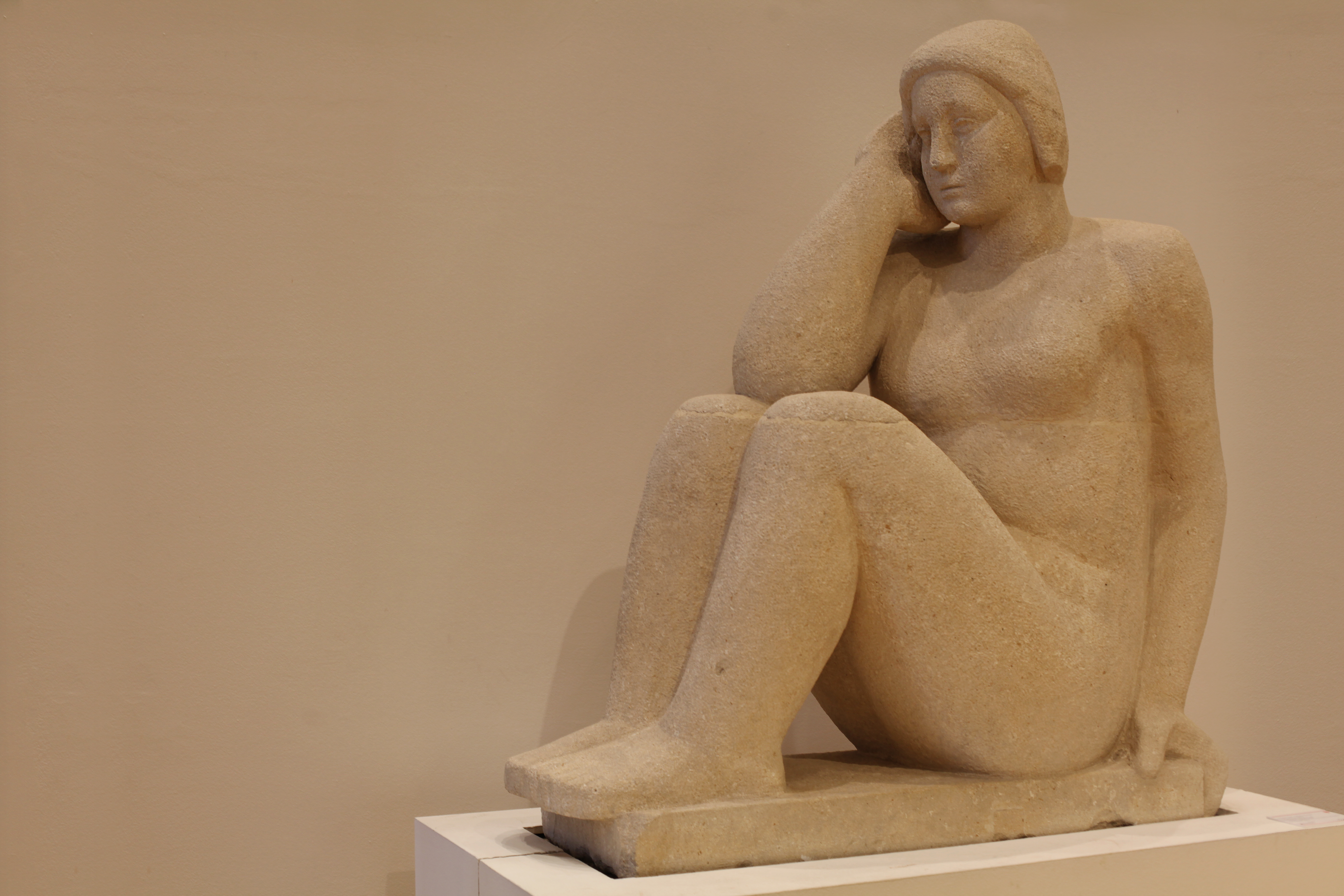
- Sitting Woman by Leone Lodi and Mario Sironi created for the show

Overview
- BIE-class: Triennial exposition
- Name: Milan Triennial V
- Building(s): Palazzo dell'Arte

Participant(s)
- Countries: 11

Location
- Country: Italy
- City: Milan
- Coordinates: 45°28′19.92″N 9°10′24.78″E

Timeline
- Awarded: 27 October 1932
- Opening: 10 May 1933
- Closure: 31 October 1933

Triennial expositions
- Previous: Monza Biennial IV in Monza
- Next: Milan Triennial VI in Milan

The Milan Triennial V was the first to be held at the Palazzo dell'Arte (seat of the Triennale di Milano), the first recognised by the Bureau of International Expositions and also the first to be a triennial event (having previously been held biennially) and the first in Milan (instead of Monza).

== Contents ==
The Parco Sempione was used to hold 40 temporary pavilions, and a permanent building, the then Torre Littoria, now Torre Branca designed by Gio Ponti.

Displays included mural paintings by De Chirico, Sironi, Campigli and Carlo Carrà.

=== Prizes ===
The Grand Prix was awarded to Elsa Elenius, Maija Kansanen-Størseth and to Harry Röneholm (for exhibition display); Eva Brummer had an honorary mention; Alvar Aalto, Eva Anttila and Toini Muona won gold medals; Friedl Kjellberg and Werner West silver and Dora Jung, Kurt Ekholm, Gunnel Gustafsson (Nyman) and Jussi Mäntynen all won bronze medals.
