= Milan Triennial XI =

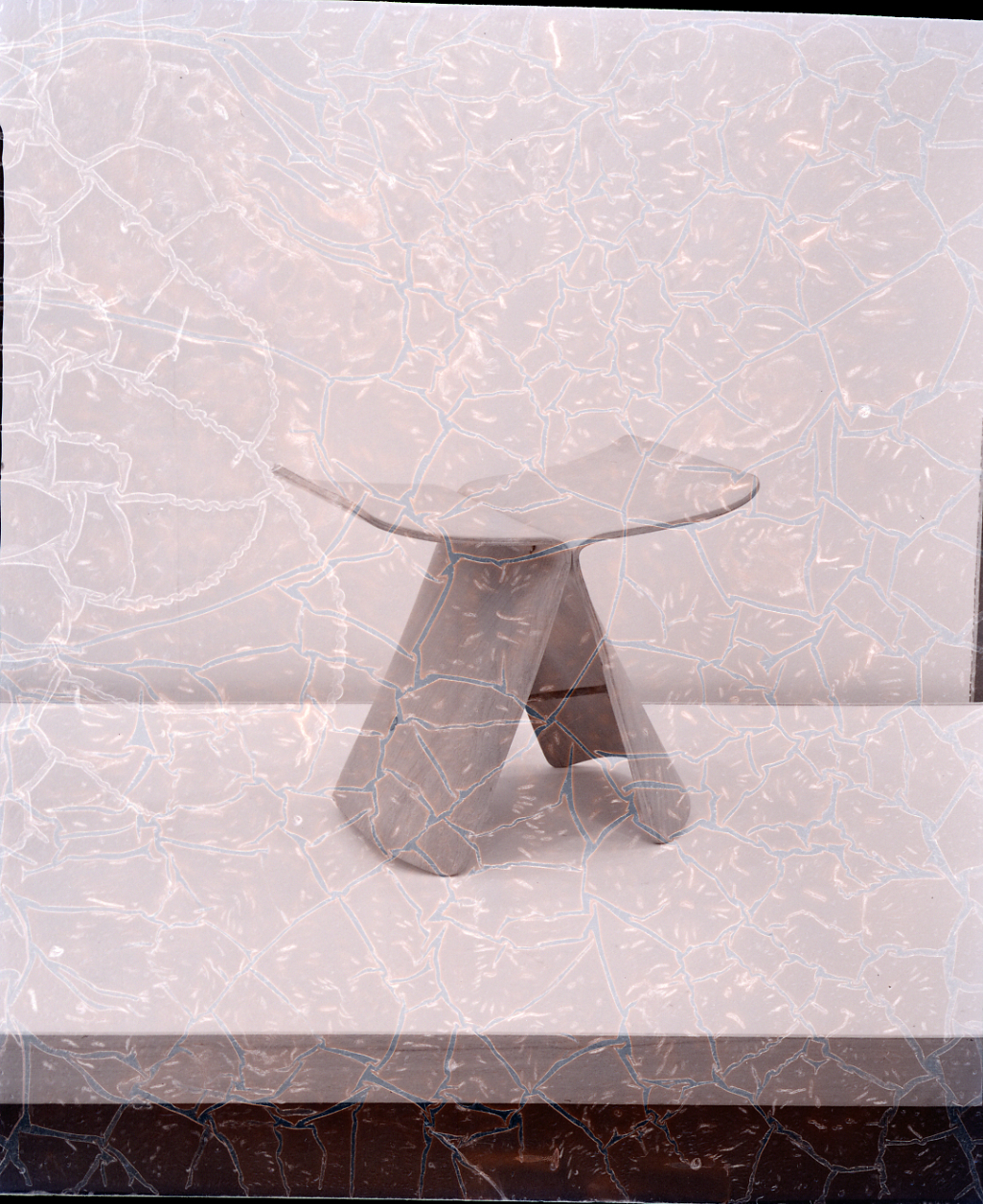
- Yanagi Butterfly stool at the triennial

Overview
- BIE-class: Triennial exposition
- Name: Milan Triennial XI
- Motto: Improving the Quality of Expression in Today’s Civilisation
- Building(s): Triennale
- Area: Parco Sempione

Participant(s)
- Countries: 19

Location
- Country: Italy
- City: Milan
- Coordinates: 45°28′19.92″N 9°10′24.78″E

Timeline
- Awarded: 15 May 1956
- Opening: 27 July 1957
- Closure: 4 November 1957

Triennial expositions
- Previous: Milan Triennial X in Milan
- Next: Milan Triennial XII in Milan

The Milan Triennial XI was the Triennial in Milan of 1957 sanctioned by the Bureau of International Expositions (BIE). Its theme was Improving the Quality of Expression in Today’s Civilisation.

== Contents ==
There was a survey of sculpture of the previous 50 years, showing works by Umberto Boccioni, Constantin Brâncuși, Alexander Calder, Arturo Martini, Henri Matisse, Henry Moore, Pablo Picasso, Pierre-Auguste Renoir and Auguste Rodin.

Gillo Dorfles, Leonardo Ricci, Luigi Rosselli and Marco Zanuso organised an industrial product exhibition. And Agnoldomenico Pica an architecture section.

Timo Sarpaneva won 2 Grand Prix, Kaj Franck, Dora Jung and Kyllikki Salmenhaara one each. Antti Nurmesniemi, Yki Nummi, Ilmari Tapiovaara, Vuokko Eskolin, Bertel Gardberg and Sori Yanagi won gold medals, Yanagi's for his butterfly stool. Saara Hopea won a silver medal for her flamingo liqueur glasswork.

The USA pavilion was designed by Walter Dorwin Teague and Paul McCobb.
