= Hongell =

Hongell is a surname. Notable people with the surname include:

- Göran Hongell (1902–1973), Finnish designer
- Hilda Hongell (1867–1952), Finnish architect
