= Lisa Johansson =

Lisa Johansson may refer to:

- Lina Johansson (born 1988), Swedish figure skater
- Lisa Johansson (footballer) (born 2005), Swedish footballer
- Lisa Johansson (ice hockey) (born 1992), Swedish ice hockey player
- Lisa Johansson (singer), member of Swedish Gothic doom/death metal band Draconian
- Lisa Johansson-Pape (1907–1989), Finnish designer
