= Milan Triennial X =

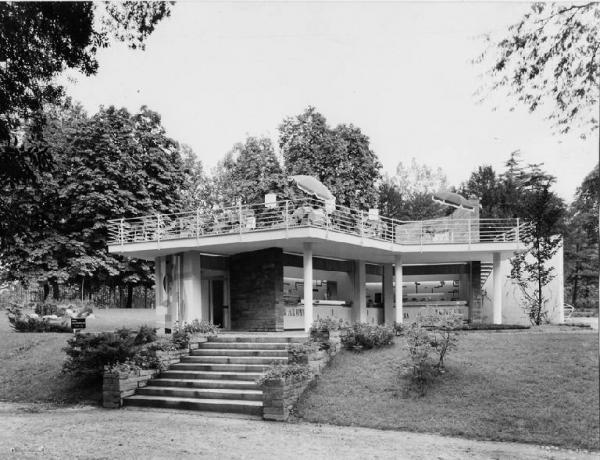
- Bar Bianco built for the triennial

Overview
- BIE-class: Triennial exposition
- Name: Milan Triennial X
- Motto: Prefabrication - Industrial Design
- Building(s): Palazzo del Arte

Participant(s)
- Countries: 16

Location
- Country: Italy
- City: Milan
- Coordinates: 45°28′19.92″N 9°10′24.78″E

Timeline
- Awarded: 5 November 1953
- Opening: 28 August 1954
- Closure: 22 November 1954

Triennial expositions
- Previous: Milan Triennial IX in Milan
- Next: Milan Triennial XI in Milan

The Milan Triennial X was the Triennial in Milan sanctioned by the Bureau of International Expositions (BIE) on the 5 November 1953. Its theme was Prefabrication - Industrial Design. It was held at the Palazzo dell'Arte and ran from 28 August 1954 to 22 November 1954.

Timo Sarpaneva, Tapio Wirkkala and Dora Jung all won Grand Prix, with Rut Bryk, Kaj Franck, Kyllikki Salmenhaara and Toini Muona receiving honorable mentions. Lisa Johansson-Pape, Göran Hongell, Antti Nurmesniemi, Ilmari Tapiovaara, Yki Nummi, Bertel Gardberg, Friedl Kjellberg and Ico Parisi all won gold medals and Michael Schilkin and Saara Hopea silver ones.
