= Toini Muona =

Finnish ceramic artist (1904–1987)

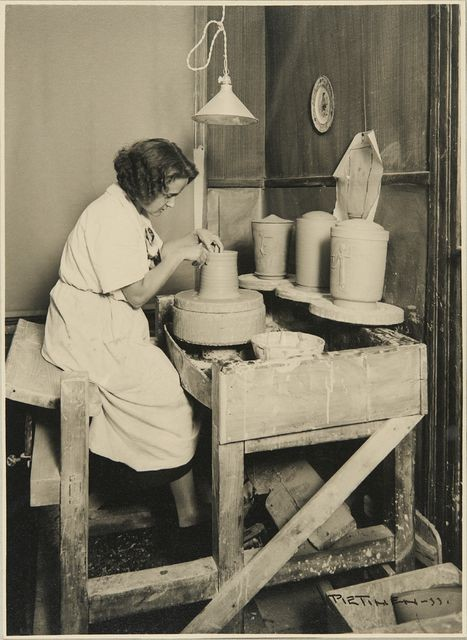
- Muona in 1936
- Born: 19 November 1904; Helsinki, Grand Duchy of Finland
- Died: 23 June 1987 (aged 82); Helsinki, Finland
- Education: Taideteollinen keskuskoulu
- Known for: Ceramic art; industrial design in ceramics and glass
- Awards: Pro Finlandia (1957); Finnish State Prize for Design (1970)

Toini Muona (19 November 1904 – 23 June 1987) was a leading Finnish ceramist and glass artist of the 1930s–60s, described as the Grande Dame of Finnish ceramic art, and recognised as a central figure in the pre- and post-war rise of Finnish design on the international stage.

== Education ==
Muona completed only four years of primary school, after which she studied arts & crafts at a vocational school. From there, she continued to the Central School of Industrial Arts (Taideteollinen keskuskoulu; now part of Aalto University School of Arts, Design and Architecture) to receive training in technical drawing, finishing in 1926.

Muona trained as a ceramics designer in the Ateneum (part of the Finnish National Gallery) ceramics studio from 1926 to 1932. She later continued her studies in Faenza, Italy, in the late 1930s, as well as conducting several study trips to the USA and, towards the end of her active career, to China and Egypt.

== Design career ==
Apart from a short stint in a private design studio at the start of her career, Muona's main contribution as both an industrial designer and ceramic artist came at Finland's leading ceramics manufacturer, Arabia, where she worked for nearly four decades, from 1931 until her retirement in 1970.

Her design language has been described as 'spontaneous' and 'monumental', based on natural forms; her long and slender 'reed' vases and large platters and bowls from the 1950s are iconic, and have influenced generations of Finnish and European designers. Towards the end of her career her designs became simpler and more geometric. The colour palette of her glazes is limited yet often dramatic. She was known for her daring, experimental design ideas and techniques, and for her constant innovation, pushing the boundaries of the medium and of herself.

Although primarily known as a ceramist, Muona also worked as a glass artist at the Nuutajärvi Glassworks in the late 1960s.

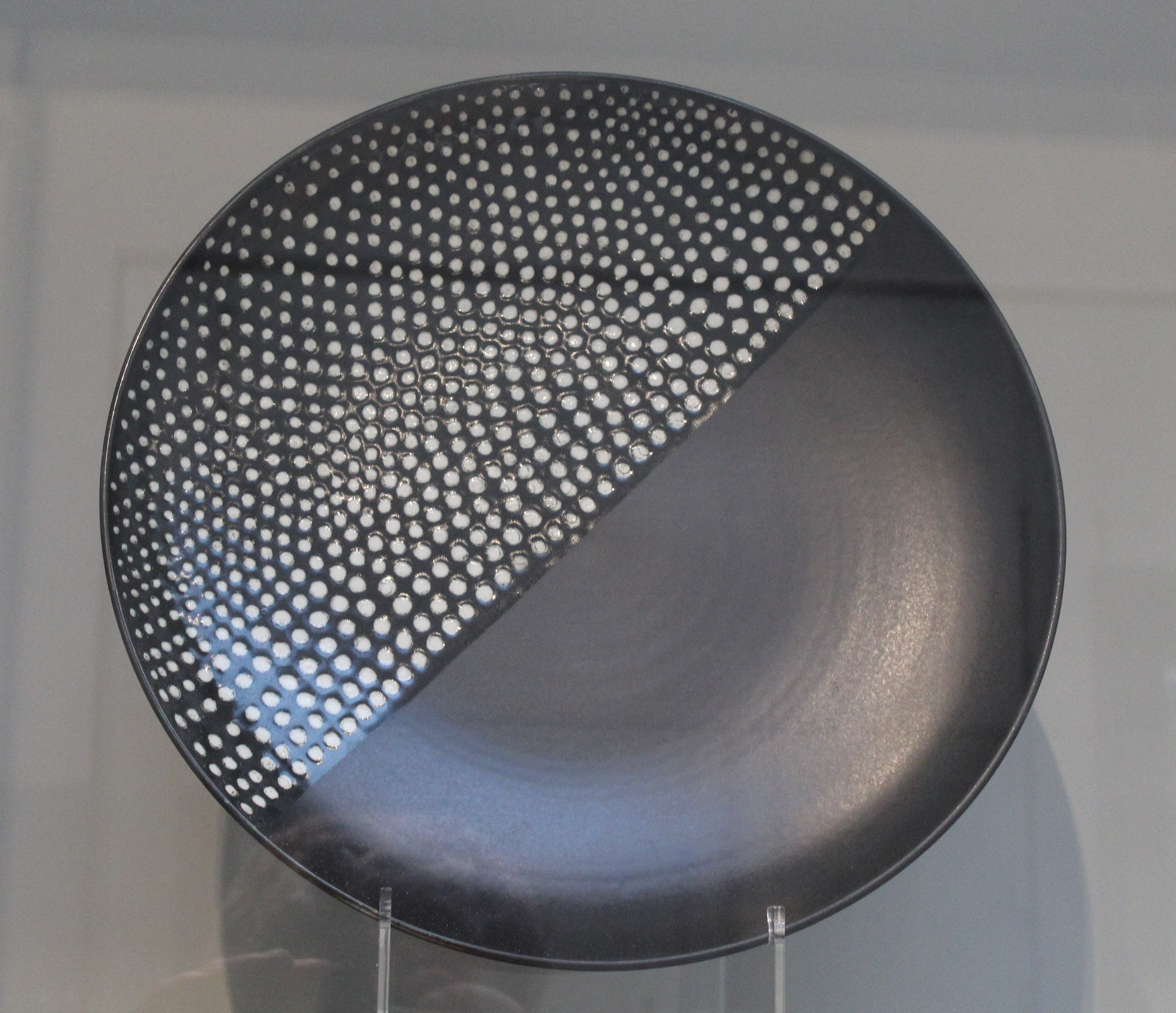
Dish by Toini Muona, made c. 1968-70. Stoneware with painted and incised decoration in semi-matt and glossy black glazes. (Victoria and Albert Museum, item number C.57-1987)

== Exhibitions and recognition ==
Muona's debut solo exhibition was held in Helsinki in 1930. This was followed by further exhibitions in Helsinki and Turku, and a career retrospective at the Alvar Aalto Museum in Jyväskylä in 1970.

She received several international design awards, including at Milan Triennials (gold medals in 1933 and 1951, Diplome d'Honneur in 1954), gold medals in Brussels (1935) and Paris (1937), as well as silver at the Exposition Internationale Céramique in Cannes (1955).

Her works are included in the permanent collections of museums including the V&A in London, the Swedish National Museum, and the Alvar Aalto Museum.

In 1957, she was awarded the Pro Finlandia medal of the Order of the Lion of Finland.

In 1970, Muona received the Finnish State Prize for Design in recognition of her career.

In 1998, a street (Toini Muonan katu) and a small park (Toini Muonan puisto) in Helsinki were named after her.
