= Ponte delle Sirenette =

Bridge in Milan

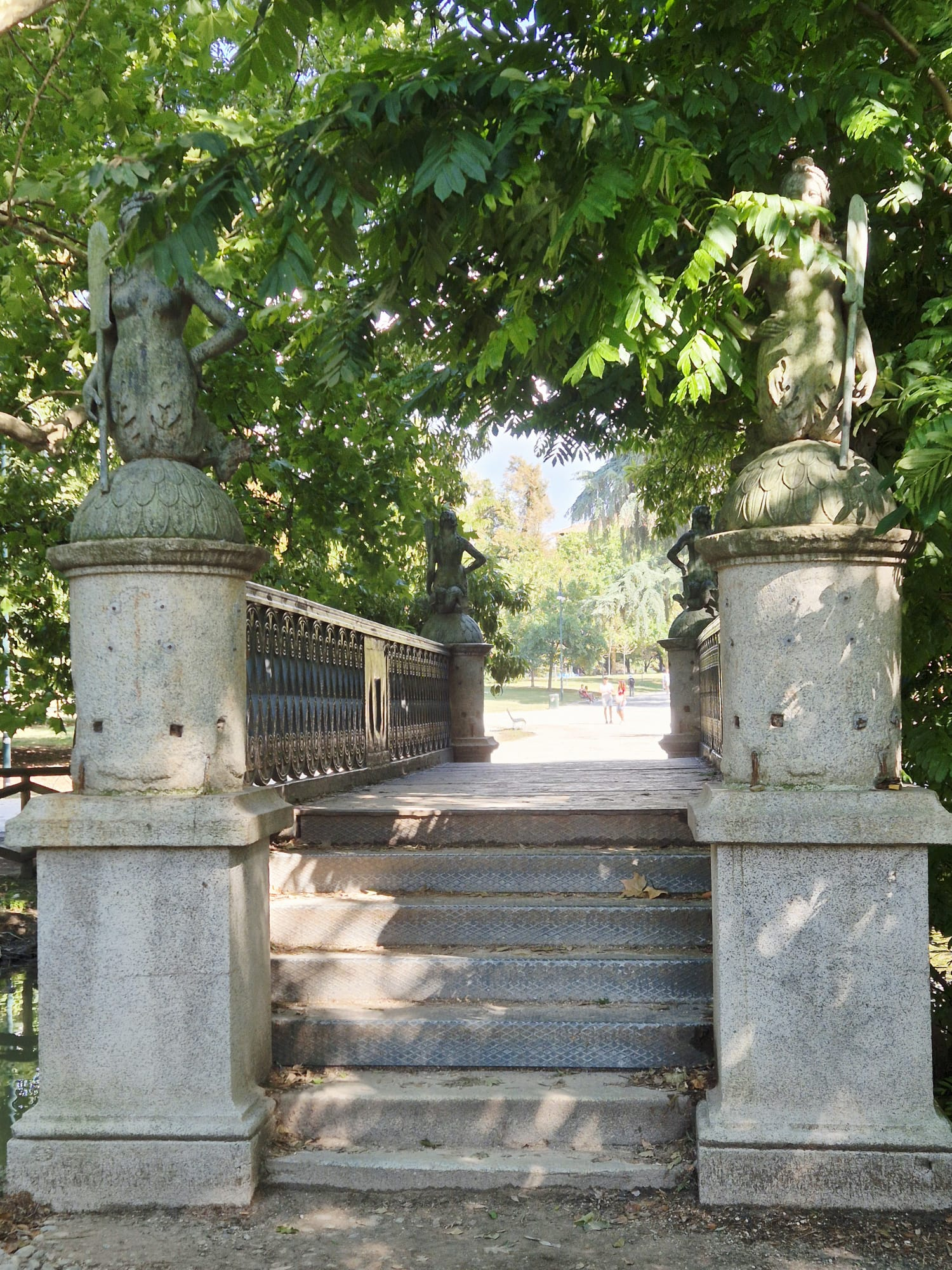
- Coordinates: 45.473111°N 9.176689°E
- Crosses: Navigli
- Locale: Milan (Italy)

Characteristics
- Material: Cast iron

History
- Architect: Francesco Tettamanzi
- Construction start: 1840
- Construction end: 1842

Location
- Click on the map for a fullscreen view

Ponte delle Sirenette (Little Mermaids Bridge in English language) is a bridge in Milan (Italy), connecting to Parco Sempione. It was originalli punt in Via Visconti di Modrone, but today is part of Parco sempione.

== History ==
The bridge was built according to the designs of architect Francesco Tettamanzi between 1840 and 1842 by the society "Rubini-Scalini-Falck e C." of Dongo. It is considered the first wrought iron bridge built in Italy. The decorations were created from plaster models by Benedetto Cacciatori. The bridge was commissioned by private people to be erected over the canal Navigli in Via San Damiano (today Via Uberto Visconti di Modrone).

On the parapets are two Latin inscriptions commemorating the construction of the first iron bridge in Milan in 1841, during the reign of Ferdinand I of Austria.

A mermaid holding an oar is placed on each end pier. These were originally decorated with cast iron friezes. Photographs from the period also show decoration on the side of the arch.

The bridge was inaugurated on June 23, 1842, by Rainier of Austria, viceroy of the Kingdom of Lombardy–Venetia.

In 1943, one of the statues was severely damaged during a bombing raid. Another statue was stolen in 1948.

== Popular tradition ==
- Over time, the mermaids were jokingly nicknamed the "Ghisini sisters" (because of the material used, cast iron, in Italian ghisa = cast iron)
- Milanese lovers kiss themselves on the bridge, touching the backs of the statues, hoping to attract fertility and prosperity.

== Gallery ==
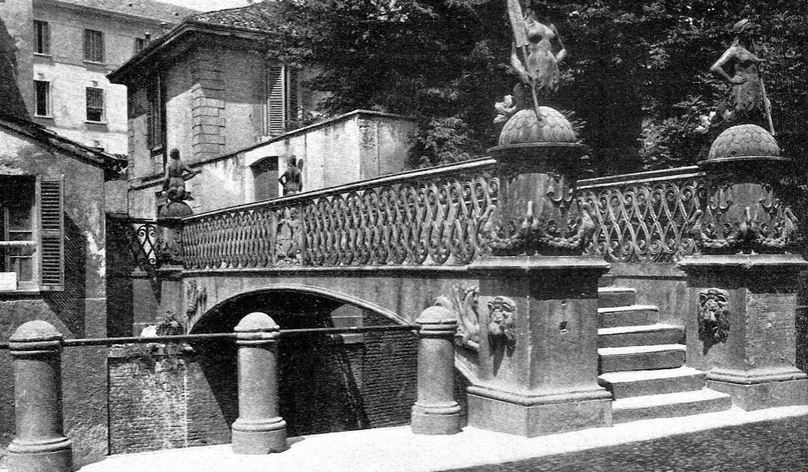
The bridge, originally in Via Visconti di Modrone, along the Navigli, was moved to the Parco Sempione after they were filled in.

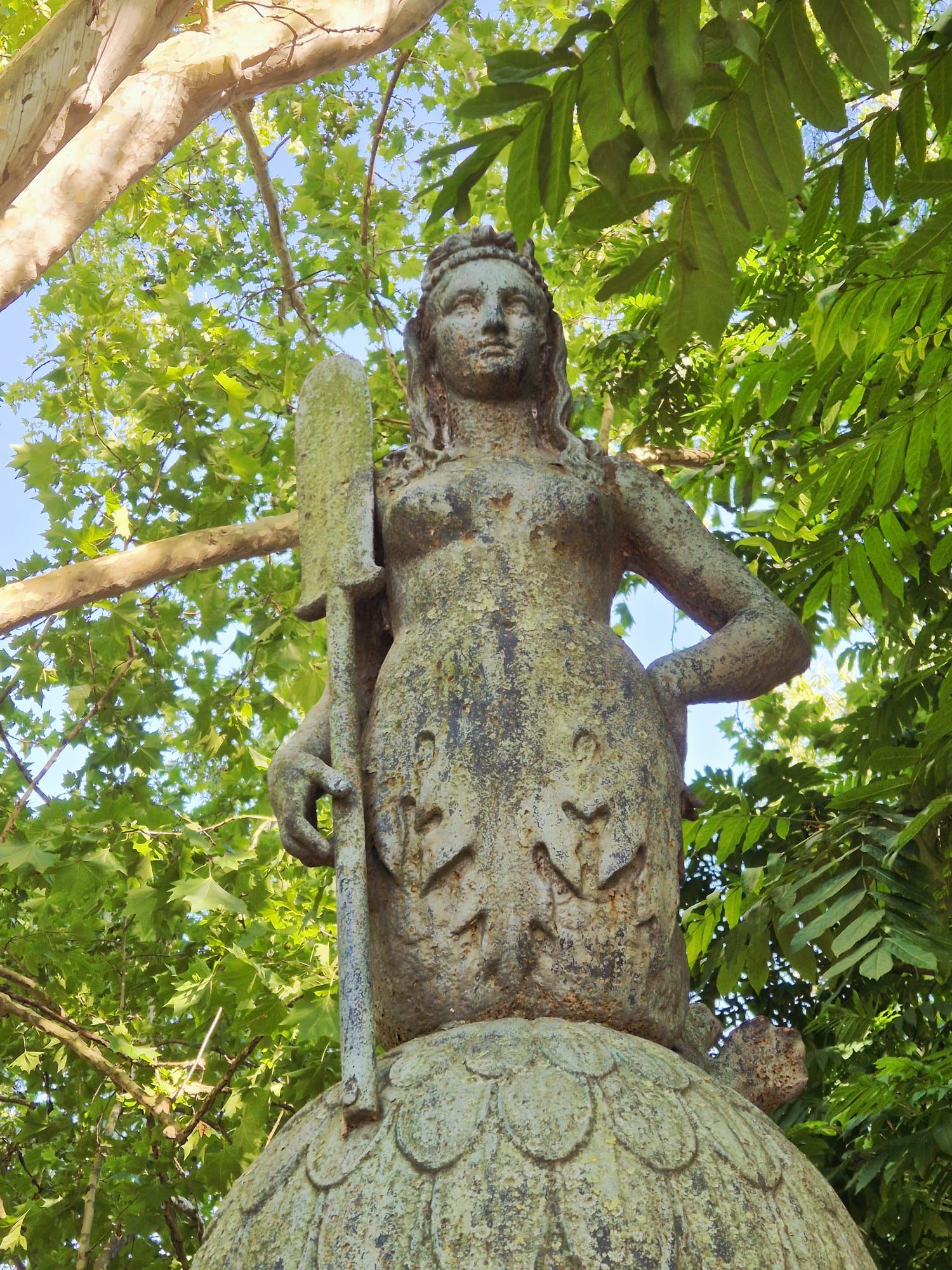
Detail of one of the four statues with its oar.

== Bibliography ==
- Enzo Pifferi, Laura Tettamanzi and Emilio Magni (1987). Da Milano lungo i Navigli. Milan: Editrice E.P.I.
- Giuseppe Pederiali (2011). Il ponte delle Sirenette. Milan: Garzanti. ISBN 978-88-11-68199-1.
