= Friedl Kjellberg =

Austrian-born Finnish ceramist

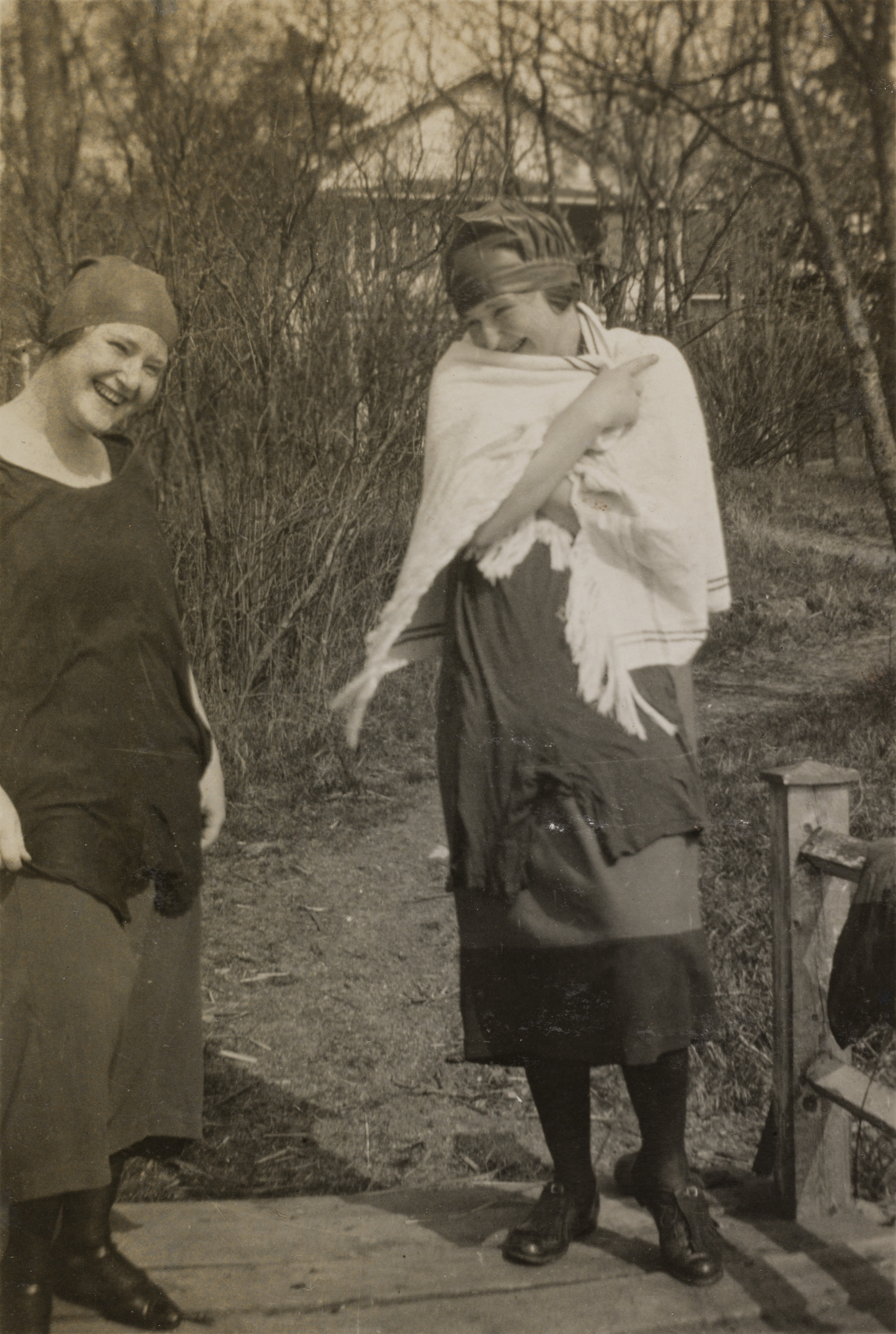
- Friedl Holzer, on the right, with her sister Maria, pictured in Helsinki in 1925
- Born: Elfriede Amalie Adolfine Holzer; 24 October 1905; Leoben, Austria-Hungary
- Died: 11 September 1993 (aged 87); Porvoo, Finland
- Education: Kunstgewerbeschule Graz
- Known for: Rice grain porcelain
- Spouse: Erik Kjellberg (m. 1932)

Friedl Kjellberg (née Holzer, from 1932 Holzer-Kjellberg; 24 October 1905 — 11 September 1993) was an Austrian-Finnish ceramicist, noted especially for her work with the so-called 'rice grain' method of porcelain-making.

== Career ==
Friedl Holzer studied art and design in her native Austria, at the Kunstgewerbeschule design school in Graz, and upon graduating was offered a position as a designer at the Arabia ceramics manufacturer in Helsinki, Finland. She joined the company in 1924, and stayed there her entire career, until her retirement 46 years later in 1971.

In 1932, Friedl Holzer married her colleague at Arabia, engineer Erik Kjellberg, and was thereafter alternately known both as Friedl Kjellberg and Holzer-Kjellberg.

Kjellberg's design style has been characterised as 'modern classicism'; based on tradition, but tempered by clean simplicity. She is known to have been inspired and influenced throughout her life by the methods and shapes of Chinese ceramics.

In contrast to her delicate 'rice grain porcelain' designs (see next section), many of her later works make use of bold designs and striking colours, such as blood red and turquoise, achieved using special glazes and firing techniques.

=== Rice grain porcelain ===
Kjellberg is perhaps best known for her rice grain porcelain, a method she first discovered during a 1931 study trip to Vienna: a 17th-century Chinese dish on display at the Museum of Applied Arts had been decorated in this manner, inspiring her to experiment with the technique.

By this method, small oblong holes are cut in the ceramic object prior to glazing; the glaze fills the hole, thus creating a translucent area reminiscent of a grain of rice.

Kjellberg worked for 11 years developing the method, before launching her first collection in 1942. It was an instant success, despite the high price due to the labour-intensive and time-consuming production method, and her rice grain porcelain designs remained in the Arabia product range until 1974.

She felt burdened to some extent by the popularity of her rice grain works and under pressure to create yet more designs using the method, when she herself was keen to move to new ideas and experiments.

Kjellberg's rice grain designs were a notable success story of the Finnish 1940s and 1950s industrial design, and have left a lasting legacy.

== Recognition ==
=== Exhibitions ===
Kjellberg's designs were shown at the International Expositions in Barcelona (1929), Brussels (1935) and Paris (1937).

=== Collections ===
Besides Arabia's own design museum in Helsinki, Kjellberg's works are included in the permanent collections of the Universalmuseum Joanneum in Graz, the Museum of Design, Zürich and the Stedelijk Museum Amsterdam, as well as several museums in Scandinavia and Germany.

Her Helmi (1969) (lit. 'Pearl') rice grain porcelain set (cup, saucer, side plate and creamer) is included in the British Museum collection.

=== Awards and honours ===
Kjellberg won a silver medal at the 5th Milan Triennial (1933), and gold at the 10th edition (1954), as well as silver at Cannes (1955).

In 1962, she was awarded the Pro Finlandia medal of the Order of the Lion of Finland.
