= Milan Triennial IX =

Exhibition in Milan, Italy

Overview
- BIE-class: Triennial exposition
- Name: Milan Triennial IX
- Motto: Goods - Standard
- Building(s): Palazzo del Arte

Participant(s)
- Countries: 13

Location
- Country: Italy
- City: Milan
- Coordinates: 45°28′19.92″N 9°10′24.78″E

Timeline
- Awarded: 7 June 1950
- Opening: 12 May 1951
- Closure: 5 November 1951

Triennial expositions
- Previous: Milan Triennial VIII in Milan
- Next: Milan Triennial X in Milan

The Milan Triennial IX was the Triennial in Milan sanctioned by the Bureau of International Expositions (BIE) on the 7 June 1950. Its theme was Goods - Standard. It was held at the Palazzo dell'Arte and ran from 12 May 1951 to 5 November 1951.

Tapio Wirkkala, Rut Bryk and Dora Jung all won Grand Prix, with Birger Kaipiainen receiving an honorable mention. Toini Muona, Ilmari Tapiovaara and Kaj Franck won gold medals and Lisa Johansson-Pape and Kyllikki Salmenhaara a silver one.
