= Abitare =

Monthly Italian architecture, furniture and design magazine

- Editor-in-chief: Francesca Taroni
- Categories: Design and architecture magazine
- Frequency: Monthly
- Publisher: RCS Mediagroup
- Founded: 1961; 65 years ago
- Company: RCS Group
- Country: Italy
- Based in: Milan
- Language: Italian; English
- Website: Abitare

Abitare (which translates to "live" or "dwell"), published monthly in Milan, Italy, is a design magazine. It was first published in 1961.

== History and profile ==
Abitare was launched in Milan in 1961 by Piera Peroni. It was devoted to architecture, interior design, furniture, product design and graphic arts and was published both in Italian and English.

In 1976, the magazine was sold to Segesta Publishing group. Later it became part of the RCS Group and began to be published by RCS MediaGroup.

Shortly after the founding of the magazine, postwar architect, Eugenio Gentili Tedeschi joined Peroni. In addition to writing for the magazine, he later served as acting de facto editor-in-chief with Franca Santi. Stefano Boeri, Chiara Maranzana, Mario Piazza and Maria Giulia Zunino were among the editors-in-chief of the magazine.

The magazine momentarily ceased print publication in March 2014. However, its online version continued to publish content. The magazine was relaunched in October 2014 with a new format and new graphics under the direction of Silvia Botti.

== See also ==
- List of magazines published in Italy
