= Milan Triennial XII =

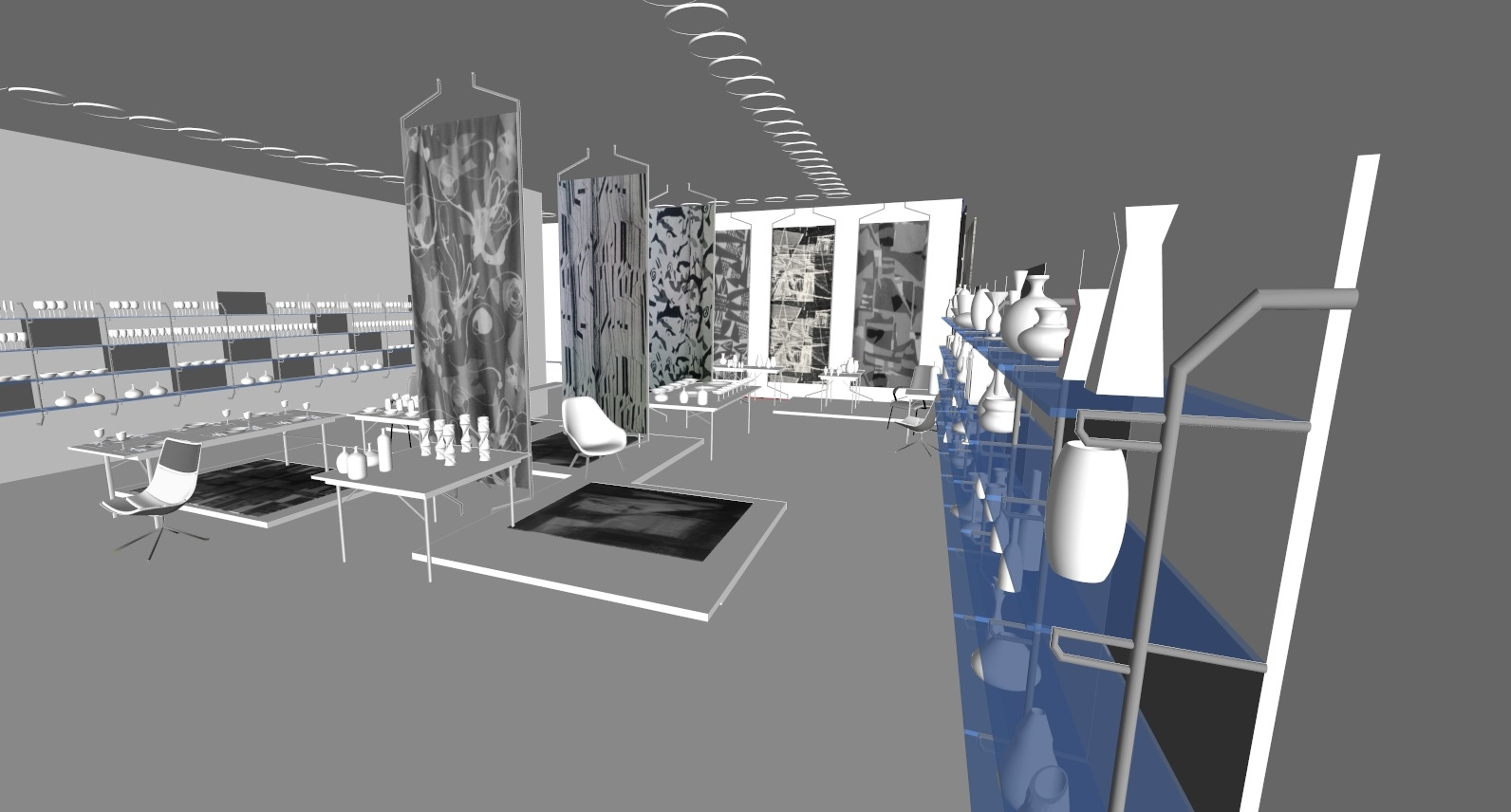
- Plan for the Czechoslovakia pavilion

Overview
- BIE-class: Triennial exposition
- Name: Milan Triennial XII
- Motto: House and School
- Building(s): Palazzo del Arte

Participant(s)
- Countries: 17

Location
- Country: Italy
- City: Milan
- Coordinates: 45°28′19.92″N 9°10′24.78″E

Timeline
- Awarded: 5 May 1959
- Opening: 16 July 1960
- Closure: 4 November 1960

Triennial expositions
- Previous: Milan Triennial XI in Milan
- Next: Milan Triennial XIII in Milan

The Milan Triennial XII was the Triennial in Milan sanctioned by the Bureau of International Expositions (BIE) on the 5 May 1959. Its theme was House and School. It was held at the Palazzo dell'Arte and ran from 16 July 1960 to 4 November 1960.

Antti Nurmesniemi and Birger Kaipiainen both won Grand Prix. Ilmari Tapiovaara and Kyllikki Salmenhaara won gold, and Bertel Gardberg a silver medal.
