= Kyllikki Salmenhaara =

Finnish ceramicist (1915–1981)

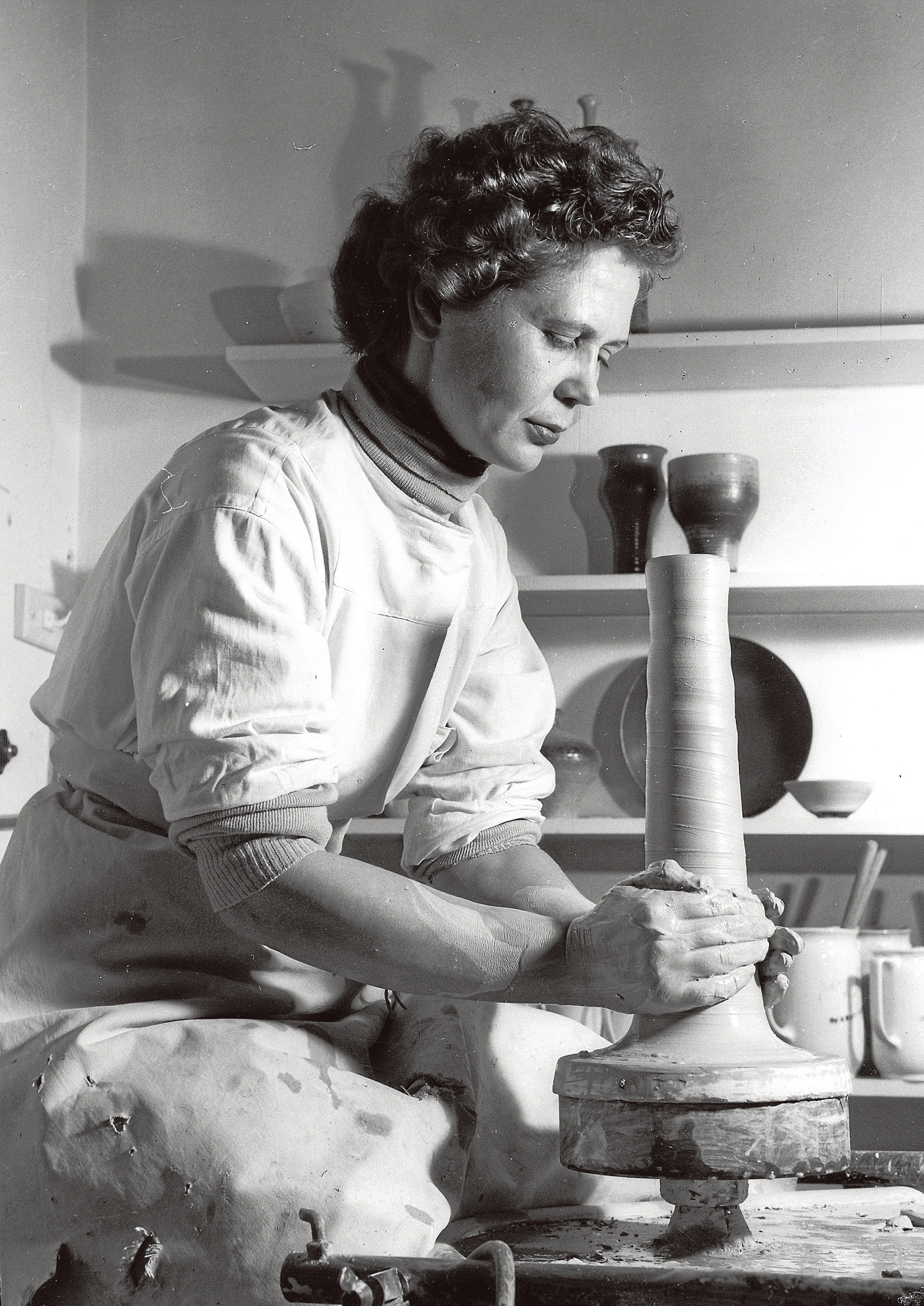
- Salmenhaara in her studio in 1960
- Born: 14 July 1915; Tyrnävä, Finland
- Died: 13 July 1981 (aged 65); Helsinki, Finland
- Known for: Ceramic art and industrial design

Kyllikki Salmenhaara (14 July 1915 – 13 July 1981) was a Finnish ceramicist, and one of the leading ceramic artists and designers of the post-war period internationally.

== Education ==
Salmenhaara finished secondary school in 1937, and went on to study ceramics design at the Central School of Industrial Arts (Taideteollisuuskeskuskoulu, now part of the Aalto University School of Arts, Design and Architecture), graduating in 1943.

In 1946, she travelled to Denmark to continue her studies under Nathalie Krebs. In 1956, she was awarded a scholarship to further her studies at the Alfred University in New York, USA.

== Career ==
=== As designer ===
Salmenhaara was hired straight after her graduation from Taideteollisuuskeskuskoulu by a now-defunct glass manufacturer, Kauklahden lasitehdas. From there she moved in 1947 to the leading Finnish ceramics manufacturer, Arabia, where she remained for nearly 15 years.

Salmenhaara's design philosophy was rooted in pottery as a craft, which she emphasised with down-to-earth shapes, rough, rustic surfaces, and often random, almost 'accidental' glazing and colouring. Among her signature designs are large, shallow bowls, and tall, narrow vases.

=== As teacher ===
Having injured her hand in throwing clay, Salmenhaara had to scale back her design work, and focused in her later career on teaching instead. She held a number of academic positions, teaching ceramic design at her alma mater from 1963 onwards, later heading up the ceramics department, and in 1970 was the first industrial designer to be tenured there as Professor, a position she however had to retire from for health reasons after only three years.

In the early 1960s, she was a senior lecturer and consultant in ceramic industrial design at the Ceramic Trading Institute in Taiwan, and returned to the country as the director of the Taiwanese school of modern ceramics in the early 1970s.

She would have stayed in Taiwan longer, but was persuaded by her fellow designers Kaj Franck and Armi Ratia to return to Finland, for a teaching position at the Finnish National Gallery, Ateneum.

Salmenhaara also held positions as visiting lecturer or professor at several North American universities in the 1960-70s, including at the University of Saskatchewan, University of British Columbia, Sheridan College, Alfred University and Albion College.

She was known as a demanding, but also motivating and encouraging, teacher, who gave her students honest feedback, both positive and negative. She was highly regarded for her comprehensive knowledge of every aspect of ceramics design and craft.

== Awards and honours ==
At the Milan Triennial exhibitions of art and design, Salmenhaara won silver medal in 1951, honourable mention in 1954, the Grand Prix in 1957, and gold in 1960.

In 1961, Salmenhaara was awarded the Pro Finlandia medal of the Order of the Lion of Finland.

Her book Keramiikka (lit. 'Ceramics') (Helsinki: Otava, 1974; ISBN 951-1-01469-2) won the Finnish state award for industrial design in 1975.
