= Ico Parisi =

Italian architect and designer (1916–1996)

Ico Parisi (23 September 1916 – 19 December 1996) was an Italian architect and designer.

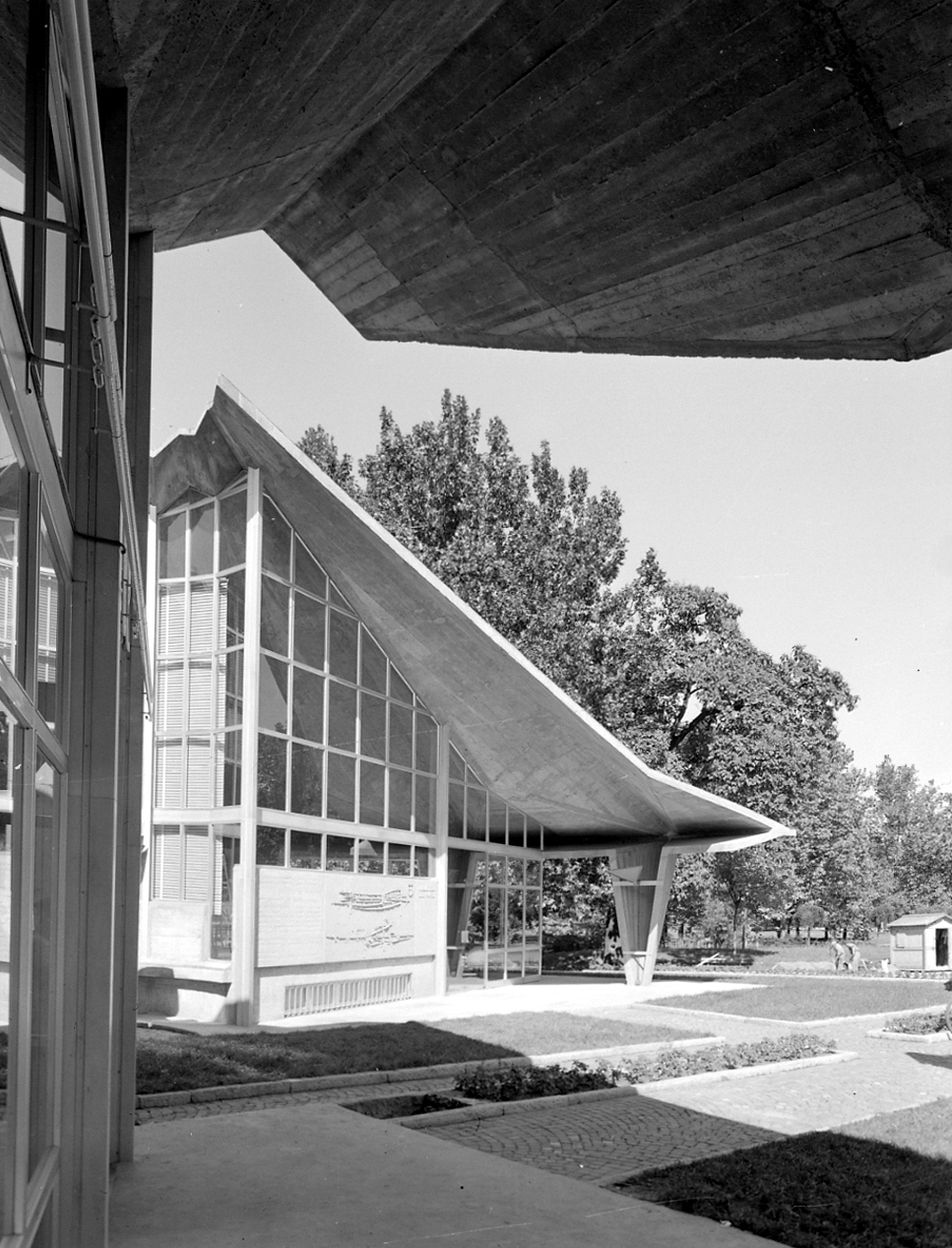
Padiglione Soggiorno in Parco Sempione, for the Milan Triennial X, 1954. Photo by Paolo Monti.

== Life ==
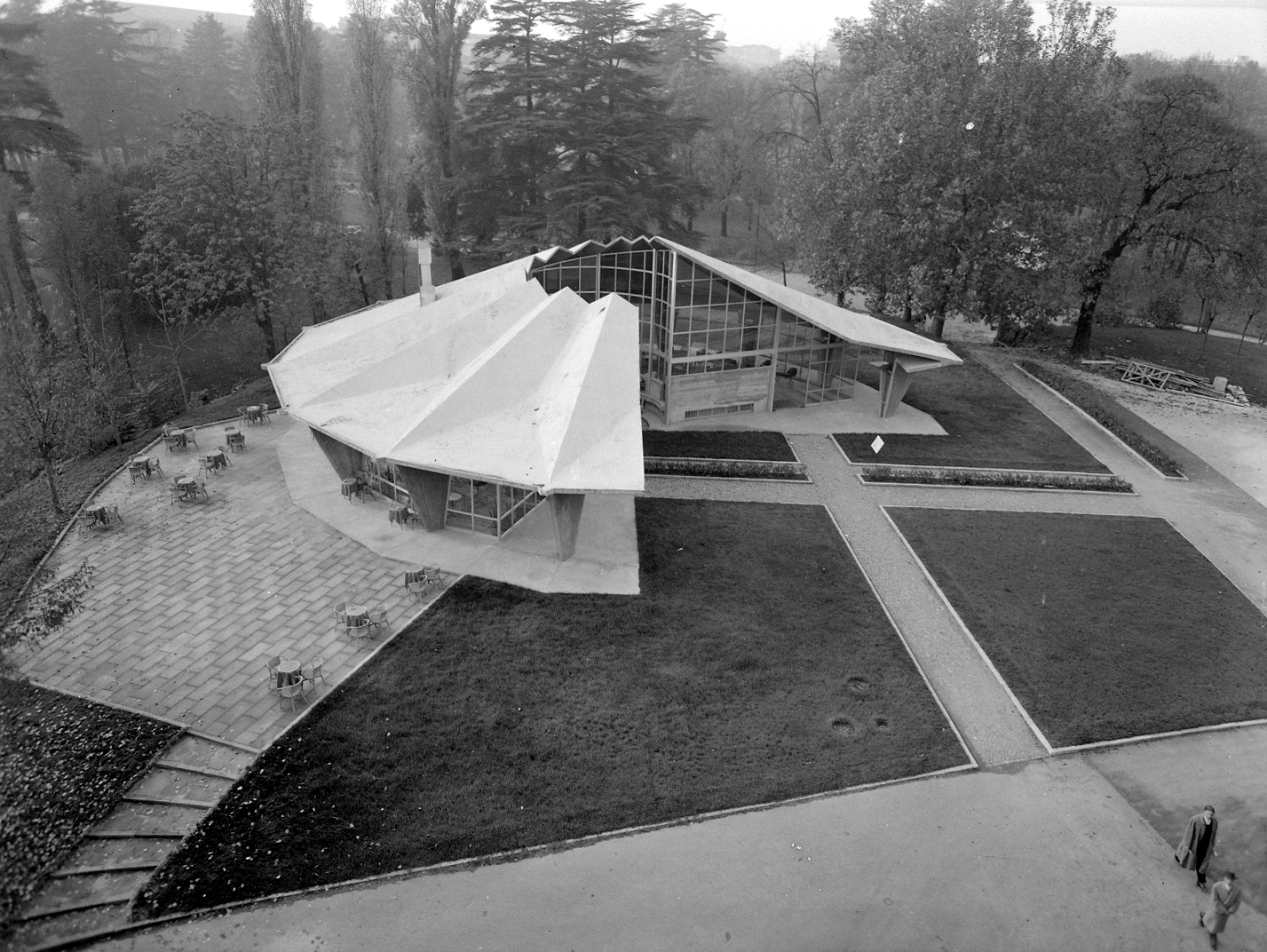
Padiglione Soggiorno, Photo by Paolo Monti, 1954.

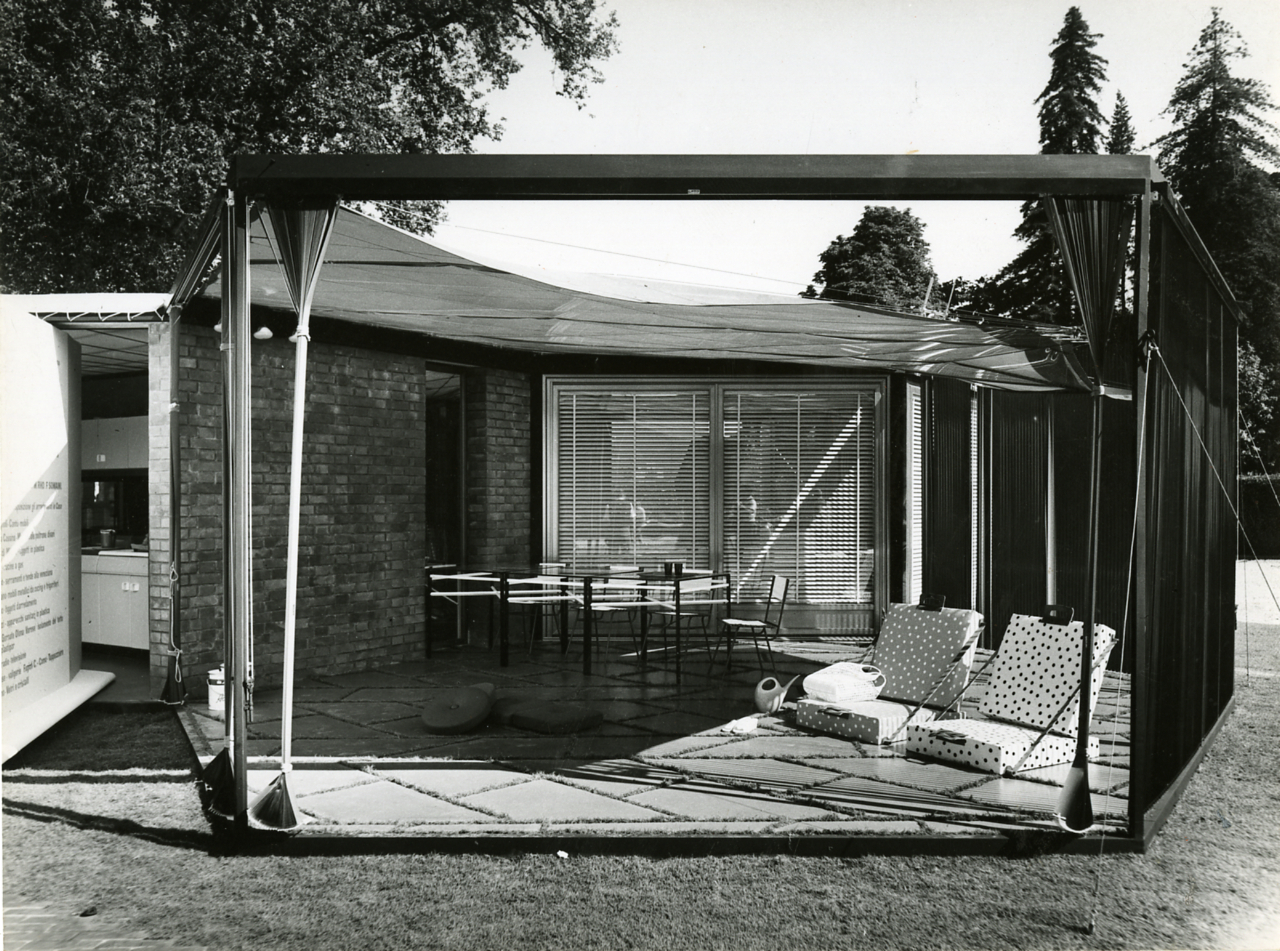
Como, Villa comunale dell'Olmo. Exhibition Colori e forme nella casa di oggi. Casa per le vacanze (with Giampaolo Allevi). Photo by Paolo Monti, 1957.

Ico Parisi was born in Palermo in 1916. He graduated in construction and served his apprenticeship in the studio of Giuseppe Terragni. In 1937 he made a photographic study of the Casa del Fascio for the magazine Quadrante, which marked the whole of Parisi's research into "meditating on the legacies and contradictions of the enormous store of ideas and forms constituted by the experience of the masters".

His activity, marked by continuous experimentation, consists in an incessant research in the fields of architecture, art and design. Between 1948 and 1950 he devoted himself to the study of furniture elements. In the field of design, the crucial encounters with Munari and Fontana (1951), and Melotti profoundly marked his experience. In 1948 he founded, with his wife Luisa Aiani, planner and designer, the studio La ruota which ceased its activity in 1995.

In 1954 he won the Gold Medal at the Milan Triennial X with the work Padiglione soggiorno, with Silvio Longhi and Luigi Antonietti. In 1957 he presented the work Casa per vacanze at the exhibition Colori e forme della casa d'oggi, the result of a collaboration with Manlio Rho, Francesco Somaini and Gian Paolo Allevi. He died in Como in 1996.

== Works ==
Among the projects he took part in:

- Bini's house in Como (1952), with Somaini and Radice
- Parisi's studio and house in Como (1958)
- Condominium of ACI's headquarter in Como (CO) Address: Via Massenzio Masia 79 - Como (CO); planning: 1962 completion: 1963.
- Corte dei Butteri Hotel with the church of Santa Maria dell'Osa in Fonteblanda (1963)
- Building of the Chamber of Commerce in Ferrara (1964)
- Orlandi's house in Erba (1966)
- Fontana's house in Lenno (1967), with Gabriele De Vecchi, Grazia Varisco, Mario Cerioli, Enzo Degni.
- Experience of Contenitori umani (1968), result of a cooperation with Somaini, Parisi's research focuses on the ways of living.
- Projects for the Casa esistenziale (1972), result of a creative partnership with César, Giuliano Collina, Giorgio Bellandi, Chuck Close, Rod Dudley e Duane Hanson
- Operazione Arcevia (1974) in which the integration of arts is marked with the cooperation of Michelangelo Antonioni, Alberto Burri, Aldo Clementi, Tonino Guerra, César and Sanajouand.

== Archive ==
The Ico and Luisa Collection, stored in the Pinacotheca of the city of Como, includes documents and materials related to Parisi's artistic and architectural works from 1940 to 1990: 1.000 technical drawings and paper studies, 2.500 sketches on tracing paper and 38.000 negatives. A collection of 30 ceramic and glass pieces and a painting and architecture specialistic library with 1.000 books is also available.
