= Milan Triennial VII =

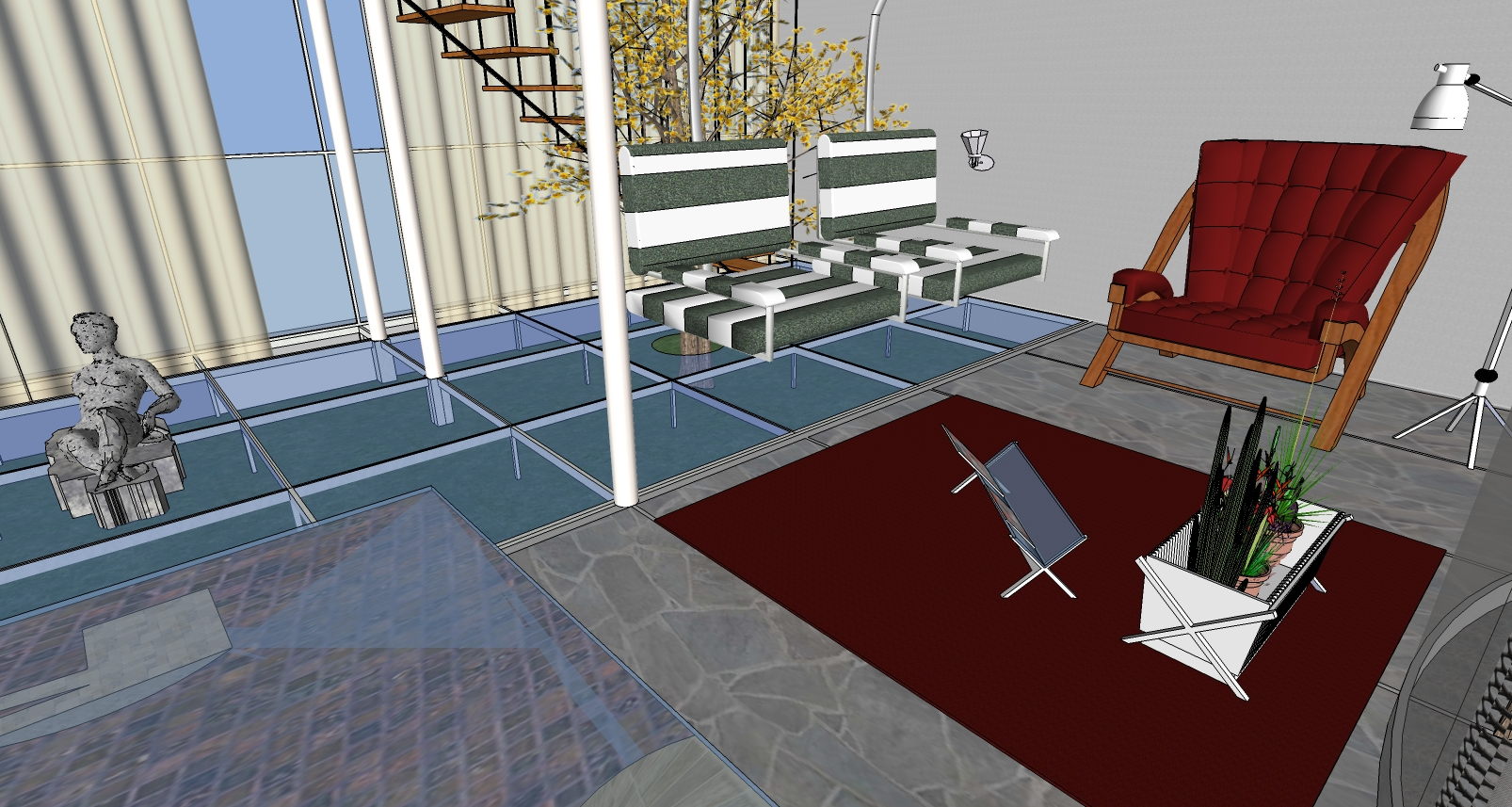

Overview
- BIE-class: Triennial exposition
- Name: Milan Triennial VII
- Motto: Order - Tradition
- Building(s): Palazzo del Arte

Participant(s)
- Countries: 8

Location
- Country: Italy
- City: Milan
- Coordinates: 45°28′19.92″N 9°10′24.78″E

Timeline
- Awarded: 9 November 1938
- Opening: 6 April 1940
- Closure: 9 June 1940

Triennial expositions
- Previous: Milan Triennial VI in Milan
- Next: Milan Triennial VIII in Milan

The Milan Triennial VII was the triennial in Milan sanctioned by the Bureau of International Expositions (BIE) on the 9 November 1938. Its theme was Order - Tradition. It was held at the Palazzo dell'Arte and ran from 6 April 1940 to 9 June 1940, when Italy entered the Second World War. Italy having joined the war at midnight on 11 June 1940.
