= Bagni misteriosi =

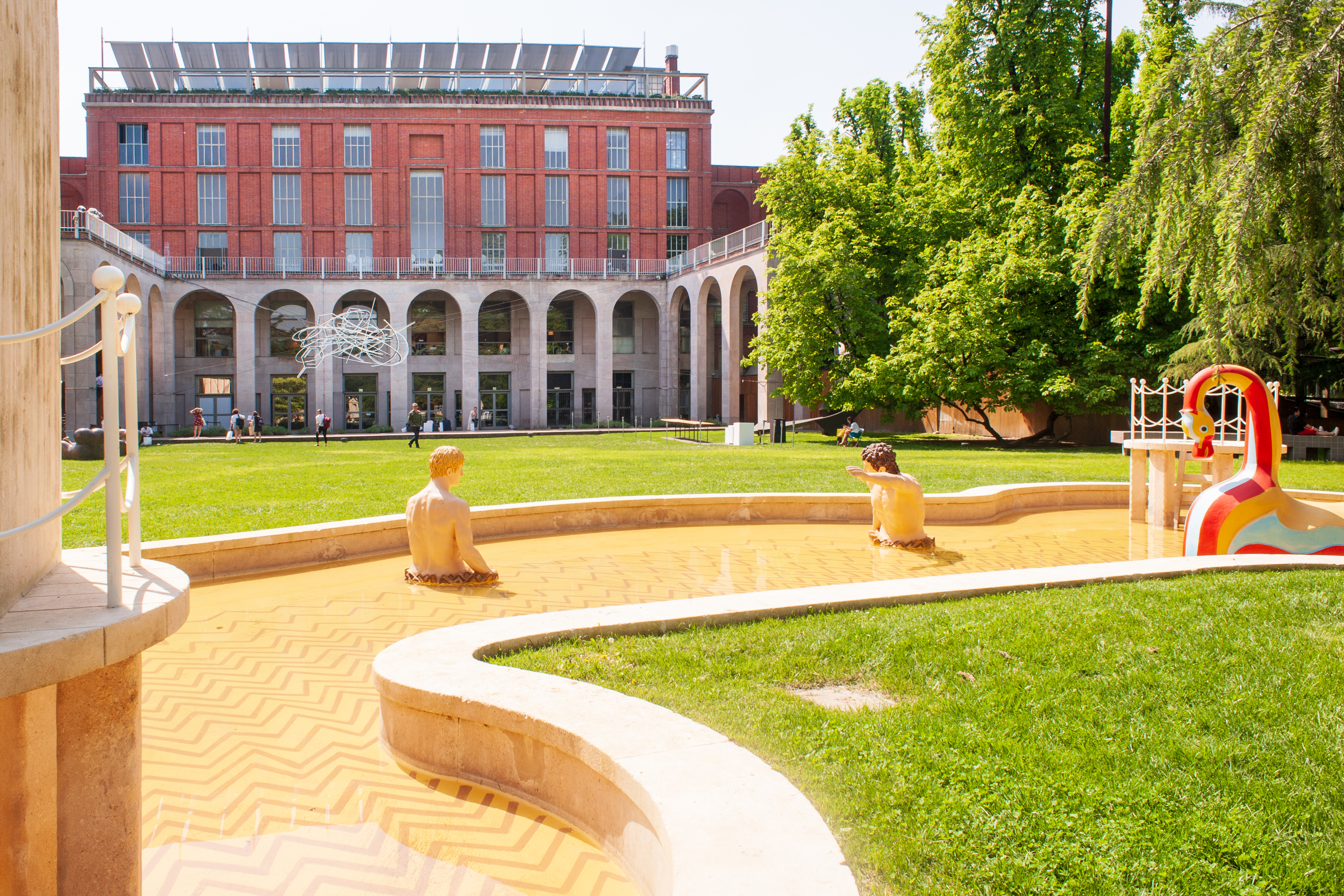
- The fountain and sculpture in 2018
- Artist: Giorgio de Chirico
- Location: Milan, Italy

Bagni misteriosi is a 1973 work by Giorgio de Chirico, installed in Milan's Parco Sempione, in Italy.
