= Milan Triennial VI =

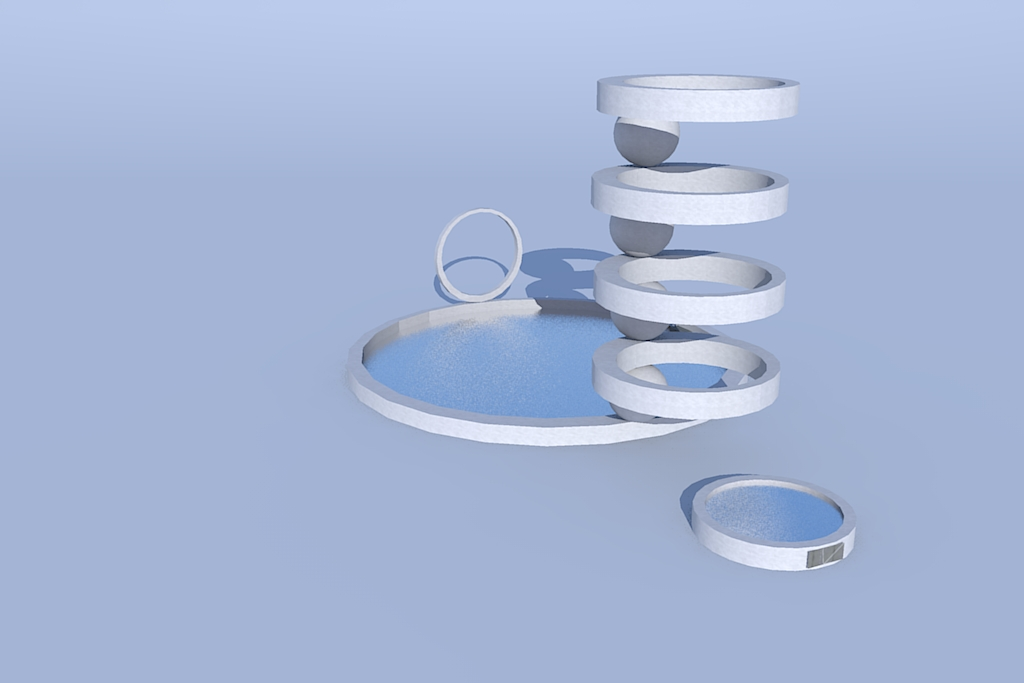
- Fontana di Camerlata original installation at Milan Triennial

Overview
- BIE-class: Triennial exposition
- Name: Milan Triennial VI
- Building(s): Palazzo dell Arte
- Area: Parco Sempione

Participant(s)
- Countries: 11

Location
- Country: Italy
- City: Milan
- Coordinates: 45°28′19.92″N 9°10′24.78″E

Timeline
- Awarded: 22 June 1935
- Opening: 31 May 1936
- Closure: 1 November 1936

Triennial expositions
- Previous: Milan Triennial V in Milan
- Next: Milan Triennial VII in Milan

The Milan Triennial VI was the Triennial in Milan sanctioned by the Bureau of International Expositions (BIE). Its theme was Continuity – Modernity. It was held at the Palazzo dell'Arte with some exhibits on the Parco Sempione and ran from 31 May 1936 - 1 November 1936.

== Contents ==
Buildings included an open air theatre and a concrete and glass Housing Exhibit pavilion designed by Giuseppe Pagano assisted by Costantino Nivola.

Alvar Aalto (for Finland), Georges Braque, Naum Gabo, Goncharova, Larionov, Le Corbusier (for France) Léger and Pablo Picasso all contributed, with Aalto winning both a Gran Prix and a gold medal.
