= Campigli =

Campigli is an Italian surname. Notable people with the surname include:

- Bertha Felix Campigli (1882 – 1949), American photographer
- Massimo Campigli (1895–1971), Italian painter and journalist
- Rocío Campigli (born 1994), Argentine handball player

== See also ==
- Bob Campiglio
