= Lisa Johansson-Pape =

Finnish designer

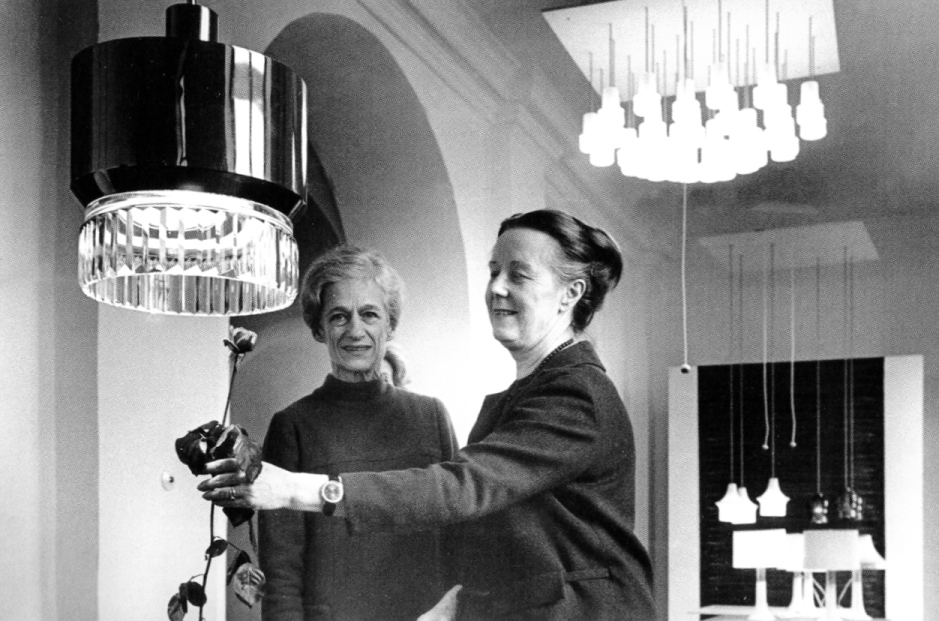
Lisa Johansson-Pape (right) and Dora Jung at their joint exhibition in Stockholm City Museum, 1966.

Carin Lisa Johansson-Pape née Johansson (21 January 1907 – 5 October 1989) was a Finnish designer, best known for her work in lighting. She was the most significant Finnish lighting designer in the second half of the 1900s. Her priorities were first about the functions then the design.

After graduating in 1927 from the Central School of Arts and Crafts she went on to work for Kylmäkoski designing furniture. In 1933 she joined the Friends of Finnish Handicraft. She designed furniture for Stockmann in 1937 and in 1942 she designed for the Stockmann owned lighting factory Orno. Her attention turned towards lighting and she co-founded the Illuminating Engineering Society of Finland and she became the artistic director of the Friends of Finnish Handicraft from 1951–1985.

Johansson-Pape also created installations for 150 churches, including Eckerö Church, Helsinki Children’s Hospital, a rheumatic clinic and for the ships Ilmatar, Aallotar, Finnpartner, Finnhansa and the icebreaker Karhu.

Johansson-Pape also lectured at the School of Industrial Art and wrote articles about lighting. She was also an exhibition architect and organized rug and lighting exhibitions. Her work was presented in New York’s World Fair of 1939 and the Milan Triennial IX, where she won an award in 1951. The hanging lamp made of opal glass that Johansson-Pape designed for Iittala won a gold at the 1954 Milan Triennale. In 1957 Johansson-Pape was awarded the Pro Finlandia prize. In 1963 she designed several vases for Iittala.

A number of Johansson-Pape’s lighting products are still being produced by Innojok.
