= Sironi =

Sironi is a surname. Notable people with the surname include:

- Andrea Sironi (born 1964), Italian academic
- Luca Sironi (born 1974), Italian cyclist
- Maria Bianca Cita Sironi (1924–2024), Italian geologist and paleontologist
- Mario Sironi (1885–1961), Italian Modernist painter
- Martina Sironi (born 1999), known professionally as Cmqmartina, Italian singer-songwriter
