= Hilda Hongell =

Finnish architect

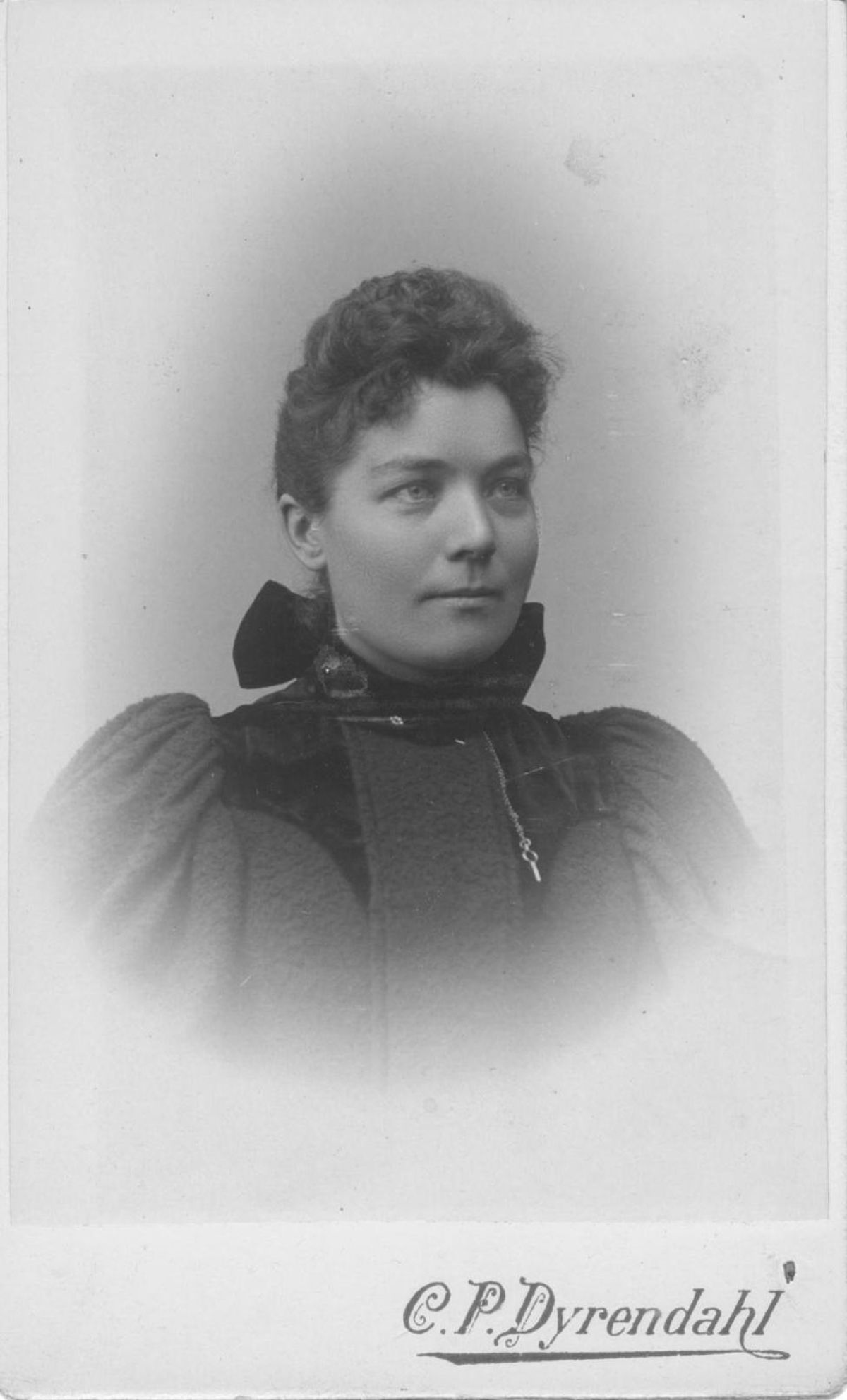
Hilda Hongell

Hilda Hongell (born Hilda Sjöblom; 16 January 1867 in Mariehamn – 10 June 1952) was the first female "master builder" in Finland, and is sometimes described as the first female architect in Finland although Signe Hornborg appears to deserve this title.

== Early years ==
She grew up in the Åland Islands, and began her career as a special student at Helsinki Industrial School in 1891. In those days only men could attend the industrial schools in the country, but because of her excellent results she was accepted as a regular student the following year, and began her career in architecture in 1894.

== Style ==
At the turn of the 20th century, the ornamented Swiss style was favoured in Finland; Hongell used this style most effectively.

== Designs ==
Hilda Hongell designed 98 buildings in the Mariehamn district, mostly town houses and farm houses. Around 44 of them are still standing today.

== Exhibitions ==
An exhibition of the architecture of Hongell, together with her contemporary Lars Sonck, titled "The old architecture of Mariehamn", took place in Helsinki in the summer of 2007.

== Sons ==
Hilda Hongell's son Göran Hongell (1902-1973) was a distinguished glassware designer.

== See also ==
- Women in architecture
