= Parco Sempione =

Urban park in Milan, Italy

Sempione Park
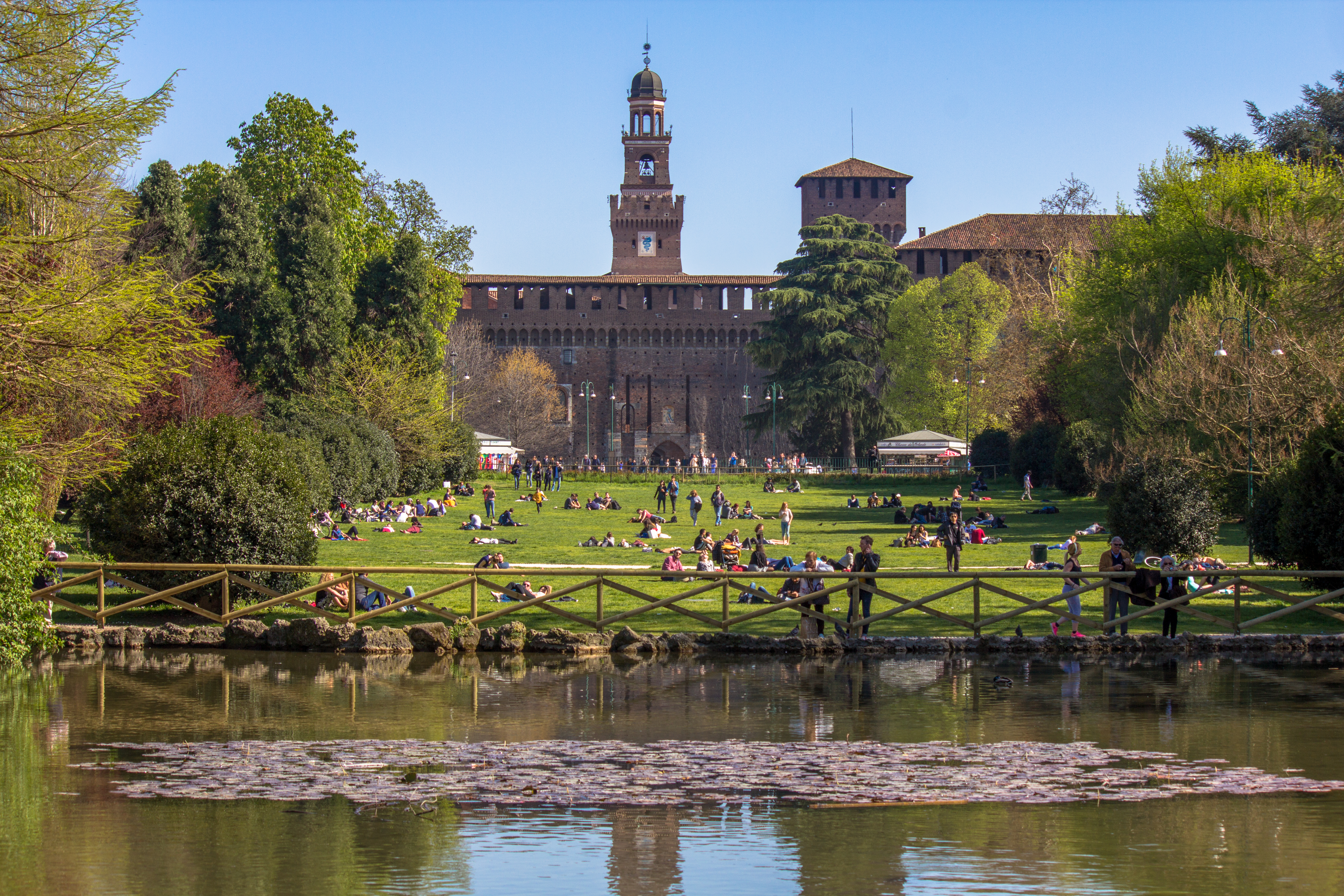
- The lawns of Sempione Park with the Sforza Castle in the background
- Interactive map of Sempione Park
- Type: Historic urban park
- Location: Zone 1
- Designer: Emilio Alemagna
- Operator: City of Milan
- Open: 6:00 am to 12:00 am from April to September, 6:00 am to 10:00 pm from October to March

Sempione Park (Parch Sempion in Milanese dialect, IPA: [ˈpark sempjˈuːŋ]) is a green area in the city of Milan. Built at the end of the 19th century on the area previously occupied by the Piazza d'armi, it covers an area of 386,000 m^{2} (4,150,000 sq ft), completely fenced and under video surveillance.

The name derives from Corso Sempione, the road axis built in the Napoleonic era on the route of the historic Seprio road, with the new Porta Sempione heir to the Porta Giovia.

== History ==
Sempione Park stands where the Visconti ducal park called "Barcho" once was and is located near the Sforza Castle. It was enlarged and fenced by the Sforzas until it became over 3 million square meters (300 hectares) wide. The park was a forest mainly composed of oaks and chestnut trees and also inhabited by exotic animals introduced by man.

With the fall of the Sforzas and the Spanish domination, the park was abandoned and in 1861 a part of it was destined for agriculture. The area where Sempione Park now stands was instead used as a parade ground for the military stationed near the Sforza Castle. The castle was converted into a barracks, with consequent degradation of the structures.

During the Napoleonic era, the architect Giovanni Antonio Antolini designed the construction of a large building complex around the castle, baptized "Foro Buonaparte" in honor of Napoleon; the project was never realized, and in its place the parade ground was transformed into a large lawn for civic uses, adorned on the northeast side by the Arena Civica and on the northwest side by the Arch of Peace, the starting point of the Corso Sempione.

After Italy's Unification, the military use of the area ceased and at the same time a phenomenon of population growth began for the city, requiring the construction of new neighborhoods. A real estate company proposed to subdivide the castle area (whose demolition was planned) and the parade ground, similar to what was done on the area of the lazzaretto, but the proposal caused protests from the citizens, which led to the drafting of the first city general regulatory plan, drawn up by engineer Cesare Beruto, called the Beruto Plan. This plan, which initially partially accepted the building ambitions on the area, was modified several times until the entire parade ground was destined as a public garden. For the castle, restoration and cultural use were planned.

The park, named "Sempione Park", was built between 1888 and 1894 according to the design of architect Emilio Alemagna, which included carriage-accessible avenues, a lake, and a belvedere where the Sempione Park Library now stands. The greenery was designed according to the romantic model of English parks.

=== Subsequent interventions ===
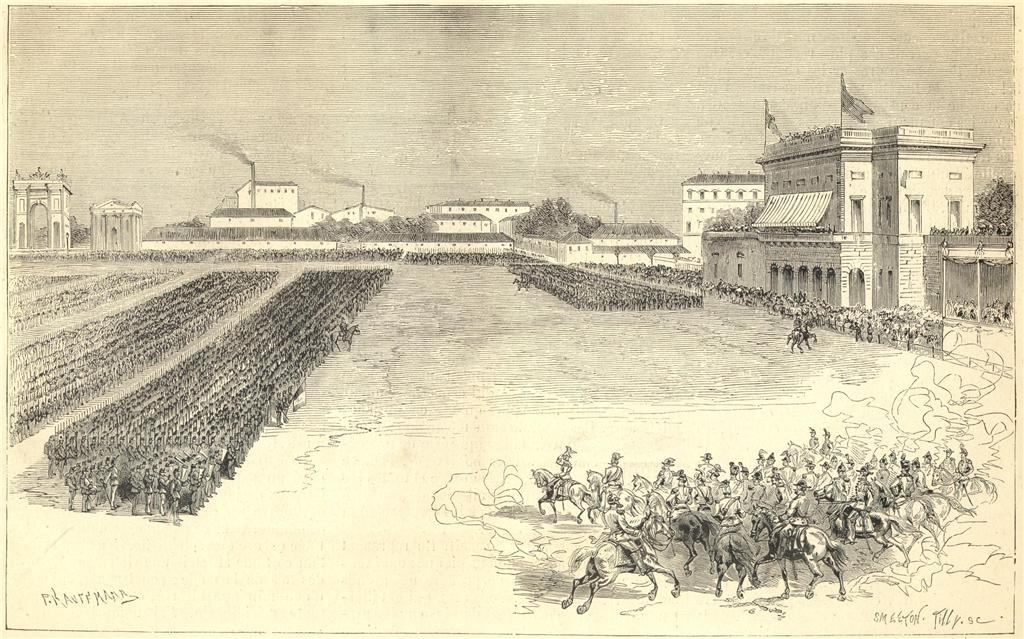
1875: Drawing of the equestrian military carousel, held in the parade ground (before its designation as a park) in honor of Emperor William I of Germany; recognizable on the left in the background is the Arch of Peace and on the right an entrance to the Arena Civica

Since its creation, the park has distinguished itself for its central role in the leisure time of Milanese people and for its close link with art: numerous exhibitions have been held in the park, including the 1894 Milan International Exhibition, the Milan International Exhibition of 1906, and the triennial exhibitions starting from 1933 with the construction of the Palazzo dell'Arte by Giovanni Muzio, today home to the Triennale di Milano.

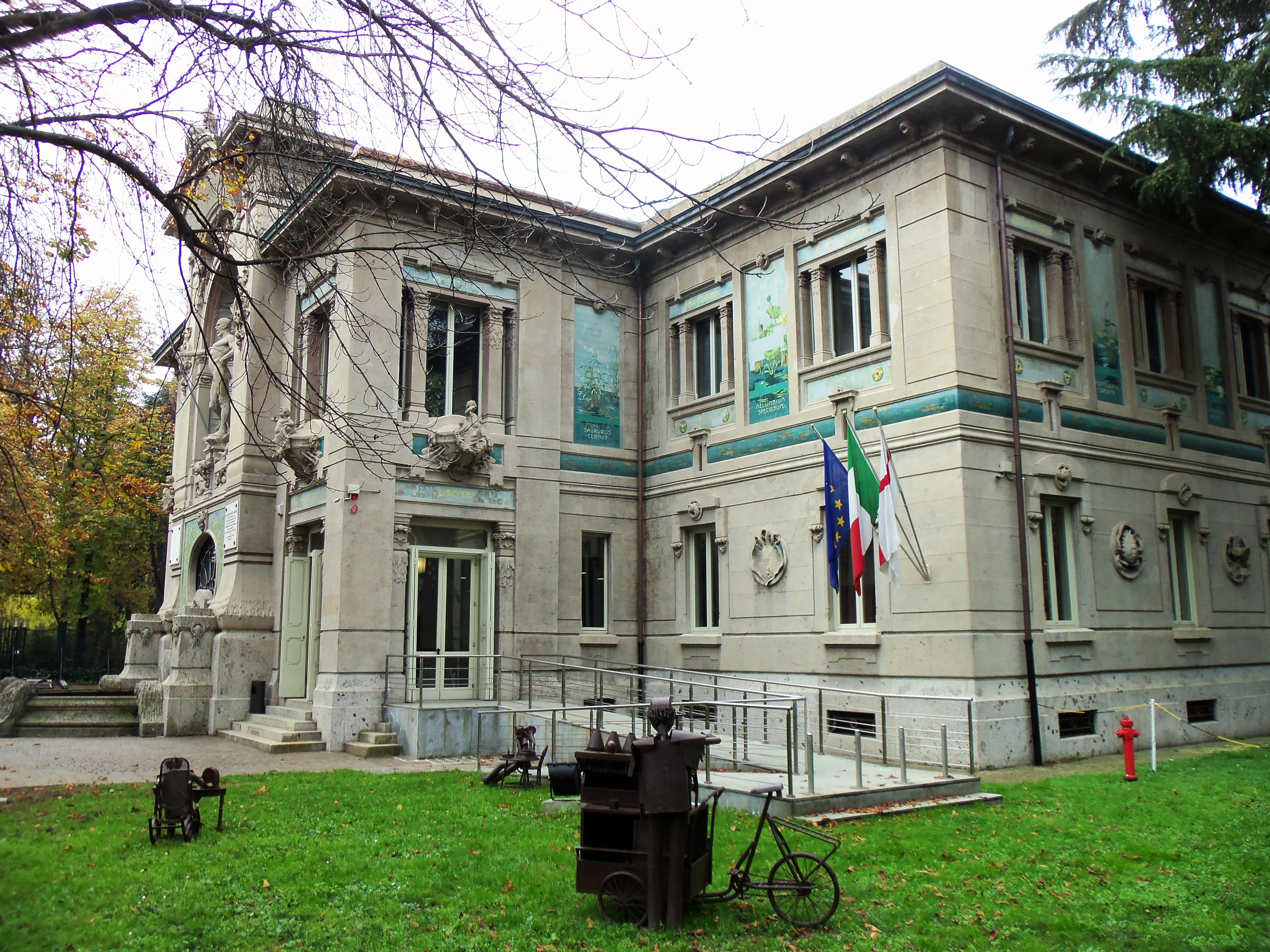
The aquarium, built for the International Exhibition of 1906

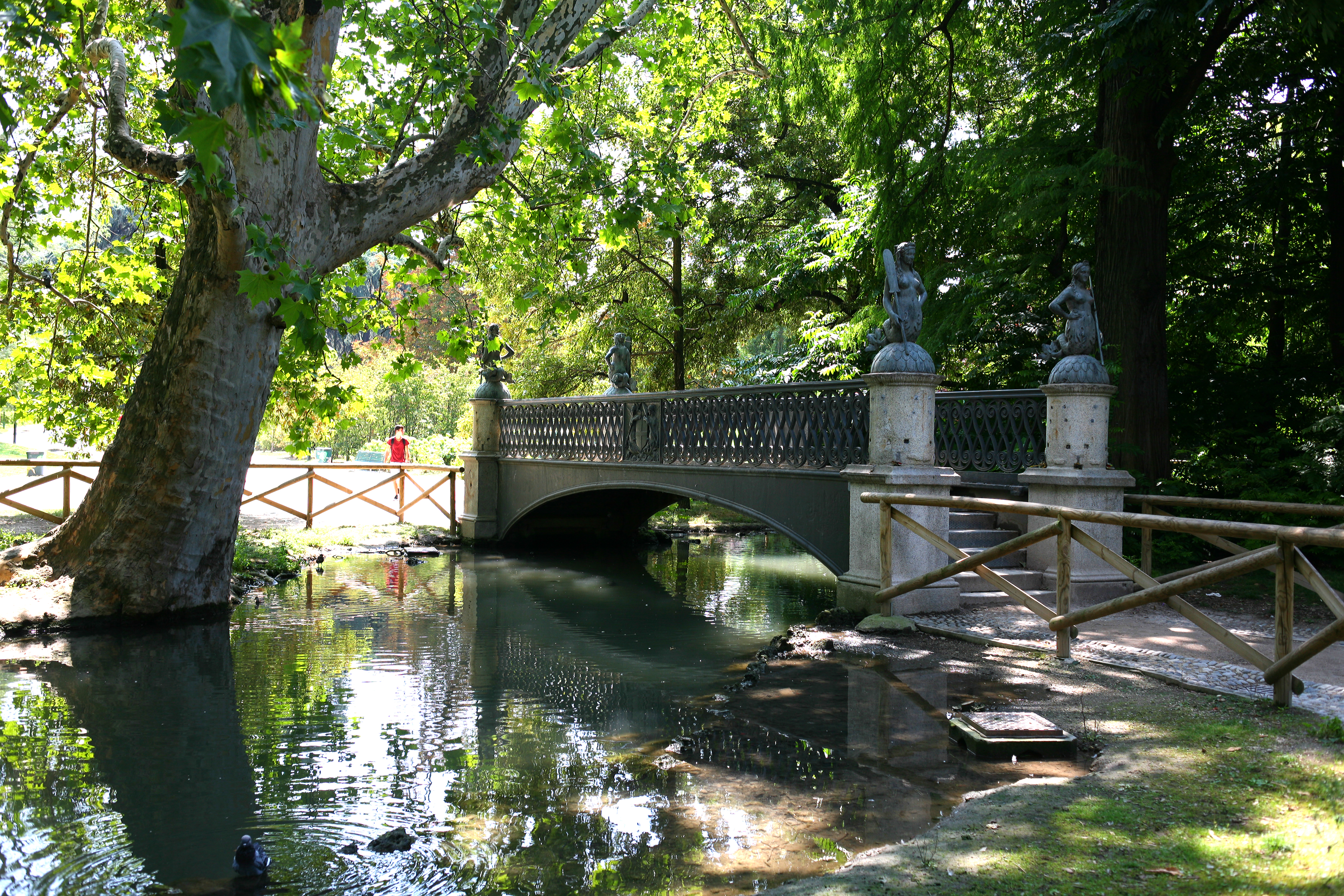
Little Mermaids Bridge

Among the significant buildings in the park, in addition to the Palazzo dell'Arte, stand out the Arena Civica, the pavilion of the Milan Civic Aquarium by Locati, and the Littoria Tower (now Torre Branca) built in 1932–33 on the design of Gio Ponti, Cesare Chiodi, and Ettore Ferrari. Also noteworthy is the former pavilion for the X Triennale, now the Sempione Park Library, built by Longhi and Parisi.

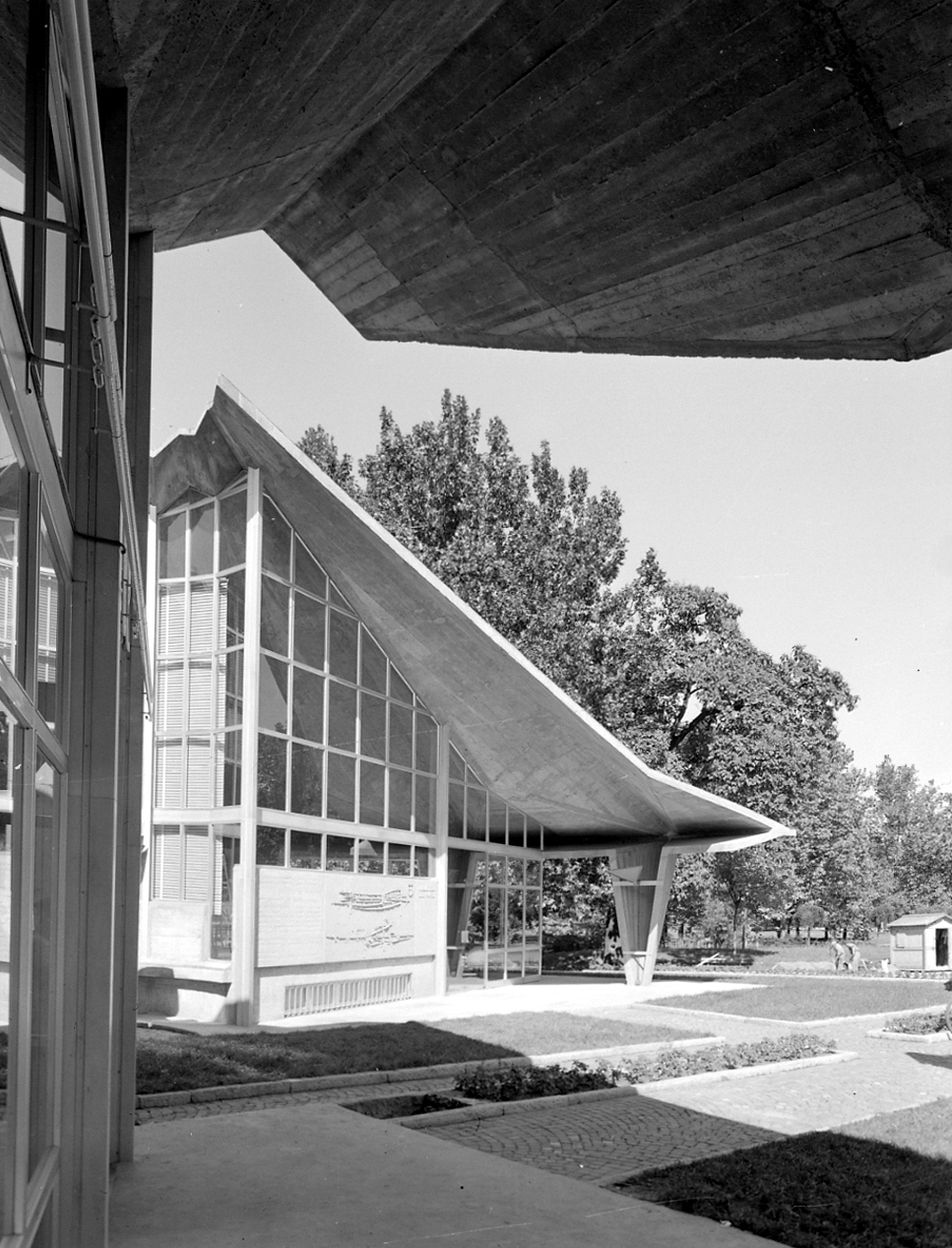
The Sempione Park Library in a 1963 photo by Paolo Monti.

Several sculptures, including the Napoleon III Monument of Milan by sculptor Francesco Barzaghi and the works Storia della Terra by Antonio Paradiso, Accumulazione musicale by Armand Pierre Fernandez, and the Mysterious Baths by Giorgio de Chirico. Finally, the Ponte delle Sirenette by Francesco Tettamanzi, once on the naviglio in Via San Damiano (now Visconti di Modrone) and spared on the occasion of the covering of the Cerchia dei Navigli in 1930.

The park also hosts, near the Arena, a fountain of oligomineral water called Fontana dell'acqua marcia for the sulfurous smell that characterizes it. The fountain was built between 1925 and 1928 by the municipal technical office (engineer Amorosi), which at that time was carrying out drilling to enrich the city's aqueduct flow, and is still active and frequented, although it has been classified "non-potable" because precisely for the oligomineral characteristic it was not considered appropriate to introduce it into the general drinking water pipeline of the city.

In 1954, on the occasion of the Milan Triennial X, two pavilions were erected inside the park, converted at the end of the event into a library, the Biblioteca al Parco, and the "Bar Bianco".

From 1954 to 1969 the architect Vittoriano Viganò developed a park redesign project, which in the author's intentions should have been expanded to include Piazza Castello and the first stretch of Corso Sempione, burying all carriage roads. Of this project, only the pedestrianization of the area around the Arch of Peace and the first stretch of Corso Sempione was realized.

In 1996 the municipal administration decided to undertake an overall restoration of the park, the castle, and Piazza Sempione, where the Arch of Peace is located. The restoration included a new park fence, the remaking of roads, and a botanical and plant restoration of the park's flora.

In recent years, the space between the Sforza Castle and Sempione Park (Piazza del Cannone) has become the site of continuous setups of various kinds. For carnival it hosts an amusement park which, in some way, represents continuity with the old Fiera di Porta Genova, which for years gathered rides and attractions along the banks of the Darsena river. In January 2011, the park was the unusual setting for a stage of the Cross-Country Skiing World Cup, the last sprint event on the calendar (individual and men's and women's relay), with one hundred and forty athletes participating.

The park is dedicated to the homonymous song written by the group Elio e le Storie Tese and released as a single in 2008, although much of the song refers to events related to Bosco di Gioia.

In 2014 the City of Milan pedestrianized the Piazza Castello area, modifying the cycle-pedestrian paths. This allowed the publication of a tender for the redevelopment of the area, with certain annexation to the Sempione Park context.

On May 23, 2015, a copy of Alberto Burri's "Teatro Continuo" was inaugurated in the center of the park, built for the 1973 Triennale and demolished in 1989 due to its degradation. Placed on the central axis of the park, which ideally connects the center of Milan with Sempione, it consists of a scenic structure reduced to the essential, always ready for use, a free venue, both for artistic activities and performances, and for independent use by anyone. Composed of a platform raised from the ground and six rotating side wings, it was created in 1973 for the XV Triennale and today, together with the Mysterious Baths by Giorgio De Chirico and the Musical Accumulation and Seat by Arman, made on the same occasion, forms an integral part of Sempione Park.

== Flora and facilities ==
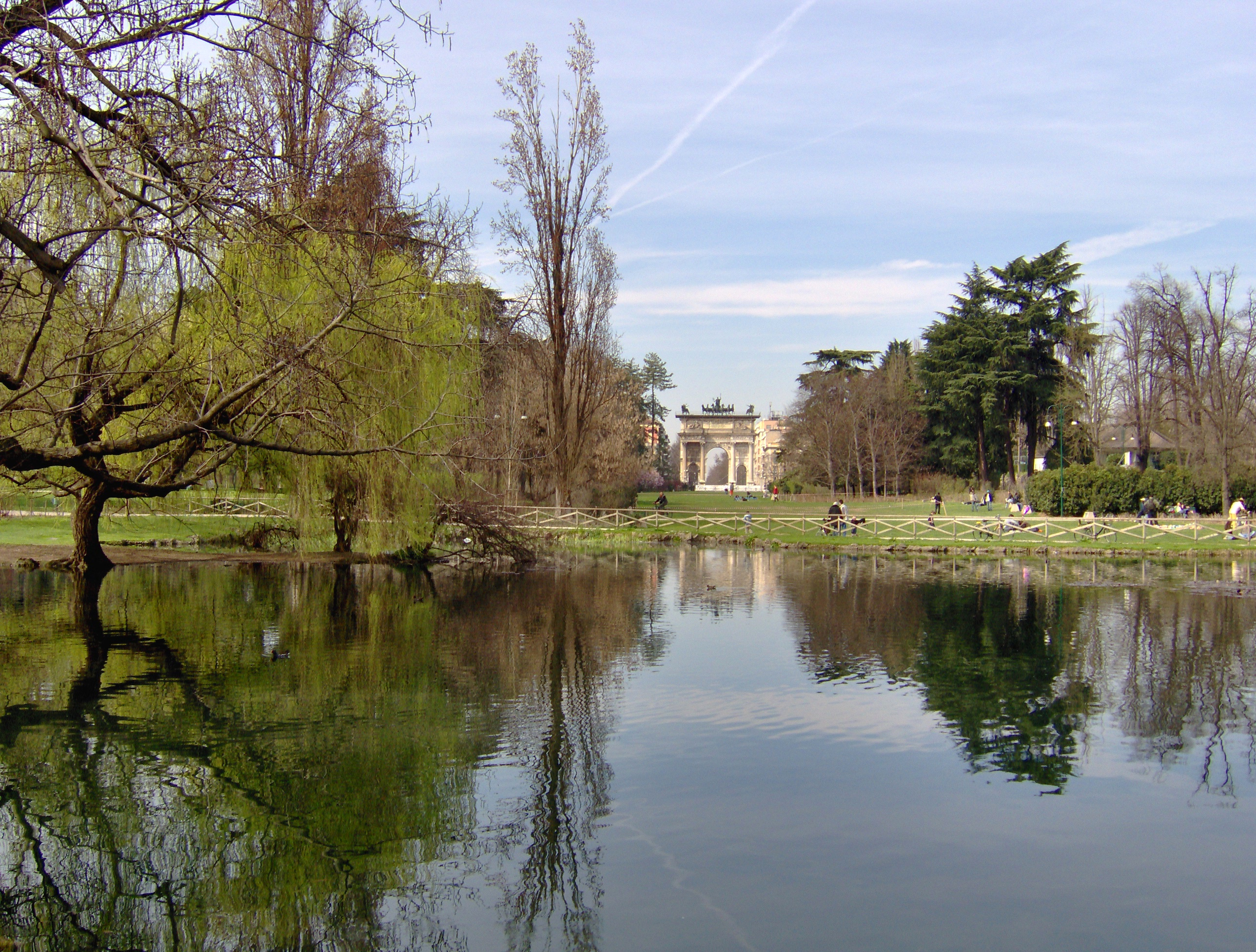
The lake, towards the Arch of Peace

The flora of Sempione Park is very rich and varied and the voluntary ecological guards have organized two botanical paths with the recognition of fifty species for school groups, who are also given a small illustrated guide for free.

On the belvedere, in front of the statue of Napoleon III, there is an old monumental elm and a large horse chestnut grows near the "Little Mermaids Bridge". Among the other noteworthy trees a curious American plane tree on the bank of the lake's extension, two large Caucasian walnuts that reflect in the water mirror and weeping beeches near the Triennale garden. Several varieties of cedar: the Atlas, the Himalayan, and the Californian, then beautiful groups of red oaks, yews, bald cypresses, and lindens. Many varieties of maples: silver, box elder, field, mountain, and Norway. Still among the tall trees, we recall pines, beeches, poplars, horse chestnuts, holm oaks, and magnolias and, finally, the black alder, the black walnut, the ginkgo, and the sweetgum.

The redevelopment and restoration of the park between 1999 and 2003 enriched the presence of shrubby vegetation and its decorative functions; among other things, some species with winter or early flowering were also inserted such as Sarcococca confusa, witch hazel, loropetalum, winter sweet, and some varieties of mahonia and camellia. Among the spring and summer species, we recall the wide range of cornelian cherries, viburnums, hydrangeas, camellias, rhododendrons, azaleas, and old roses.

In the park enclosure there are eight equipped fitness trails, a basketball court (accompanied, until 1998, by a volleyball court) in addition to a single large play area for children. Four fenced spaces reserved for dogs.

== Monuments and sculptures ==
The park has accumulated a set of public art-works. Most were retained after their display in a recent Triennale exhibition:

- Teatro Continuo (1973): a prominent sculpture by Alberto Burri, dismantled in 1989, but restored and repositioned in its original location for Expo 2015.
- Accumulazione Musicale e Seduta (or amphitheater) (1972): architectural monument designed by Arman
- Equestrian Monument to Napoleone III: bronze statue by the sculptor Francesco Barzaghi, completed by 1881, but deemed controversial and not installed until 1927
- I Bagni Misteriosi (Mysterious Baths) (1973): Multicolor whimsical fountain with sculptures designed by Giorgio de Chirico
- Ponte delle Sirenette (Little Mermaids Bridge): Pedestrian bridge designed by Francesco Tettamanzi and inaugurated in 1842 to span a canal (naviglio) located where now runs via Uberto Visconti di Modrone, and moved to the park in 1930.
- Chiosco Scultura (1973): abstract sculptural monument by Giorgio Amelio Roccamonte
- Feroce Equilibrio (Fierce Equilibrium) (1973): Steel abstract sculpture by Carlo Mo
- Public Library (1954): Display pavilion building from the X Triennial, converted to library.

== Popular legends ==
Among the Milanese legends, the ghost of the so-called Black Lady is noted: on foggy evenings, when Sempione Park is now deserted, one might smell violets and the spectral figure of the lady dressed in a long black dress and veiled in the face would appear. The woman, once a few centimeters from the passerby, offers her icy hand: those who take it are dragged into hidden paths of the park, into increasingly thick fog, until reaching a large villa. Inside this villa the Lady gives herself to the passerby, only after the man finds the courage to lift the veil, thus discovering a skull with empty orbits. The terrible discovery makes all men flee from the Lady in black, who never tries to hold them back, knowing that they would always return to look for her. According to the famous legend, all men victim of the Lady lose their minds and experience such strong love that it leads them to madness, spending their lives trying to find the large villa where they had danced with the dark Lady.

Other legends tell the story of processions of desperate souls, recognized as ghosts of the Cathars, burned alive in Corso Monforte because considered heretics. There are also legends of women burned alive considered witches and of the Phantom of the Opera who haunts the La Scala theater, focusing on anyone who goes to attend performances without understanding opera music.

== See also ==
- Sforza Castle
- Arena Civica
- Triennale di Milano
- Torre Branca
- Arch of Peace

== Bibliography ==
- Maurizio Grandi, Attilio Pracchi (1980). Milano. Guida all'architettura moderna [Milan. Guide to modern architecture] (in Italian). Bologna: Zanichelli. ISBN 88-08-05210-9.
- Elisabetta Lama (February 1980). "L'architetto Emilio Alemagna e le vicende del Parco Sempione di Milano" [The architect Emilio Alemagna and the events of Milan's Sempione Park]. Casabella (in Italian). XLIV (455). Milan: Electa: 54–59.
- Lanzani Abbà, Alma; Pia Meda (June 1985). Alberi a Milano [Trees in Milan] (in Italian). photographs by Gabriele Lanzani et al; illustrations by Silvia Rovati. Milan: CLESAV - Cooperativa Libraria Editrice per le Scienze Agrarie, Alimentari e Veterinarie. ISBN 88-7064-100-7.
- Guido Aghina (1997). Enciclopedia di Milano [Encyclopedia of Milan] (in Italian). Milan: Franco Maria Ricci Editore. ISBN 88-216-0933-2.
- Giuseppe de Finetti, Milano. Costruzione di una città [Building a city] (in Italian) (edited by Giovanni Cislaghi, Mara De Benedetti, Piergiorgio Marabelli), Hoepli, Milan 2002. ISBN 88-203-3092-X
- Graziella Leyla Ciagà, Graziella Tonon (edited by), Le case nella Triennale. Dal Parco al QT8 [Houses in the Triennale. From the Park to QT8] (in Italian), Electa, Milan 2005. ISBN 88-370-3802-X
