= Göran Hongell =

Finnish designer

Hans Göran Andreas Hongell (6 September 1902 in Helsinki – 27 July 1973 in Helsinki), son of Hilda Hongell (the first female "master builder" in Finland) was a Finnish designer, best known for his work with glass.

== Career ==
After studying decorative painting, Göran Hongell and a fellow student, Gunnar Forsström, established a decorative painting studio that designed posters and painted decorations for public areas. In 1932 Hongell was hired as a designer by Karhula-Iittala. His position became permanent in 1940. Hongell was the first designer to be hired by a Finnish glassworks.

His main work at Karhula-Iittala consisted of taking existing models and readying them for serial production by streamlining, changing the ground pattern and re-sizing the objects. In 1941 Hongell designed his most famous glass art, Hongellin hattu. Other works of art such as the stackable glassware sets Silko, Säde and Maininki, which were designed in 1936 and 1937, are examples of Hongell’s modern style. Hongell also designed basic bowls and vases which could be engraved according to the customers wishes. One of the disciplines at the Stockholm design competition in 1946 was to design engravings for vases designed by Hongell himself.

Hongell facilitated collaboration between designers and glassblowers by taking drawings and asking the glassblowers about the technical aspects. The Karhula glassworks developed special techniques and hues for his work.

In 1949 Hongell created Aarne, the first single-stage stemware glasses. The glasses are streamlined with the foot being formed at the same time as the glass. Hongell’s Aarne went on to win gold at the Milan Triennale in 1954 and became Hongell’s best known glassware. Productions of the glasses lasted till 1969 and were restarted at the Iittala glassworks in 1981.
