= Milan Triennial VIII =

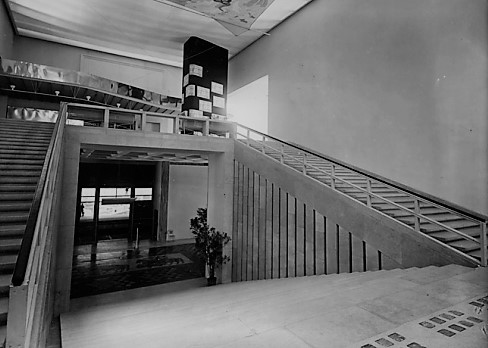
- Grand staircase designed by Gualtiero Galmanini

Overview
- BIE-class: Triennial exposition
- Name: Milan Triennial VIII
- Motto: The House
- Building(s): Palazzo del Arte

Participant(s)
- Countries: 7

Location
- Country: Italy
- City: Milan
- Coordinates: 45°28′19.92″N 9°10′24.78″E

Timeline
- Awarded: 11 June 1946
- Opening: 31 May 1947
- Closure: 14 September 1947

Triennial expositions
- Previous: Milan Triennial VII in Milan
- Next: Milan Triennial IX in Milan

The Milan Triennial VIII was the Triennial in Milan sanctioned by the Bureau of International Expositions (BIE) on the 11 June 1946. Its theme was The House. It was held at the Palazzo dell'Arte and ran from 31 May 1947 to 14 September 1947.
