= Dora Jung =

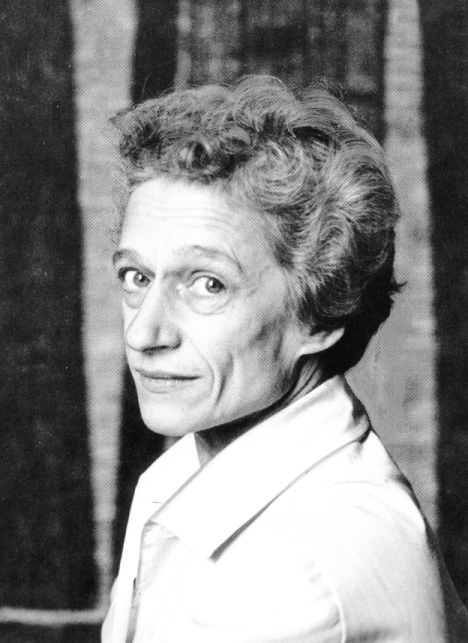
- Dora Jung in 1956
- Born: 16 October 1906; Helsinki
- Died: 20 December 1980; Helsinki
- Resting place: Hietaniemi cemetery
- Education: Aalto University School of Arts, Design and Architecture
- Occupations: Textile artist, designer
- Awards: Honorary Royal Designer for Industry (1979); Commander of the Order of the Lion of Finland (1979)

Dora Elisabet Jung HonRDI FRSA (16 October 1906 – 19 December 1980) was textile artist, craftswoman, and industrial designer from Finland. Her career lasted five decades. She designed products and works of art made out of linen which can be found in homes, churches, and public buildings. She was known for her expertise in designing woven damask fabrics with abstract motifs.

Jung graduated in school of Art and design in 1932. She founded her own weaving atelier where she worked for more than 50 years. She developed her own loom, but usually others did the weaving while Jung concentrated in design and improving the weaving technique. Jung was considered by her contemporaries as the reformer of damask and her weaving as the renaissance of the damask art. Her method of damask weaving has been called the Dora Jung technique.

In 1951 she was awarded a Grand Prix at the Milan Textile Triennial Exposition for her damask called Duvor (Doves). After that she got many contracts for public buildings. Architects and representatives of the Finnish Lutheran church appreciated her work for all of her career. She designed for the textile factory Tampella from 1936 to 1972. In 1957 she got the task of re-designing the damask production of Tampella. She designed several tablecloths with matching napkins and small clothes. Most of them were in white or light pastel colours, but in 1960s and 1970s even brighter colours were used. Currently Finnish weaving company Lapuan Kankurit sells some of Jung's designs.

== Awards ==
- 1933 Bronze medal from the Triennale de Milano Esposizione
- 1951 Grand Prix at the Milan Triennales, for her Kyyhkysiä’ (Doves) tapestry
- 1954 Grand Prix at the Milan Triennales
- 1955 Pro Finlandia Award
- 1957 Grand Prix at the Milan Triennales, for her Viivaleikki (Play of Lines) tablecloth design
- 1958 Ford Leader Grant
- 1961 Prince Eugen medal from Sweden
- 1963 Cotil award from Denmark
- 1972 Scandinavian Arts and Crafts Award, Handelsbank Fond, Copenhagen, Denmark
- 1979 Honorary Royal Designer for Industry, 1979 (The Royal Society for the Encouragement of Arts, Manufactures and Commerce, RSA)
- 1980 Commander of the Order of the Lion of Finland "for promoting industrial design in Finland"
