= Heljä Liukko-Sundström =

Finnish ceramic artist (1938 – 2024)

Heljä Tuulia Mirjam Liukko-Sundström Professor
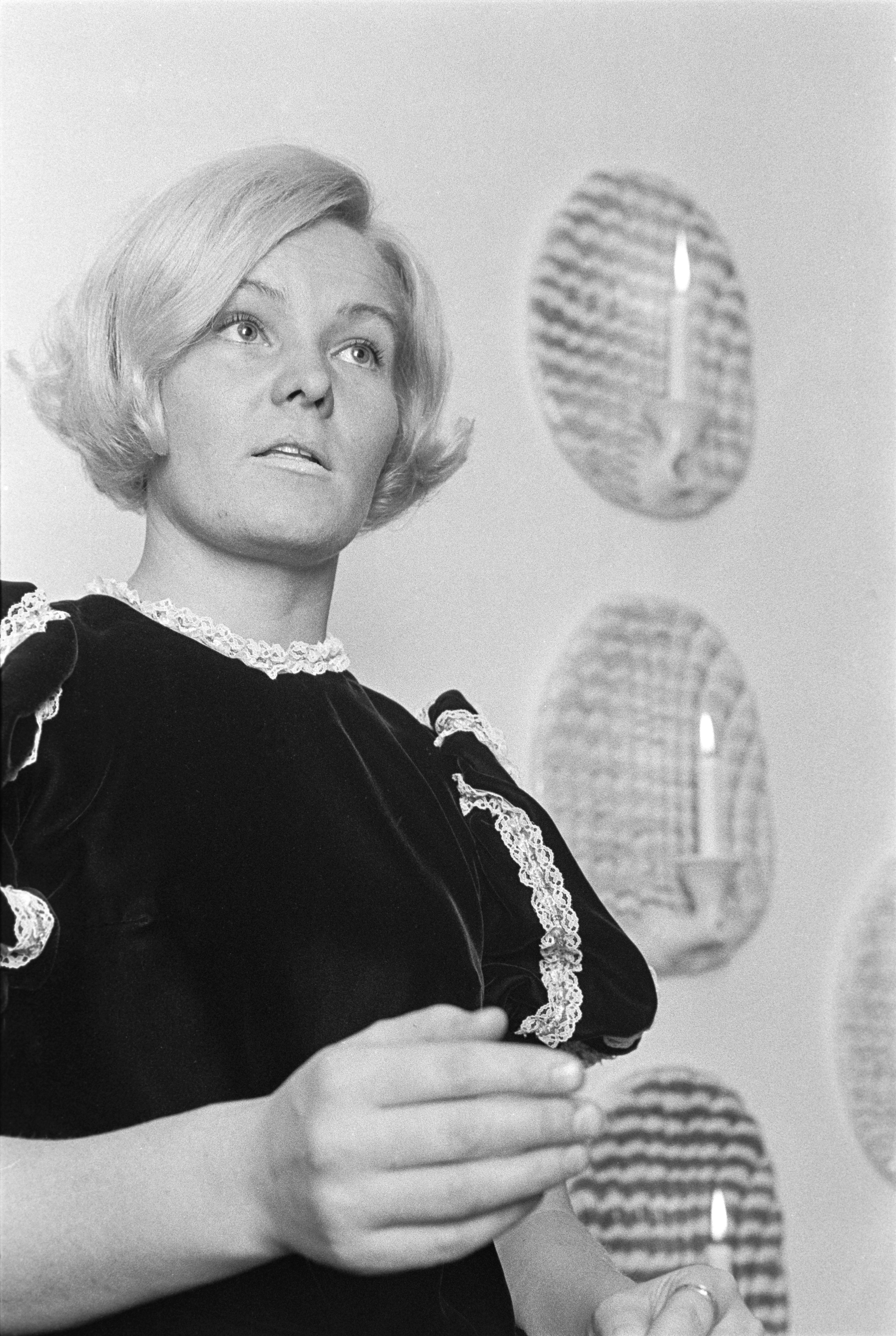
- Pictured 1969
- Born: 15 June 1938; Vehmaa, Finland
- Died: 21 May 2024 (aged 85); Helsinki
- Education: Aalto University School of Arts, Design and Architecture
- Known for: Tuuli tableware in recognition of Arabia's 110th anniversary in 1983 and children's literature
- Spouse: Kauko Sundström
- Awards: Honorary professor's title in 1994
- Website: http://www.helja.fi/

Heljä Tuulia Mirjam Liukko-Sundström (June 15, 1938 – May 21, 2024) was a prolific Finnish ceramicist, potter, artist and children's writer. She was recognized as one of Finland's leading ceramic artists of the 20th century. Her work was noted for highlighting playfulness and joy, with many designs featuring rabbits and flowers. Liukko-Sundström's work is considered a hallmark of Scandinavian design. She was recognized for her work with the Arabia company, where she worked for more than 40 years.

== Biography ==
Liukko-Sundström grew up in Mynämäki in southwest Finland, near Turku, where she was said to be "timid, serious and quiet". She was fascinated by animals and the forests and meadows of her childhood. Her mother was a teacher and her father was an agriculture scientist. She had a twin brother and two younger sisters, who would also become artists. Her proficiency for art was noticed at an early age. Her Finnish teacher predicted she would become a writer, and her art teacher, Olavi Lanu, believed she would become a visual artist.

At age 17 she met Kauko Sundström, who would become her partner and husband, in a relationship that would last over sixty years until his death.

=== Arabia ===
The Arabia Campus Library, today housed in the former ceramics factory

In 1962 she graduated from art school at the Ateneum's Academy of Fine Arts, Helsinki (today the Aalto University School of Arts, Design and Architecture). Later that year she became an artist and product developer at Arabia, where she would go on to work until the factory closed in 2016.

At Arabia, she worked alongside noted designers Birger Kaipiainen, Toini Muona and Rut Bryk where she continued to develop as an artist, calling the experience "my university".

She was known for her experimentation and creativity with clay, in using cast off clay and waste cuttings from other works when designing clay tiles or mural pieces. At Arabia she developed a unique style that showcased the human experience, life, "naïve expression, and sometimes mild sadness."

Working with Iittala, she created a limited edition series of glass postcards (Lasikortti) that made glass gifts affordable and accessible.

In the 1970s, she began to specialize in ceramic print tiles, mugs and dishes, many featuring her signature hare design.

=== Writing ===
In 1977, she began writing children's books that were illustrated with photographs of her ceramic work. Her first children's storybook, Gentle Tales (Lempeitä satuja) would be followed by ten other publications for children. In 1982 she received the Finnish State Prize for Children's and Youth Culture for her books.

=== Tuuli collection ===
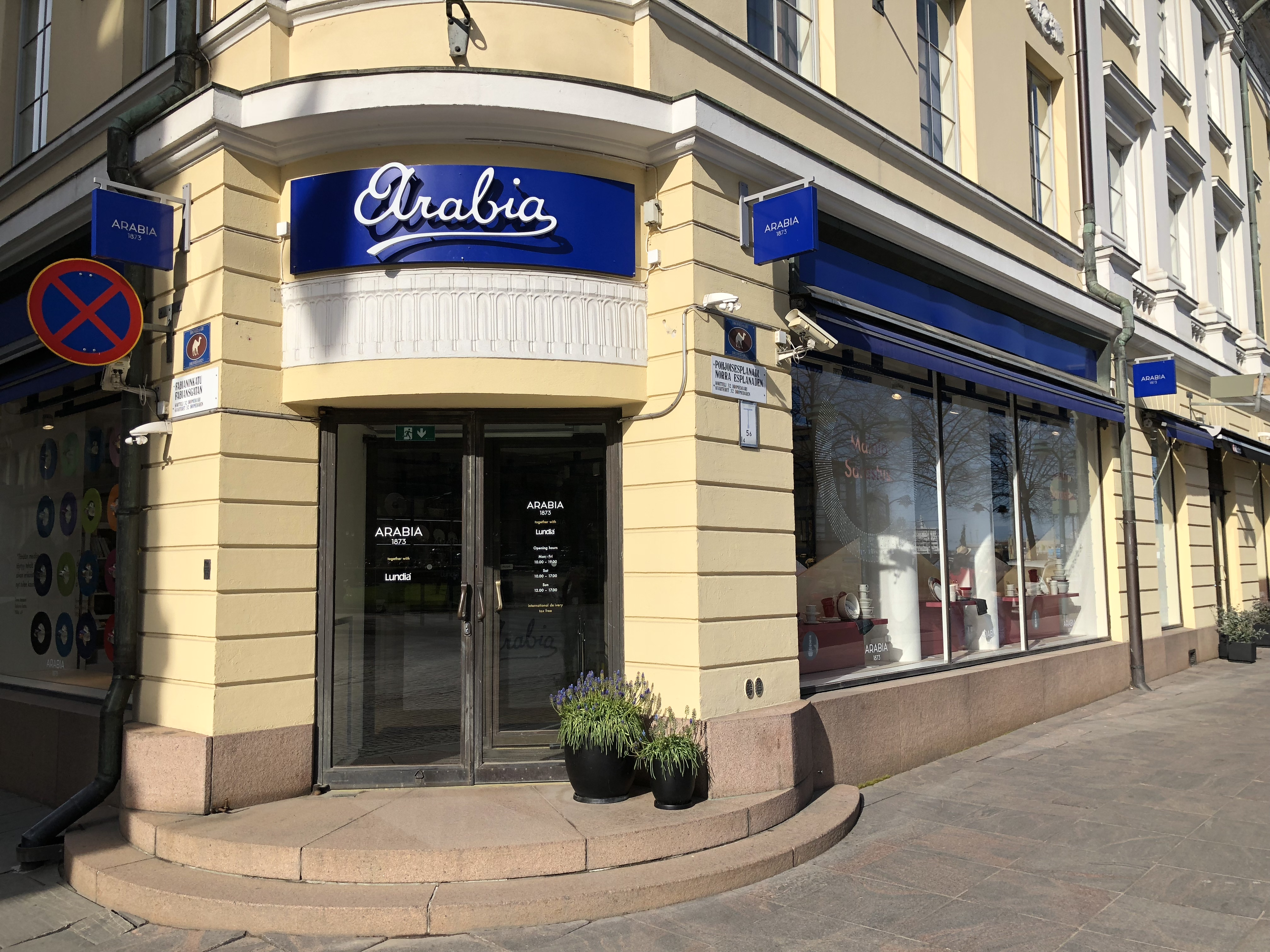
Arabia in Helsinki

In 1983, she was asked to design a tableware collection for Arabia's 110th anniversary. The Tuuli (Wind) collection was inspired by Liukko-Sundström's designs for Espoo's Olari church. The collection is considered a hallmark of Finnish design.

Liukko-Sundström was awarded an honorary professorship in 1994 for her contributions to art.

In 2001, Liukko-Sundström received the Pro Finlandia Award.

=== Closing of Arabia, opening of Ateljé Heljä ===
In 2003, Liukko-Sundström established the Arabia Art Department Society, after Arabia closed their art department. Due to campaigning by Liukko-Sundström, a small area in the factory remained open for artist residencies. She would work at the Arabia studios each Monday, Tuesday and Wednesday until the factory closed for good.

In 2005, she opened Ateljé Heljä ceramic studio in Humppila, Häme. She would continue working prolifically until her death, rising to work in her studio at 3:30 am each morning. Despite being an early riser, she would often work late into the night on her pieces. She was known for regularly opening her studio to receive guests and foreign visitors. The recognizable studio became a stopping place for visitors to the area, recognizable for its outdoor ceramic mural and seven-meter-high glass wall to provide light for working. Inside Liukko-Sundström grew tropical plants such as bananas and bougainvillea to inspire her art and connect with nature.

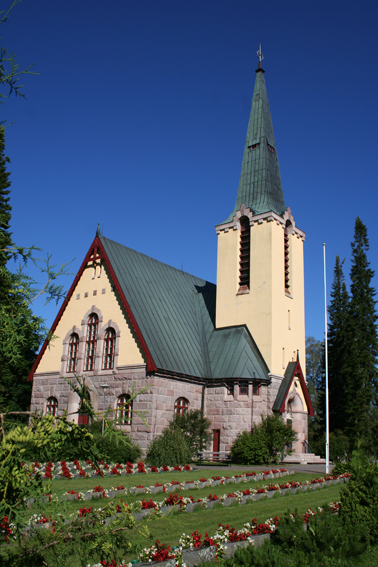
Humppila Church, located in the village of her studio where examples of Liukko-Sundströmm's work are featured.

=== Marimekko controversy ===
In 2013, Liukko-Sundström accused Finnish design studio Marimekko of imitation of one of her early designs.

"When I saw it online, I was shocked. I felt embarrassed, as if someone had entered my soul without permission. It is an imitation and the aim is to achieve my own style, my own unique feeling. At Arabia, people have always talked about Heljä's style...I have never been the target of something like this before. I don't mind if an amateur painter makes copies of my work, but this is a big business and commercial activity at Marimekko." Liukko-Sundström

At the time she did not demand compensation, but aimed to spark a conversation around the fair use and attribution of designs. At the time, several other claims of plagiarism had been raised against Marimekko, who subsequently ended a collaboration with a long-standing designer after admitting plagiarism. Marimekko strongly denied plagiarism of Liukko-Sundström's design.

=== Later years ===
In 2016, Arabia's art factory, opened in 1932 closed. Liukko-Sundström continued her work at her studio in Humppila. In 2022, when the local church celebrated its centenary, Liukko-Sundström created two ceramic works for the building. Hope, a visual of a baptism with Liukko-Sundström depicted holding the child, and Ukraine, an artwork inspired by the civilian cost of the Russian invasion of Ukraine.

Liukko-Sundström's works have been exhibited and found in museums across Finland and internationally, in the United States, Canada, Germany, Australia, Japan and Mexico.

Liukko-Sundström died in Helsinki at age 85 on 21 May 2024.

== Publications ==
- 1977 – Heljä's Gentle Fairy Tales "Heljän lempeitä satuja", Otava (Japanese 2014, Kissankieli Oy) ISBN 951-1-04484-2
- 1978 – "Mari and the crow", "Mari ja varis" Otava ISBN 951-1-04942-9
- 1981 – "The Rabbit Boy", "Jäniksenpoika", Otava (in Japanese 1983, CMS Sony, and second edition 2011, Kissankieli Oy; in Hungarian 1990) ISBN 951-1-06430-4
- 1984 – "The Computer Prince", "Tietokoneprinssi", Otava ISBN 951-1-08138-1
- 1999 – "High above, the garden of clouds is blue", "Korkealla päällä pilvien puutarha sininen" Otava ISBN 9511160133
- 2004 – "My Angel", "Oma enkelini", Kirjapaja (in Japanese 2017, Kissankieli Oy) ISBN 9516071066
- 2005 – "Olli and Dolli", Otava ISBN 951-1-20438-6
- 2006 – "The Clay Poet", "Saven runoilija", Minerva ISBN 952-482-044-7
- 2008 – "Bring the Brownie", "Toi rusakko", Kirjapaja (in Japanese 2011, Kissankieli Oy) ISBN 978-951-607-783-6
- 2012 – "Your Little Angel", "Sinun pikku enkelisi", Kirjapaja ISBN 978-952-247-199-4
- 2012 – "Somewhere Always Sun", "Jossain aina aurinko", Kirjapaja ISBN 978-952-247-374-5
