= Kaarina Aho =

Finnish ceramist and designer (1925–1990)

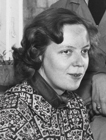
- Kaarina Aho at Arabia in 1953 (Note: Pictured in original uncropped photograph are also Saara Hopea, Ulla Procopé, and Kaj Franck.)
- Born: 1925; Helsinki
- Died: 1990 (aged 64–65)
- Alma mater: Aalto University School of Arts, Design and Architecture
- Occupation: Ceramist
- Employer: Arabia (1946–1962); self (1962–)

Kaarina Aho (28 January 1925 – 23 September 1990) was a Finnish ceramist and designer.

== Biography ==
Kaarina Aho was educated in technical drawing at the Institute of Arts and Design in Helsinki. Beginning in 1946, she worked in the design department of the Arabia ceramics factory under the direction of Kaj Franck. Initially, she was not satisfied with the work, however, when given an opportunity to train in many other aspects of the business, she chose to remain at the company. Starting in 1946, Aho played a critical role in creating an assortment of new and vivid designs. She eventually opened her own ceramics workshop in 1962.

Works by Aho are in national and international collections such as the Cooper Hewitt, Smithsonian Design Museum in New York, the British Museum and Victoria and Albert Museum in London, and others.
