= Yrjö Sotamaa =

Finnish designer and design strategist

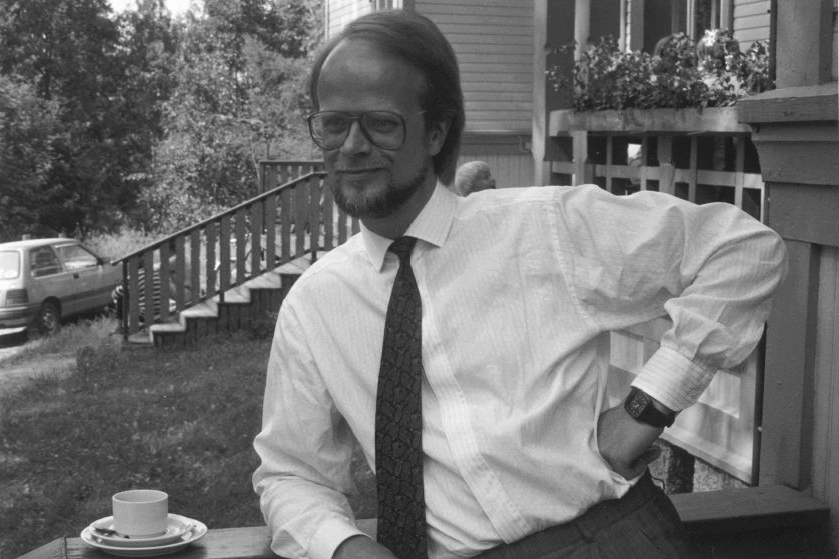
Yrjö Sotamaa during summer 1988 in Savitaipale.

Yrjö Kalervo Sotamaa (born 25 September, 1942) is a Finnish designer and design strategist. Sotamaa is Professor Emeritus of Design Innovation in the Aalto University School of Art, Design and Architecture and President Emeritus of the University of Art and Design Helsinki (TAIK). He served as the president of TAIK from 1986 until 2008. He earned his MA in Interior Architecture and Furniture Design from TAIK, where he studied with Kaj Franck and Antti Nurmesniemi.

== Career ==
During his studies (1965–1969) in the Institute of Art and Design, (later University of Art and Design and now Aalto University School of Arts, Design and Architecture) Yrjö Sotamaa was president of the institute's Student Union TOKYO. He pushed for reforms in design education, was one of the founders of the Scandinavian Design Students Organization SDO in 1966, and organized by SDO a series of high-profile international seminars and conferences (Industry, Environment, Design in Suomenlinna, 1968, Finland and Working Environment in Otaniemi, 1967, Finland) to discuss the social, ecological, economical, environmental challenges facing the Nordic societies and reforms in design education.

In 1967 and 1968 he invited to the seminars leading thinkers in design and architecture of the time including Victor Papanek, Buckminster Fuller, Christopher Alexander, and Hans Palmstjerna. This led to a close friendship with Papanek and Fuller and later, an active cooperation with them. He also published their lectures and writings in the famous &/SDO Magazine 2/1968 in 1968 (Editor in Chief), which has been recently included to three major exhibitions of the cultural radicalism in 1960's: You Say You Want a REVOLUTION? Records and Rebels 1966–1970, Victor Papanek: The Politics of Design, and Scandinavian Design and the United States, 1890-1980 (LACMA).

In 1969–1970 Sotamaa was a visiting professor at Purdue University (USA) by the invitation of Professor Victor Papanek and was a close collaborator of Papanek for several years. During his time in Purdue he also collaborated with Buckminster Fuller whose World Resources Inventory Centre was closely located to Purdue in Carbondale, Illinois.

In 1972–1973 he studied with a Finnish State Grant nomadic cultures and handicrafts in East Africa.

In 1975 Sotamaa entered the service of TAIK as head of Department of Interior Architecture and Furniture Design and was nominated by the Finnish Government to president of the university in 1986. During his time as president (1986-2008) of TAIK the university grew to one of the leading art and design institutions in the world. President Sotamaa had also a visible role in the development of the Art and Design City, the Arabianranta area of Helsinki where the university is situated, under the notion of the Living Lab. The concept was first put forward by MIT Professor William Mitchell, in terms of a research methodology for sensing, prototyping, validating and refining complex solutions in multiple and evolving real life contexts. Art and Design City become an international benchmark for innovation driven future city development.

He has also played a visible role in renewing the Finnish university system and is the "father" of the Helsinki Innovation University project, named Aalto University, which started operating on 1.1.2010.

Sotamaa has also played a key role in the creation of the Finnish and Danish national design policies, the EU User Driven Innovation Policy and the reinforcement of the position of design in the Finnish Innovation System.

Sotamaa has held a number of expert positions. Sotamaa was elected in 2001 to be the first President of CUMULUS, the International Association of Universities and Colleges of Art, Design and Media (2001-2007). Cumulus is today the most important global association to serve art and design education and research. It is a forum for partnership and transfer of knowledge and best practices. Cumulus consists currently of 395 members from 71 countries.

He was chairman of the Foundation of the Finnish Institute in Japan during 1996–2009, chairman of the Board of the Art and Design City Helsinki ADC Ltd (2000–2010), vice-president of the Finnish Council of University Rectors (1997–2003) and member of the Round Table of Design in Finland (2000–2010). As chairman of the Finnish Information Society Forum and as a member of the Information Society Forum of the European Union (1995–1999), he participated in research on the evolution of the information society and in the planning of future strategies. He was the vice-chairman for the National Committee preparing the new Governments Art and Artist Policy Programme for Finland.

Sotamaa was executive vice director of the Sino-Finnish Centre at Tongji University during 2010–2013. He has served as a scientific advisor to universities in Austria, China, Denmark, England and Korea and been visiting professor at Nottingham Trent University, UK (2008–2012). He has been member of the Steering Group of the Danish Center for Design Research (2004–2013), the Higher Education Funding Council of England Funding Review Panel for Specialist Institutions (2015–2016), the External Review Committee of Tsinghua University, PRC (2010), the International Advisory Board of the Austrian Program for Arts-based Research PEEK (Austrian Science Foundation (2008–2012) and the Helsinki World Design Capital 2012 Delegation. Sotamaa was invited by the Danish Government to be a member of Design 2020 expert group to create a vision for Denmark as a design nation. Sotamaa was also Chairman of the Radical Design Week Shanghai 2012 Steering Group.

He has served as chairman of the Tapio Wirkkala Rut Bryk Foundation TWRB and the Japan-Finland Design Association JFDA (Finland). He has been member of the boards of many culture organisations including the Asko Foundation, the Väinö Tanner Foundation, the Finnish Culture Foundation and on the advisory boards of the Finnish Cultural Institutes in Rome and Madrid. He is founding member of the Finnish-Swedish Academy of Industrial Design.

== Current activities ==
Chairman of Ateljé Sotamaa Ltd, juror of the Frontier Design Prize 2025, advisor and juror of The Don Norman Design Award 2025, juror of the HONOR Global Talents Design Competition 2025, member of the International Academic Committee of Tongji University Shanghai International College of Design and Innovation, professor (Tongji-Forever Chair) and honorary dean at College of Design and Innovation D&I in Tongji University, Shanghai, PRC, the chairman of the Radical Design Week Association RDWA and member of the editorial advisory board of 设计 (She Ji), The Journal of Design, Economics, and Innovation, published by Elsevier in cooperation with Tongji University. He is member of the Court of the Royal College of Art, London, UK.

== Production ==
An underlining theme of Sotamaa's activities has been related to forwarding sustainable development through innovative design and international collaboration. The culmination of this work was the Kyoto Design Declaration in 2008 emphasizing the importance of human centered design thinking and sustainability. Sotamaa has been also actively involved in university policies and produced numerous publications and articles on university autonomy, academic quality systems and internationalizing university education.

The international design production of Sotamaa includes two major international exhibitions: Varde and Q - Designing the Quietness. Varde was produced by six major Nordic Design Universities with the support of the Nordic Council of Ministers. Over 300 students of the six schools were addressing the future challenges of the world and producing visions of the future through their works. The exhibition was first presented in the Royal College of Art in London and toured around the world in 1994–1996 in Rome, Berlin, Budapest, Barcelona, Sapporo, Taipei, Seoul, Linz and Helsinki. Q -Designing the Quietness was a major event of the Feel Finland program in Japan in 2003 and was first presented in the Living Design Center Ozone in Tokyo and later in 2004 in Fiskars Design Village, Finland. Books on the themes of the exhibitions were published in 1994 and in 2003. The most recent major projects chaired by Sotamaa were the Radical Design Week in Shanghai 2012, the largest Finnish-Chinese joint initiative since Finland participation to world Expo 2010, The Sino Finnish Challenge (main event in China celebrating 100th year of Finnish Independence in 2017), and the five year Life in Future Cities Program based on Finnish-Chinese cooperation.

Sotamaa's major policy publications include works on university autonomy, academic quality, art and design policy. The Economic Autonomy of the Finnish Universities (Yliopistojen taloudellinen autonomia, Finnish University Rectors Council, 2002) laid foundations on the expansion of the autonomy and the reform of Finnish Universities in 2008. The other university publications include: Quality in Focus (Laatu polttopisteessä, Finnish University Rectors Council, 2002). Sotamaa was chairperson of the expert groups writing both of the publications. The latest publication edited by Sotamaa, Jokinen and Haapoja, Out of the Box, deals with the 2010 Finnish University Reform. The policy reports include Art is Opportunities, which was a proposal to governments Art and Artist policy. Sotamaa was vice chairperson of the expert group writing the proposal. The second policy work resulted to Design 2005!, Government Decision-in-Principle on Finnish Design Policy.

Sotamaa is author of the Kyoto Design Declaration, which was approved by CUMULUS Association in 2008, and in which the global community of 140 Art and Design institutions committed themselves to sustainable development. He has also published Ateneum Maskerad, Forms and Transformations of Finnish Design (chairman of the project), Sisustusarkkitehtuurista palvelumuotoiluun: 50 vuoden murros (From Interior Architecture to Service Design - 50 Years Transition)(ed.), 2019. and PRO ARTE UTILI - multidisciplinary collaboration - a key to success (Designmuseum 2021)(ed.), Aalto. "Yliopiston synty (Aalto. Birth of the University)" TEOS 2024)(ed.), "Elinvoimaa kulttuurista (Vigor from culture)"(2024) (ed.) and Elinvoimaa kulttuurista II (ed.)(2025)(ISBN 978-952-99684-6-6). Sotamaa is co-author of DesignS: World Design Cities Shanghai Manifesto 2024 and the Cumulus Design Declaration 2025.

Sotamaa is an active writer and has been columnist for the Finnish business daily newspapers Kauppalehti Presso and Kauppalehti (2004-2009). He has been member of the Editorial Boards of Asia Design Journal (Korea), All Design Magazine (PRC) and She Ji. The Journal of Design, Economics, and Innovation, Published by Elsevier. Sotamaa's speeches and articles were published by Aalto University in the book Vapaus olla paras (Freedom to be the Best!).

== Creator ==
Sotamaa has contributed extensively to international collaboration in art and design and has initiated the founding of several of major organizations: CUMULUS Network (1990), CUMULUS, the International Association of Universities and Colleges of Art, Design and Media (2001), The Finnish Institute in Japan (1996), The Japan-Finland Design Association JFDA (2000), The Finnish-Swedish Academy of Industrial Design (2003), The Sino-Finnish Centre at Tongji University (2010) and the Aalto-Tongji Design Factory in Shanghai (2010).

== Awards ==
Sotamaa has been awarded over 30 awards and recognitions including Honorary Doctorates by the Aalto University School of Arts, Design and Architecture (2013) and by the Estonian Academy of Arts (2004) and the honorary title of President Emeritus by Cumulus Association in 2014. He is Honorary Chairman of the Finnish Institute in Japan and Honorary Fellow of the Royal College of Art in the UK, the Aalto University School of Art and Design, the Finnish Association of Designers (ORNAMO) and Graafiset muotoilijat (GM). He is a Member of the Comité d´honneur of Ecole Supérieure d´Arts Graphiques et d´Architecture Interieure-Design ESAG-Penninghen, France.

Sotamaa has been awarded the 1.000.000 RMB Frontier Design Prize 2023 by Design Innovation Institute Shanghai DIIS, Honorary Member of Friends of the Design and Architecture Museums in Finland Association in 2023, Gold Estlander Medal by Design Forum Finland in 2017, the Finnish Design Lifetime Achievement Award in 2013, the Person of the Year by Shanghai City of Design in 2013, the Magnolia Award of Shanghai City in 2011, Medal of the Helsinki University of Technology in 2011, the Lifetime Achievement Award by CUMULUS Association in 2010, the Prix Met de Penninghen, Ecole Superiéure d´Arts Graphiques et d´Architecture Interieure-Design Esag-Penninghen in 2007, the State Service Award in 2006, the Sign of Honor of the Latvian Academy of Arts in 2006, the Albert Gebhard Medal of the Graphic Designers Association, Finland in 2003, the Elias Lönnrot Medal of the Finnish Culture Foundation in 2002, the MTV3 Finland Culture Prize in 1999. In 2002 he was a Nominee for the World Technology Award in Design. Sotamaa was awarded the Most Beautiful Book of the Year 2000 Prize and he is listed in the Who is Who in the World and International Who is Who of Professionals.

Sotamaa has been decorated with the Chinese Government Friendship Award 2014 (the highest recognition to foreign experts in China); Order of the Rising Sun, Gold Rays with Neck Ribbon, Japan; the Golden Medal of the City of Helsinki, Finland; Commander, Order of the Lion of Finland; Commandeur in de Orde van Oranje-Nassau, Netherlands; Knight, First Class of the Order of the White Rose of Finland.
