= Liukko =

Liukko is a Finnish surname. Notable people with the surname include:

- Heljä Liukko-Sundström (1938–2024), Finnish ceramicist, potter, artist and children's writer
- Riitta Jouppila (née Liukko; born 1940), Finnish physician and politician
- Ville Liukko (born 1974), professional tennis player from Finland
