= Pikku-Vesijärvi =

Lake in Lahti, Finland

Coordinates: 60.9892°N 25.6456°E

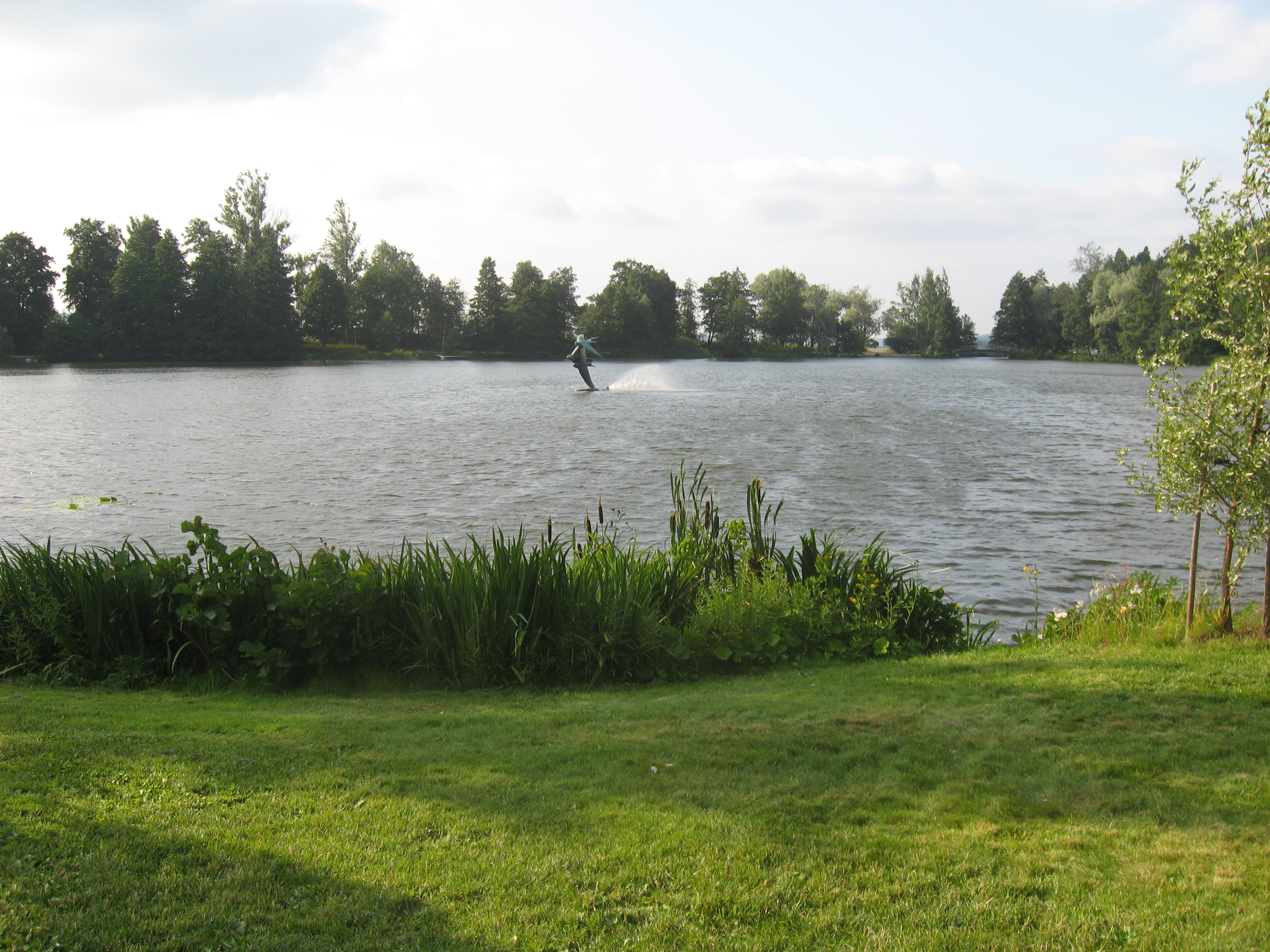
a statue in the middle of Pikku-Vesijärvi

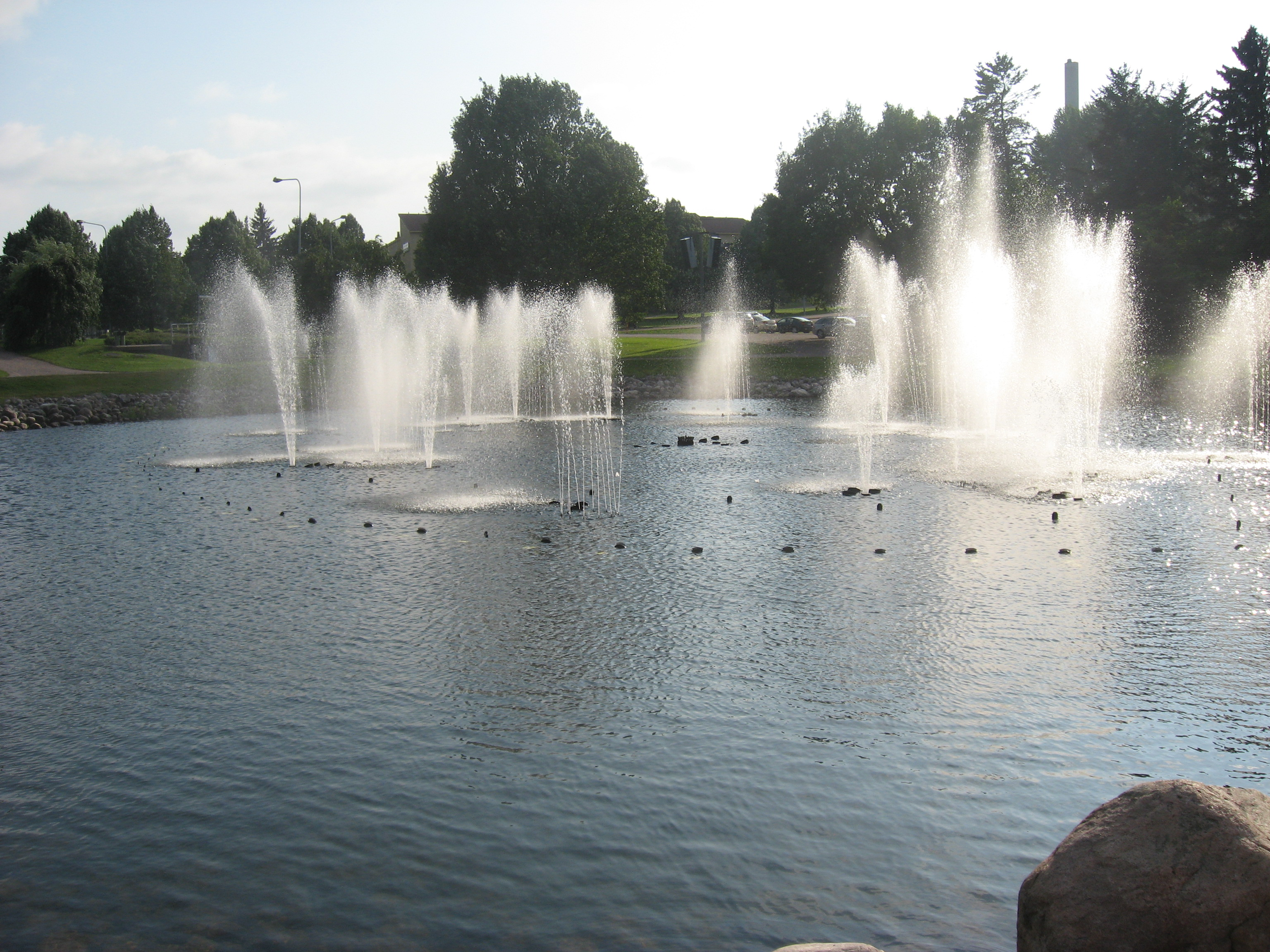
Musical fountain

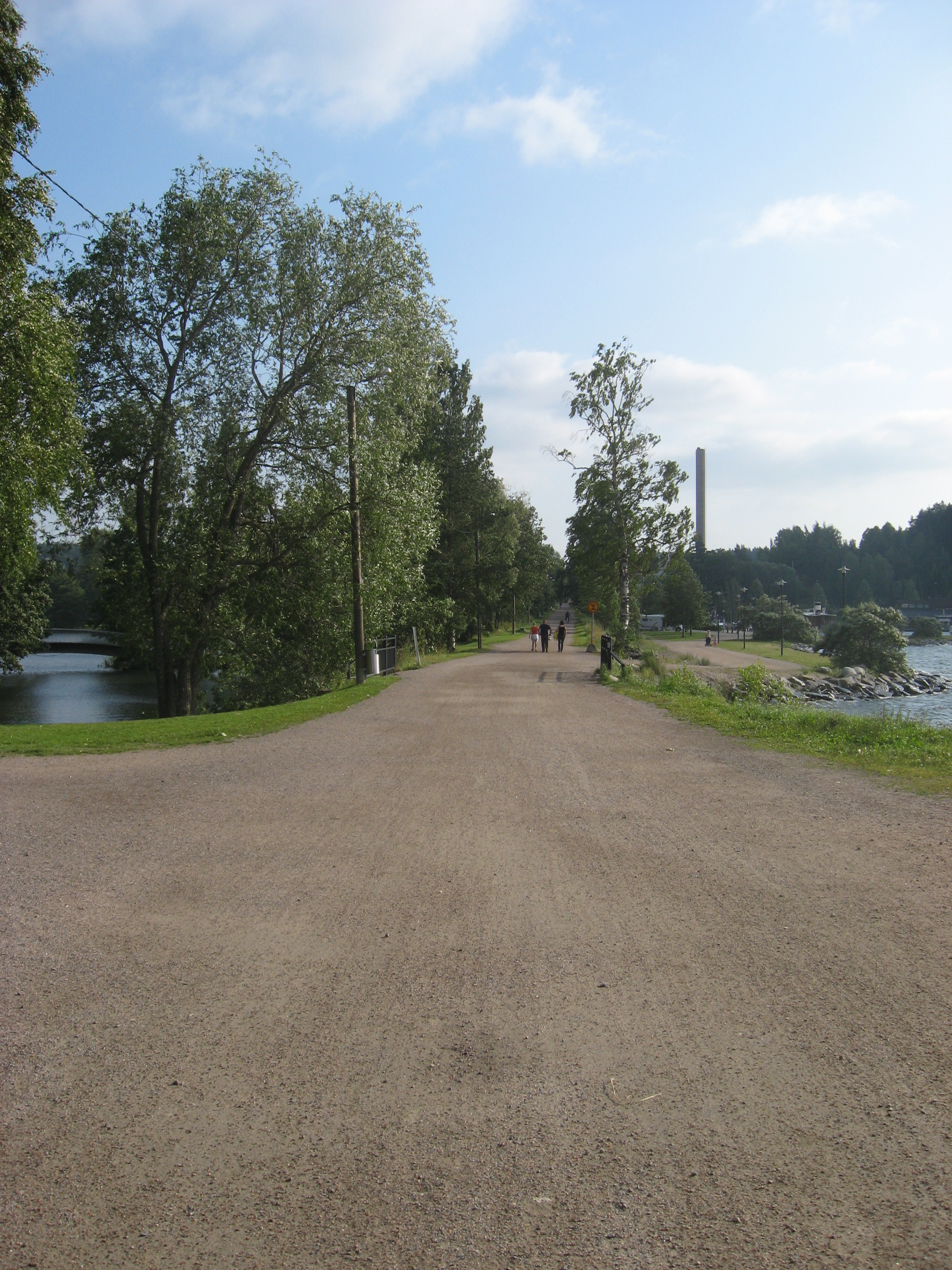
A walking path on the site of a former railroad.

Pikku-Vesijärvi is a pond in Lahti, Päijät-Häme, Finland. Its deepest point is at 4.5 meters (1998). It's a former bay of Lake Vesijärvi. The pond is surrounded by an arboretum park with trees of more than 40 different species. Adjacent to Pikku-Vesijärvi is the Lanu Park with 12 Olavi Lanu statues. The pond is connected to Vesijärvi by a small canal. Being located in the Lahti city centre, Pikku-Vesijärvi is a popular recreational spot for the city's inhabitants.
