= Lanu-puisto =

Park in Lahti, Finland

Coordinates: 60.991°N 25.650°E

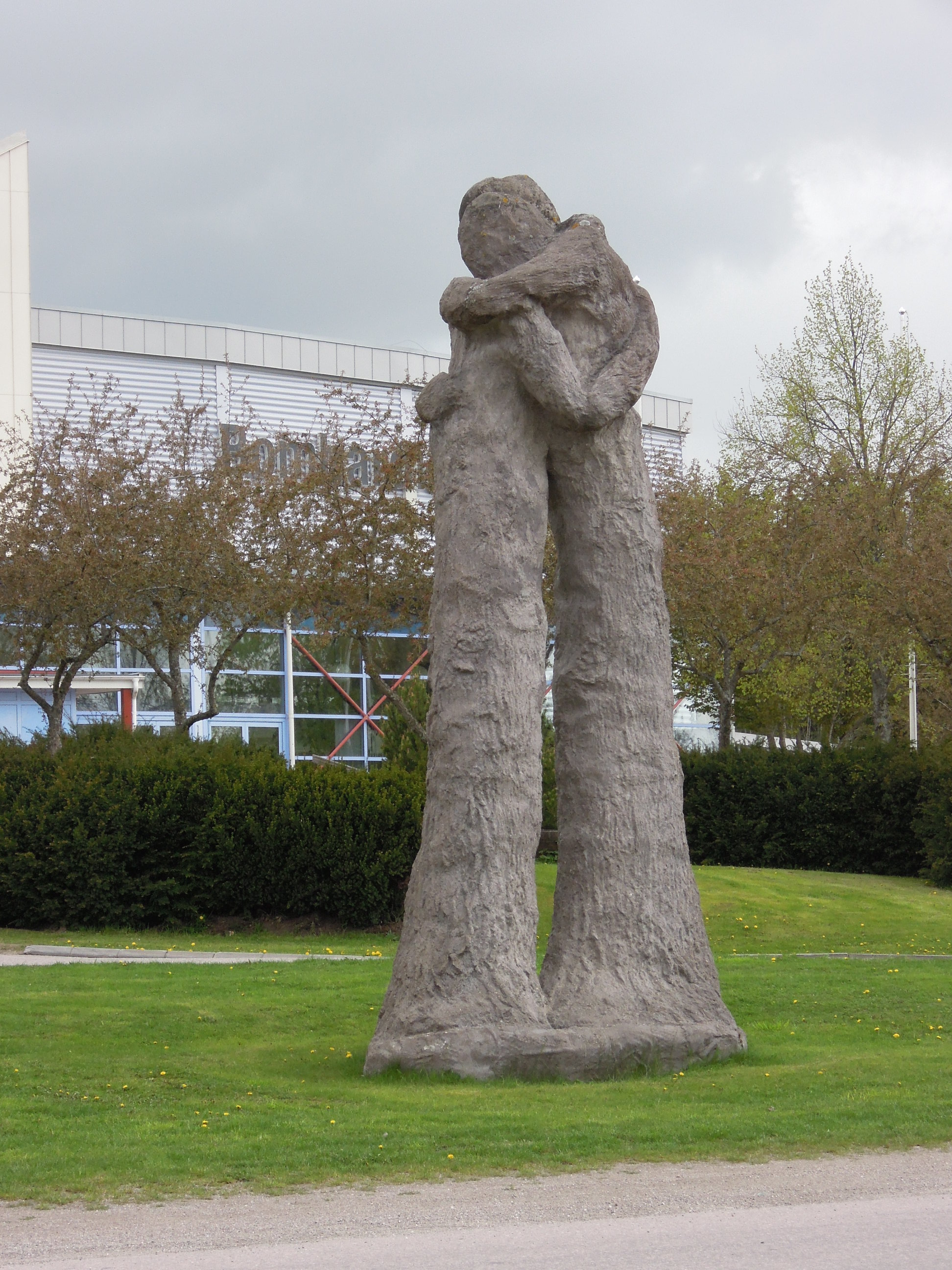

Lanu-puisto is a park near Pikku-Vesijärvi in Lahti, Finland. There are 12 statues of concrete made by the sculptor Olavi Lanu. The park was built in 1988–1992.
