= Arabia (brand) =

Finnish ceramics company

- Product type: Faience, porcelain
- Current owner: Fiskars Corporation
- Country: Finland
- Introduced: 1873
- Previous owners: Hackman; Rörstrand

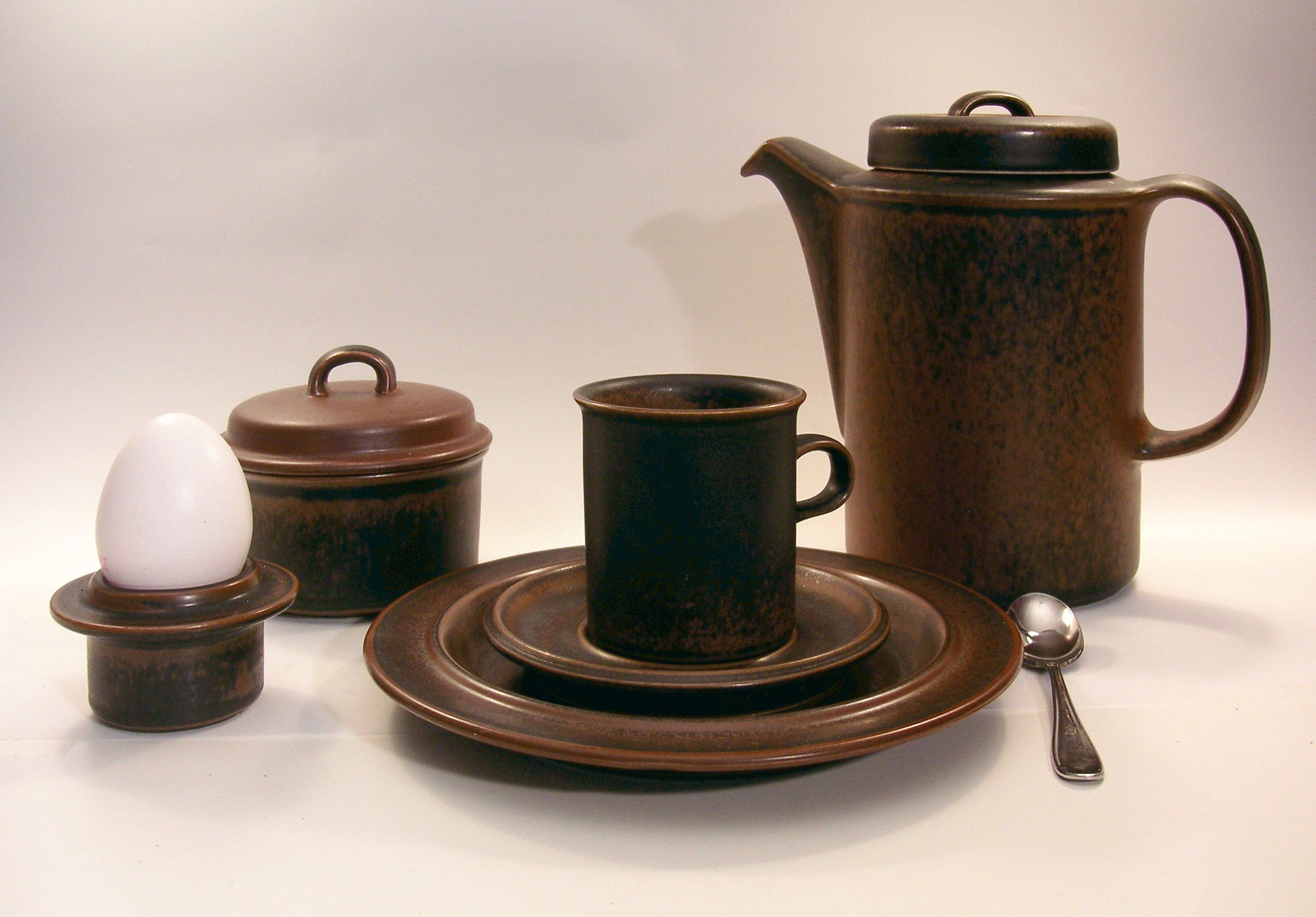
Arabia Ruska, by Ulla Procopé

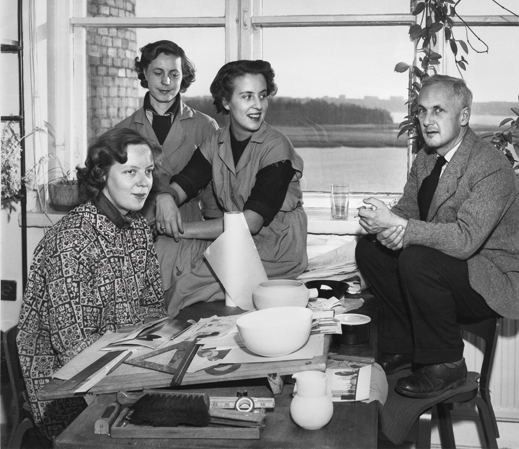
Arabia designers in 1953: Kaarina Aho (left), Saara Hopea, Ulla Procopé and Kaj Franck

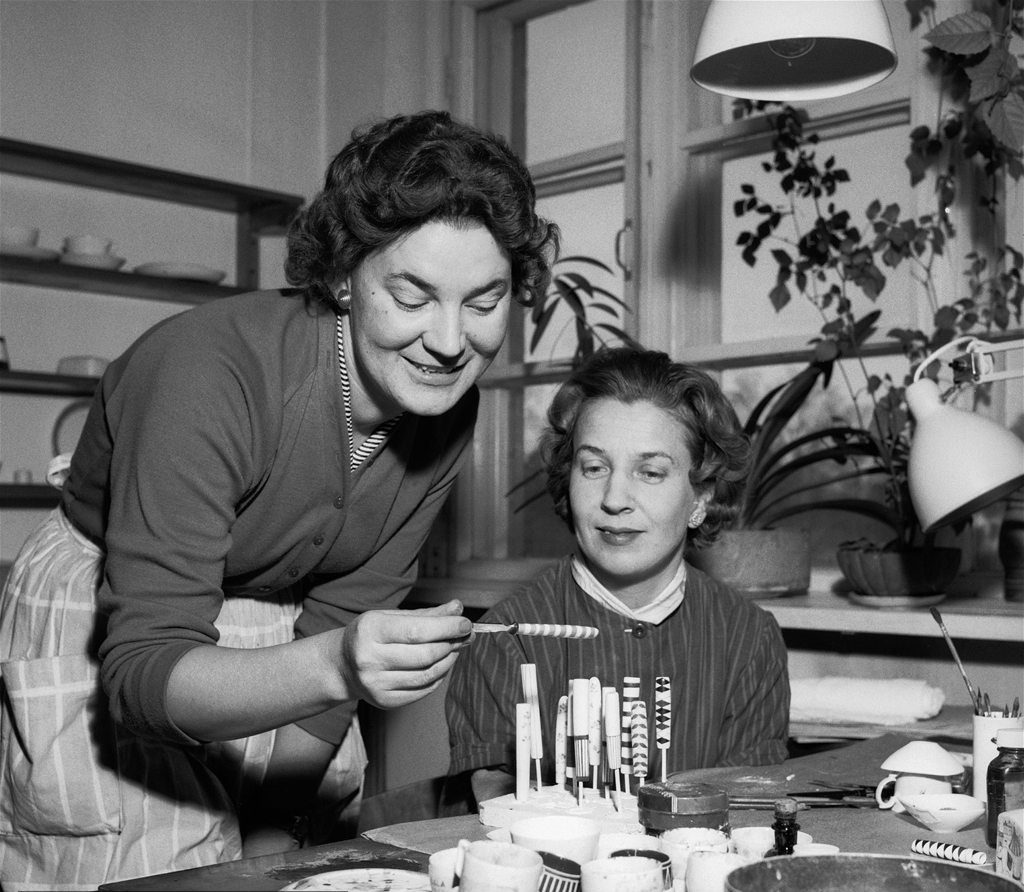
Raija Uosikkinen and Esteri Tomula at the Arabian ceramics factory in 1957

Arabia was a Finnish ceramics company, founded in 1873 by Rörstrand, now owned by Fiskars. Arabia has specialized in faience and porcelain kitchenware and tableware.

The original Arabia porcelain factory was located in Toukola (Helsinki). It later housed the Aalto University School of Arts, Design and Architecture.

Ulla Procopé, Esteri Tomula, Birger Kaipiainen and Kaj Franck were among the best-known artists and designers for the company.

In 1990 the company was acquired by Hackman and was incorporated into the Hackman trademark. In 2016 the Arabia factory in Finland closed. All Arabia products are now made in Thailand and Romania.

== History ==
Founded as a subsidiary of the Swedish porcelain producer Rörstrand on November 25, 1873, the Arabia brand has gone through numerous ownership changes since its founding.

Carl-Gustaf Herlitz, formerly an employee of Rörstrand, was recruited in 1881 to serve as the technical director. The limited company Arabia Aktiefabrik was founded in 1885, to which Herlitz was appointed managing director in 1893. A couple of years later in the 1890s, Thure Öberg was poached from Röstrand and become the company's first artist. Öberg worked in Arabia until his death in 1935.

In 1916, the company was transferred to Finnish ownership, and Herlitz's son Carl-Gustaf Herlitz took over the position of CEO until 1947. Over the course of his tenure, the company expanded and became the largest in the Nordic region. From 1947 to 1990, Arabia was owned by Wärtsilä Oy, and in 1990 was sold to Hackman. Today, the Arabia brand is owned by the Iittala Group, which broke away from Hackman, and in 2007 was taken over by Fiskars.

Kurt Ekholm was appointed artistic director of Arabia's art department in 1932, pioneering innovative tableware design. For a time, the company employed over 1,500 employees, and was the largest porcelain factory in Europe. They also produced toilet seats in Helsinki's Arabianranta and Ekenäs between 1874 and 1992. On March 18, 2016, production of the ceramics factory in Fishers was stopped and moved abroad.

== Noted designers ==
- Ulla Procopé
- Esteri Tomula
- Kaj Franck
- Toini Muona
- Heikki Orvola
- Birger Kaipiainen
- Friedl Kjellberg
- Mona Morales-Schildt
- Kyllikki Salmenhaara
- Raija Uosikkinen (1923–2004)
- Inkeri Leivo (1944–2010)
- Heljä Liukko-Sundström (1938–2024)
- Kaarina Aho (1925–1990)
- Richard Lindh (1929–2006)
- Tove Slotte
Old Arabia factory building in Helsinki

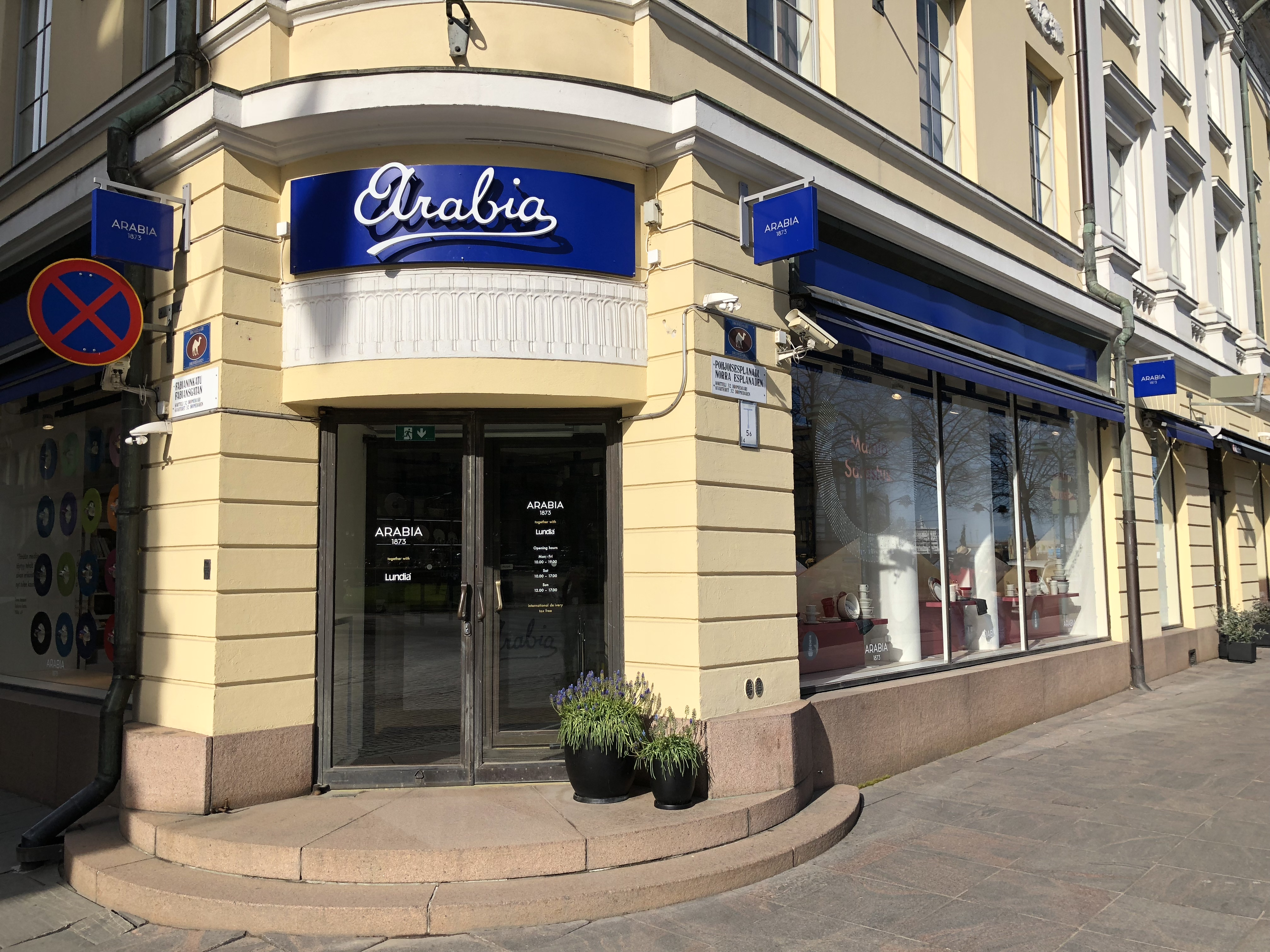
Arabia Store on Pohjoisesplanadi, Helsinki

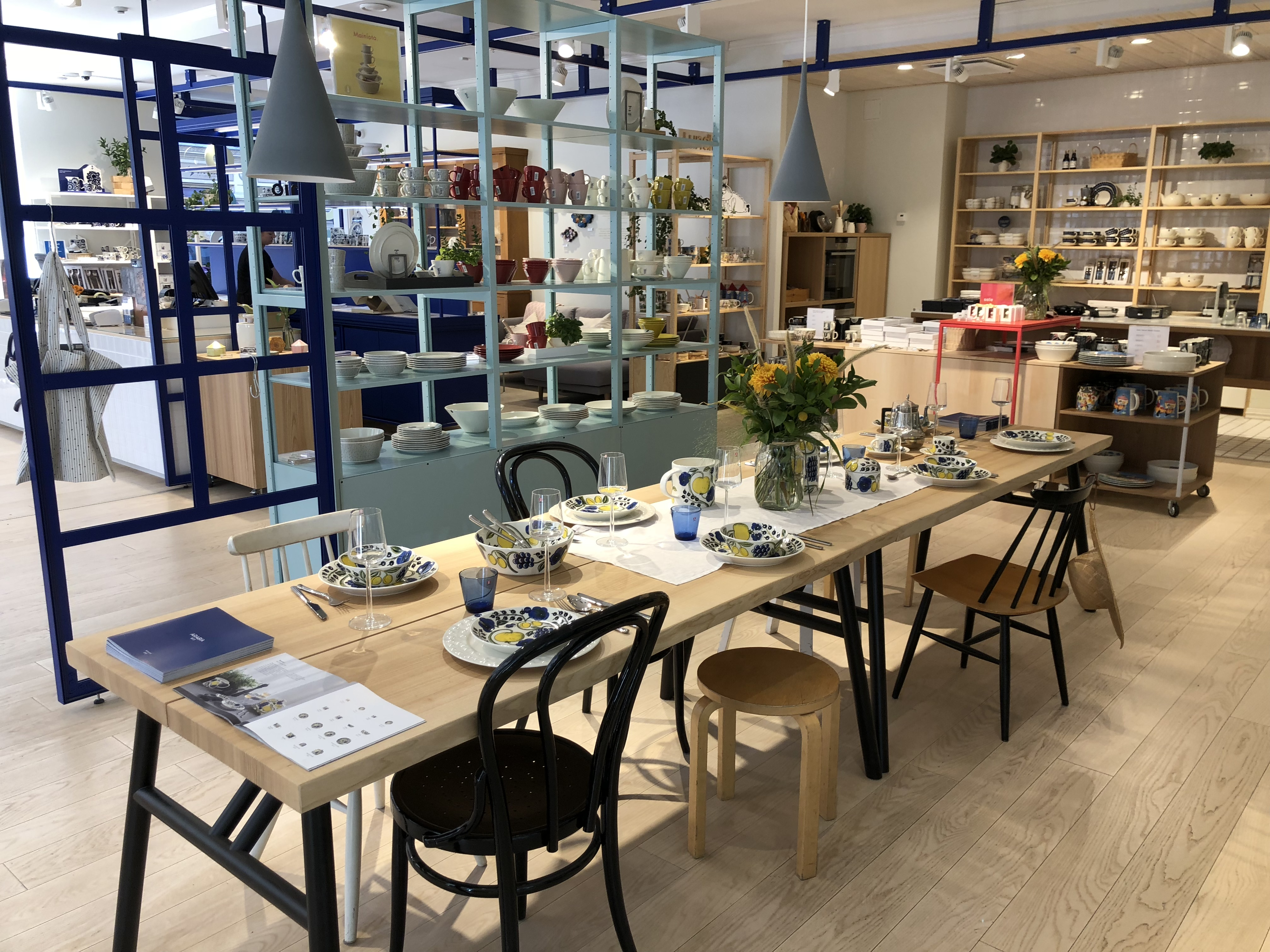
Inside Arabia Store in Helsinki

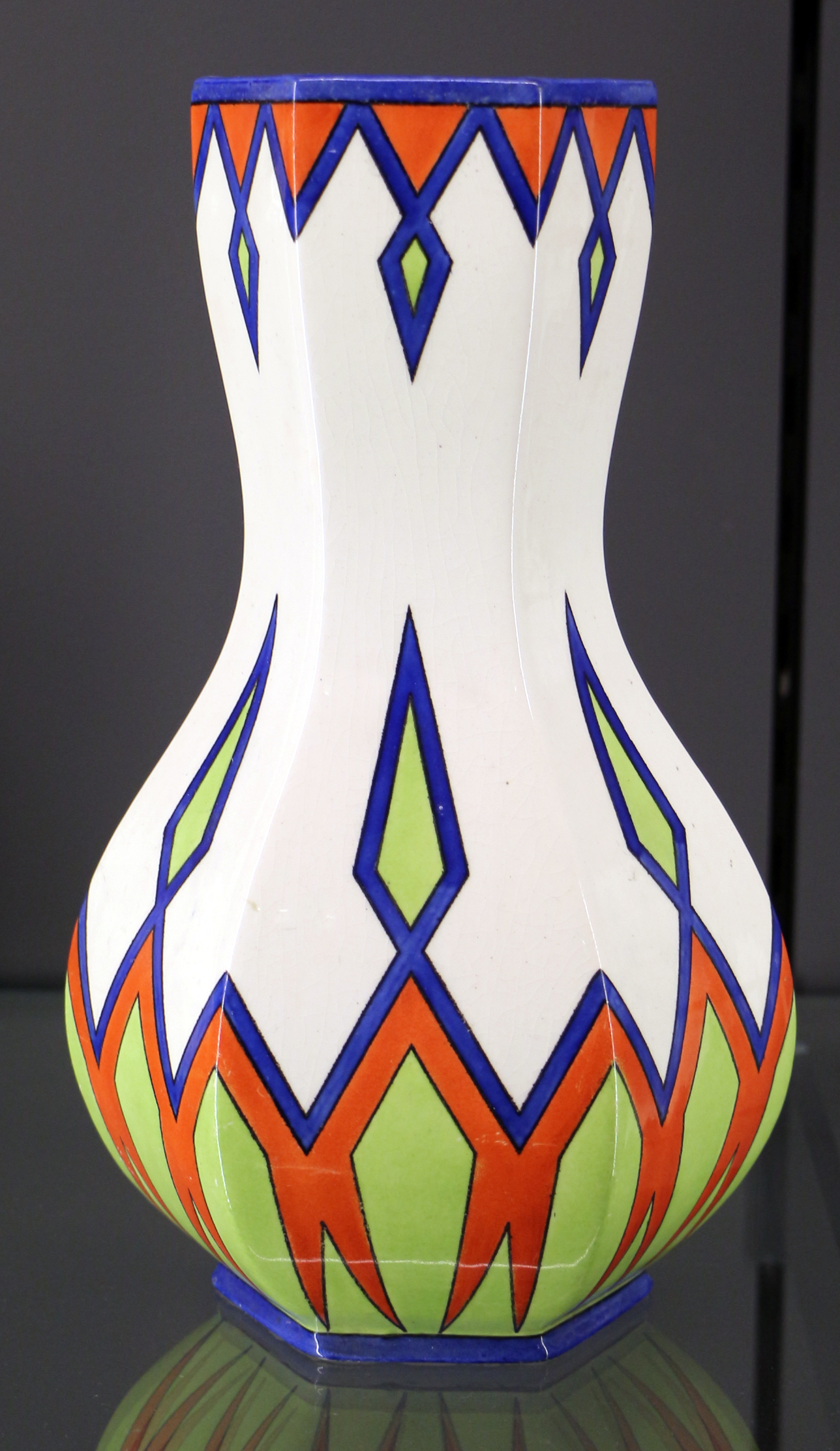
Arabia Fennia vase (1902)

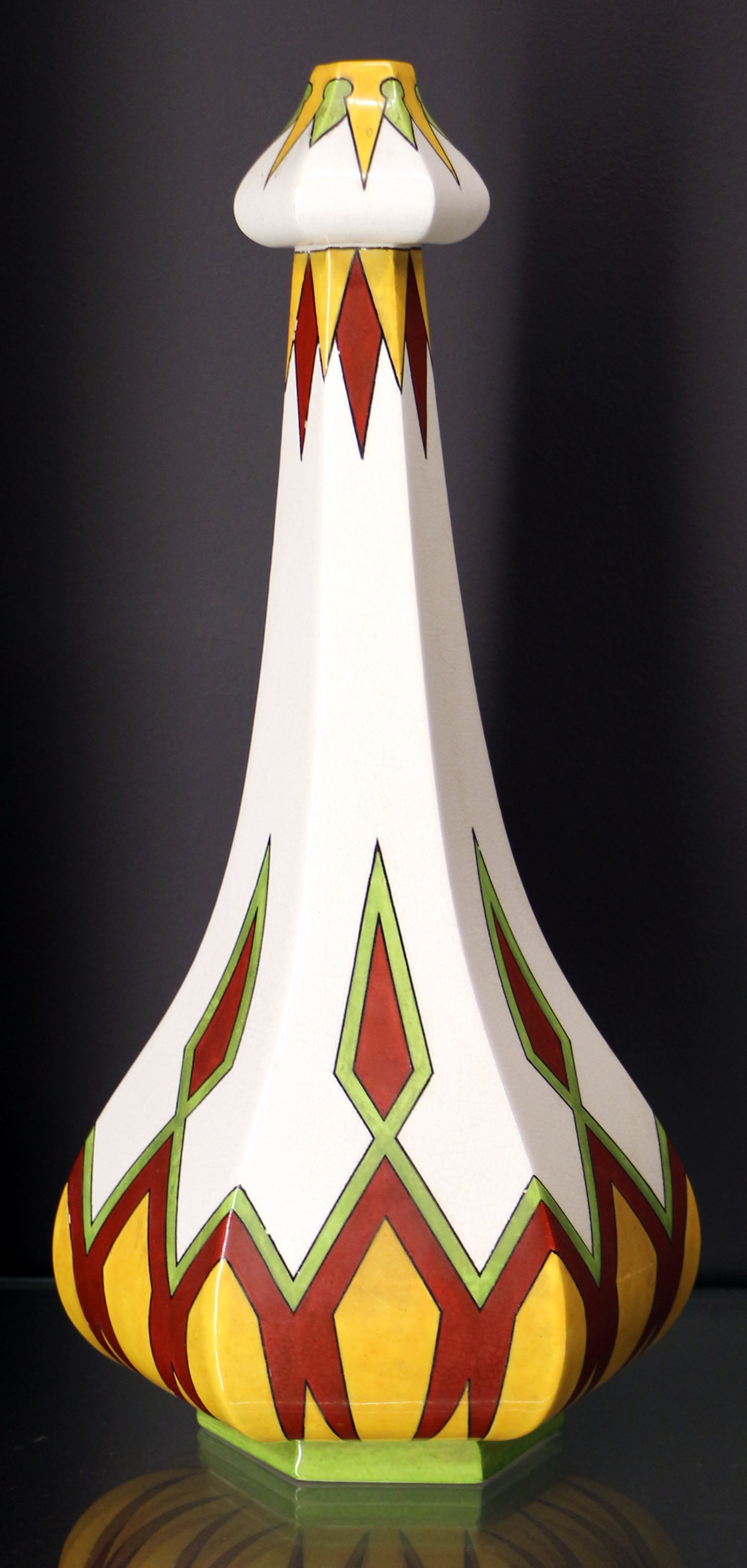
Another example of a Fennia vase (1902)

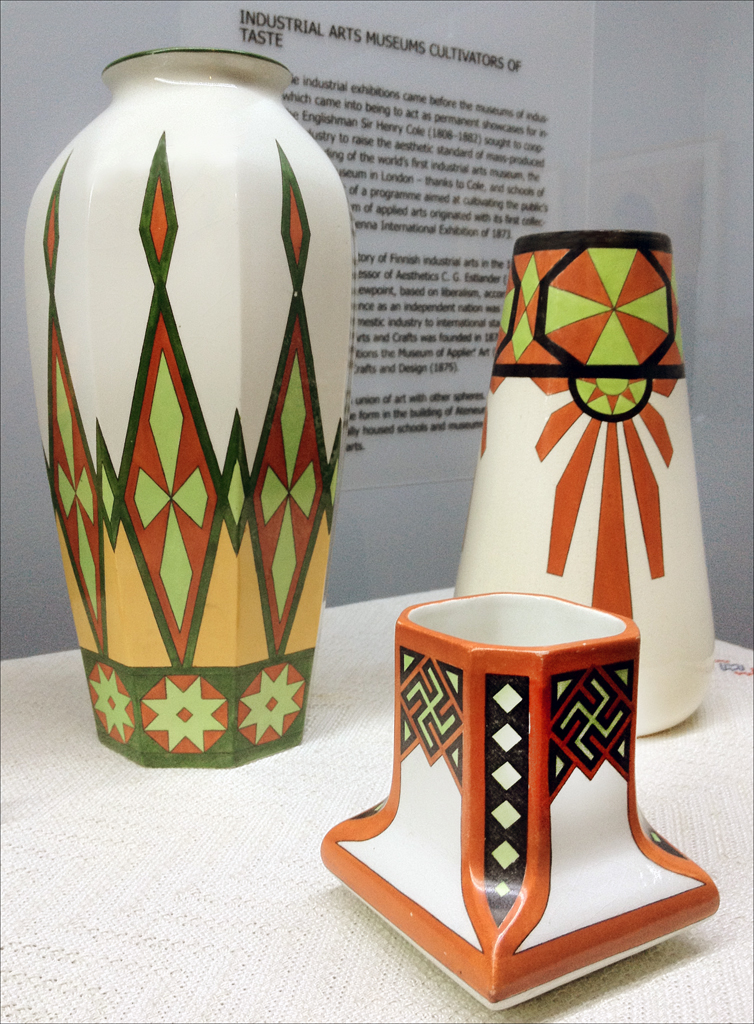
Arabia pieces in the Helsinki design museum

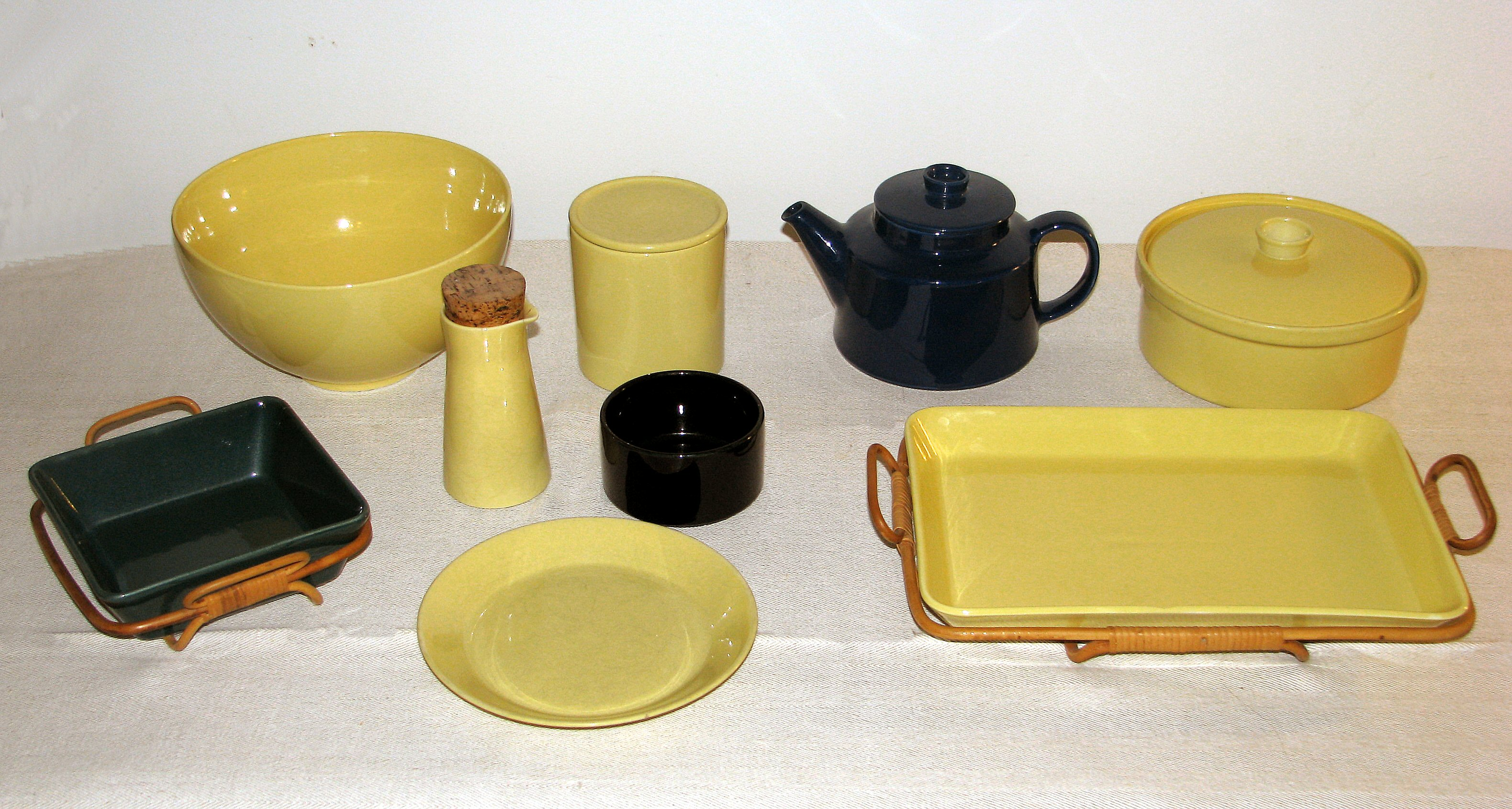
Kilta receptacle set (1953)

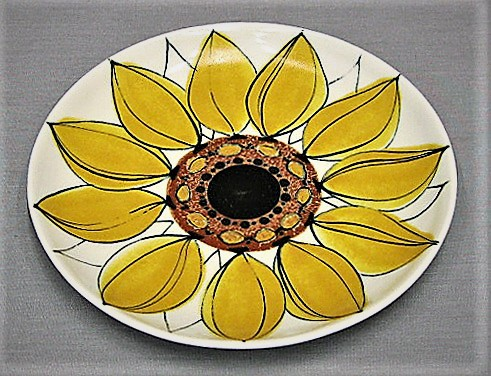
Kaarina Aho design (1957)

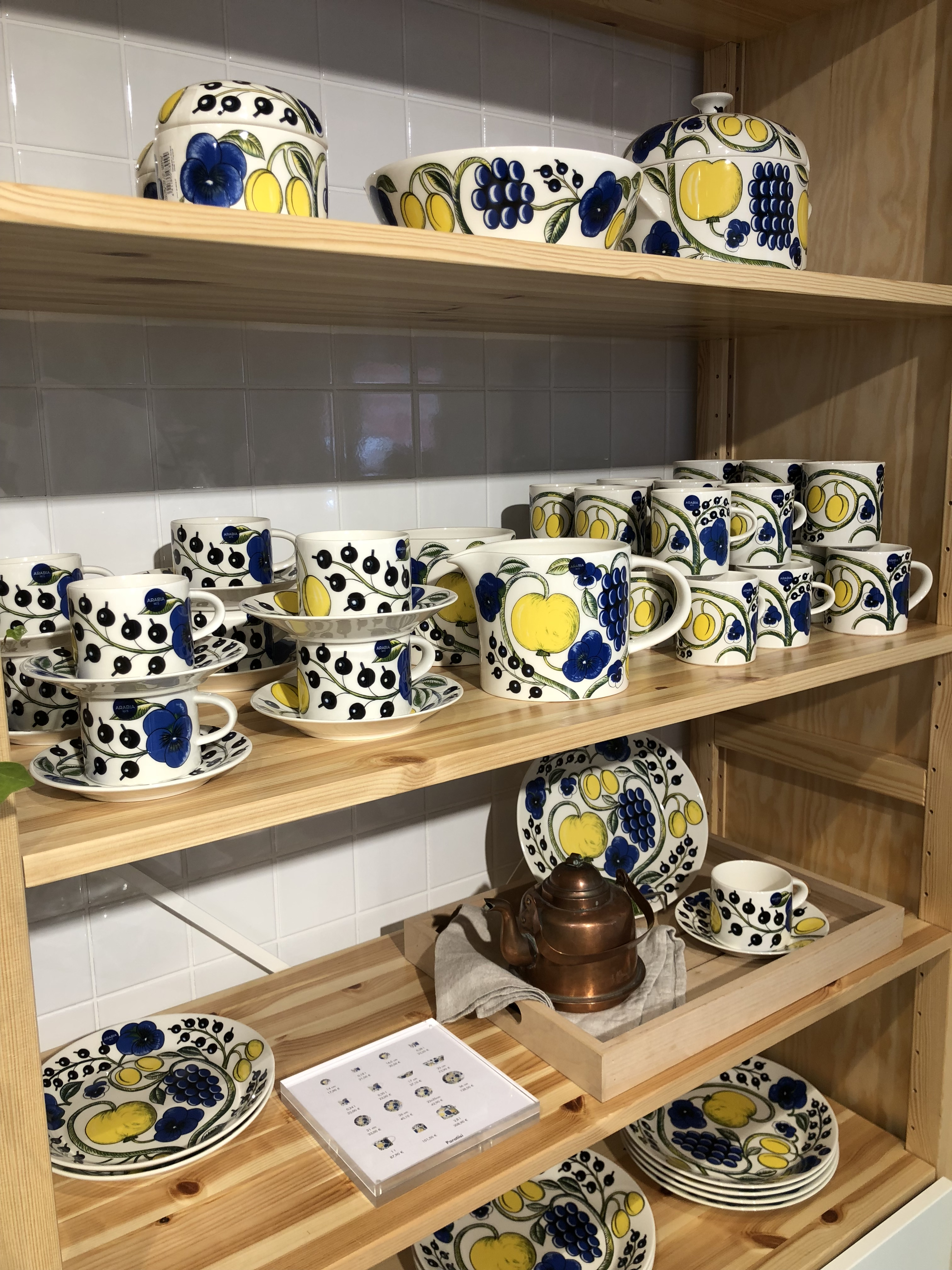
An Arabia brand Paratiisi series

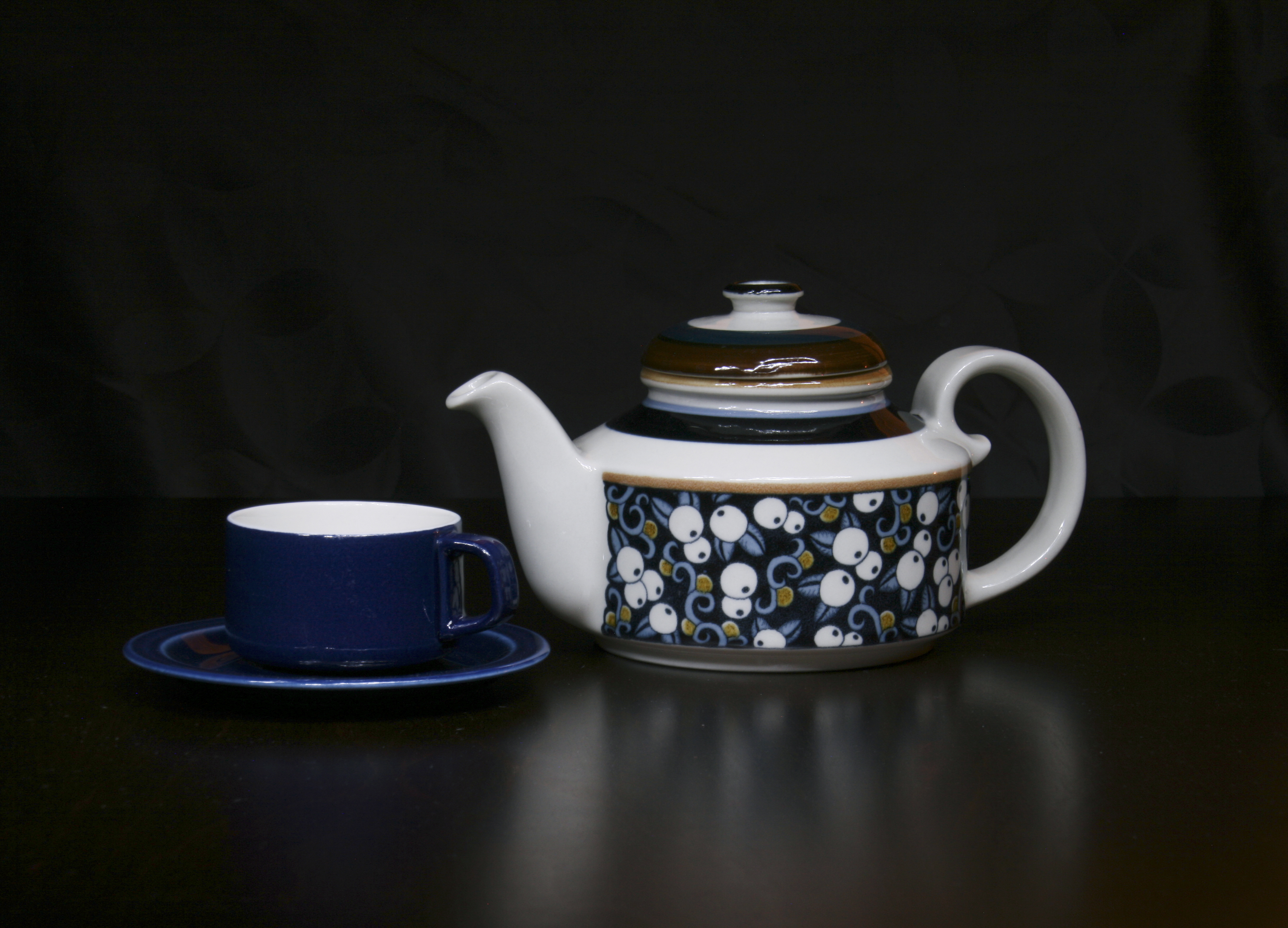
Teapot Taika (1970s)

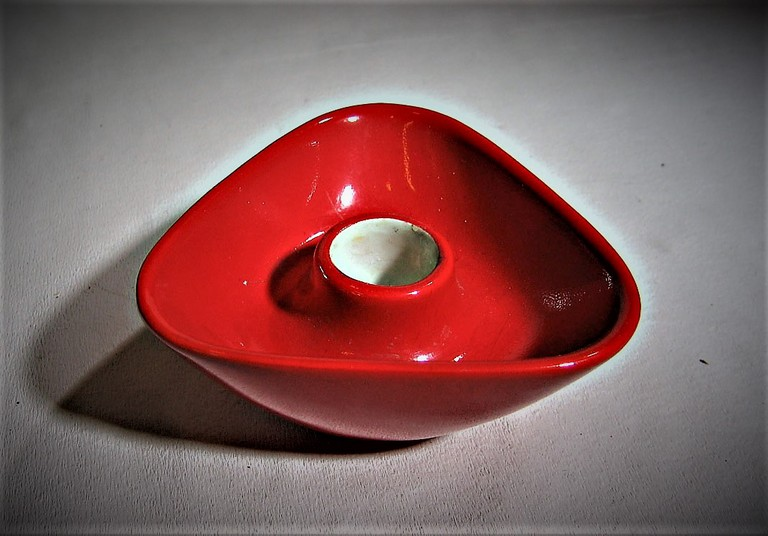
Candle holder by Ulla Procopé

== See also ==
- Arabianranta
- Porcelain manufacturing companies in Europe
