= Vesijärvi =

Lake in Päijät-Häme region, Finland

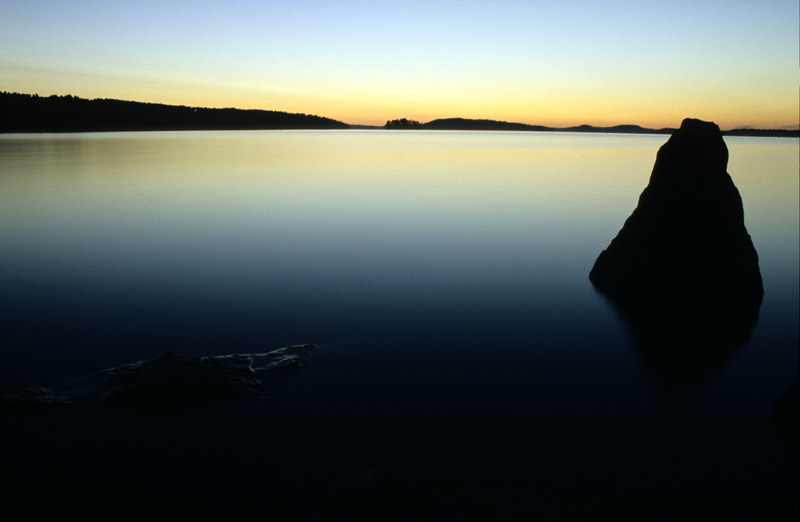
- Vesijärvi at night

- Location within Finland
- Location: Päijät-Häme
- Coordinates: 61°04′58″N 025°32′18″E
- Basin countries: Finland
- Max. length: 25 km (16 mi)
- Surface area: 107.57 km^{2} (41.53 sq mi)
- Average depth: 6 m (20 ft)
- Max. depth: 42 m (138 ft)
- Water volume: 484×10^{6} m^{3} (17.1×10^{9} cu ft)
- Shore length^{1}: 181 km (112 mi)
- Surface elevation: 81.4 m (267 ft)
- Settlements: Asikkala, Lahti
- ^{1} Shore length is not a well-defined measure.

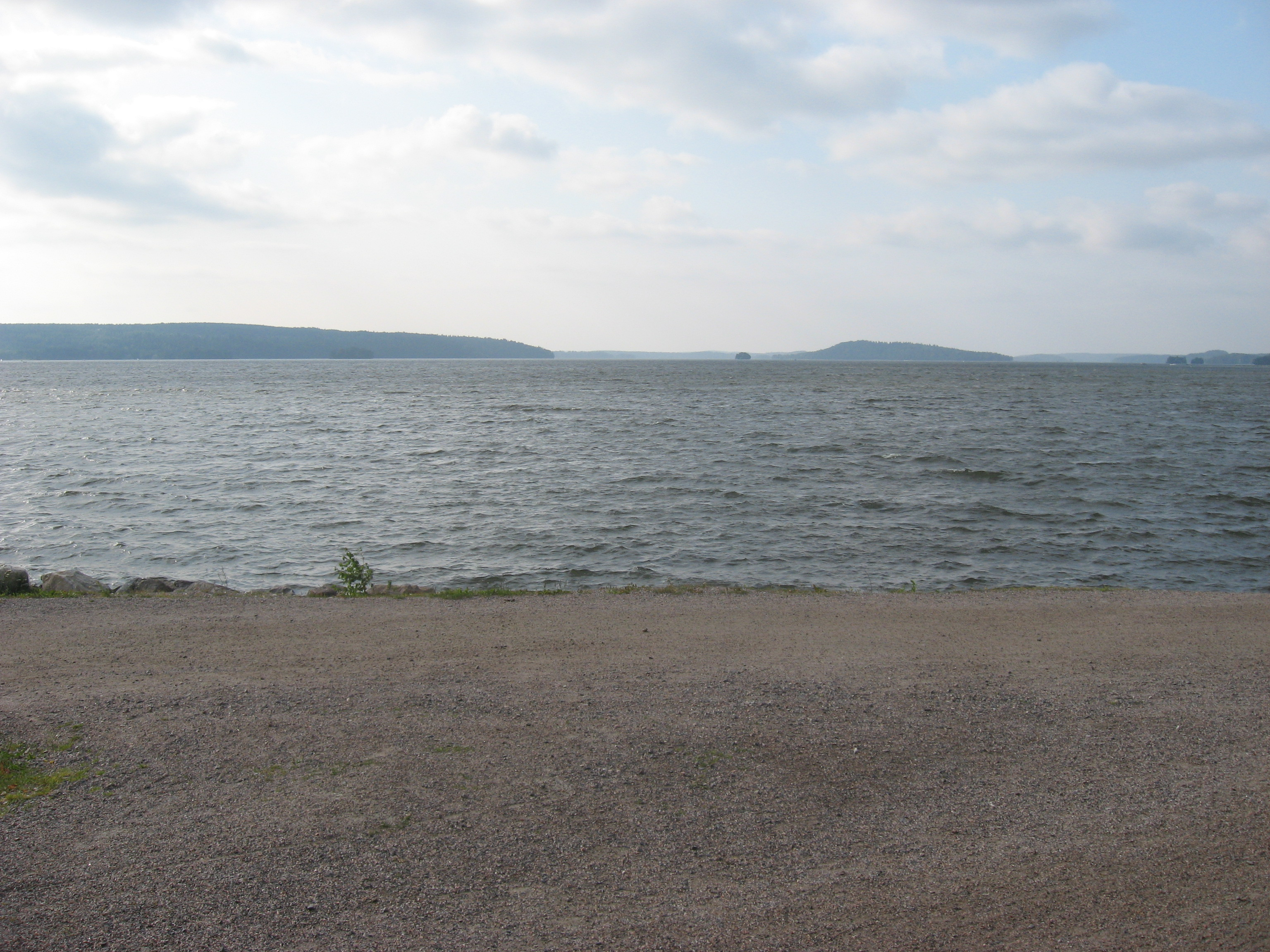
View from harbour

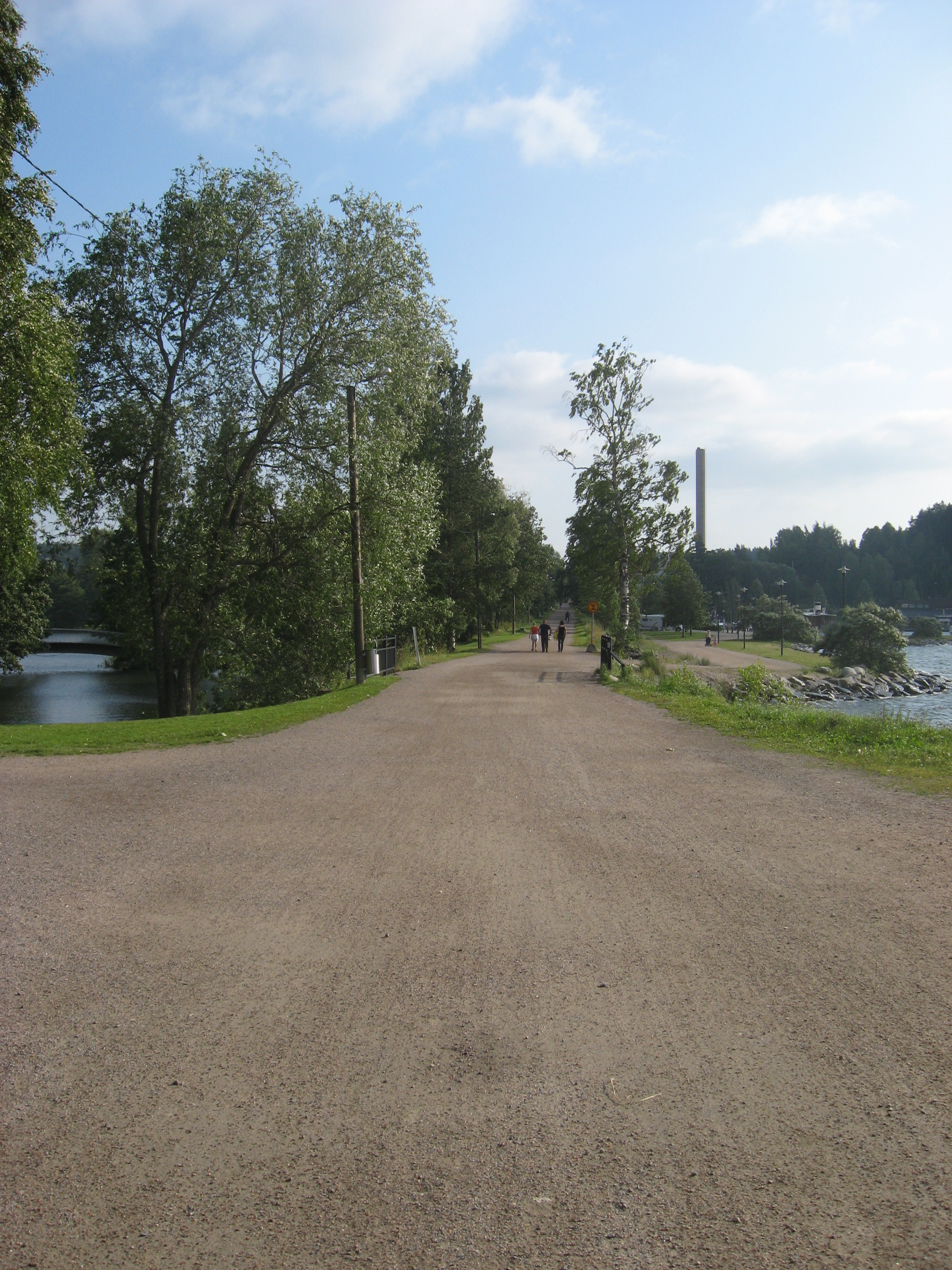
Road that separates Pikku-Vesijärvi from Vesijärvi

Vesijärvi (Finnish: ['ʋesijærʋi]) is a lake of 111 square kilometres (43 sq mi) near Lahti in southern Finland. It suffered severe effects of eutrophication in the 1960s and a restoration programme began in the 1970s; by the start of the 2020s, the lake's water quality and ecosystem had significantly improved.

The name of the lake means literally 'Water Lake'.

== Geography ==
The lake may be divided into several parts, the notable ones being:

- Enonselkä, the southern area
- Kajaanselkä, the northern area, the largest part
- Laitialanselkä, the southwestern area
- Kirkonselkä
- The Komonselkä strait connects Enonselkä with Kajaanselkä.

The lake is connected to the Pikku-Vesijärvi pond. It is also connected to Lake Päijänne northwards via the Vääksy canal.

== Cyanobacteria bloom remediation ==
- Biomanipulation is an approach that applies the top-down model of community organization to alter ecosystem characteristics.
- Ecologists used cyanobacteria blooms as an alternative to using chemical treatments.
- Lake Vesijärvi was polluted by city sewage and industrial wastewater until 1976, at which point pollution controls reduced these inputs. By 1986 massive blooms of cyanobacteria began occurring, as well as dense populations of roach, a fish that benefited from the pollution's mineral nutrients. Roach eat zooplankton that otherwise keep cyanobacteria in check. To remediate this problem, ecologists removed about a million of kilograms of fish, reducing roach to 20% of their former abundance, between 1989 and 1994, and stocked the lake with pike perch which eats roach. The water has since become clear, and the last cyanobacteria bloom was in 1989.

== In popular culture ==
- The ninth track on Geographer's 2012 album Myth is titled "Vesijärvi".

== See also ==
- Enonsaari – an island located in the lake.
