= Raija Jokinen =

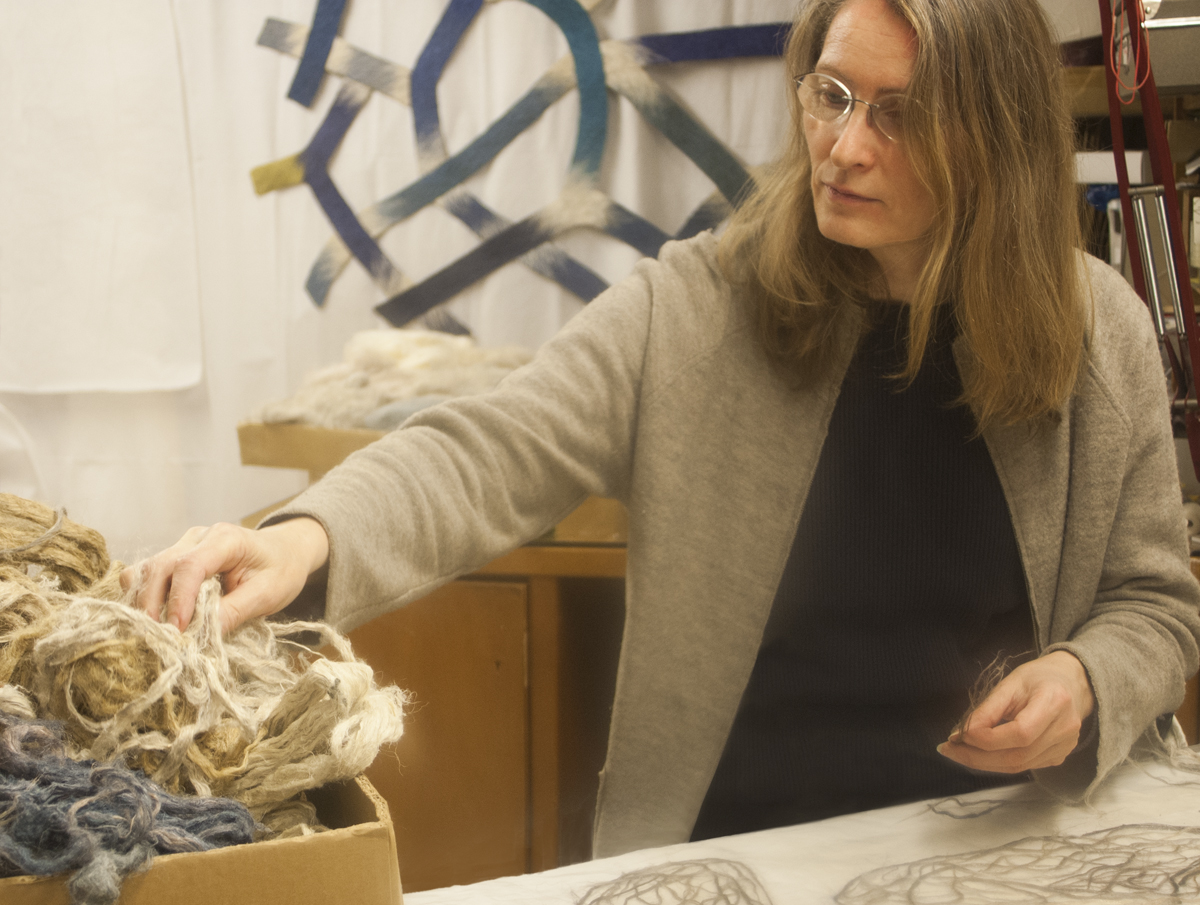
Raija Jokinen in 2014

Raija Jokinen (born 1960) is a Finnish visual artist and textile designer. Jokinen lives and works in Helsinki and Sipoo.

== History ==
Jokinen studied textile design at the University of Art and Design Helsinki (UIAH, former TaiK). She graduated with a master's degree in textile design in 1990. In her professional career Jokinen first used paper yarns and handmade paper for her art works, later she turned to flax, the linen fibre.

== Style ==
Jokinen created a unique technique of combining the use of fiber with sewing (machine embroidery). As a result, she creates works of arts that evoke a light and airy impression but are at the same time considerably durable. She often depicts parts of the human body such as blood vessels or nerves which are transformed into branches of plants and roots. Her method has been compared to drawing and sculpting, replacing the chisel or brush with sewing. Often, Jokinen's work deals with the individual's bodily and emotional inner condition.

== Prizes and exhibitions ==
- Jokinen is Finnish Textile Artist of the Year 2020.
- In 2019 she was awarded the Artist of the Year prize of the Sipoo community.
- She is holder of the Uusimaa province award Artist of the Year 2015.

Jokinen participated in numerous exhibitions inside and outside Finland, among others in the UK, France, Germany, the US and China. Her works are also on display in public spaces. In 2020 her 30th professional anniversary was celebrated with a retrospective in the Finnish city of Valkeakoski.
