= Rut Bryk =

Finnish ceramist (1916–1999)

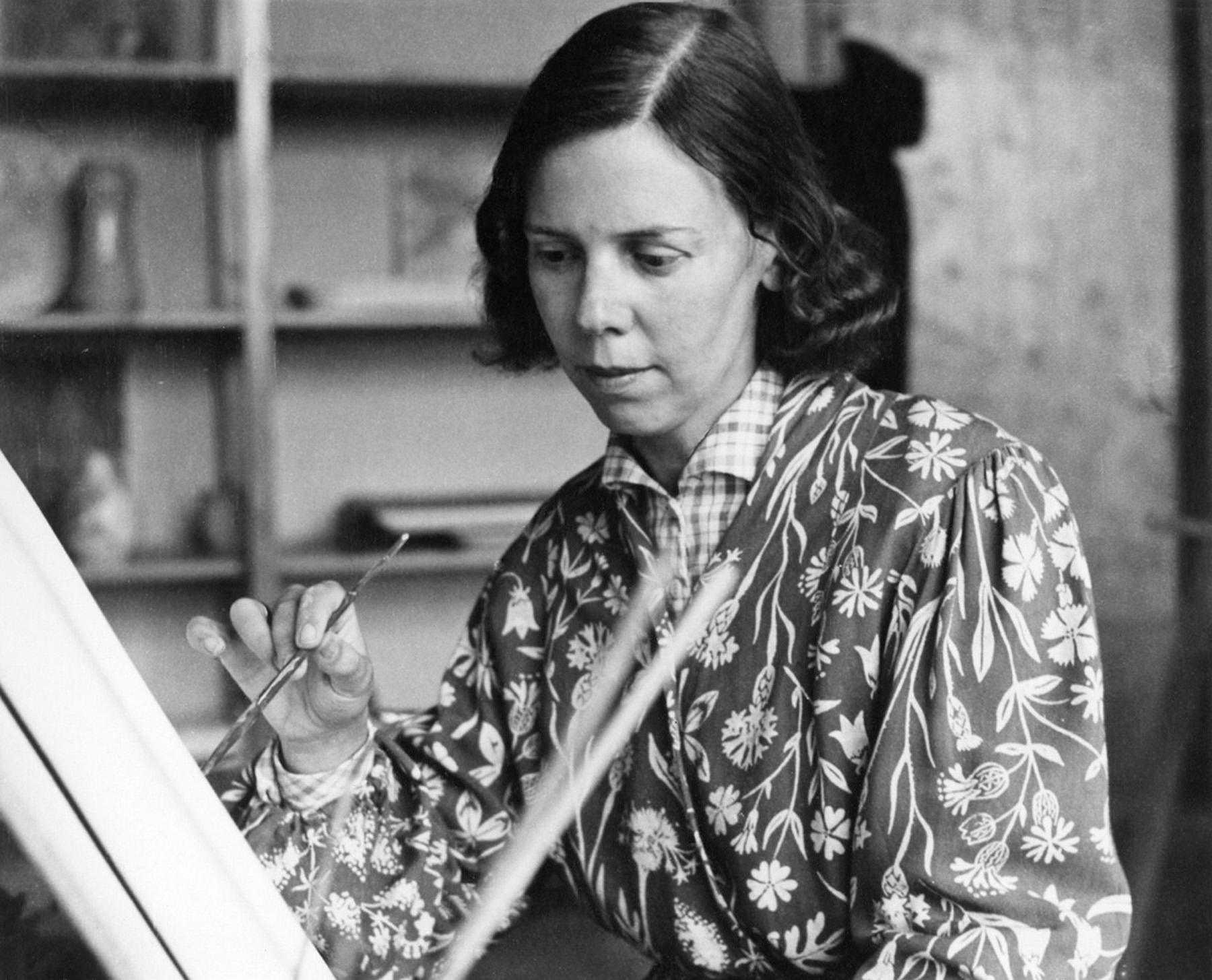
- Rut Bryk in the 1950s.
- Born: Linnea Rut Bryk; October 18, 1916; Stockholm
- Died: November 14, 1999 (aged 83); Helsinki
- Occupation: Ceramist
- Notable work: "City in the Sky" (1975) "Ice Flow" (1987–91)
- Spouse: Tapio Wirkkala

Linnea Rut Bryk (October 18, 1916, in Stockholm – November 14, 1999, in Helsinki) was a Finnish ceramist. Through her printmaking, textile design and ceramics, she successfully blurred the lines between art, craft and design. She is considered a key reformer of modern Finnish ceramic art.

== Education and early career ==
Bryk's parents were Felix Bryk, an Austrian entomologist specialising in butterflies, and Aino Mäkinen. Bryk studied graphic art at the Art and the Central School of Helsinki in 1936–1939 and was employed in 1942 by the Arabia Factory in Helsinki working with Birger Kaipiainen. Bryk's early works include graphical designs for greeting cards and book covers, as well as ceramic objects, such as colorful containers, trays and jewelry. In the mid-1940s she made faience plates characterized by pastel colors, and scenes of women in fancy hats, strolls in the park, and young courting. This turn to the idyllic has been interpreted as a response to the horrors of WWII The subjects were figurative, often naive, poetic and glowing in color.

== Late 1940s - 1950s ==
Her work from the late 1940s and 1950s leaves the earlier naivety behind for more complex and expressionistic work. Figures start to be constructed from color fields and raised relief: this way of working created a strong sense of contrast between glazed and unglazed sections. The subject matter also changes, and includes biblical motifs, Gothic and Renaissance architecture.

== 1960s onward ==
In the 1960s Bryk's work changes again, as she built large-scale ceramic mosaics meant for public spaces made on individual small tiles. Her previously narrative and figurative subject matter was replaced by geometrical abstraction. She made especially complex compositions, that make use of the three-dimensional nature of tiles and changes in glaze to create patterns with shadow, light and reflection.

Bryk's most famous pieces are the "City in the Sun" (1975), Helsinki City Hall's lobby staircase as well as the seven-paneled wall relief "Ice Flow" (1987–91), displayed in Mäntyniemi, the President of the Republic's official residence.

In the sixties, Bryk re-engaged with designing textiles and created a collection for Vaasan Puuvilla-Finlayson, a cotton manufacturer. The resultant fabrics were sold by the meter as well as bought as tablecloths, bed linen, and towels. Bryk thus showed she was comfortable working with both fine art and commercial objects and was skilled in many media.

== Awards ==
In 1951, Bryk scooped the first prize at the Milan Triennial. This was for tile designs. Bryk was awarded the Pro Finlandia medal in 1962 and the Finnish State Design Prize in 1974. She was awarded the Finnish White Rose Knight First Class in 1982 and received a Doctor of Philosophy honoris causa from the University of Helsinki in 1994.

== Personal life ==
Bryk married Tapio Wirkkala and together had two children: Sami Wirkkala (born 1948) and Maaria Wirkkala (born 1954). Sami is an interior designer and Maaria is a contemporary artist.

Bryk died in Helsinki in 1999 and is buried in Helsinki's Hietaniemi Cemetery in the same grave with her husband.
