= Esteri Tomula =

Finnish ceramic artist

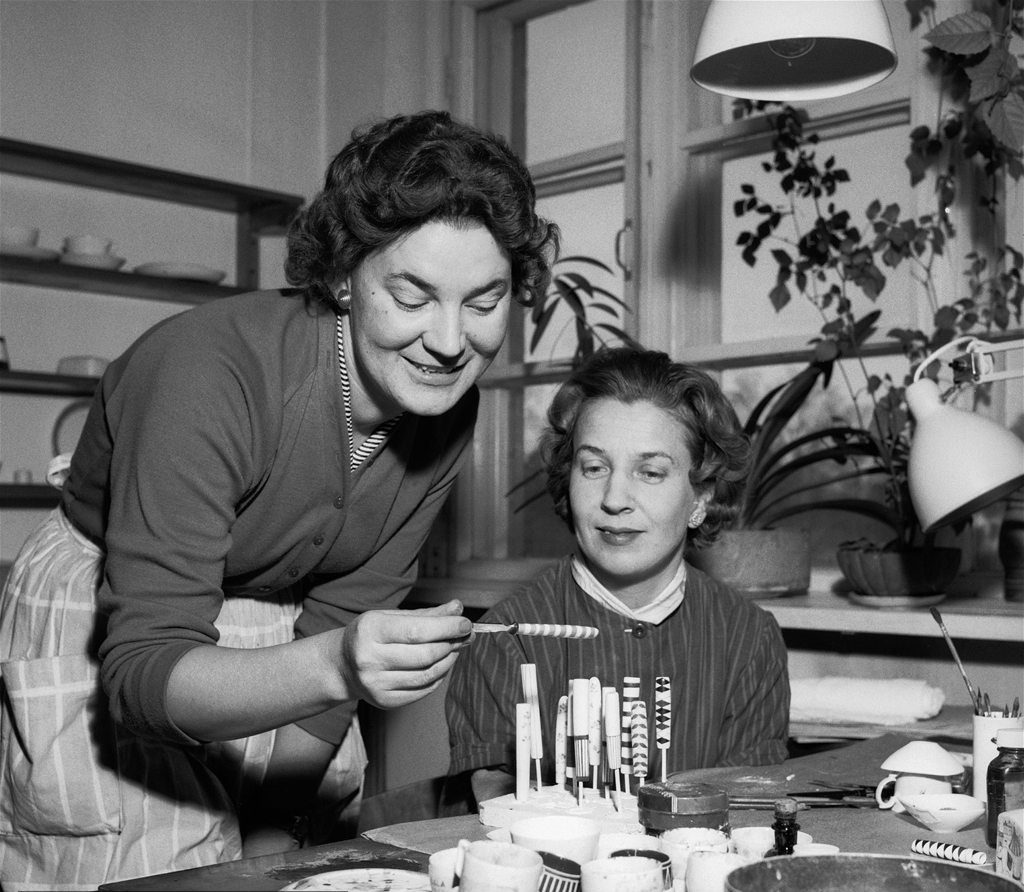
- Raija Uosikkinen and Esteri Tomula at the Arabian ceramics factory in 1957.
- Born: October 31, 1920; Helsinki
- Died: April 18, 1998 (aged 77); Helsinki
- Known for: ceramic design
- Notable work: Krokus, Pastoraali, Fennica

Esteri Tomula (October 31, 1920 in Helsinki, Finland – 1998) was a ceramic artist and designer who worked at the Arabia ceramics factory in Helsinki, Finland from 1947 to 1984.

Esteri Tomula is known for her decorative work often inspired by Finland's flora. Her most famous designs include the tableware series Pastoraali, Fennica and Krokus, and she often collaborated with Kaj Franck, a famous Finnish ceramic designer. Tomula used a special technique that combined printing and painting: the black outlines were first screen-printed and then filled with colorful, hand-painted details. The Esteri pattern, originally designed by Tomula in 1973, was relaunched in 2017 by Arabia to celebrate the 100th anniversary of the Republic of Finland. Her most collected design Krokus, an example of her signature silk-screen printing technique, was only in production for two years between 1978 and 1979.

According to her obituary, Esteri Tomula died in Helsinki in 1998 at the age of 77, after a three decade career at the Arabia ceramics factory. With her testament she established a foundation carrying her name. The foundation is set up to fund the purchase of domestic and international ceramics, in particular Tomula's own works, for the collection of the Design Museum, Helsinki.
