= Ulla Procopé =

Finnish artist (1921–1968)

Ulla Procopé-Nyman
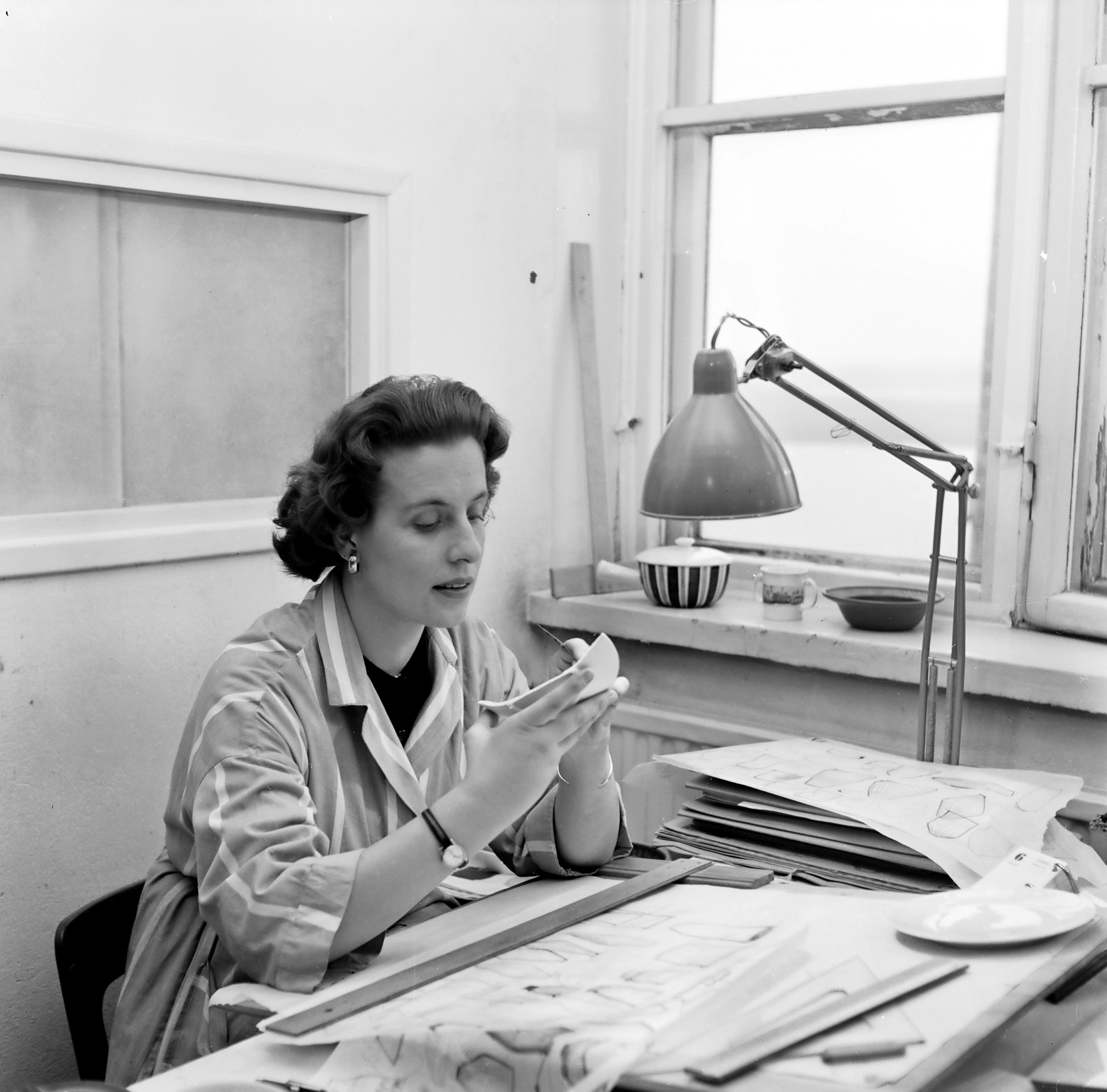
- Born: Ulrika Eleonora Matilda Procopé; 17 November 1921; Helsinki, Finland
- Died: 21 December 1968 (aged 47); Teneriffe, Spain
- Occupation: Ceramic designer

Ulrika (Ulla) Eleonora Matilda Procopé-Nyman (1921–1968) was a Finnish designer of ceramics. Procopé was one of the most prolific Finnish ceramic designers of the Golden Age of Finnish Design. Her designs were produced at large scale by the Arabia company in Finland.

Procopé's parents were Lieutenant Colonel Aleksander Fredrik Procopé (1876–1956), the commander of the Finnish White Guard (1919–1928), and his wife, Karin Maria née Spåre (1885–1924).

Procopé graduated from the School of Arts and Crafts (later known as the Aalto School of Arts) in Helsinki in 1948 and entered the Arabia ceramics factory directly after graduating.

She worked for Arabia until 1966 and specialised in creating practical ceramics designs for daily use with assured outlines and a range of carefully modulated glazes. She is noted for designing many series in stoneware, such as the Arabia Ruska (autumn colours), Anemone, Rosmarin, and Meri (sea) series.

Procopé's Valencia series, which was designed in 1960 and remained in production until 2002. The design was influenced by Southern European ceramics, which Procopé was introduced to since her youth. She lived in Southern France by the Spanish border as a young girl, and after retiring went to live in the Canary Islands until her death.

== Gallery ==
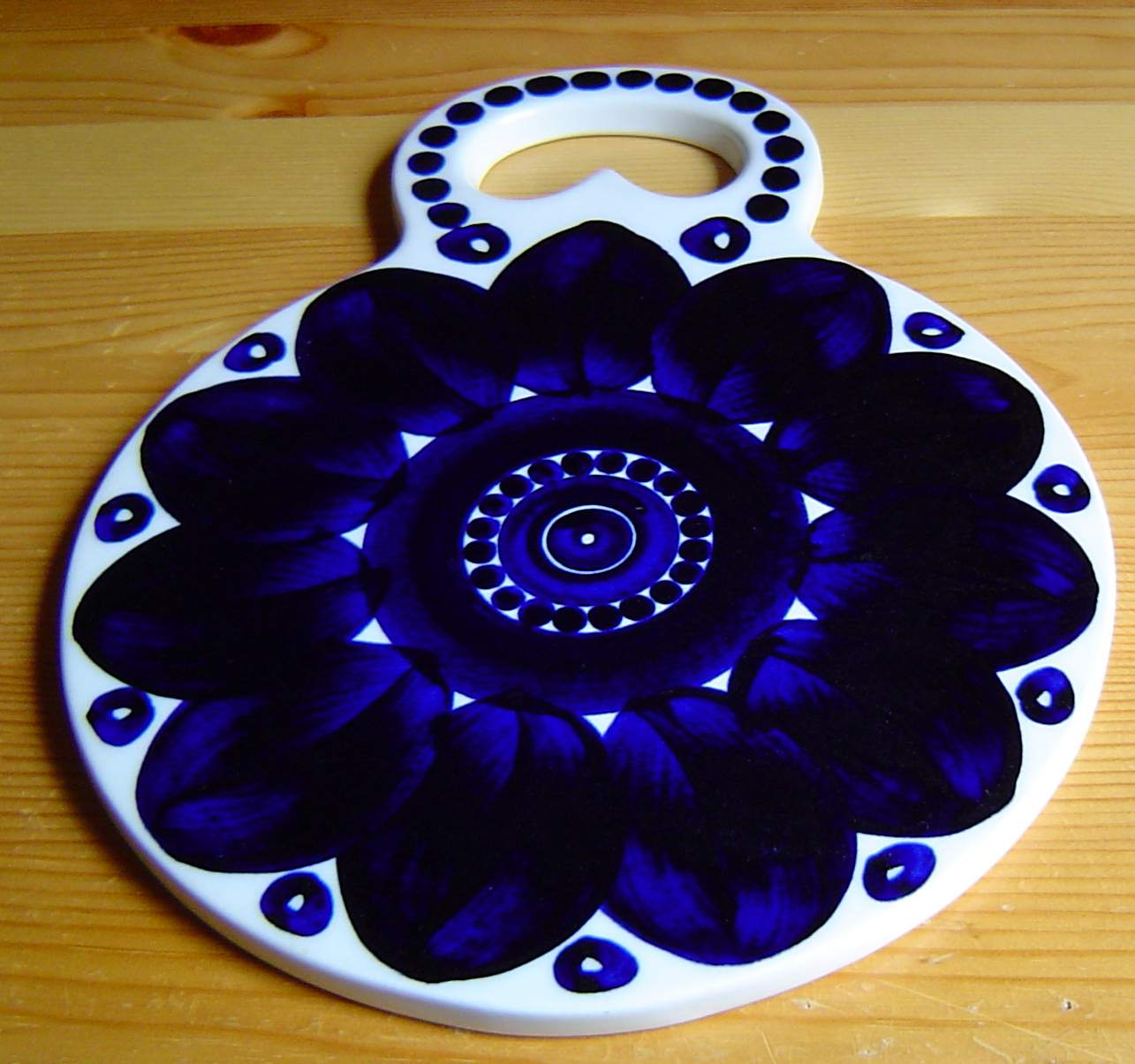
Trivet Valencia by Procopé

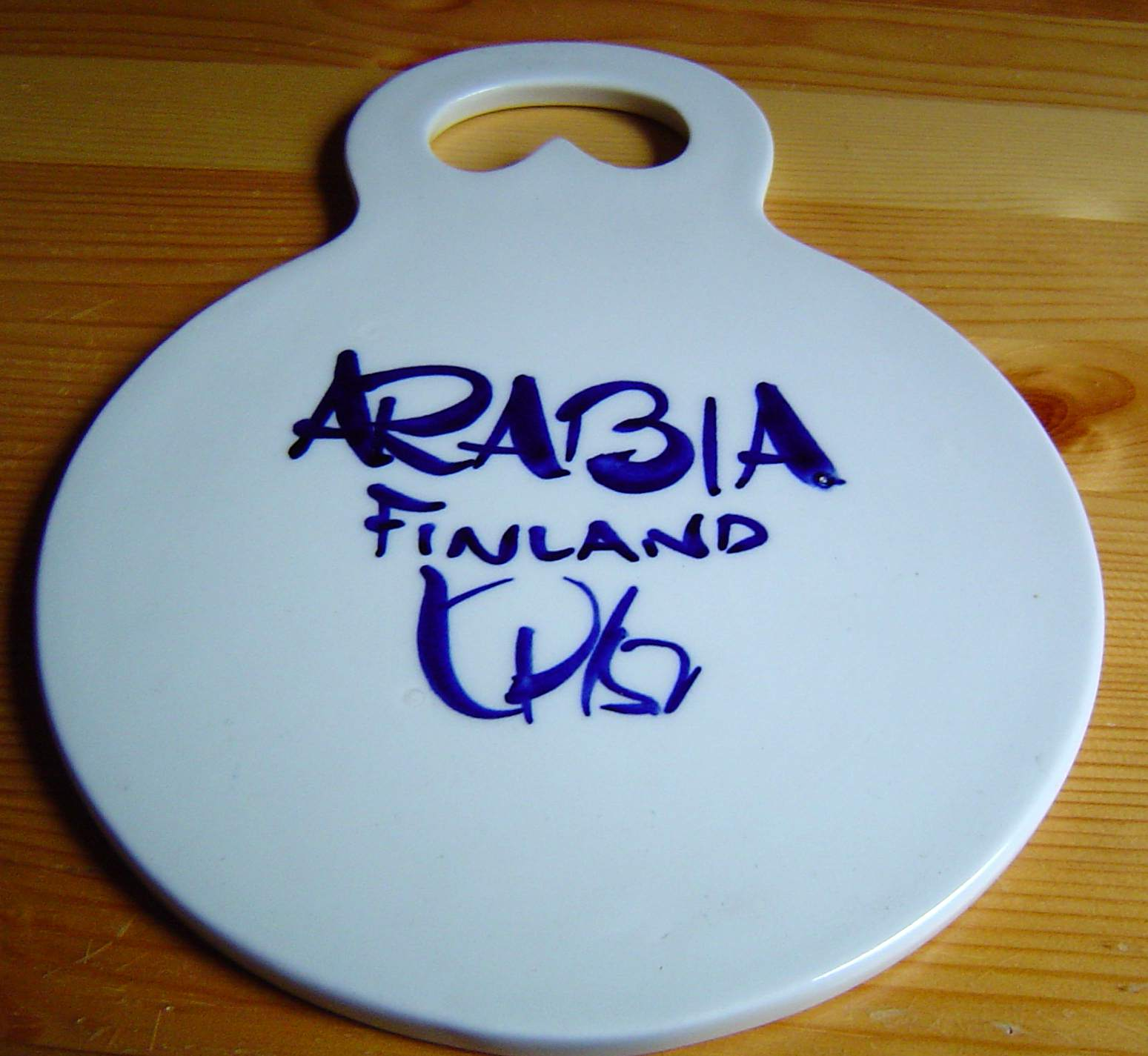
The Arabia company logo and maker's mark on the back of Trivet Valencia

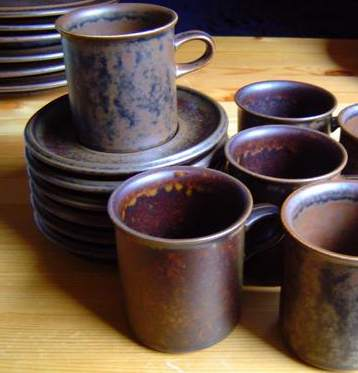
Ruska set designed by Procopé for the Arabia company
