= Enonsaari =

Island in Päijänne Tavastia, Finland

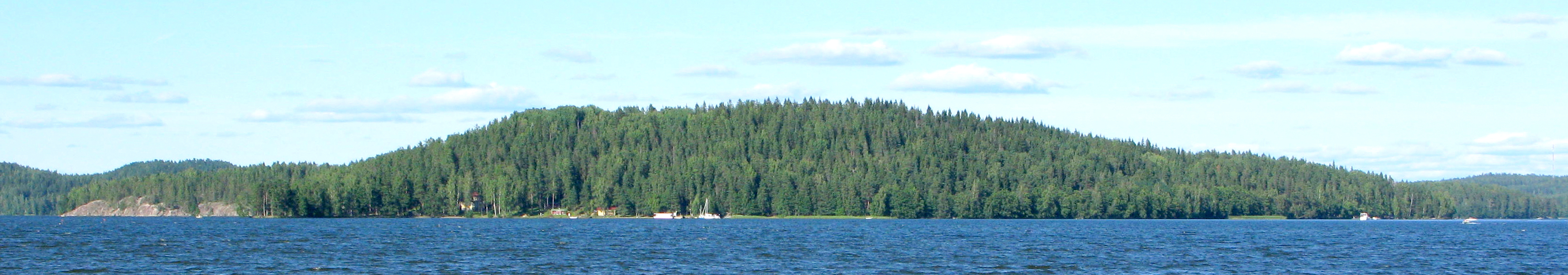
Enonsaari

Enonsaari (61°1′55″N 25°35′45″E) is an island on Enonselkä Basin, Lake Vesijärvi, in Lahti of southern Finland.

The island is a quite popular tourist spot in the summer. There is summer time cottages and large 1910 built cottage called Siesta.

Also there is a fireplace, shelter, and a café.

On weekends in the summer, a small passenger ferry goes from Lahti and from Messilä to Enonsaari.

In winter, Enonsaari is a quiet destination for skiers and ice-skaters.
