= Oppi Untracht =

American metalsmith

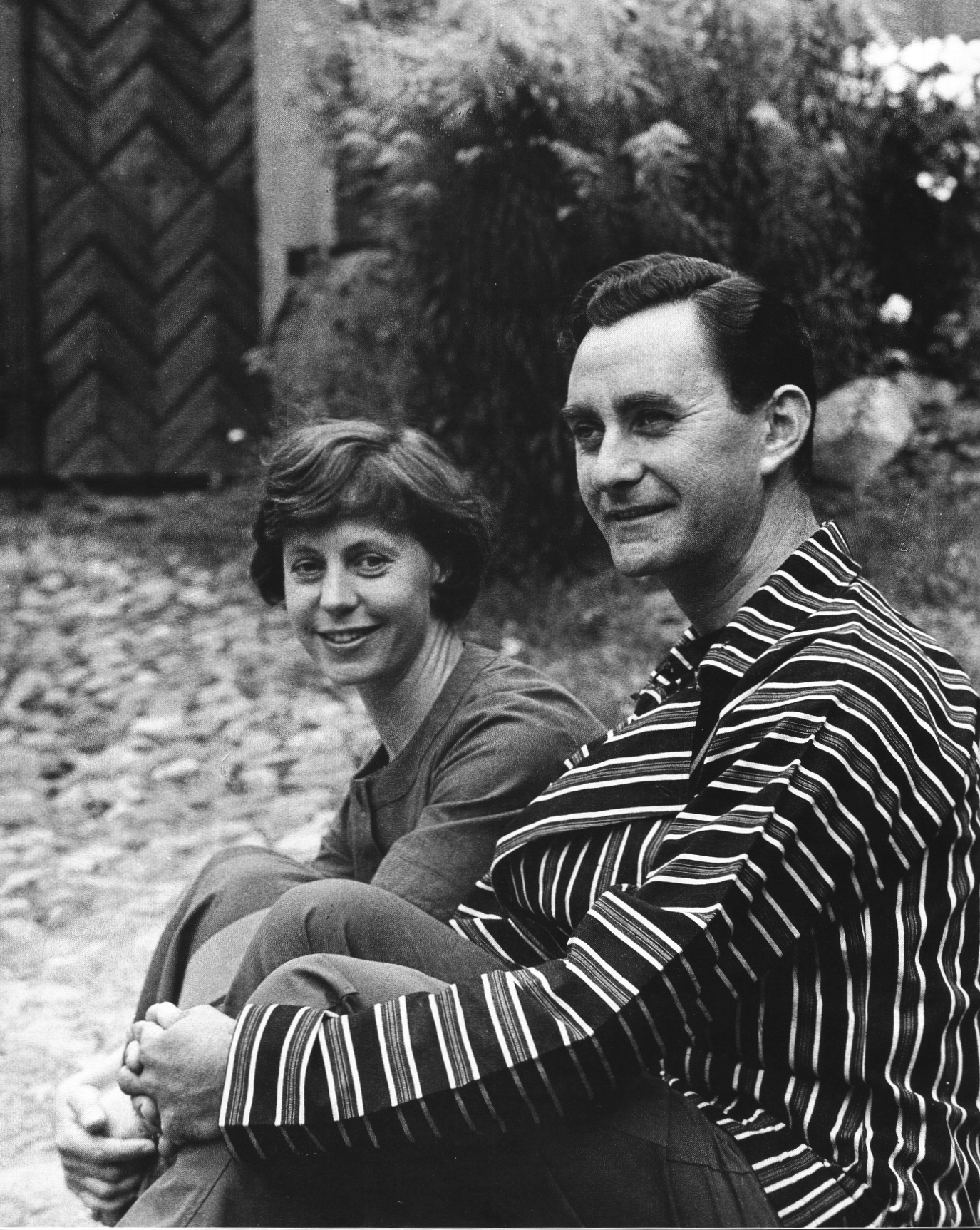
Oppi Untracht with his wife Saara Hopea in 1960.

Oppi A. J. Untracht (November 17, 1922 – July 5, 2008) was an American master metalsmith, educator, and writer.

== Biography ==
Born in New York City, Untracht obtained his Master of Fine Arts at Columbia University in 1947. Originally trained as a photographer, he studied Indian arts and crafts and later became an expert on the jewelry of India and Nepal. In addition to being an honorary member of the Society of North American Goldsmiths, in 2000 Untracht was awarded a Lifetime American Achievement Award on behalf of the American Craft Council. His first book, Metal Techniques for Craftsmen is considered a standard training textbook for silversmiths.

Untracht married Finnish designer Saara Hopea, and moved permanently to Finland in 1967. Untracht died in Porvoo in 2008.

== Bibliography ==
- Metal Techniques for Craftsmen (1968). ISBN 0-7091-0723-4
- Jewelry Concepts and Technology (1982). ISBN 0-385-04185-3
- Saara Hopea Untracht: Elämä ja työ — Life and Work (1988). ISBN 951-0-14377-4
- Traditional Jewelry of India (1997). ISBN 0-500-28749-X
