= Birger Kaipiainen =

Finnish ceramist and designer

Professori Birger Kaipiainen
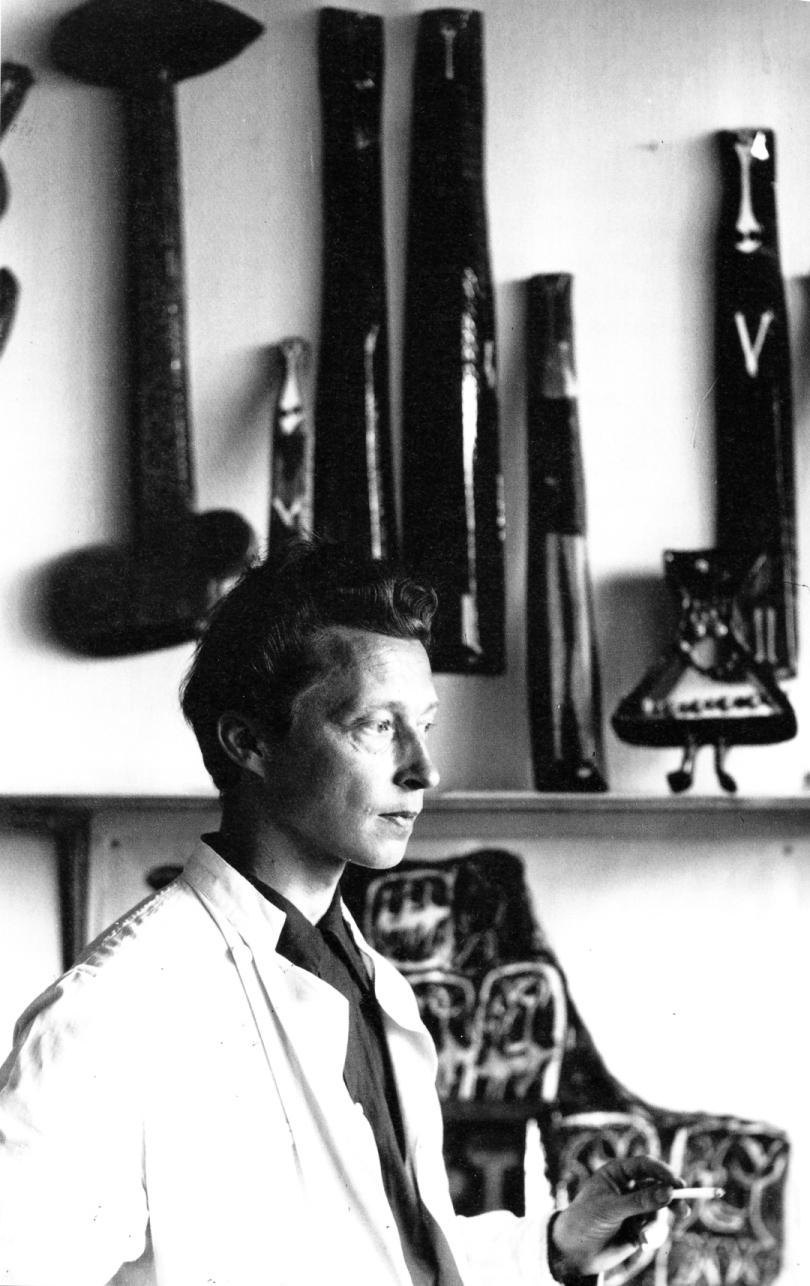
- Kaipiainen in 1953
- Born: Birger Johannes Kaipiainen; 1 July 1915; Pori, Finland
- Died: 18 July 1988 (aged 73); Helsinki
- Occupations: Ceramist, Designer

Birger Johannes Kaipiainen (1 July 1915 – 18 July 1988) was a Finnish ceramist and designer. He is one of the most successful and well-known ceramic artists in Finland.

Kaipiainen graduated from the School of Arts and Crafts (later known as the Aalto School of Arts of Helsinki. After that he went to work for Finnish ceramics company Arabia in 1937, and later in 1954 for their Swedish sister company Rörstrand. Kaipiainen worked as a designer for Arabia for over fifty years. As a child he suffered from Polio and was consequently unable to use a pottery wheel. It was said that his illness heightened his artistic sensitivity.

Kaipiainen was nicknamed "the king of decorators", for his nostalgic, romantic and highly decorative ceramic designs, at a time when minimalism was the prevailing trend in Finnish ceramics. He is known for repeatedly using the same signature nature inspired motifs, such as violets and curlews. His most famous designs were made at the Arabia ceramics factory. For example, the Paratiisi (Paradise) series, designed in 1969, which is still in production. Paratiisi was one of the first silkscreen printed series made by Arabia. Another noted design by Kaipiainen, the Sunnuntai (Sunday) series designed in 1971 was brought back into production by the Arabia company in 2019.

== Awards ==
- Grand Prix, Milano 1951
- Pro Finlandia medal 1963
- Grand Prix, Montreal world exhibition 1967
- Title of professor 1977
- Prince Eugen medal 1982
