= Saara Hopea =

Finnish designer (1925–1982)

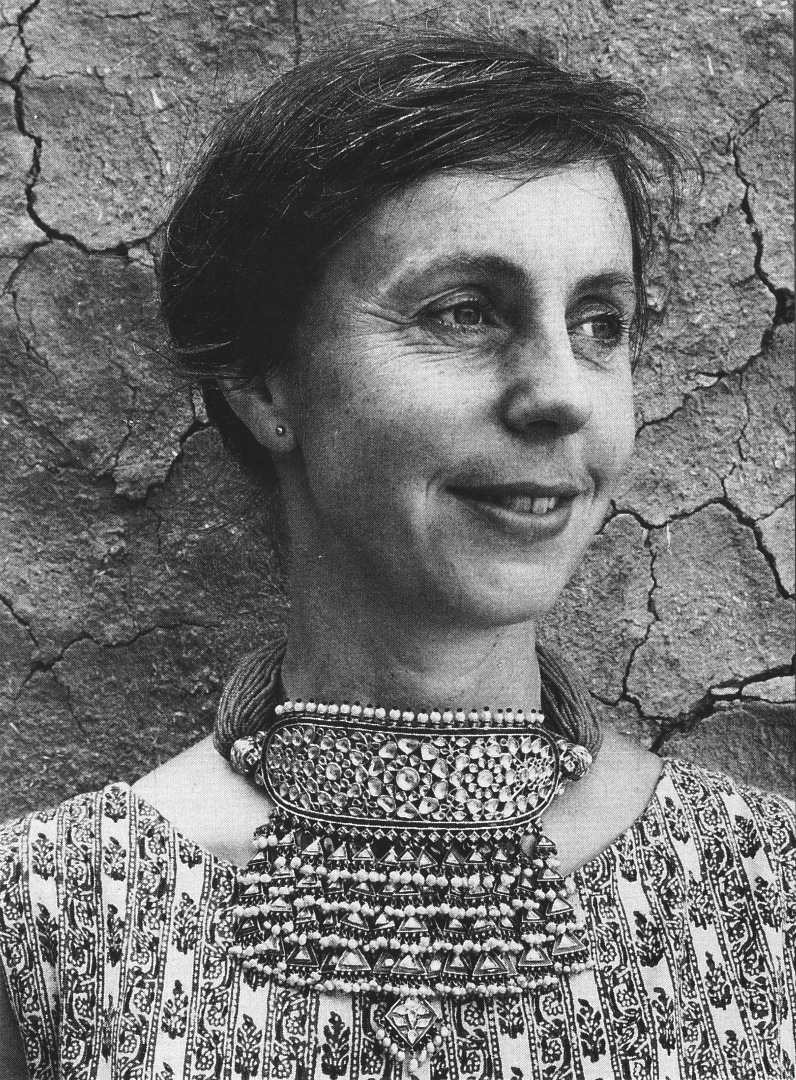
Hopea in 1967

Saara Elisabet Hopea-Untracht (1925 –1982) was a Finnish designer whose work included glassware and jewellery.

== Personal life and education ==
Hopea was born on 26 August 1925 in Porvoo, Uusimaa, Finland. She was the granddaughter of goldsmith Samuel Mika Westerlund, her mother was a talented craftswoman, and her father Ossian Hopea was manager of the Westerlund goldsmiths business. She studied from 1943 to 1946 at the Central School of Industrial Design or School of Applied Arts, now part of Aalto University School of Arts, Design and Architecture, in Helsinki, and gained a degree in interior design.

She married Oppi Untracht, an American metalsmith, writer and educator, in 1960, after meeting him when he visited Finland in 1954. She died in Porvoo on 25 June 1982.

== Work ==
Hopea worked in furniture design from 1946 to 1948 and then joined metalsmith Paavo Tynell's company from 1948 to 1952. She then joined Nuutajärvi glassworks where she designed glassware, and her work "epitomized the minimalist ideal of 1950s Finnish style, which had been influenced by the Bauhaus design philosophy." After her father died in 1948 she began to design silver for his shop in Porvoo.

After she married Untracht the couple moved to New York and she started to work in enamel. "By overfiring transparent enamels on copper, she was able to achieve results that gave the work a spontaneous, painterly look with intense colors and great depth.", and she sold many pieces through exclusive shops. The couple traveled in Nepal and India for four years, studying, photographing and collecting local metalwork and jewellery; Untracht published his Traditional Jewelry of India in 1997. They returned to Porvoo in 1967, and Hopea's work thereafter included silversmithing, textile design, and enamelling. Her jewellery has been described as "a tranquil contemporary statement of the Scandinavian esthetic."

As of 2024 the British Museum holds 28 of her works, and the Museum of Modern Art 11 items.

In 1988 her husband published Saara Hopea-Untracht. Life and Work.
