= Olavi Lanu =

Finnish sculptor

Olavi Lanu (10 July 1925 Viipurin maalaiskunta (former municipality of Finland) – 11 May 2015 Lahti) was a Finnish sculptor.

He took part to Venice Biennale in 1978 and had more publicity. Lanu's sculptures can be seen in Lanu-puisto. He used to use many kinds of materials like wood, copper and concrete, but tried to make surfaces to mimic natural forms, for example moss, bark, and sand.

Olavi Lanu has also made the so called land art.

== Some works ==
- Elämää suomalaismetsässä (1978)
- Kaari
- Keko
- Lehmus
- Rankakasa
- The three stones (1985)
