= Aalto University School of Arts, Design and Architecture =

University in Finland

Coordinates: 60°12′34″N 024°58′37″E

- Aalto-yliopiston taiteiden ja suunnittelun korkeakoulu Aalto-universitetets högskola för konst, design och arkitektur
- Motto: Pro Arte Utili (Latin)
- Motto in English: For useful arts
- Established: 1871
- Dean: Tuomas Auvinen
- Students: Approx 2000
- Location: Espoo, Finland
- Campus: (Finland) Otaniemi, Espoo
- Website: arts.aalto.fi

The old Arabia ceramics factory where part of the Aalto University School of Arts, Design and Architecture was located until July 2018

Aalto University School of Arts, Design and Architecture (Finnish: Aalto-yliopiston taiteiden ja suunnittelun korkeakoulu; Swedish: Aalto-universitetets högskola för konst, design och arkitektur) was formed of two separate schools: the faculty of architecture (previously part of the Helsinki University of Technology) and the University of Art and Design Helsinki (UIAH, known in Finnish as TaiK). TaiK, founded in 1871, was the largest art university in the Nordic countries. The university awards the following academic degrees: Bachelor of Science in Technology, Architect, Bachelor of Arts, Master of Arts, and Doctor of Arts.

The university is known for its research projects and industrial collaborations. During the rectorship of Yrjö Sotamaa the university was active in integrating design into Finnish innovation and business networks. This eventually led to the decision to merge TaiK together with Helsinki University of Technology (TKK) and the Helsinki School of Economics (HSE) into a new charter university, Aalto University, which started in January 2010.

In the global QS World University Rankings in 2021, the Aalto University School of Arts, Design and Architecture was placed 6th in the art and design subject area. In the field of architecture & built environment Aalto was ranked 42nd.

Aalto University School of Arts, Design and Architecture is a founding member of the Cumulus Association, a global association of higher education institutions in the fields of art, design and media.

== Organization ==
Degree programmes are organized under five departments:

- Department of Architecture
- Department of Art and Media, including the Aalto Media Lab
- Department of Design
- Department of Film, Television and Scenography

== Notable alumni ==
The school in its earlier incarnation as Taik educated many of the household names of Finnish art, design and cinema. Many alumni, such as Tapio Wirkkala and Kaj Franck have earned international acclaim for their work. The school of architecture, when part of Helsinki University of Technology, produced the foremost names in the history of modern Finnish architecture, most notably Signe Hornborg, Eliel Saarinen, Alvar Aalto – after whom the new university is named – Viljo Revell, Reima Pietilä, Timo Penttilä and Juhani Pallasmaa. Internationally acclaimed Marxist theorist and activist Franco Berardi defended his dissertation in the School of Arts, Design and Architecture in 2014. Raija Jokinen, Finnish Textile Artist of the Year 2020, graduated with a master's degree in textile design in 1990.

== Väre building ==
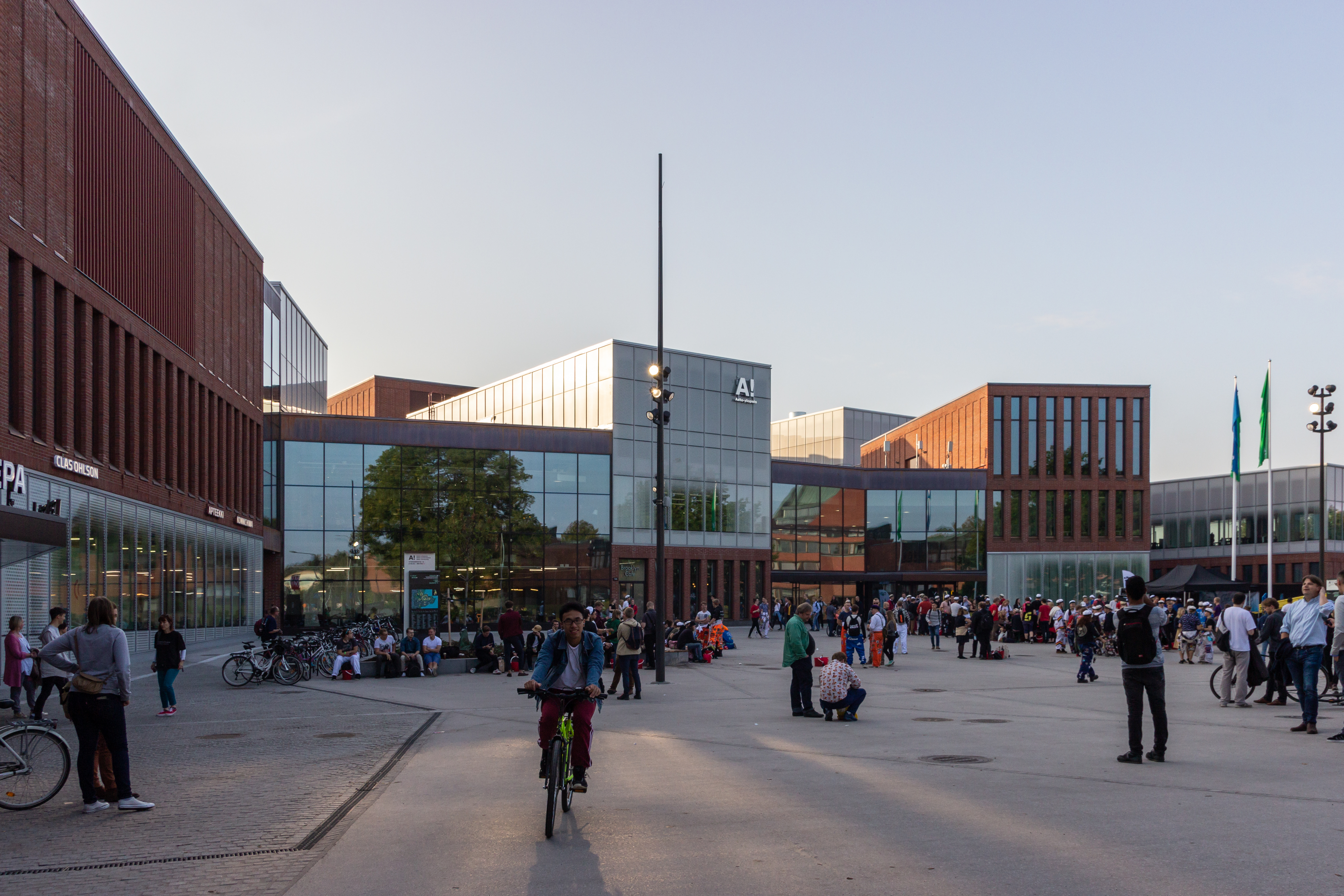
Korkeakouluaukio plaza and the Väre building of the School of Arts, Design and Architecture at the Aalto University's Campus.

Officially opening to the public in September 2018 the School of Arts, Design and Architecture moved from Arabia Campus, located in the historical building of the Arabia ceramics factory, to the new Väre building in Otaniemi. Its construction began in late 2015 and was completed in summer 2018. The new building block also houses the metro station and a shopping centre.

== See also ==
- List of universities in Finland
- Finnish education system
