= Maija Isola =

Finnish textile designer (1927–2001)

- At work, sitting cross-legged, paintbrush and paintpot in hand
- Born: 15 March 1927; Arolammi, Riihimäki, Finland
- Died: 3 March 2001 (aged 73); Riihimäki, Finland
- Occupation: Textile designer
- Known for: Unikko and other Marimekko patterns
- Spouses: Georg Leander; Jaakko Somersalo; Jorma Tissari

Maija Sofia Isola (15 March 1927 – 3 March 2001) was a Finnish designer of printed textiles, and the creator of over 500 patterns, including Unikko ("Poppy"). The bold, colourful prints she created as the head designer of Marimekko made the Finnish company famous in the 1960s. She also had a successful career as a visual artist.

Undisputedly the most famous textile designer... at Marimekko

Isola exhibited across Europe, including at the Brussels World Fair and the Milan Triennale, and in the USA. Retrospectives of her work have been held at the Design Museum in Helsinki, the Victoria and Albert Museum, London, the Design Museum, Copenhagen, the Slovene Ethnographic Museum, Ljubljana, and the Minneapolis Institute of Arts. Products featuring her prints are still being sold at Marimekko.

She lived and worked in Finland for most of her life, but spent some years in France, Algeria and the United States. She was married three times. Her daughter, Kristina Isola, also became a Marimekko designer, collaborating with her mother for some time. Her granddaughter, Emma, also designs for the company.

== Biography ==
=== Early life ===
Isola was born to Mauno and Toini Isola, the youngest of their three daughters. Mauno was a farmer who wrote song lyrics, including a popular Finnish Christmas carol. The girls lived on the family farm and helped out with agricultural work in the summer. They made paper dolls with elegant dresses for their homemade paper dollhouse, which had elaborately decorated interiors.

Isola studied painting at the Helsinki Central School of Industrial Arts. In 1945, as the Second World War came to an end, her life changed radically: her father died, and she became pregnant. On 22 July 1945 she married the commercial artist Georg Leander; their daughter Kristina was born in January 1946.

In 1948, she went to Oslo, visiting the Van Gogh exhibition and seeing the Edvard Munch paintings there. She was inspired by a display of classical era pots at the Oslo Museum of Craft and Design to create her Amfora ("Amphora") print. The marriage with Leander did not last long, and by 1949 she was travelling Europe with the painter Jaakko ("Jaska") Somersalo, who became her second husband. He taught her woodcut printing and inspired her to paint. They divorced in 1955.

=== Marimekko ===
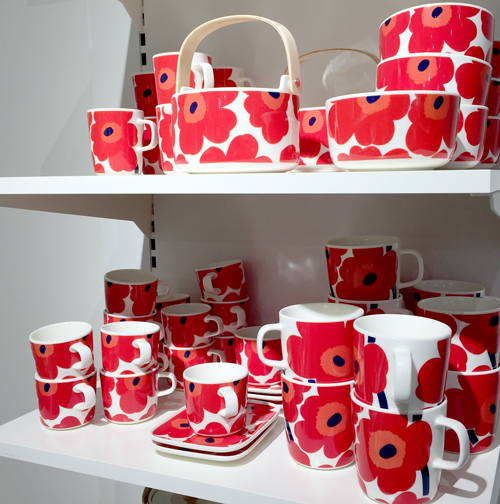
Marimekko dishes featuring Isola's 1964 Unikko poppy pattern

Her student-era work, including Amfora, was spotted in 1949 by Marimekko's founder, Armi Ratia. Ratia hired Isola to work for Printex, the forerunner of Marimekko. She became the principal textile designer for Marimekko, creating some eight to ten patterns every year.

Between 1957 and 1963, Isola created her first series of works on a single theme, Luonto (Nature). It consisted of some 30 designs, based on pressed plants, which her daughter Kristina had started collecting at age 11. In 1958, she began another series, Ornamentti (Ornament), based on Slavic folk art. It, too, included about 30 designs, and made her famous. That year, she won the Ducat Prize for artists under 40.

In 1959 she married the judge Jorma Tissari. He was a wealthy art lover with a spacious home in the centre of Helsinki. When Isola wanted more creative freedom from Ratia's control, Tissari negotiated with Marimekko to give her a new contract that allowed her more creative freedom.

Page from Isola's "Pattern Books", showing the hand-drawn construction of her 1968 textile pattern Lovelovelove and her handwritten annotations. The pattern books continued to serve as production manuals after her death.

The collaboration between Isola and Ratia was an "unusual creative power game" characterised by "vitality and inventiveness" rather than a harmonious understanding. The tone for this was set when, in 1964, Isola "provocatively" defied Ratia's professed hatred of floral patterns by painting the famous Unikko (Poppy) pattern in bold pink, red and black on white; the pattern came to define the brand and has been in production ever since. It was one of some eight floral designs that Ratia chose from Isola's portfolio in that period.

From 1965 to 1967, Isola worked on the theme of sun and sea, creating at least nine designs that were adopted by Marimekko, including Albatrossi (Albatross), Meduusa (Jellyfish), and Osteri (Oyster). Her patterns were, by now, being widely reproduced. To facilitate this process and to keep the patterns accurate, Isola maintained a set of "pattern books". These were handwritten exercise books containing precise details of her pattern repeats. Each one, such as her 1968 Lovelovelove, was drawn to scale on a pattern book page, coloured, and annotated with the names of the colours to be used. The books also recorded the size of the actual repeat and details of print orders. The books continued to be used as production guides in the decades after her death.

In 1970 she travelled on her own to Paris to get away from her marriage and family commitments. There, she had a love affair with the Egyptian scholar Ahmed Al-Haggagi. He encouraged her to work on Arabian patterns, sketching for her the basis of her Poppy (not the same as Unikko). Her Arabian-inspired patterns of this period include Kuningatar, Naamio, Sadunkertoja, Tumma, and Välly. In 1971, she separated from Tissari, realising that she preferred to live alone. She spent three years in Algeria, taking a lover named Muhamed.

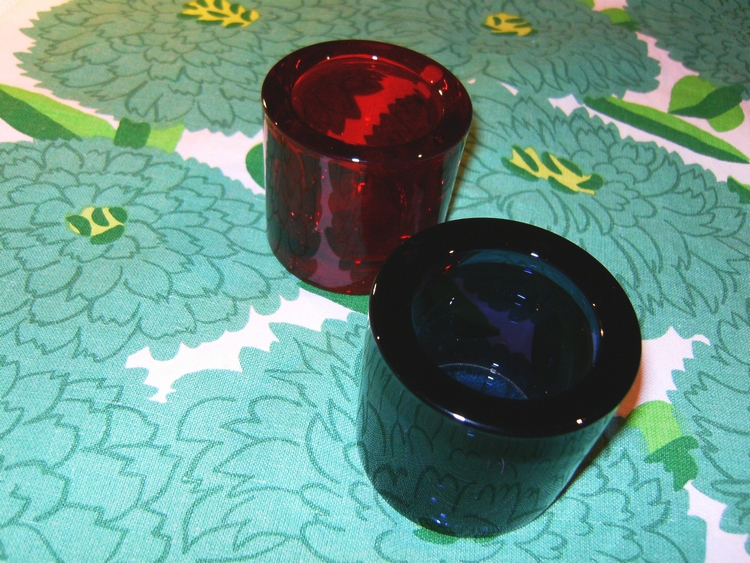
Tablecloth in Isola's 1974 Primavera pattern (with candleholders designed by Heikki Orvola)

In 1974, Isola designed the popular pattern Primavera, consisting of stylized Marigold flowers; this has since been printed in many different colours for tablecloths, plates and other items. In 1976 she returned to Paris, working with Al-Haggagi on a series of Egyptian-inspired prints including Niili (Nile), Nubia, and Papyrus. The next year, she accompanied Al-Haggagi to Boone, North Carolina where he was a lecturer. She spent the year painting, walking, and doing yoga, inspired by the scenery of the Appalachian Mountains, which she said reminded her of her home town, Riihimäki. She made some designs, but found it hard to sell any in the American market, as there were few factories that could print fabrics to her specifications.

On returning to Finland, 160 of her works, including paintings and sketches but not her print designs, were displayed at a retrospective exhibition in a Helsinki gallery in 1979.

From 1980 to 1987, Isola designed patterns for Marimekko jointly with her daughter, Kristina. They worked in their own studios, in Helsinki in the winter, in Kaunismäki in the summer. Kristina became one of Marimekko's chief designers; she had joined Marimekko when she was 18. During her 40-year career with Marimekko, Maija Isola created a "staggering" 500 prints for the company. Among the best-known are Kivet (Stones) and Kaivo (Well); they continue to sell in the 21st century.

=== Retirement ===
From 1987, when she retired, Isola worked on painting rather than textiles, until her death on 3 March 2001. Her designs, and Marimekko, went into eclipse. In 1991, the new head of Marimekko, Kirsti Paakkanen successfully relaunched Isola's Fandango, but it was not until the late 1990s that Marimekko again became widely popular. Its renewed fortunes were based on "classic" Isola patterns from the 1950s and 1960s.

== Reception ==
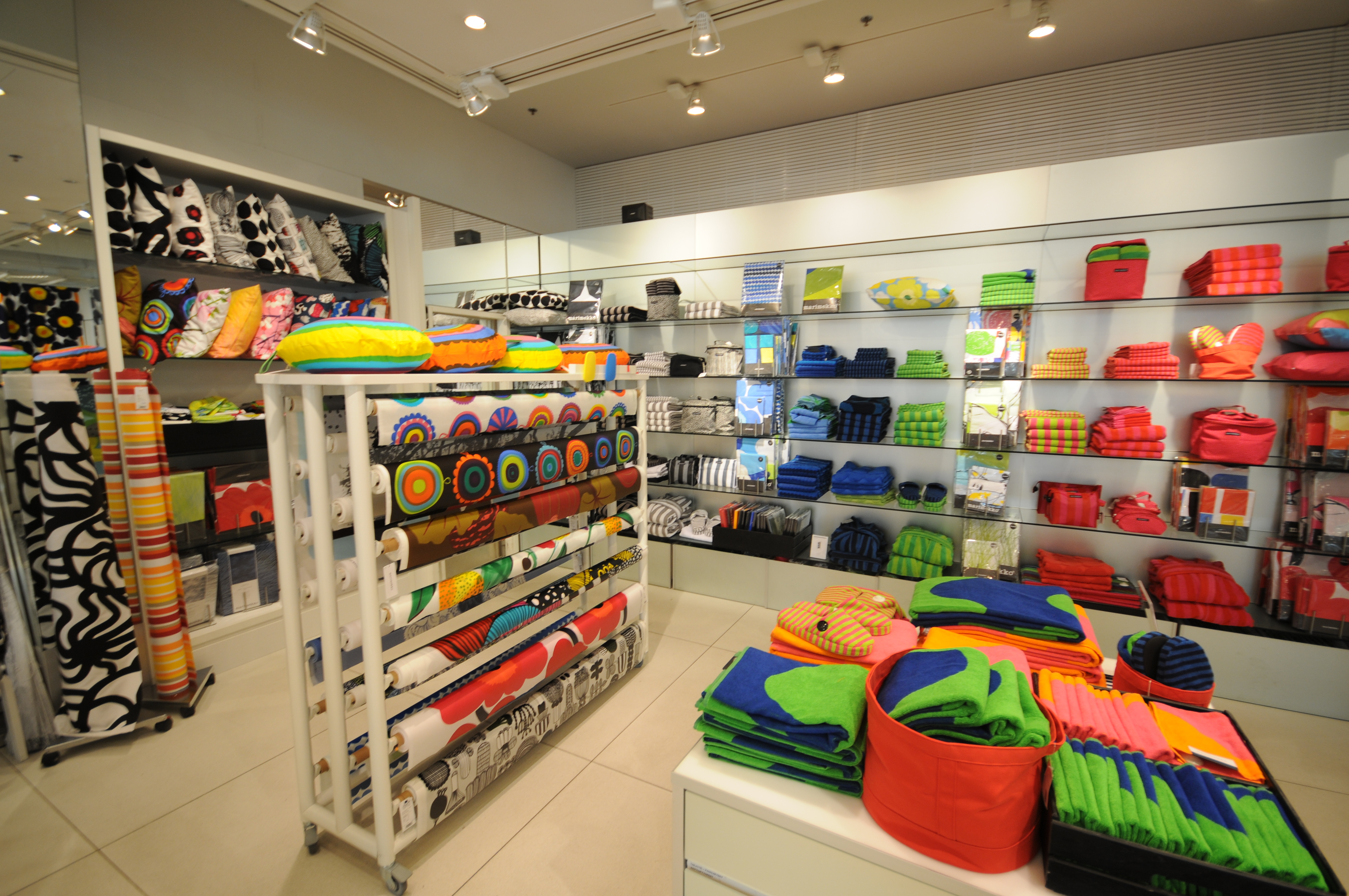
The glowing colours and bold patterns in Marimekko owe much to Maija Isola's design and example. A roll of Unikko is second from the bottom of the fabric stand; a vertical roll of the black-and-white Joonas (Jonah) stands at the far left.

According to FinnStyle, Isola was "undisputedly the most famous textile designer to have existed at Marimekko", and she "created over 500 prints during her long and colorful employment." Her work enabled the company to become a world-leading international fashion trendsetter.

Ivar Ekman, writing in The New York Times, quotes Marianne Aav, director of the Helsinki Design Museum: "What we understand as the Marimekko style is very much based on what Maija Isola was doing". Ekman comments "The range of prints that Isola produced for Marimekko is astounding", as the patterns span "minimalist geometric", "toned-down naturalistic" and "explosion of colors".

Marion Hume, writing in Time Magazine, explains that Isola "was able to mastermind an astonishing range, from the intricate and folkloric Ananas (1962)--which remains one of the most popular prints for the home market—to the radically simple, dramatically enlarged, asymmetrical Unikko poppy (1964), originally in red and in blue, which may be one of the most widely recognized prints on earth."

According to Tamsin Blanchard, writing in The Observer, "The designs of Maija Isola – one of the company's [most] original and longest-standing designers – have stood the test of time." Blanchard describes Isola's 1972 Wind design "with its feathery organic tree skeletons in silhouette" as "timeless", her 1957 Putinotko as a "spiky black-and-white print", also discussing her 1963 work, Melon, and her 1956 work, Stones.

Hannah Booth, writing in The Guardian, explains that Marimekko's founder, Armi Ratia, "recruited Maija Isola, the first and most important of many young female designers, to create original prints". She describes Isola as unconventional, leaving her daughter Kristina "to grow up with her grandmother so she could travel the world to find inspiration for her textiles". Booth quotes Finnish novelist Kaari Utrio as saying Isola was "a dangerously original character"; she "belonged to a trailblazing generation" which enabled young women to move freely into the arts.

Lesley Jackson, in a chapter titled Op, Pop, and Psychedelia, writes that "from Finland the exuberant all-conquering Marimekko burst on to the international scene" in the 1960s; she illustrates this with one pattern by Vuokko Nurmesniemi, and three by Isola – Lokki, Melooni, and Unikko. (Note: Among the best-known of the roughly 500 patterns that Isola designed, other than those already mentioned, are Primavera (Spring), Seireeni, Joonas, Tulipunainen (Tulips), Verso, Viitta, Hevosvaras, Bambu (Bamboo), Appelsiini (Oranges), Tuuli, Niili, Pariisin portit, Pepe, Tantsu, Satula, and Vaarallinen Planeetta.) Of Lokki, Jackson writes "Isola revolutionized design with her simple, bold, flat patterns, printed on a dramatic scale. The design, whose title means 'seagull', evokes the lapping of waves and the flapping of birds' wings." Of the famous Unikko, Jackson says "This huge, exploded poppy pattern embodies the unbridled design confidence of the mid-1960s, and presages the ebullience and sizzling colours of the flower power era."

Hanna-Liisa Ylipoti notes that "The themes of many Marimekko designs are also very Finnish, portraying Finnish nature. For example, Maija Isola created her Luonto (Nature) design [series] using actual plant specimens".

== Legacy ==
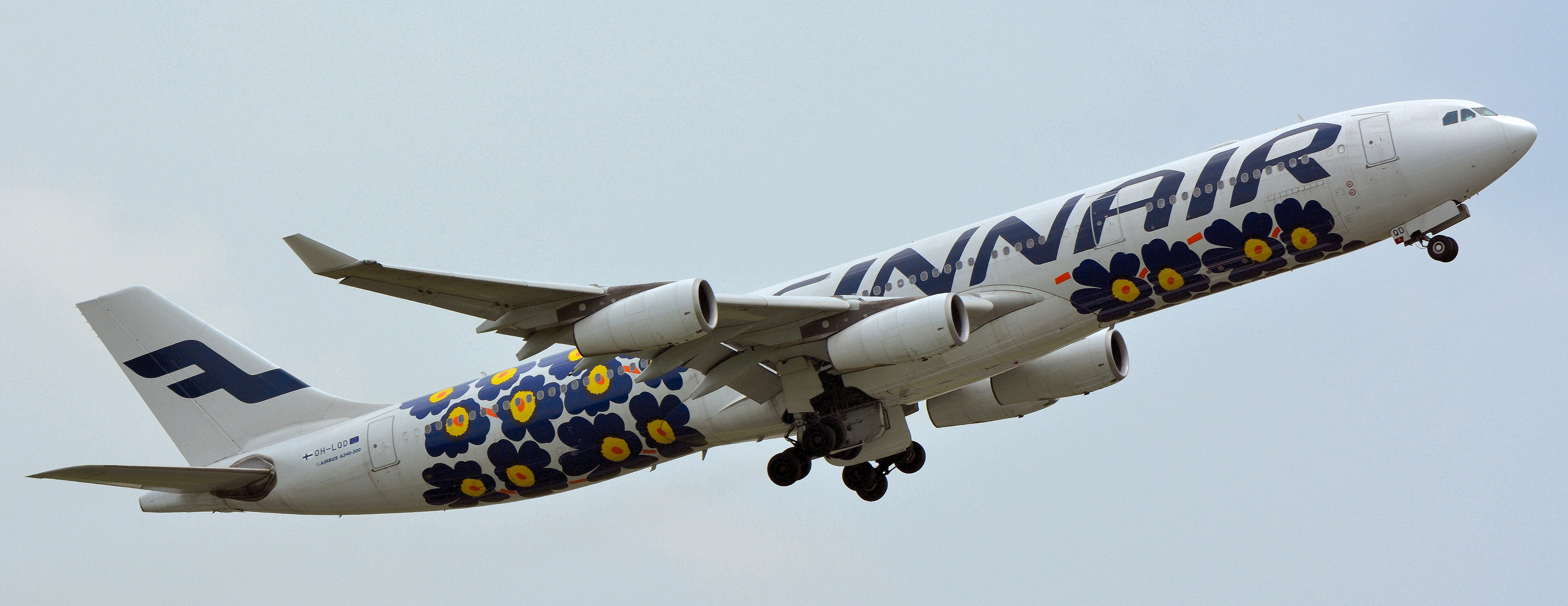
A Finnair Airbus A340-300 flies painted with Isola's 'Marimekko Unikko' pattern in 2015.

Aav noted that "As the twenty-first century gets underway, Marimekko is experiencing a resurgence of interest and appreciation—a true revival. Maija Isola's Unikko pattern, designed almost forty years ago, blooms as never before."

In 2011, Marimekko flew a hot-air balloon decorated with an enormous version of Unikko over Helsinki, reflecting the iconic status of the print, nearly half a century later. Marimekko's marketing policy is to reissue "classics from its fifty-year back catalogue, notably a large group of patterns from the 1950s and 1960s by Maija Isola."

Since 2012, Finland's airline Finnair has been flying an Airbus A340-300 to its Asia destinations sporting a blue Unikko print, while an Airbus A330 painted in an Anniversary Unikko has been serving its other intercontinental routes.

Isola was described in 2013 as a style icon. Her granddaughter Emma Isola works for Marimekko as a designer, forming a three-generation tradition.

== Exhibitions ==
=== Contemporary ===
- Design in Scandinavia, USA 1954, 1960
- Finnish Exhibition in Germany 1956
- Triennale Milan 1954, 1957
- World Exhibition Brussels Formes Scandinaves 1958

=== Retrospective ===
- Maija Isola and Marimekko, Retrospective exhibition, Design Museum (Designmuseo), Helsinki, Finland. 24 May 2005 – 4 September 2005.
- Finnish Design, Victoria and Albert Museum, London, 2005
- Marimekko – The Story of a Nordic Brand, Exhibition at Design Museum, Copenhagen, Denmark, 2 March – 28 May 2007.
- Marimekko: Fabric, Fashion, Architecture, Exhibition at Slovene Ethnographic Museum in Ljubljana, Slovenia, 1 July 2009 – 18 October 2009
- Magnifying Nature: 1960s Printed Textiles, Exhibition at Minneapolis Institute of Arts, 5 March 2011 – 21 August 2011.

== Bibliography ==
- Aav, Marianne (2003). Marimekko: Fabrics, Fashion, Architecture. Yale University Press. ISBN 978-0-300-10183-6.
- Fiell, Charlotte and Peter (2001). Design of the 20th Century. Taschen. ISBN 3-8228-5542-1.
- Fogg, Marnie (2008). 1960s Fashion Print: A Sourcebook. Batsford. ISBN 978-0-7134-9054-1. (6 page-sized illustrations of Isola's prints)
- Isola, Kristina (2005). Maija Isola: Life, Art, Marimekko. Design Museo. ISBN 978-952-9878-42-0.
- Jackson, Lesley (2007). Twentieth Century Pattern Design. Princeton Architectural Press. ISBN 978-1-56898-712-5.
- Shimatsuka, Eri (2012). Maija Isola: Art, Fabric, Marimekko: the Story of a Legendary Designer of Marimekko. PIE International. ISBN 978-4-7562-4366-9.
