= Nurmesniemi =

Nurmesniemi is a surname. Notable people with the surname include:

- Antti Nurmesniemi (1927–2003), Finnish designer
- Vuokko Nurmesniemi (1930–2026), Finnish designer
