= Milan Triennial XIII =

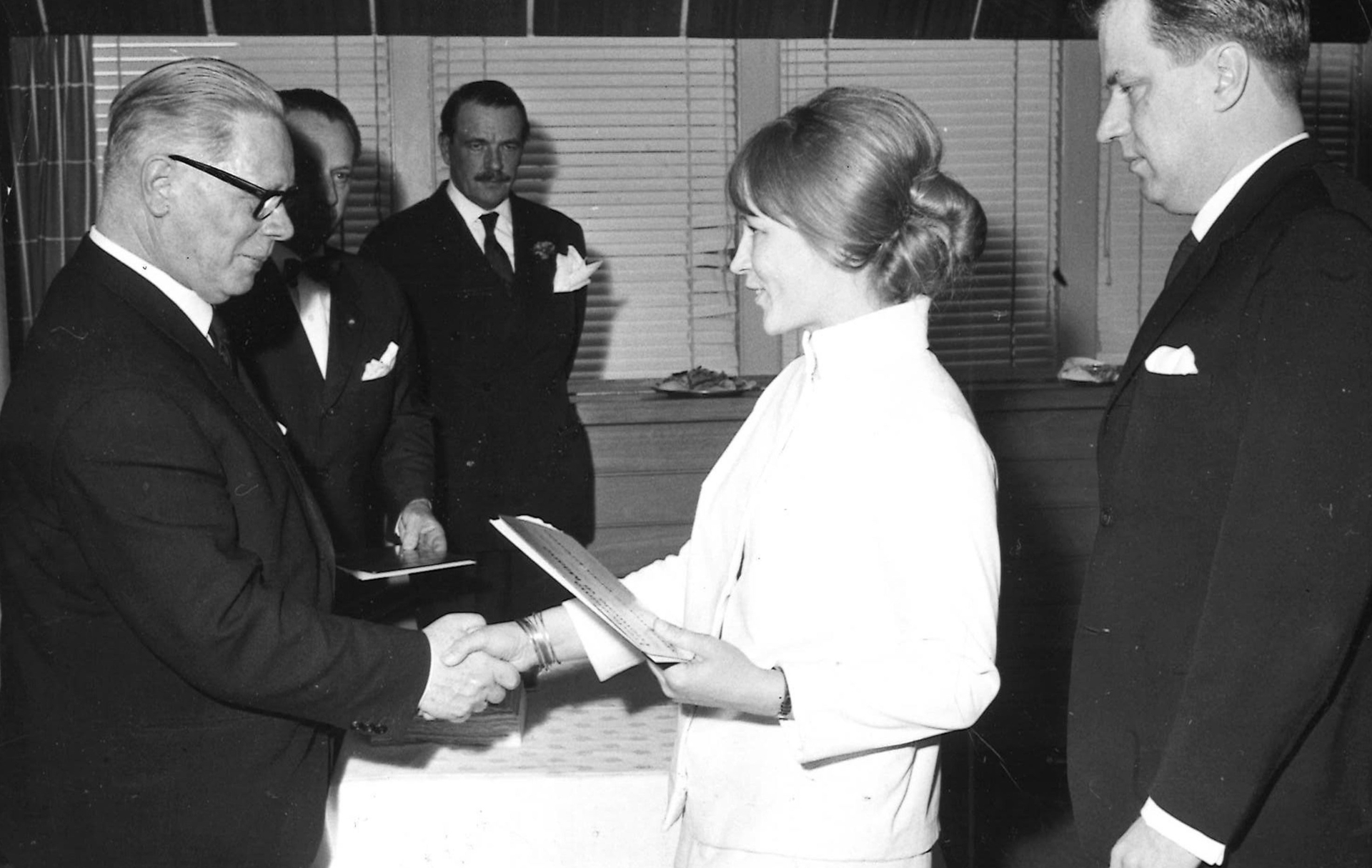
- Antti and Vuokko Nurmesniemi receiving Grand Prix medals

Overview
- BIE-class: Triennial exposition
- Name: Milan Triennial XIII
- Motto: Leisure

Participant(s)
- Countries: 14

Location
- Country: Italy
- City: Milan
- Coordinates: 45°28′19.92″N 9°10′24.78″E

Timeline
- Awarded: 12 November 1963
- Opening: 12 June 1964
- Closure: 27 September 1964

Triennial expositions
- Previous: Milan Triennial XII in Milan
- Next: Milan Triennial XIV in Milan

The Milan Triennial XIII was the Triennial in Milan on the theme of Leisure, sanctioned by the Bureau of International Expositions (BIE) on 12 November 1963 and held between 12 June 1964 and 27 September 1964.

== Prizes ==
The grand prize was awarded to Antti and Vuokko Nurmesniemi for an exhibition display, and a gold medal to Ilmari Tapiovaara for cutlery, and Gae Aulenti first prize for her work on the Italian pavilion.
