= Carl Kämp =

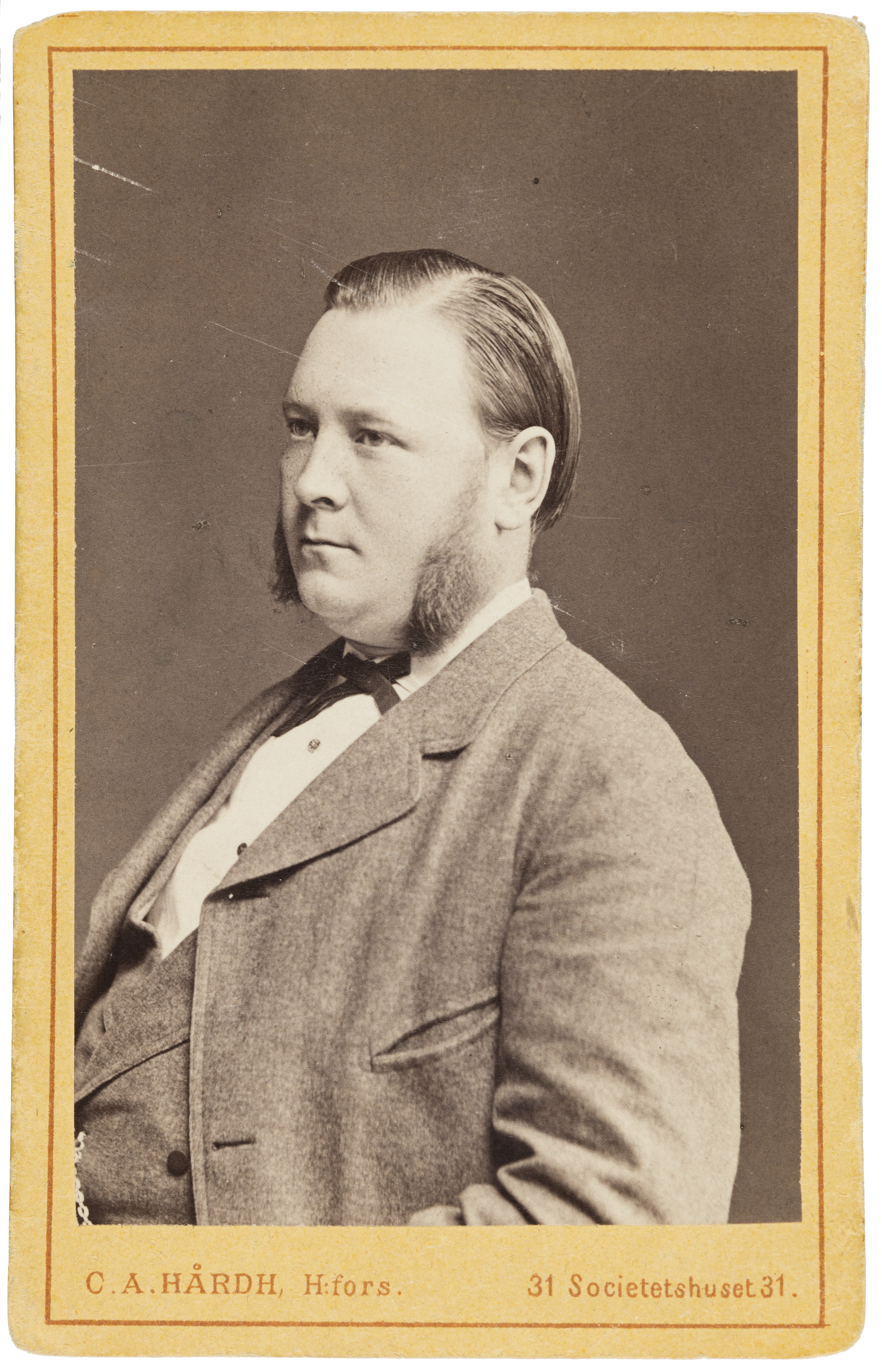
- Born: Carl Wilhelm Kämp; July 2, 1848; Tusby, Grand Duchy of Finland
- Died: November 26, 1889 (aged 41); Helsinki, Grand Duchy of Finland
- Occupations: Restaurateur, hotel owner
- Known for: Founder of Hotel Kämp

Carl Wilhelm Kämp (July 2, 1848 – November 26, 1889) was a Finnish restaurateur, hotel owner, and the founder of Hotel Kämp in Helsinki. He was one of the first native Finnish entrepreneurs to operate on a large scale in a trade long dominated by foreign-born businesspeople.

== Career ==
Kämp began his career as a waiter and cashier at various restaurants in Helsinki. In 1872, he inherited the lease to the Operakällaren restaurant in the city's new theatre building (now the Swedish Theatre). The following year he married Maria Dorothea Elise Moss (1853–1929). In 1874, he became the manager of Brunnshuset, a leading restaurant in Helsinki. In 1878, he had the restaurant garden illuminated with electric lamps for two months, one of the earliest uses of electric light in Finland. During his tenure at Brunnshuset, the venue also provided catering for the Finnish General Exhibition of 1876, the country's first major industrial exhibition.

== Hotel Kämp ==
In 1884, Kämp purchased a plot at the corner of North Esplanade and Glogatan from goldsmith Carl Fridolf Ekholm to build a first-class hotel. He commissioned architect Theodor Höijer to design a five-story building. To finance the project, which the Finnish Senate considered to be of national importance, Kämp applied for a state loan of 500,000 Finnish marks. The Senate, however, approved only 350,000 marks, with the remaining capital being provided by his neighbour Fredrik Wilhelm Grönqvist, who was the developer behind the grand Grönqvist Building across Glogatan. The building was given a red-brick facade bearing the name "Hotel Kämp", and fitted with modern interiors including a hydraulic lift, a banquet hall and around 80 guest rooms.

The hotel was inaugurated on 29 October 1887, with 400 invited guests present. The entire building was lit in electric light, a brass band played from the gallery, and a vocal quartet performed. Hotel Kämp offered a standard of comfort unprecedented in Helsinki at the time, with international cuisine and amenities aimed at a well-travelled clientele, and quickly became a central meeting place for the city's social and cultural life.

== Death and legacy ==
Kämp died of a heart attack on 26 November 1889, aged 41, after just two years of running the hotel. He was buried at Hietaniemi Cemetery in Helsinki. His gravestone bears the inscription Gud är kärleken ("God is love").

His widow Maria undertook the upkeep of Hotel Kämp, assisted by Karl König, who later became a prominent restaurateur in his own right. After financial difficulties, she relinquished control after three years. It was not until 1892, under the management of Axel Gummesson, that the hotel became consistently profitable. The hotel went on to play a role in Helsinki's cultural and social life, serving as a gathering place for artists and intellectuals, and later as the international press headquarters during the Winter War of 1939–1940.

The original building was demolished in 1965 and replaced by the headquarters of Kansallis-Osake-Pankki, a Finnish commercial bank, though the facade facing the Esplanade was reconstructed. In 1999, a new Hotel Kämp opened in the building, incorporating some historical elements.
