= Riitta Immonen =

Finnish fashion designer and entrepreneur

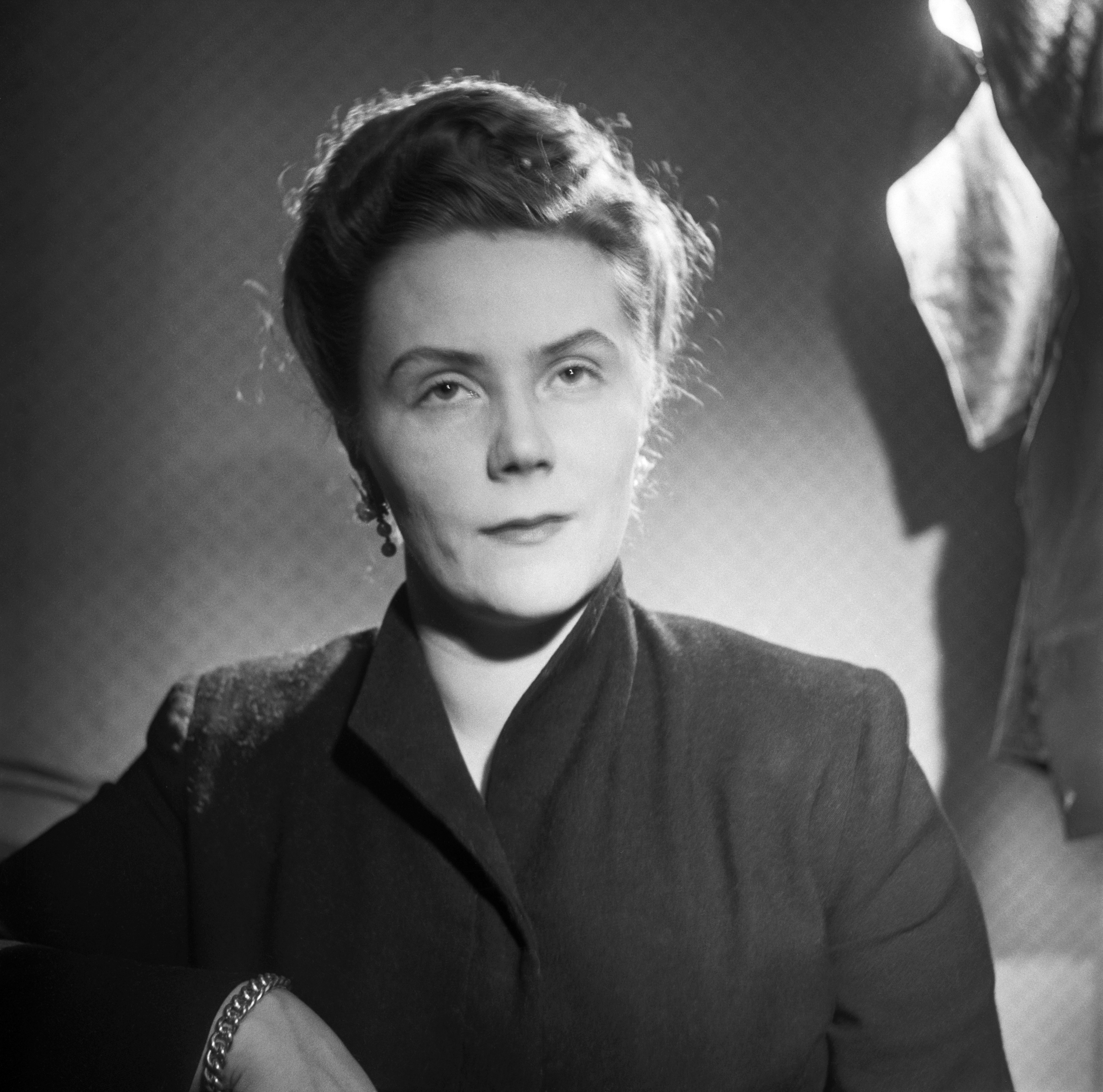
Riitta Immonen in 1949

Riitta Immonen (13 May 1918 in Ilomantsi – 24 August 2008 in Helsinki) was a Finnish fashion designer and entrepreneur, best known as the co-founder of Finnish fashion corporation Marimekko. Immonen was also known for her one-of-a-kind outfits, celebrity clients and a question-and-answer column which she wrote for Finnish fashion magazine Eeva in the 1950s and 1960s.

Riitta Immonen was born in 1918 in Ilomantsi. A self-taught clothing designer, Immonen opened her first design boutique in Helsinki during World War II in 1942 which grew into a success despite the shortages of the ensuing years. In 1951, she and Armi Ratia started up Marimekko to sell fabrics made by Finnish textile firm Printex. However, after the firm's first season, she focused on her own Cinderella collections, and eventually left Marimekko a few years later, continuing to design clothes for the rest of her life. In 1987–1990 she was still designing unique outfits for a company named Atelierika. In 2008, Immonen was the subject of an exhibition at the Finnish Design Museum. She died later the same year in Helsinki.

== Biography ==
- Koskennurmi-Sivonen, Ritva: Creating a unique dress: A study of Riita Immonen’s creations in the Finnish fashion house tradition. Helsinki: Akatiimi, 1998. ISBN 951-97208-7-1
