= Hotel Marski =

Hotel in Helsinki, Finland

Coordinates: 60.167602°N 24.941082°E

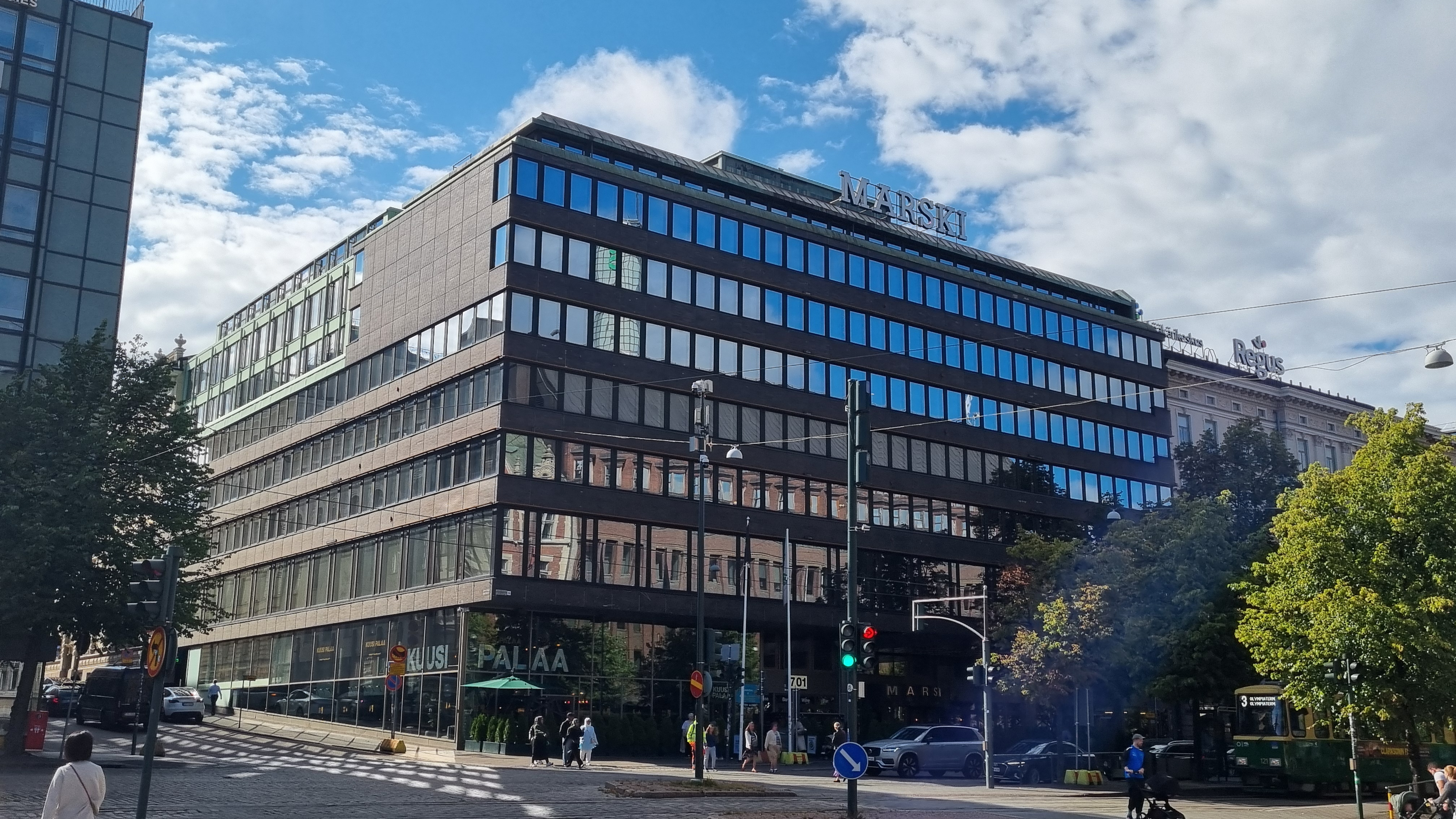
Hotel Marski in August 2025

Hotel Marski (or Marski by Scandic) is a hotel that opened in 1962 on Mannerheimintie 10 in Helsinki, Finland. The hotel is part of Scandic's Signature collection. Marski by Scandic is Finland's first Signature hotel.

The hotel was built by Alko-owned Arctia Oy and the nine-storey building with strip windows was designed in 1961 by architect Einari Teräsvirta. The name Marski (as well as the street name along which the hotel is located) refers to Marshal Mannerheim.

On the site of the hotel there previously stood a residential building, completed in 1877, which was commissioned by Nikolai Kiseleff and designed by F. A. Sjöström.

Hotel Marski was opened on February 1, 1962. At that time, the hotel had 58 rooms located on the sixth and seventh floors of the house. On the lower floors was the restaurant, the department store Otra, which was reached by escalator, and the office space of the Kansallis-Osake-Pankki (KOP). The eighth floor was leased to the oil company Shell. The number of hotel rooms increased in the 1970s and 1990s as the hotel expanded into other buildings in the block. The furniture designers of the hotel and restaurant included Ilmari Tapiovaara.

Hotel Marski was a meeting place for Finland's political elite for a long time, and President Urho Kekkonen, among others, was a regular guest. Until the 1980s, the building housed the M-klubi club, which was only open to club members. In addition, the building housed the Helsinki International Press Club, founded by the Helsinki Newspaper Association in 1962 or so-called Press club.

In 2010, the property was purchased by Valio Pension Fund, with Alko Pension Fund as the seller. The hotel then had 222 rooms. The hotel was renovated between 2018 and 2019 and reopened in early summer 2019. The hotel now has a total of 363 rooms.

Kahvila 7.01, a cafeteria located on the street level of the hotel, is named after Mannerheim, known as a regular man; Mannerheim reportedly wanted to drink his morning coffee at exactly one minute after seven in the morning.

== See also ==
- M-klubi
- Hotel Kämp
- Hotel Maria
- Hotel Torni
- Palace Hotel, Helsinki
