= Hotel Kämp =

- Hotelli Kämp; Hotell Kämp
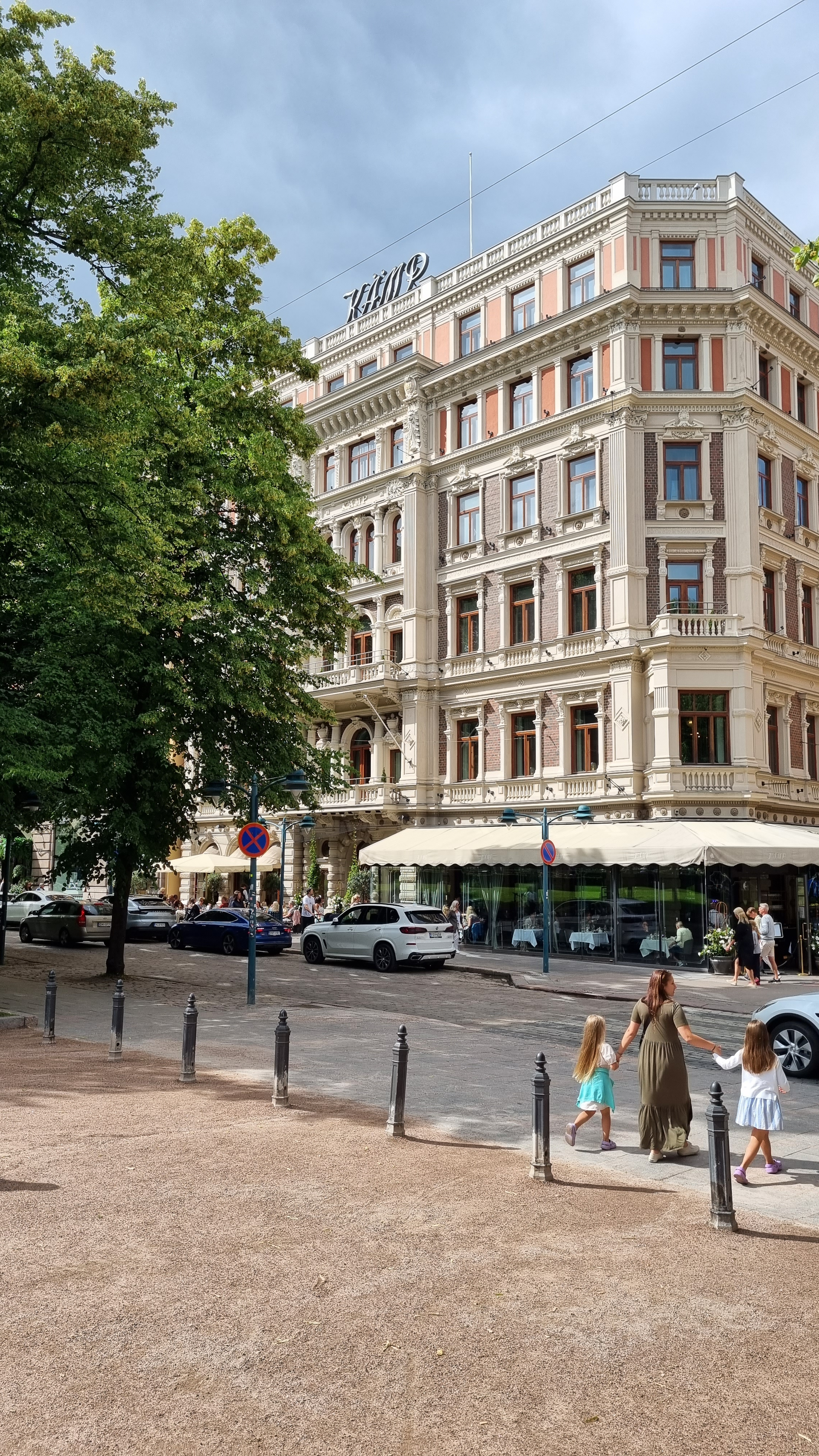
- Hotel Kämp in summer 2022.
- Interactive map of the Hotel Kämp area

General information
- Type: Grand hotel
- Location: Kluuvi, Helsinki, Finland, Pohjoisesplanadi 29
- Coordinates: 60°10′05″N 24°56′50″E
- Completed: 1887; 139 years ago

Design and construction
- Architect: Theodor Höijer

Hotel Kämp (Finland Swedish: [ˈkemp]) is a historic hotel in Kluuvi, Helsinki, Finland. It is a member of Leading Hotels of the World. The original Kämp, the first luxury hotel in Finland, was founded in 1887. Hotel operations ended in 1967. The old building was demolished in the 1960s to make way for a new hotel building, but parts of it, including the façade facing Pohjoisesplanadi, were reconstructed as copies and incorporated into the new building. The building was used as the headquarters of Kansallis-Osake-Pankki. Hotel operations resumed in 1999 as part of the Mariott International's Luxury Collection.

== History ==
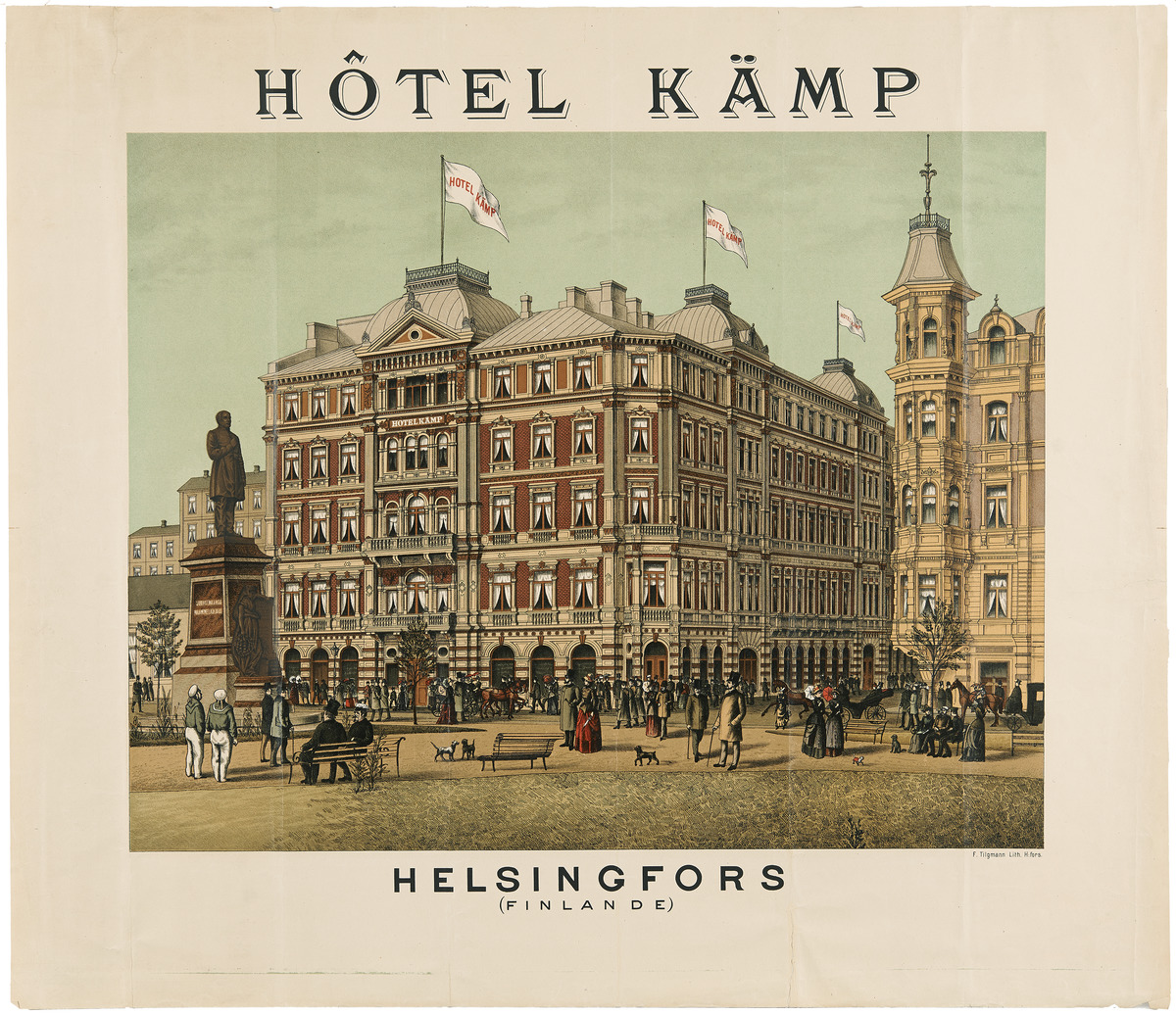
Hotel Kämp in 1887

In 1884 Carl Kämp purchased a plot at the corner of North Esplanade and Glogatan from the goldsmith Carl Fridolf Ekholm, with the aim of building a first-class hotel. He commissioned architect Theodor Höijer to design a five-storey building. To finance the project, which the Finnish Senate considered to be of national importance, Kämp applied for a state loan of 500,000 Finnish marks; the Senate approved only 350,000 marks. The remaining capital was provided by his neighbour Fredrik Wilhelm Grönqvist, the developer behind the grand Grönqvist Building across Glogatan.

The German Empire hosted an official gala dinner and reception at Hotel Kämp. During the celebration, the birthday of German Emperor Wilhelm II was honoured. The event was organised by the consulate of the German Empire.

The director of Sheraton Hotels, William Bauer, was searching for a location for a hotel in Helsinki. Bauer contacted Erkki Tammivuori, who was serving as Finland's consul in Istanbul. Tammivuori telephoned entrepreneur Mikael Bonsdorff and informed him of Sheraton's interest. Bonsdorff suggested that the new hotel should be opened along the Esplanadi, on the former site of the Kämp Hotel.

The Kansallis-Osake-Pankki and Suomen Yhdyspankki (SYP) banks merged to form Merita Bank, after which ownership of the property passed to SYP. Merita Bank's director Ove Ohlström was receptive to Sheraton's proposals. In 1995, Ohlström, investor Heikki Hyppönen, and Bonsdorff met with Sheraton representatives in Helsinki. In addition to the hotel, the plans came to include a new shopping centre. A major restoration project started in 1996. Hotel Kämp and the Kämp Galleria shopping centre opened in 1999.

In January 2014, Berling Capital, owned by investor Esa Karppinen, sold the Kämp Hotel to investment company CapMan.

Nordic Choice Hotels, now known as Strawberry, owned by Norwegian billionaire Petter A. Stordalen, bought the Kämp hotel from the private equity company CapMan in 2019. Renovations at the Kämp began in 2023 and are being carried out in phases, with the fully renovated hotel due to be completed in 2026.

Celebrities who have stayed at the hotel include Madonna, Shakira, Whitney Houston, Elton John, Lady Gaga, The Rolling Stones, Backstreet Boys, Justin Bieber, Bruce Springsteen, Mel Gibson, and U2. Royal guests have included Queen Noor of Jordan, Emperor Hirohito of Japan, King Harald and Queen Sonja of Norway.

== See also ==
- Palace Restaurant
- Hotel Maria
- Hotel Marski
- Hotel Torni
