= Palace Hotel, Helsinki =

Hotel in Helsinki, Finland

Coordinates: 60.1654°N 24.9524°E

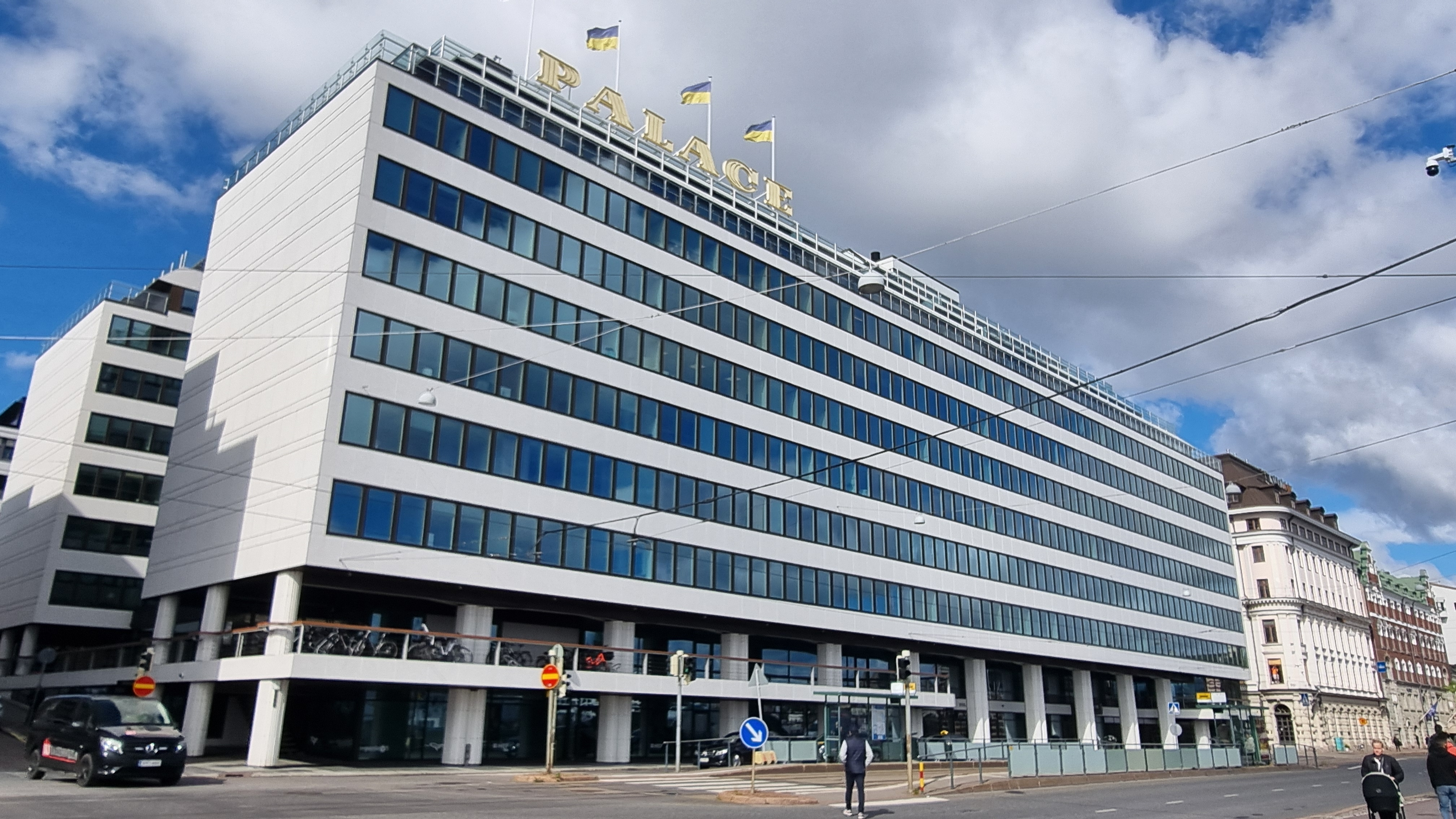
The Palace Building in August 2025

The Palace Hotel was an historic modernist hotel in Helsinki, opened in 1952, the year of the Helsinki Olympic Games. When it opened, the hotel was one of the tallest in Finland. Currently, the building hosts Confederation of Finnish Industries and the award-winning Palace Restaurant.

== Teollisuuskeskus ==
The building is referred to as Eteläranta 10 (after its address), the Palace Building (after the hotel and restaurant), the Employers' Fortress and the Industrial Palace (after its owners). Its official name is the House of Industries (Teollisuuskeskus in Finnish).

== Architecture and design ==
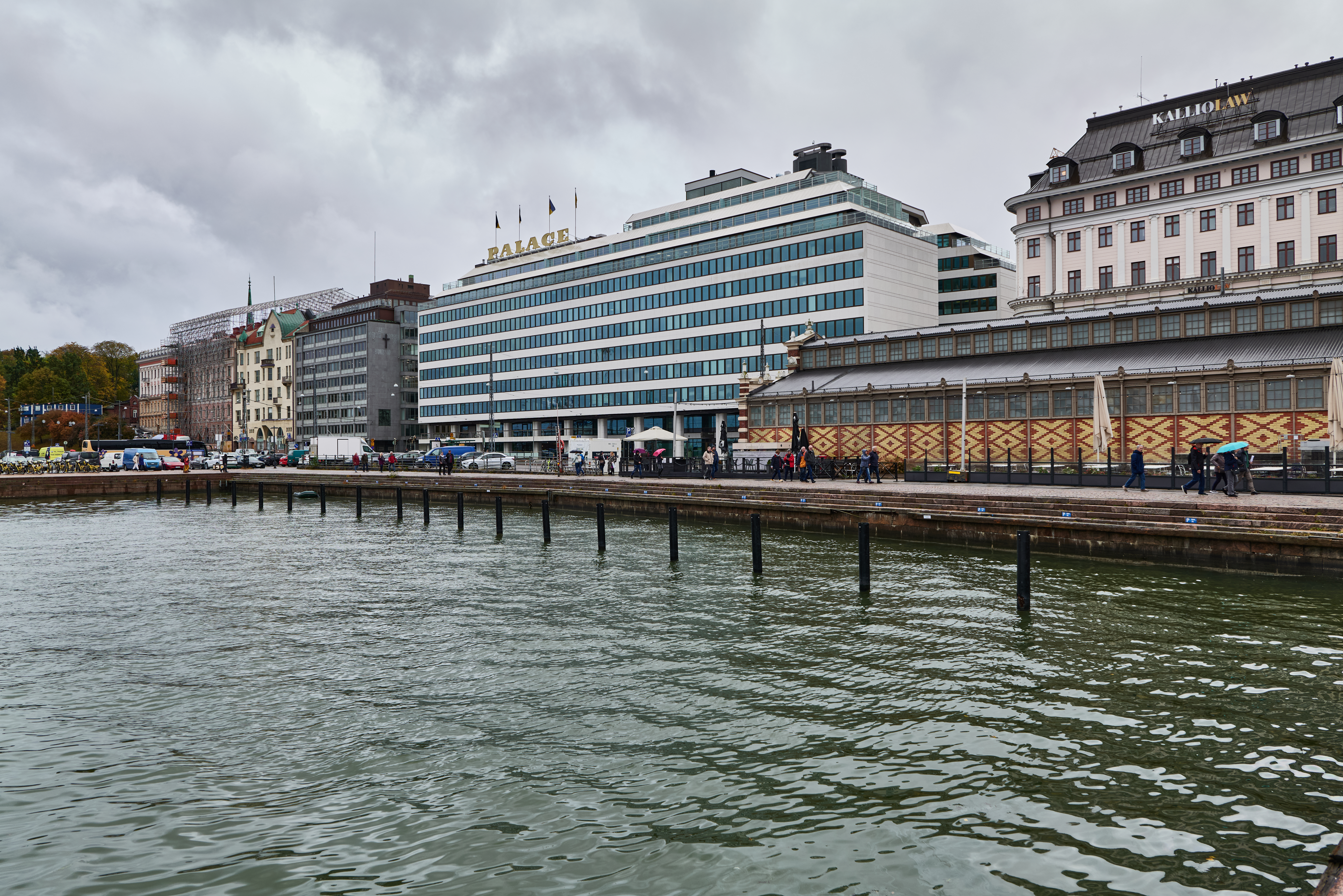
Palace Building from the Market Square

The building was designed by architects Viljo Revell and Keijo Petäjä, and was constructed during 1949–1952.

The interiors of the building were furnished by various renowned Finnish interior designers, such as Olli Borg, Antti Nurmesniemi and Olavi Hänninen.

The hotel building has been included in the selection of Finnish masterpieces of modernism in architecture by the Docomomo International organization.

== Palace Hotel ==
The hotel (1952–2009) represented Finnish modernism. In addition to the hotel and the restaurant, guests had access to a sauna and a bar. The hotel operations were discontinued in 2009. The hotel operations were discontinued because the property owner converted the hotel rooms into offices. The hotel had 39 rooms.

== Palace Restaurant ==
The Palace Restaurant, founded in 1952, represents award-winning gastronomy. Restaurant Palace operated continuously from 1952 to December 2016, but new owners reopened it in November 2017. The restaurant has influenced Helsinki's food culture. Its head chef, Eero Mäkelä, earned Finland's first Michelin star in 1987. The restaurant has won the award for Finland's best restaurant six times in a row. The most recent win was in 2025.

Restaurant has received foreign dignitaries, hosted meetings and performances. Italian Prime Minister Mario Monti and the American rock band Bon Jovi visited the restaurant. Press conferences related to the Helsinki Guggenheim museum project were held there. Among the restaurant's customers have been royalty, Finnish presidents Juho Kusti Paasikivi, Urho Kekkonen, Mauno Koivisto, Martti Ahtisaari, Tarja Halonen, and Sauli Niinistö, diplomat Henry Kissinger, prime minister Margaret Thatcher, French president François Mitterrand, Russian president Boris Yeltsin, top executives, and, American film stars Marlon Brando, William Holden, and French singer Edith Piaf.

The restaurant's former owner, Consul General Heikki Tavela, founded the Läskisoosiklubi (Fat Sauce Club), membership and guest access to which was by invitation only. It was an elite club.

== See also ==
- Market Square
- Hotel Kämp
- Hotel Marski
- Hotel Torni
- Hotel Maria
- Old Market Hall
