= Waldorf Astoria Helsinki =

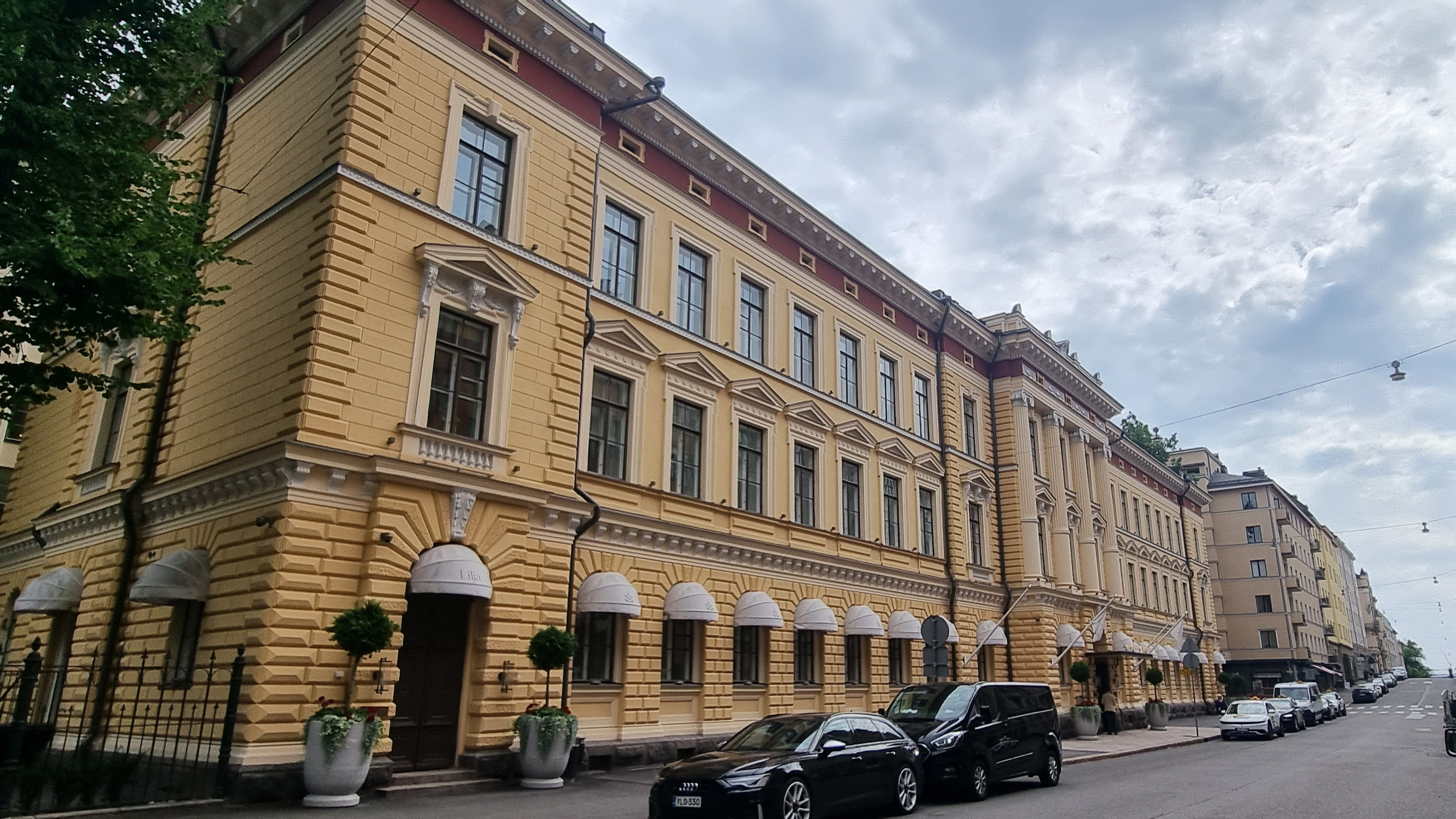
- Interactive map of the Waldorf Astoria Helsinki area
- Former names: Uusimaa Battalion Barracks; The Hotel Maria

General information
- Type: Grand hotel
- Location: Kruununhaka, Helsinki, Finland, Mariankatu 23
- Coordinates: 60°10′26″N 24°57′25″E
- Completed: 1885; 141 years ago
- Opened: First opening 15 December 2023 and Grand Opening 2 July 2024
- Owner: M&L Group

Technical details
- Floor count: 6

Design and construction
- Architect: Evert Lagerspetz

Other information
- Number of rooms: 117

Website
- Official Site

Waldorf Astoria Helsinki (formerly known as The Hotel Maria) is a luxury hotel in Kruununhaka, Helsinki, Finland along Mariankatu. It has 117 rooms, including 38 suites. The hotel has a spa and two restaurants.The hotel is operated by Hilton Worldwide, and it belongs to Waldorf Astoria Hotels & Resorts. Hotel Maria is the first Waldorf Astoria hotel in the Nordic countries.

== History ==
The current Hotel Maria building complex was originally completed in stages between 1885 and 1930. Its oldest part was designed by Evert Lagerspetz, and it was originally built as the officers' barracks of the Uusimaa Battalion. The building was expanded to the Liisankatu side in the 1930s, designed by Armas Siitonen. Later, the former officers' barracks housed the Finnish Agricultural Board, and the Seed Inspection Department and the Department of Agricultural Chemistry were located in the side buildings.

The hotel complex is located on Liisankatu as well, a street named after Empress Elizabeth Alexeievna, the spouse of Emperor Alexander I of Russia.

== The Hotel Maria ==
The hotel project began when Samla Capital, owned by Samppa Lajunen, purchased a city block located on Mariankatu, Liisankatu, and Maneesikatu in 2020.

Construction of the hotel started in January 2023. The developer was the Finnish construction company Fira, and the architect was the Finnish architectural firm Avarc.

The hotel project drew inspiration from the Nordic countries, Paris, and London.

The hotel opened its doors on December 15, 2023. It received recognition as part of the Preferred Hotels & Resorts Legend Collection. The project was fully completed in July 2024, with official opening celebrations held on July 2, 2024. The Hotel Maria was recognised in Forbes' listing of the world's best hotel openings of late 2024.

The Emir of Qatar, Tamim bin Hamad bin Khalifa Al Thani, reserved the entire hotel during his state visit to Finland in September 2024.

The Flow Festival's headliner, pop star Charli XCX, stayed at Hotel Maria in August 2025.

== Ownership ==
The financing of the hotel project was originally challenging. Investors were found in Finland, but not sufficiently to start the project. The financing of the hotel project proved difficult. Eventually, investors were found in London. The funds used for the construction of the hotel amounted to about 166 million euros. The hotel was operated by SC Hotels Operations. The hotel opened in December 2023, but the entire hotel was fully opened in the summer of 2024. The hotel was supposed to generate profit from the opening day, but this is an impossible task among luxury hotels. Helsingin Sanomat first reported in September 2024 that the hotel was facing financial difficulties, meaning the hotel was making a loss and capital buffers were low. The hotel's largest lender informed investors on January 30, 2025, that it should be put up for sale. This would have meant that investors would have lost all their funds. Lajunen opposed the sale of the hotel because he defended the investors' interests. In July 2025, Lajunen announced that the hotel had been sold to the Singapore-based M&L Hospitality Group owned by Michael Kum. The hotel came under Hilton's Waldorf Astoria brand in July 2025.

== See also ==
- Hotel Kämp
- Hotel Torni
- Hotel Marski
- Palace Restaurant
