= Vuokko Nurmesniemi =

Finnish textile designer (1930–2026)

Vuokko Eskolin-Nurmesniemi FRSA, HonRDI
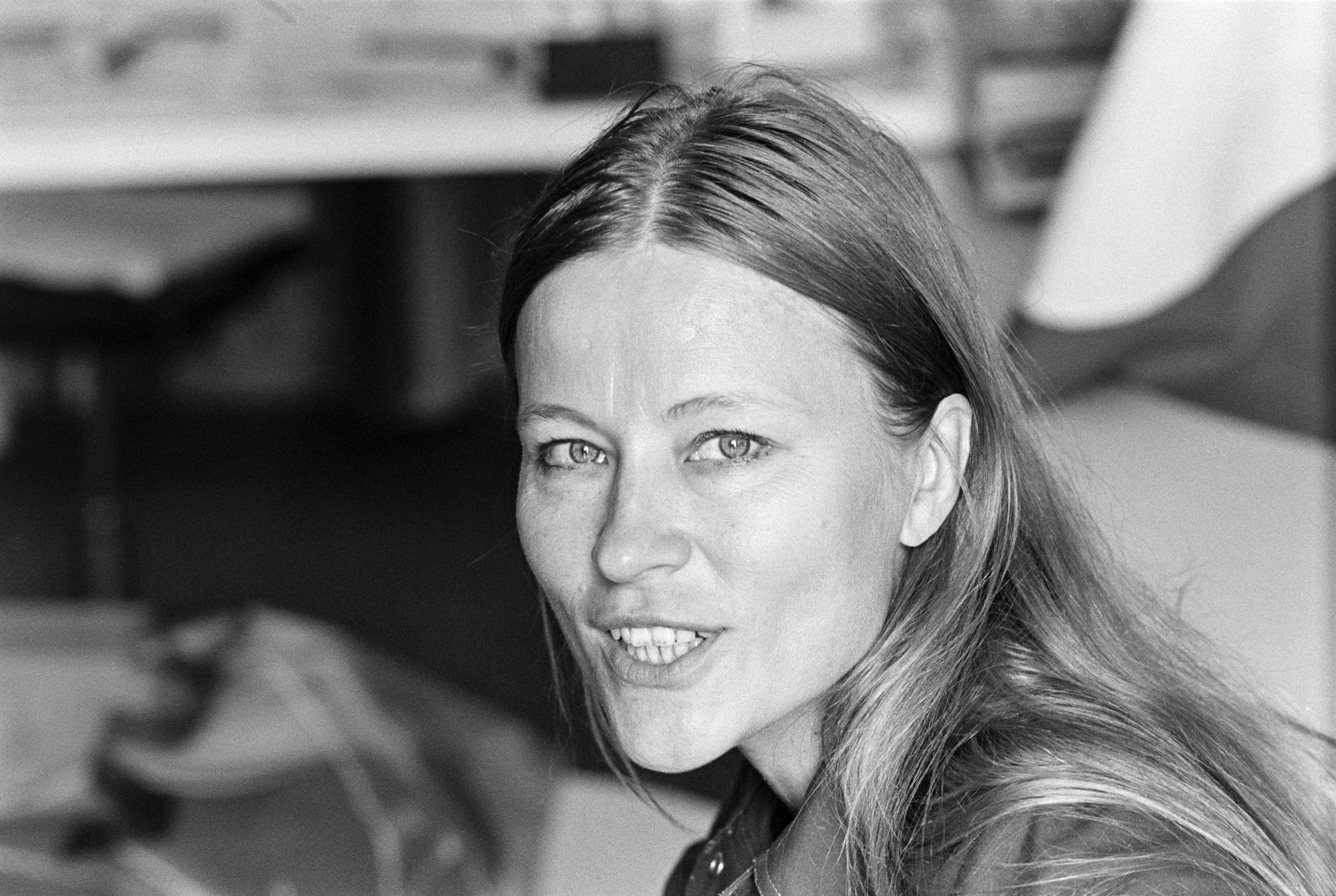
- Nurmesniemi in 1971
- Born: Vuokko Hillevi Lilian Eskolin; 12 February 1930; Helsinki, Finland
- Died: 19 April 2026 (aged 96); Helsinki, Finland
- Education: Institute of Industrial Arts (Helsinki)
- Known for: Textile design at Marimekko
- Spouse: Antti Nurmesniemi (died 2003)
- Awards: Arts Academian, Honorary Royal Designer for Industry

Vuokko Hillevi Lilian Eskolin-Nurmesniemi (12 February 1930 – 19 April 2026) was a Finnish textile designer. She is best known for her work as one of the two leading designers of the Marimekko company. Her signature striped Jokapoika shirt helped to make the company's name.

== Life and career ==
Eskolin-Nurmesniemi studied ceramics at the Institute of Industrial Arts (in Finnish: Taideteollinen oppilaitos) in Helsinki, Finland. After graduating, she designed glassware and ceramics for Arabia and Nuutajärvi. In 1957, she received a gold medal at the Milan Triennial XI for her glassware.

She joined the Finnish company Marimekko in 1953. She designed patterns for many of their printed fabrics in the 1950s; together with Maija Isola, she was responsible for most of Marimekko's patterns. Nurmesniemi's signature product was a simply striped red and white shirt named Jokapoika, in 1956; she went on to create a large number of striking designs.

Nurmesniemi left Marimekko in 1960 due to conflicts with Marimekko founder Armi Ratia. She founded her own company, Vuokko Oy, in 1964, and designed textiles as well as ready-to-wear clothing and accessories. This company closed its doors in 1988. In 1990 Nurmesniemi founded a second company, Vuokko Nurmesniemi Oy.

She received the Milan Triennale XI in 1957 and Milan Triennial XIII grand prix in 1964, the Lunning Prize for design in 1964, the Prince Eugen Medal in 1986, and the Kaj Franck Design Prize in 1997.

Nurmesniemi was married to designer Antti Nurmesniemi until his death in 2003.

Vuokko Nurmesniemi died on 19 April 2026, at the age of 96.

== Museums and exhibitions ==
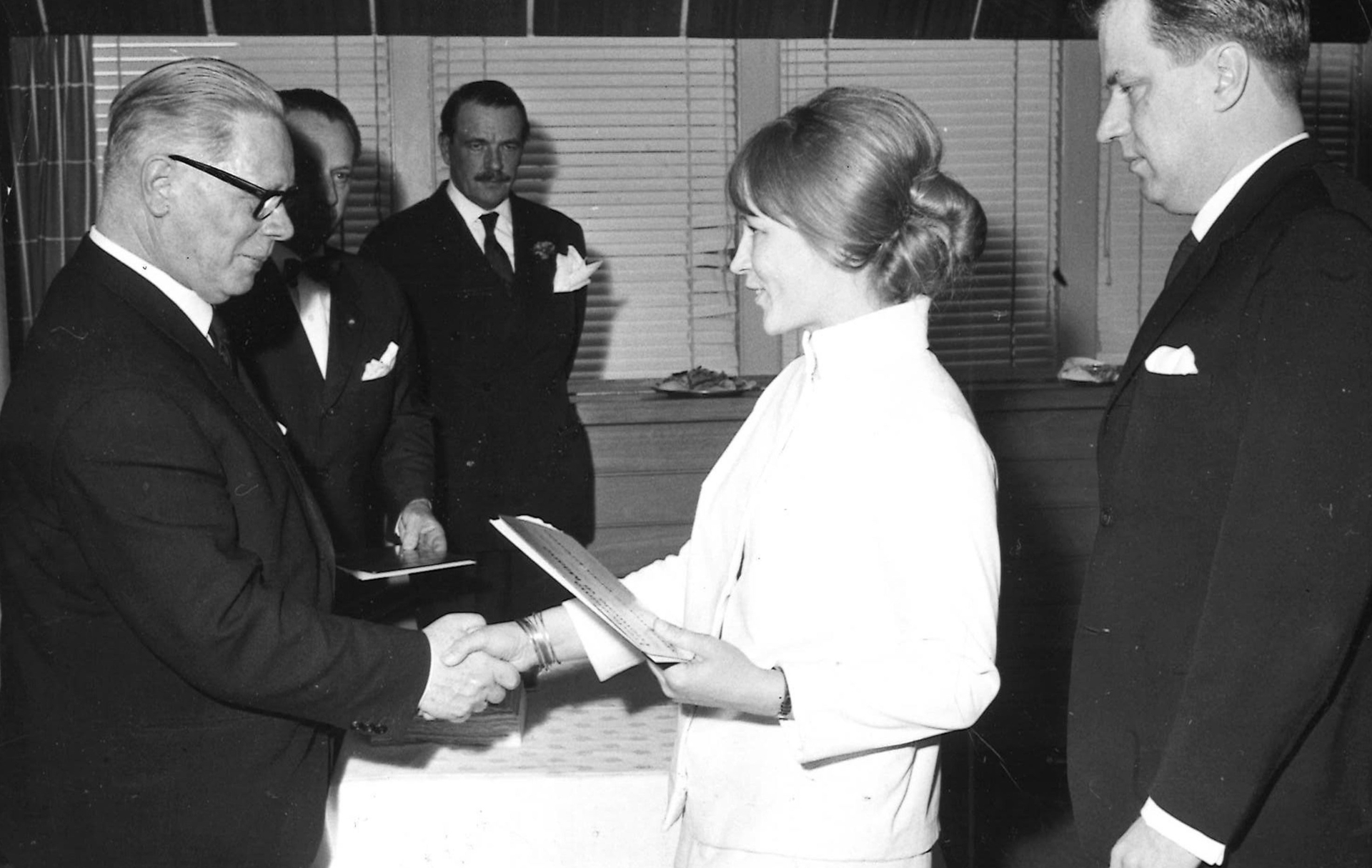
Vuokko and Antti Nurmesniemi (right) receiving the Milan medal from the Finnish minister of education Jussi Saukkonen in 1965.

Nurmesniemi's designs are in the permanent collection at the Metropolitan Museum of Art and the Victoria and Albert Museum.

In the summer of 2009, the Röhsska museum in Gothenburg, Sweden, held an exhibition of her designs.

== Reception ==
Ted Hesselbom of the Swedish Röhsska Museum wrote of Vuokko's Retrospective in 2009:

Vuokko Nurmesniemi's collections for fashion and interior design have a strong graphic and colourful design. Their style and expression is clearly from the same era as Andy Warhol, Mark Rothko and Roy Lichtenstein.

== Awards and honorary titles ==
- Gold Medal for Glass XI, Triennale di Milano, Italy (1957)
- Lunning Prize, Denmark and the United States (1964)
- Pro Finlandia Medal, Finland (1969)
- Prince Eugen Medal, Sweden (1986)
- Honorary Royal Designer for Industry, the Royal Society of Arts, London, the United Kingdom (1988)
- Honorary Doctor, Aalto University School of Arts, Design and Architecture, Finland (2007)
- Arts Academician, Finland (2007)

== Bibliography ==
- Jackson, Lesley. Twentieth Century Pattern Design. Princeton Architectural Press, 2007. ISBN 978-1-56898-712-5
