= M-klubi =

M-klubi was a restaurant and private club located at the basement of the Hotel Marski on Mannerheimintie in Helsinki, Finland, from 1962 up to the 1980s. The restaurant could seat 225 people. Its most famous members included mining counselors, trade union leaders and ministers. The club has also been referred to as the "Piggy bank club" and the "Mau-mau club".

The membership fee was originally 2000 markka, equivalent to 230 euro in 2008. The club was open from 9 PM to 4 AM. Helsingin Sanomat commented in its report of the opening of the club that "this was handy in eliminating the so-called afterparties at home which annoyed the neighbours". In 1980 the club had 4700 members.

Attendees invited to the opening were given a present set to the side of their plate. Women got an orchid and men got a silver disc as a symbol of honorary membership in the club. The evening supper served oxtail soup, river trout and pheasant. The club was opened at 1 AM, when Speaker of the Parliament Karl-August Fagerholm cut a blue-white ribbon held by CEO Aki Marte.

Throughout the years attendees at the club included all the celebrities in Finland starting from President of Finland Urho Kekkonen. Jyrki Hämäläinen and Markku Veijalainen have mentioned in their memoirs that one could see all the most important celebrities of the time at once at the club. Prime Minister of Finland Ahti Karjalainen held evening meetings with various focus groups at the club.

There was an unfortunate event at the opening of the club when a rat ran through the restaurant hall as the hosts were shaking hands with the invited attendees. The club got in an unfavourable light when the Minister of Education of Denmark Kristen Helveg Petersen was denied entry to the club as he did not have a membership card.
