= Michael Kum =

Singaporean businessman

- Born: Michael Kum Soh Har; 1945 (age 80–81); Singapore
- Education: London Chamber of Commerce (1966)
- Occupations: Business magnate Judicial officer
- Years active: 1969—present
- Board member of: M&L Manager Board
- Spouse: Lynda
- Children: 3
- Website: www.mnlht.com

Michael Kum Soh Har (Chinese: 甘烈明; pinyin: Gān Lièmíng; born 1945) is a Singaporean business magnate and investor. He is the founder the shipping organisation Miclyn Holdings and the property firm Grandline International.

== Early life ==
Michael Kum was born 1945 in Singapore. Both of Kum's parents were hawkers. He graduated from the London Chamber of Commerce in 1966, earning a Certificate in Higher Commercial Law and Higher Costing (Cost Accounting).

== Career ==
Kum is the Executive Chairman of the M&L Group and Non-Executive Chairman of the M&L Manager Board. He is responsible for the overall direction of the M&L Group, including devising the corporate and business strategies and plans of M&L Hospitality. Kum obtained a Certificate in Higher Commercial Law and Higher Costing (Cost Accounting) from the London Chamber of Commerce in 1966. He started his career in 1969 as the Finance and Administration Manager for Marine Charters (Singapore) Pte Ltd. He was subsequently appointed to the Board of Marine Charters (S) Pte Ltd in 1972 and continued his service in that position until 1975, when he resigned to establish Marine Equipment Pte Ltd, an offshore support vessel owning company.

In 1976, Kum co-founded Offshore Equipment Pte Ltd to charter offshore support vessels and barges to the oil and gas exploration, development and production industry in the Middle East and South East Asia. Kum was responsible for the development and expansion of Offshore Equipment Pte Ltd. By 1994, under Kum's leadership, Miclyn Holdings Pte Ltd, the holding company of Offshore Equipment Pte. Ltd, owned 10 offshore support vessels and barges. Miclyn Holdings Pte Ltd expanded its operations over time, and was consolidated and renamed Miclyn Offshore Pte Ltd ("Miclyn Offshore") in 2004.

In 2005, Kum spearheaded the strategic acquisition of a shipyard in Batam, Indonesia and in 2006, led the expansion of Miclyn Offshore to India. Kum was an Executive Director in Miclyn Express Offshore ("MEO") from 2007 to 2009, the new entity set up pursuant to the majority sale of Miclyn Offshore and its group of companies to a Macquarie ahead of the IPO of the business on the ASX. In 2009, Kum set up Grandline International Limited for investment holding purposes, with a focus on real estate hospitality investments. M&L Hospitality is wholly owned by Grandline International Limited.

Kum has been instrumental in spearheading the growth and development of Grandline International Limited and its related entities in the real estate hospitality sector. Since 2009, under Kum's leadership, the M&L Group has become a major hotel owner with 12 properties in Australia, Japan, London, New Zealand and Singapore. In 2025, the M&L Group acquired grand Hotel Maria in Helsinki, Finland.

== Personal life ==
Michael Kum is married to Lynda. They reside in Singapore and have three children. Their eldest daughter is Jocelyn Kum Wan Sze.
