= Olavi Hänninen =

Finnish designer and interior architect

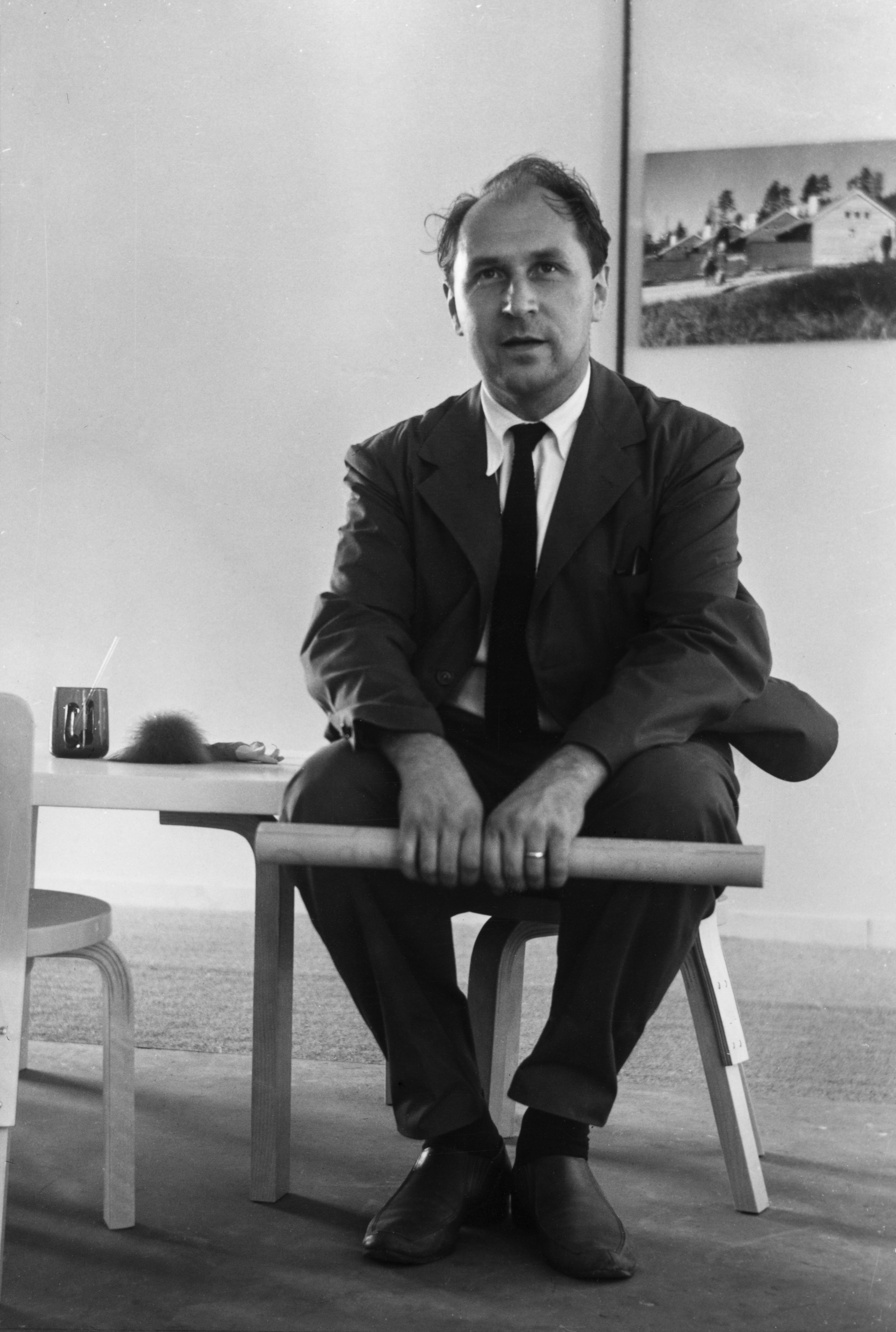
Olavi Hänninen in 1957.

Olavi Tapio Hänninen (14 December 1920, in Lapinlahti – 16 June 1992 in Espoo) was a Finnish designer and interior architect.

== Career ==
Olavi Hänninen's design projects ranged from furniture to trams and church silverware, including total interior designs for many public facilities. His modernist designs also included tables and chairs, and he was well recognized for his work on the Palace Hotel interiors together with Antti Nurmesniemi and Olli Borg. Hänninen designed a renowned plastic chair with metal structure for the hotel's café. In the 1970s, his designs included the new Valmet Nr I trams for Helsinki City Transport.

Before starting his own design office in 1961, Hänninen worked at architect Viljo Revell's offices in the early 1950s, where one of his tasks was to design selected interiors for the Palace Hotel building completed in 1952.

In 1957, Hänninen received a gold medal at the 11th Milan Triennale for his design of a dwelling exhibition in the Finnish Pavilion. In 1977, he received the State of Finland Award for Industrial Design. He was also an honorary member of the Finnish Association of Interior Architects. A book on Hänninen's life work, Muovituolista raitiovaunuun, consisting of articles written by six Finnish experts on arts and design, was published in 2006.

== Personal life ==
Olavi Hänninen was married to textile artist Airi Snellman (1930–2022).
