= Theodor Höijer =

Finnish architect

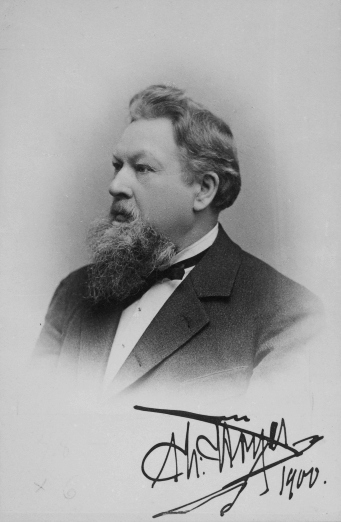
- Höijer in 1900
- Born: Carl Theodor Höijer; 20 February 1843; Helsinki, Grand Duchy of Finland, Russian Empire (present day Finland)
- Died: 31 October 1910 (aged 67); Helsinki, Grand Duchy of Finland, Russian Empire
- Occupation: Architect

Carl Theodor Höijer (20 February 1843, Helsinki – 31 October 1910, Helsinki) was a Finnish architect. He designed a large number of buildings in central Helsinki. He was the first architect in Finland who managed to pursue a truly successful career without holding an official office. He has been described as the foremost architect working in Neo-Renaissance style in Finland.

== Life and work ==
Theodor Höijer was the son of a mirror manufacturer, Henrik Höijer. The father wanted Theodor Höijer to go into the family business and needed a co-worker with skills in architecture. Theodor Höijer never finished high school and had to acquire his skills outside the normal institutions. Initially he worked as an assistant to the county architect of Turku, Georg Theodor Chiewitz, and later studied at the Royal Institute of Art in Stockholm. Here he was heavily influenced by his teacher Fredrik Wilhelm Scholander. He returned to Finland in 1868. In the meantime, his father's business had ceased to operate and he began working independently as an architect. Although he applied for a job at the government agency responsible for supervising building activity he was never accepted and worked his whole life as an independent, privately operating architect.

His first commissions came from a large industrial brewery, the Diocese of Helsinki and Helsinki Municipality. His breakthrough came in 1876, when he was responsible for designing the buildings of a large industrial exhibition. Around the same time he received a prestigious commission from the industrialist Fredrik Wilhelm Grönqvist to build a large tenement house in a central Helsinki (1880), and subsequently got more and more commissions. These were often from the upper middle class, and many times concerned large buildings in central Helsinki (such as Hotel Kämp, 1886). To a degree it can be said that central Helsinki is characterised by the buildings of Höijer. He has been described as the foremost architect working in Neo-Renaissance style in Finland.

The design for Ateneum (built 1885) marked the high point of Höijer's career. During the 1890s the building activity in Helsinki dropped, and when it increased again around 1900 his style was becoming out of fashion. He was at this time heavily criticised by the younger generation of architects in Finland. He continued to be active but on a smaller scale, with less prestigious commissions and together with a partner, the engineer Robert Huber.

Apart from his work as an independent designer of buildings, Höijer was influential in so far as he managed to create a successful business model and organise his architectural firm in a way that inspired many other architects. He also contributed to setting up an architects' club in Finland. He also taught draughtsmanship at the Polytechnical Institute (today Helsinki Technical University) in 1873–76. After his forced retirement in 1905 due to illness, he was granted a pension by the Finnish Senate.

== Gallery ==
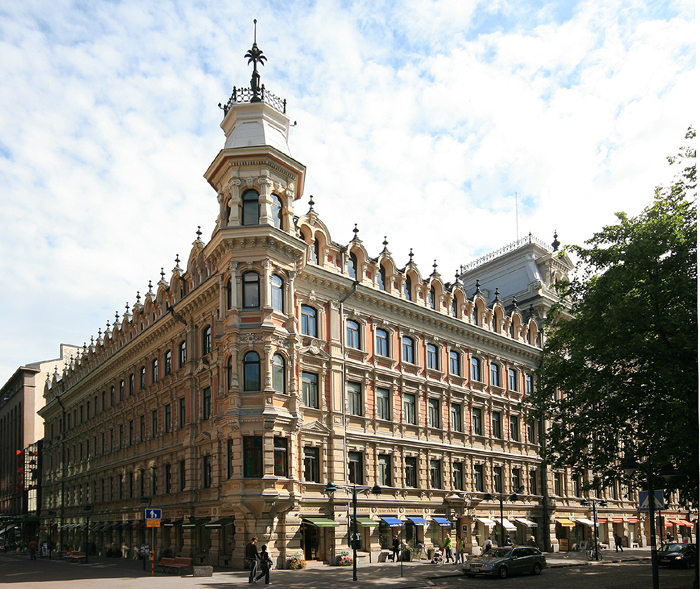
House for Fredrik Wilhelm Grönqvist (1880)

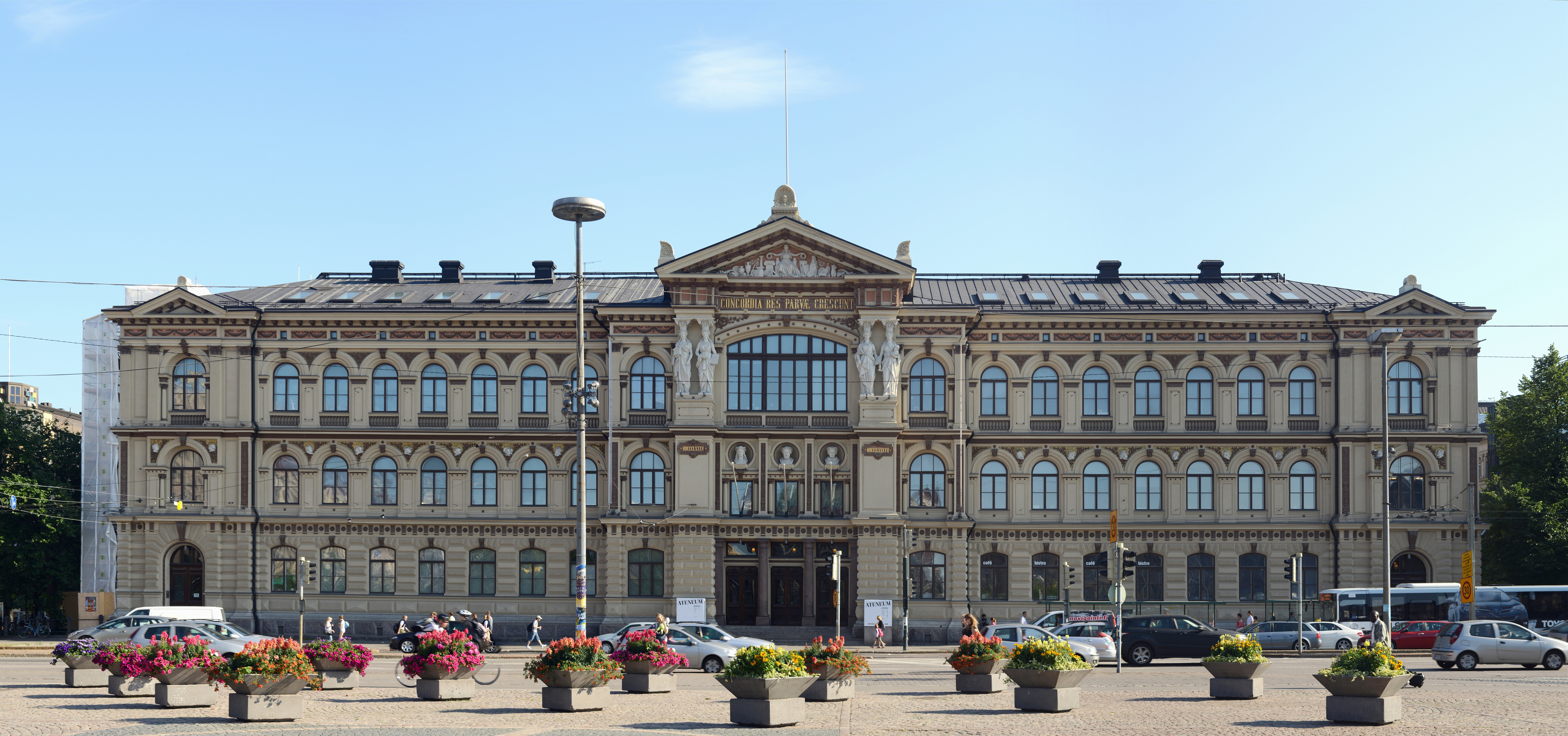
Ateneum (1885)

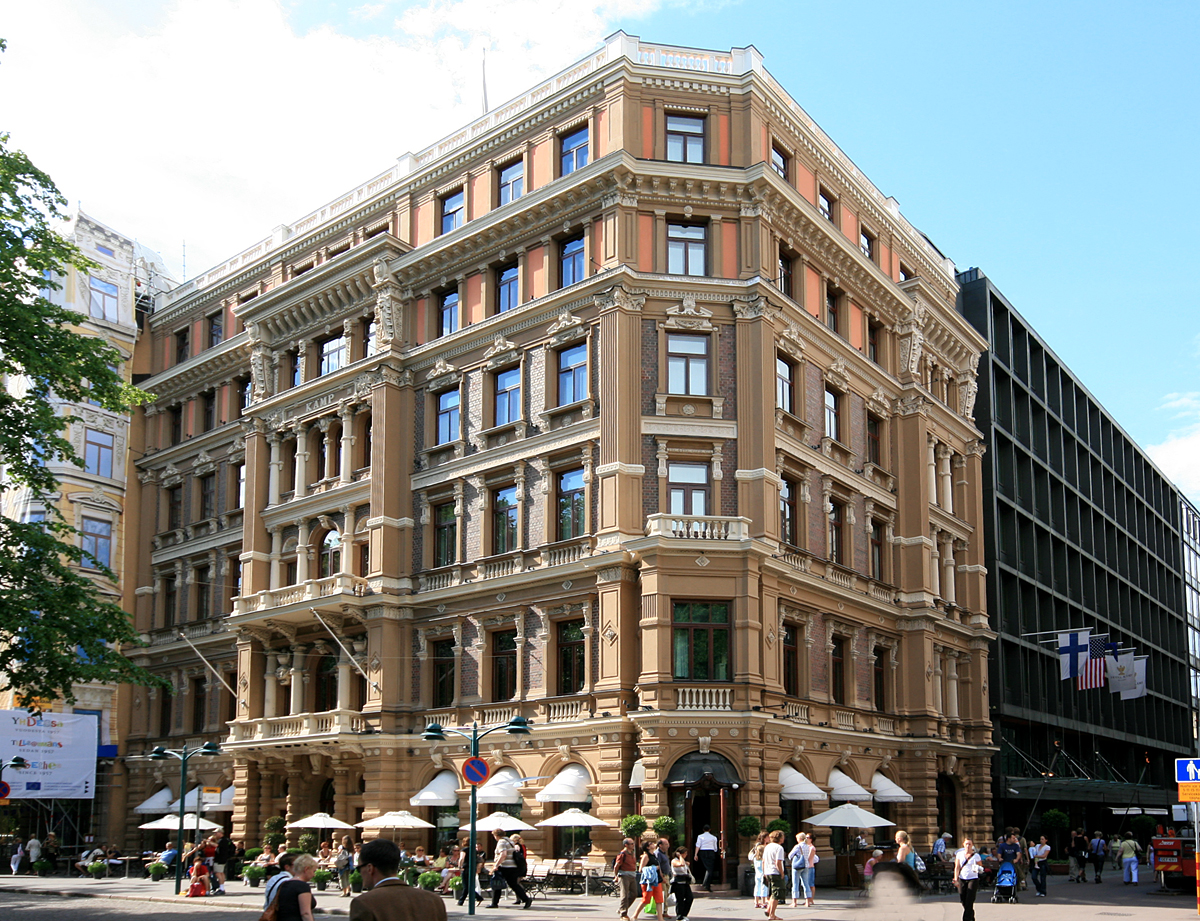
Hotel Kämp (1886)

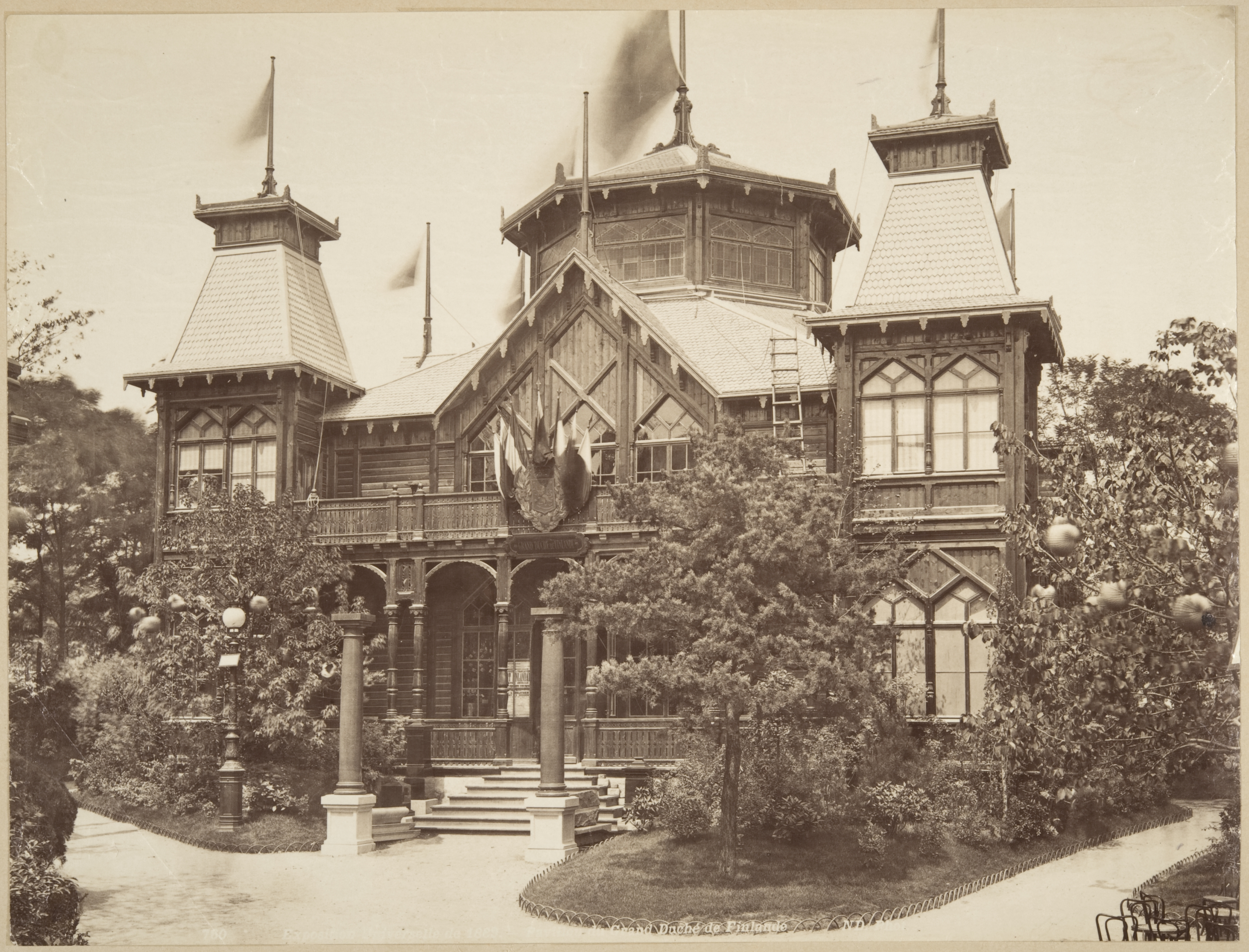
Finnish Pavilion at the Paris 1889 Exposition

== See also ==
- Architecture of Finland
- Finnish art
