= Marimekko =

Finnish clothing and home furnishings company

Marimekko Corporation
- Logo since 1954

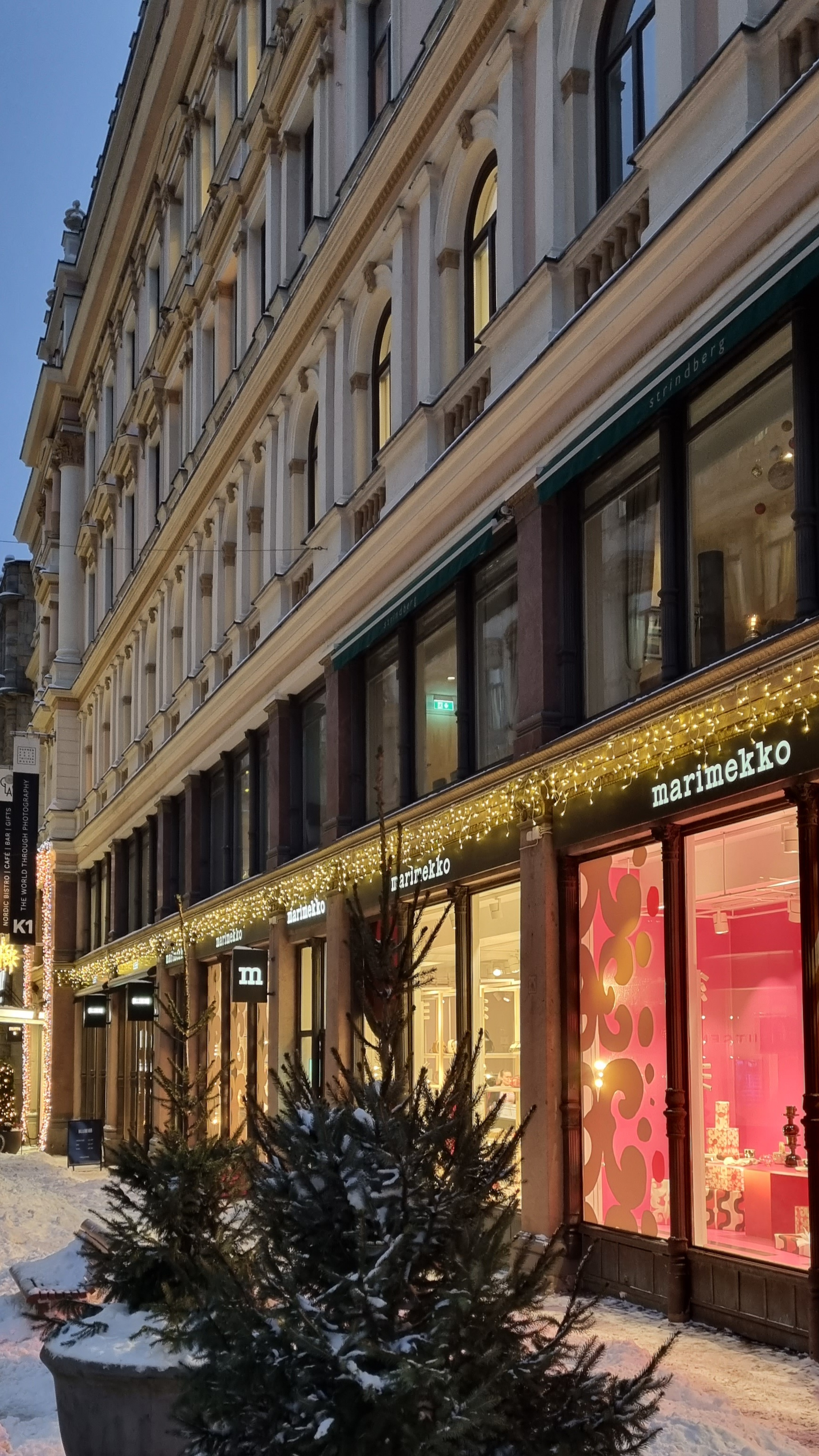
- Marimekko at Kämp Galleria in Helsinki.
- Native name: Marimekko Oyj
- Type: Public (Julkinen osakeyhtiö)
- Traded as: Nasdaq Helsinki: MEKKO; LSE: 0JX9; OTC Pink Limited: MKKOF
- ISIN: FI0009007660
- Industry: Textiles; Clothing; Home furnishings Retail
- Founded: 25 May 1951; 75 years ago in Helsinki, Finland
- Founders: Viljo Ratia; Armi Ratia; Riitta Immonen
- Headquarters: Helsinki, Finland
- Number of locations: 170 stores (2025)
- Area served: Worldwide
- Key people: Tiina Alahuhta-Kasko (CEO); Mika Ihamuotila (Chairman); Maija Isola (Designer); Vuokko Nurmesniemi (Designer)
- Revenue: ▲€189.6 million (2025)
- Operating income: ▼€30.4 million (2025)
- Net income: €24.4 million (2025)
- Number of employees: ▲493 (31 December 2025)
- Website: marimekko.com

Marimekko Corporation (Finnish: Marimekko Oyj) is a Finnish textiles, clothing, and home furnishings company founded by Viljo and Armi Ratia in Helsinki in 1951. Marimekko made important contributions to fashion in the 1960s. It is particularly noted for its brightly colored printed fabrics and simple styles, used both in women's garments and in home furnishings.

Two designers in particular, Vuokko Nurmesniemi, with bold stripes, and Maija Isola, with large simple flowered prints such as the Unikko poppy, created hundreds of distinctive patterns and helped to make Marimekko a household name across the world.

== Etymology ==
The co-founder, Armi Ratia, first considered Armi as the company's name, but it was already registered. Her middle name was Maria, shortened to Mari; her husband Viljo thought of different names for women's clothing. In her home town of Koivisto, Armi heard people talking about dresses (Finnish: mekko), and so she came to the name Marimekko.

== History ==
=== Foundation ===
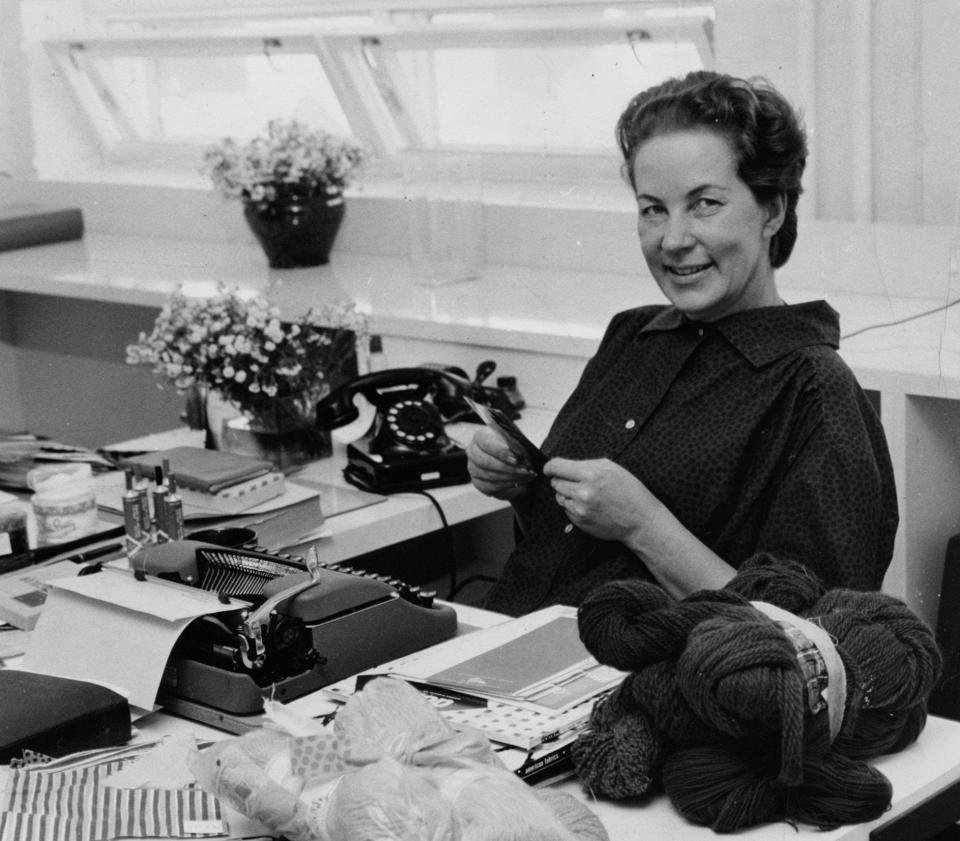
Finnish entrepreneur Armi Ratia (1912–1979), co-founder of Marimekko.

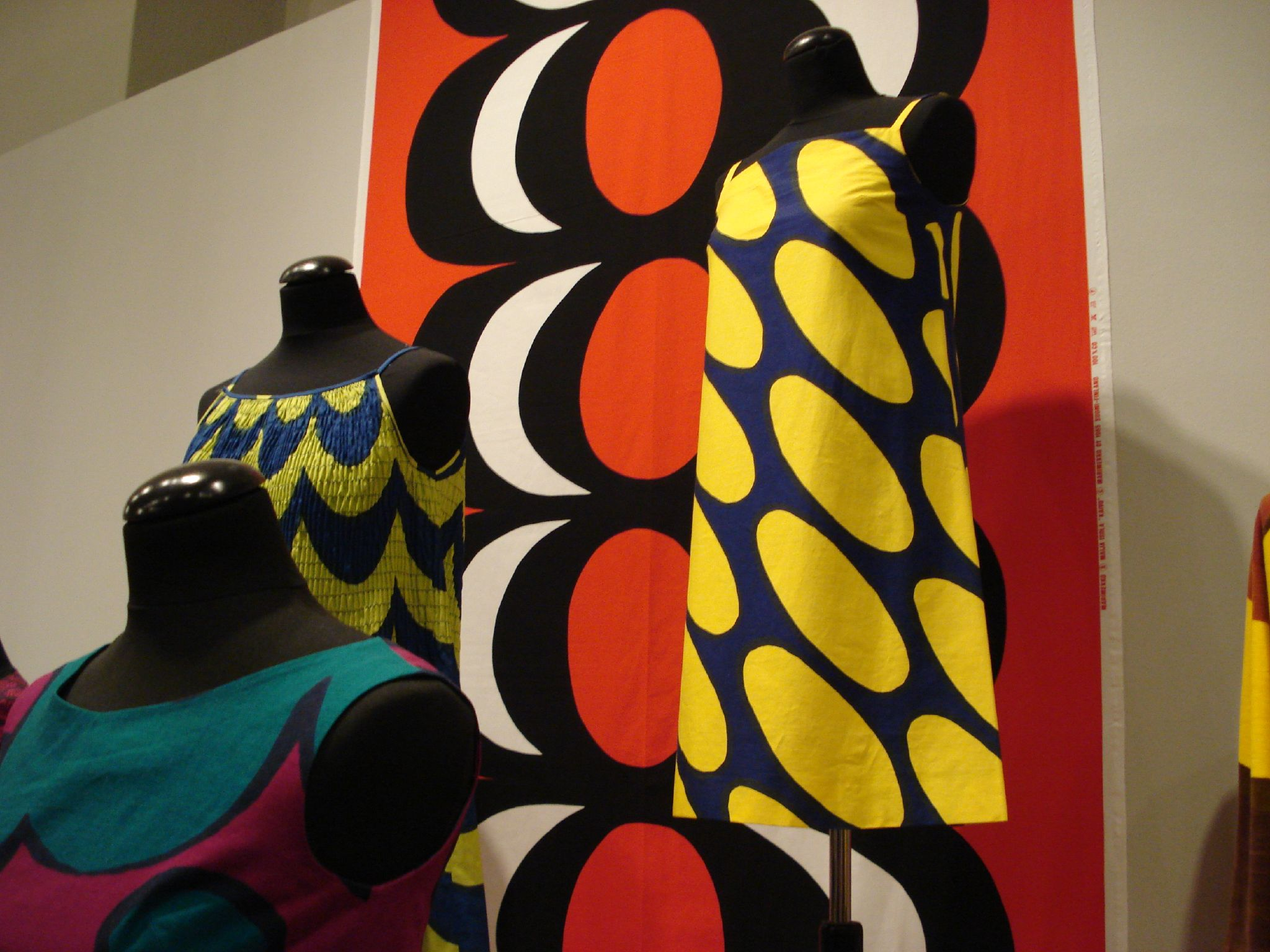
1960s Marimekko dresses using Maija Isola prints

Marianne Aav's book on Marimekko uses Isola's 1964 Unikko poppy print on the cover.

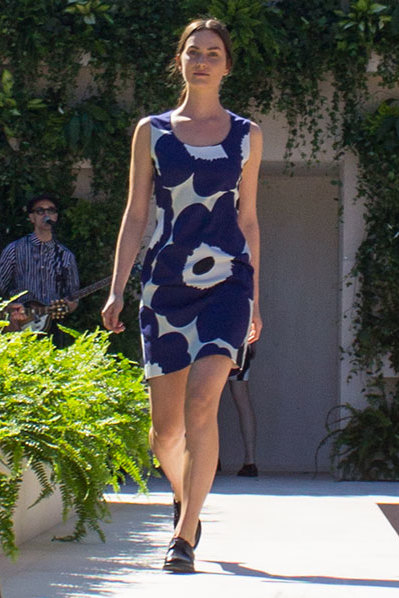
Spring 2015: Model showing a Marimekko dress using Maija Isola's 1964 'Unikko' (Poppy) print.

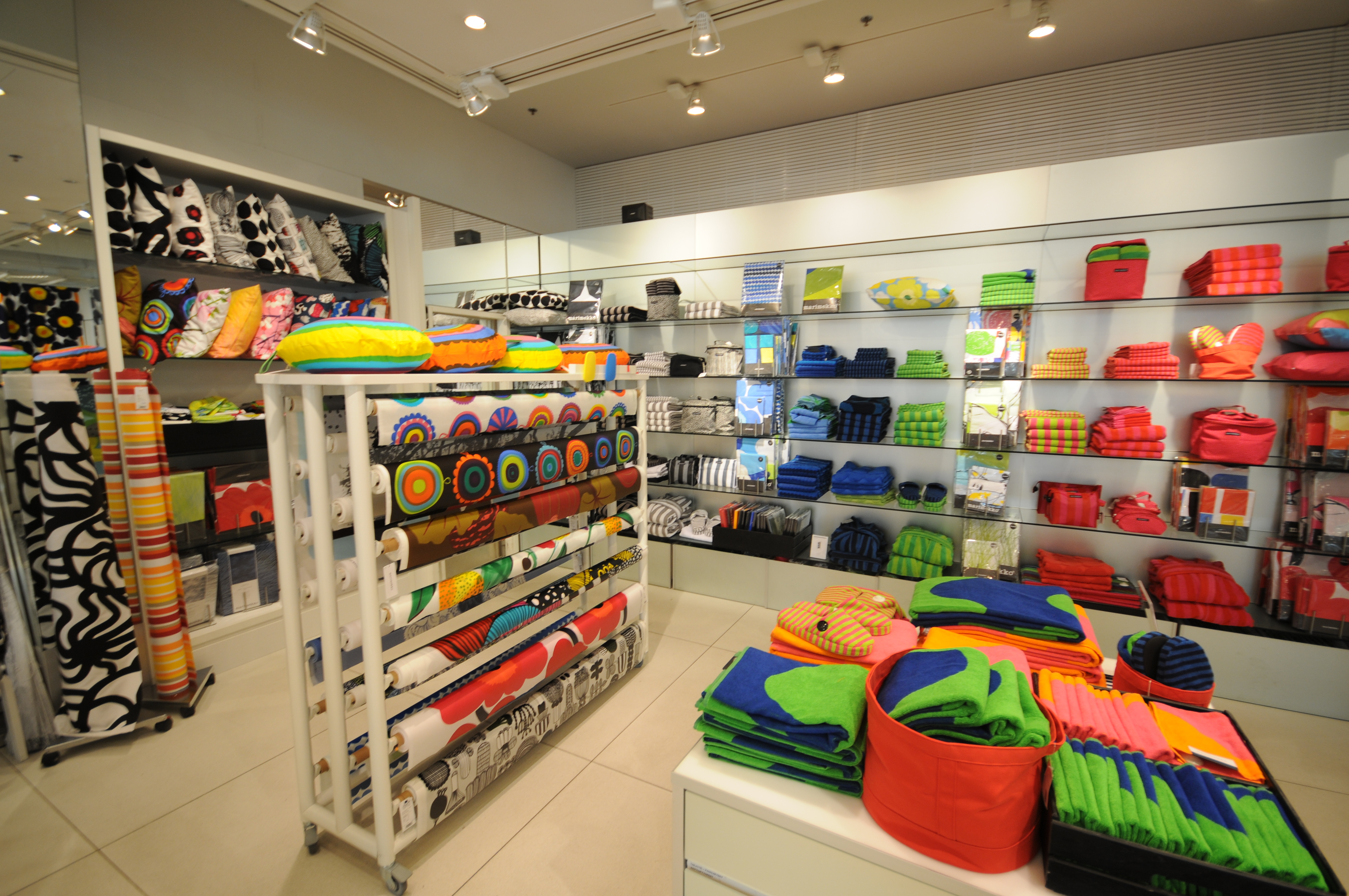
A Marimekko store in Kamppi, Helsinki

Marimekko was founded in 1951 by Viljo and Armi Ratia, after the Viljo's oil-cloth factory project failed and was converted to a garment plant. Armi asked some artist friends to apply their graphic designs to textiles. To show how the fabric could be used, the company then designed and sold a line of simple dresses using their fabric. When Finland's leading industrial designer Timo Sarpaneva invited the company to present a fashion show (albeit canceled at short notice) at the 1957 Triennale in Milan, it was an early recognition of fashion as an industrial art and of Marimekko's key role in shaping it to that point. The garments were eventually showcased in the nearby Rinascente upscale department store by display manager Giorgio Armani.

=== Pioneering design ===
Two pioneering designers set the tone for Marimekko: Vuokko Nurmesniemi in the 1950s and Maija Isola in the 1960s. Nurmesniemi designed the simply striped red and white Jokapoika shirt in 1956. Isola designed the iconic Unikko (poppy) print pattern in 1964. Marimekko's bold fabrics and bright, simple design strongly influenced late 20th-century taste. Many of the early Marimekko designs, including Isola's Unikko, remain in production in the 2010s.

=== Commercial growth ===
Marimekko spread to America in the 1960s. It was introduced to the United States by the architect Benjamin C. Thompson, who featured them in his Design Research stores. They were made famous in the United States by future first lady Jacqueline Kennedy, who bought eight Marimekko dresses which she wore throughout the 1960 United States presidential campaign.

By 1965, the company employed over 400 staff, and the company was in every aspect of fine design, from fabrics to toys and dinnerware. The firm even completely equipped small houses with furnishings. In 1985, the company was sold to Amer-yhtymä. In the early 1990s, Marimekko was in a bad financial condition and close to bankruptcy. It was bought from Amer by Kirsti Paakkanen, who introduced new business methods in the company and helped to revive its popularity.

Later in the 1990s Marimekko achieved publicity in the hit TV series Sex and the City. The fictional main character of the series, sex-and-relationship columnist Carrie Bradshaw, wore a Marimekko bikini on season 2 and then a Marimekko dress. In season 5 the series introduced tablecloths with Marimekko prints.

In 2005, Marimekko's revenue had quadrupled since Paakkanen's purchase, and its net income had grown 200-fold. Paakkanen remained CEO of Marimekko and owned 20% of the company via her business Workidea. In 2007, Paakkanen announced she would gradually hand over her ownership to Mika Ihamuotila as CEO and biggest owner of the company. By 2011 there were 84 stores across the world.

Marimekko products are made in China, India, Thailand, Portugal, Lithuania and other countries. Fabrics are printed in Marimekko's textile factory in Helsinki, but are not made in Finland. The company celebrated its 70th anniversary in 2021 by publishing the book Marimekko: The Art of Printmaking.

== Logo ==
The logo of Marimekko has been in use since 1954. Armi Ratia wanted the logo to be simple and timeless. Graphic designer Helge Mether-Borgström used modified versions of classic Olivetti typewriter letters to create the logo.

== Reception ==
Cindy Babski wrote in the New York Times that "There was never any doubt about what the inside label would say. The clothes and fabrics, with their striking design and splashes of bold color, were clearly Marimekko. But for people of a certain generation—those who came of age in the 1960s—they represented more than just a brand name: They conjured up an image and an era."

In 2007, Heidi Avellan wrote in the Swedish newspaper Sydsvenskan that Marimekko was no longer a "statement, just as T-shirts with revolutionary Che Guevara or Palestinian scarves rarely express any political awareness. Marimekko is paper napkins and rubber boots". She wrote that Marimekko "began with the colourfully striped shirt, Jokapoika which Vuokko Nurmesniemi designed in 1956", which became the symbol for new radicalism in academia.

== Controversies ==
In 2013, allegations were raised accusing Marimekko of plagiarism. In house designer Kristina Isola later admitted copying design elements from 1963 painting by Ukrainian artist Maria Primachenko. By the time the accusations were raised, the design had been painted on the body of one of Finnair's planes, and the National Museum of Ukraniain Folk Art, which held the copyright to Primachenko's design, pursued legal action over the incident. Finnair moved to repaint the plane as quickly as possible.

After the incident was raised, other works by Marimekko were identified to be alleged to have strong similarities to works previously released by artists Maria Jauhiainen, Markus Lepo and Heljä Liukko-Sundström. Five designs came under suspicion, with Marimekko defending against some claims, and trying to settle others. In the case of Lepo's design, Marimekko's CEO later apologised for misleading consumers about the originality of the designs.

== Sources ==
- Aav, Marianne (2003). Marimekko: Fabrics, Fashion, Architecture. Yale University Press. ISBN 978-0-300-10183-6.
- Borrelli-Persson, Laird (2021). Marimekko: The Art of Printmaking. Thames and Hudson. ISBN 978-0-5000-2398-3.
- Fogg, Marnie (2008). 1960s Fashion Print: A Sourcebook. Batsford. ISBN 978-0-7134-9054-1. (6 page-sized illustrations of Isola's prints) Google Books
- Isola, Kristina (2005). Maija Isola: Life, Art, Marimekko. Design Museo. ISBN 978-952-9878-42-0.
- Jackson, Lesley (2007). Twentieth Century Pattern Design. Princeton Architectural Press. ISBN 978-1-56898-712-5.
