= Kirsti Paakkanen =

Finnish business executive (1929–2021)

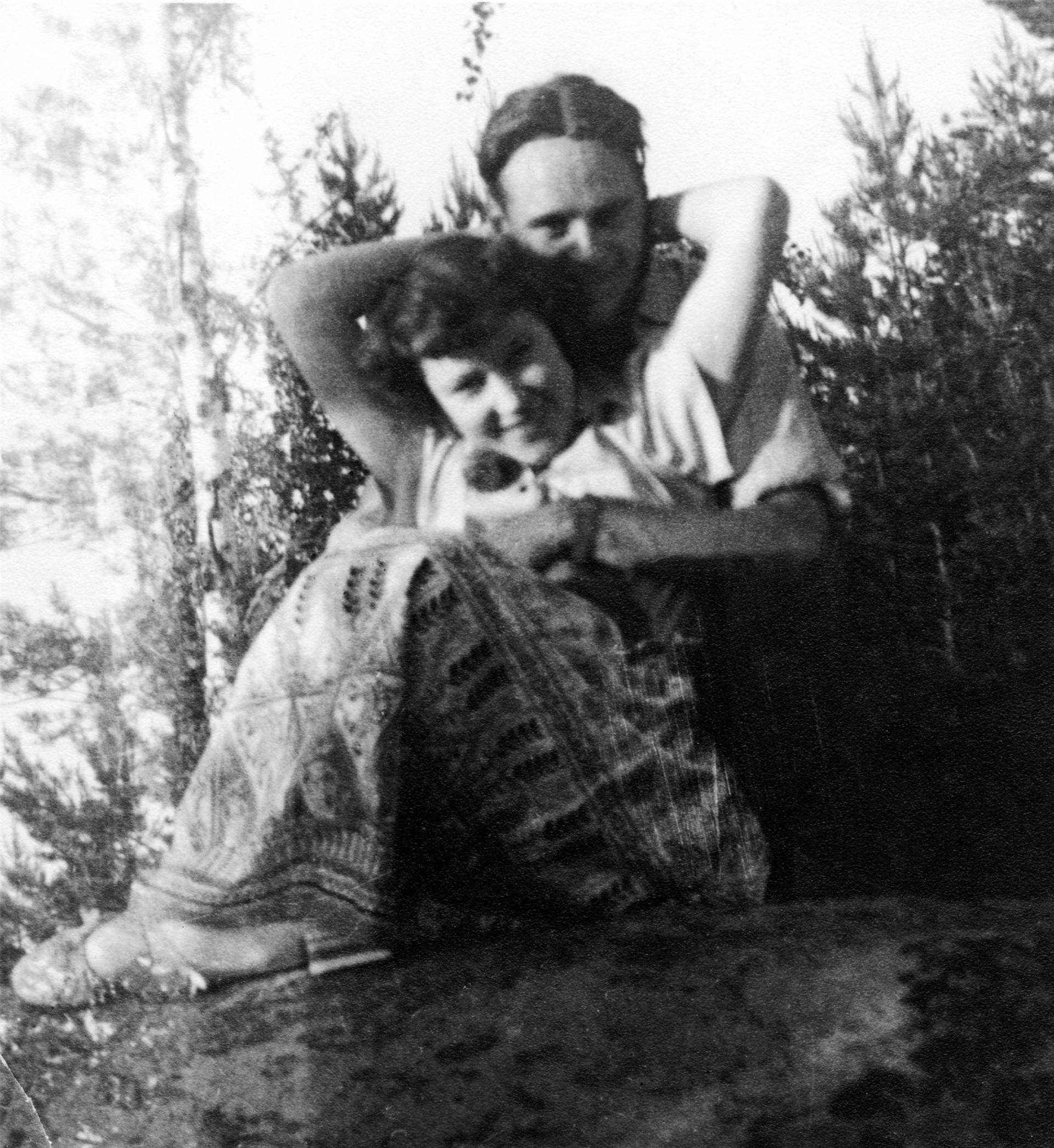
- Kirsti and Jorma Paakkanen in 1951
- Born: Kirsti Kaarina Poikonen; 12 February 1929; Saarijärvi, Finland
- Died: 2 November 2021 (aged 92); Espoo, Finland
- Occupations: Entrepreneur and business executive
- Known for: Owner and CEO of Marimekko
- Spouse: Jorma Paakkanen (m. 1952; div. 1964)

Kirsti Paakkanen (née Poikonen; 12 February 1929 — 2 November 2021) was a Finnish entrepreneur and business executive.

== Career ==
Paakkanen studied advertising, and worked for many years in the marketing departments of Finnish retail companies including Elanto and Stockmann.

In 1969, Paakkanen set up her own advertising agency, Womena, which she ran for over 20 years, until selling it in 1990 to McCann.

In 1991, Paakkanen acquired the struggling design and fashion house Marimekko from the Amer group (now Amer Sports), and successfully turned it around, growing sales three-fold in a space of five years, and eventually listing the company on the Helsinki Stock Exchange in 1999. She retired from day-to-day running of the business in 2007, appointing Mika Ihamuotila as her successor; two years later Ihamuotila acquired her shares.

== Honours and awards ==
In 1999, Paakkanen was appointed Yrittäjäneuvos (lit. 'Entrepreneur Counselor') by the President of Finland.

In 2002, she was awarded the Estlander Medal for her significant contributions to Finnish design.

She received two honorary doctorates, in arts (University of Art and Design Helsinki, now part of the Aalto University; 2001) and business (Helsinki School of Economics, now Aalto University School of Business; 2006).
