= Antti Nurmesniemi =

Finnish designer (1927–2003)

Antti Nurmesniemi FRSA, HonRDI
- Born: 30 August 1927; Hämeenlinna, Finland
- Died: 11 September 2003 (aged 76); Helsinki, Finland
- Known for: Interior design
- Spouse: Vuokko Eskolin-Nurmesniemi
- Awards: Professor, Honorary Royal Designer for Industry

Antti Aarre Nurmesniemi (30 August 1927 – 11 September 2003) was a Finnish designer. He is perhaps best known for his coffee pots and his interior design work. He has been referred to as the "Grand Old Man of Finnish Design".

== Background ==
Nurmesniemi studied at the Institute of Industrial Arts and graduated in 1950 as an interior architect. From the 1950s onward, he was one of the most influential figures in Finnish design; he worked from 1951 to 1955 at the architectural offices of Keijo Petäjä and Viljo Revell in Helsinki, and from 1954 to 1955 with Giovanni Romano in Milan.

In 1956, Nurmesniemi founded his own interior and design office, Studio Nurmesniemi, and his versatile skills were recognised early on both in Finland and abroad. He designed interiors for numerous churches (including Hyvinkää Church, 1960), bank offices, commercial buildings, embassies (including in India), hotels (such as the legendary sauna in Palace Hotel in Helsinki, built in 1952 to Revell's designs), and other public buildings. Nurmesniemi was involved in the modernist design of the Palace Hotel from 1951–1953. with Olli Borg and Olavi Hänninen. He was also responsible for the long-term restoration of the interiors of Olavinlinna Castle from 1962 to 1975, as well as the renovation of Eliel Saarinen's creations: Helsinki Central Railway Station from 1975 to 1982, and the City Hall of Lahti in 1982. Other notable works by Nurmesniemi include the interiors of the Finnjet car ferry and the exterior and interior design of Helsinki's orange-colored metro trains, which he planned together with Börje Rajalin in 1979.

In his work, Nurmesniemi celebrated the anonymous and simple design language in the spirit of Alvar Aalto and Kaj Franck. Among his individual design objects, he became known for classics such as the horseshoe-shaped sauna stool for Palace and the red enameled steel coffee pot, designed in 1957 and manufactured by Wärtsilä, where he worked as an industrial designer. Among his last creations in the early 2000s were the blue-colored high-voltage pylons between Salmisaari (Sundholmen) and Meilahti in Helsinki (previously also in Hämeenlinna and other cities, including Turku). As an exhibition architect, for instance at the Milan Triennials and Nordic applied art exhibitions, Nurmesniemi was among the foremost in his field.

Eero Aarnio worked for him for a short time, and they are credited together in at least one source for the Ball Chair design in the 1960s. Mary Quant put the chair in her Bond Street store known for mod fashions. Aarnio also came up with the Bubble Chair, while Nurmesniemi designed the steel and leather covered poly-foam Triennale chair in 1960; Tecta Möbel's F 10 fiberglass, rubber, aluminum and chrome plated steel chair in 1968; the chrome and fabric covered foam Tuoli chair sold by Cassina in 1978; and the wicker and tubular steel D 35 ca. 1984.

Nurmesniemi taught interior architecture at the University of Industrial Arts from 1963 to 1969, and became a professor in 1973. He held an artists’ professorship from 1978 to 1983 and worked as a professor at the Bergen Academy of Art and Design from 1987 to 1989. He received numerous national and international awards, including a silver medal at the Milan Triennial in 1957, the Grand Prix in 1960 (for exhibition design) and again in 1964 (for exhibition design together with Vuokko Nurmesniemi), as well as the Lunning Prize in 1959, among others. He also held many positions of trust, including within the International Council of Societies of Industrial Design (ICSID), where he was a member from 1980, president from 1989 to 1992, and senator until his death. Nurmesniemi was also a central figure in the Finnish Society of Crafts and Design, serving for instance as a board member, and he was responsible for the architectural planning of its annual exhibition in 1955 and its centennial exhibition at the Ateneum in 1975.

He also designed the interior of the Finnish State Guesthouse.

He was married to textile artist Vuokko Eskolin-Nurmesniemi, a designer at Marimekko, with whom he shared many successes. He was awarded the title of professor in 1988 and became an honorary doctor at Kingston Polytechnic in London in 1994, where he also worked as a professor in 1974.

== Gallery ==
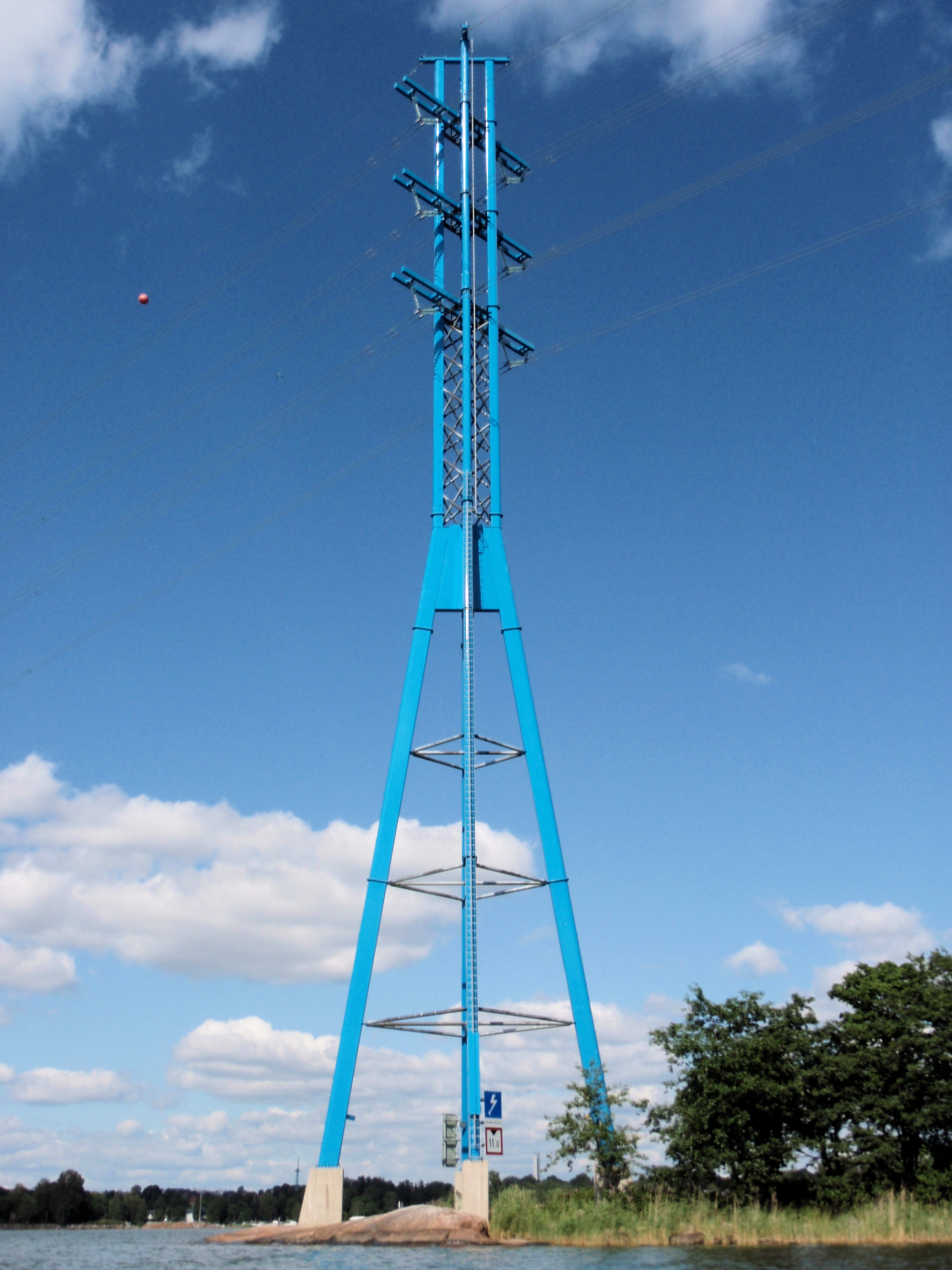
Powerline tower, Taivalluoto island

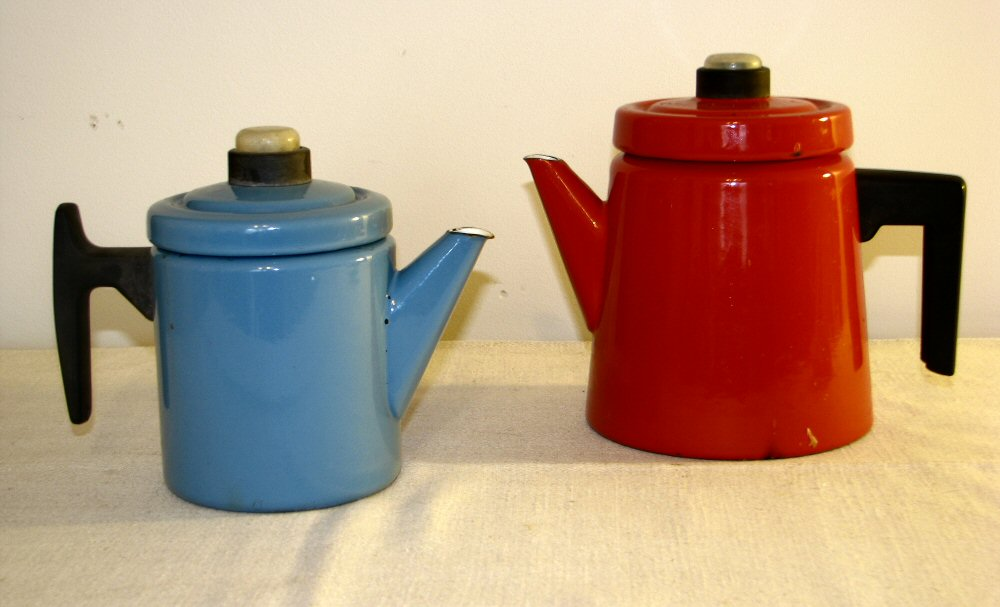
Coffee pots (1957)

High voltage electrical pylons, Espoo

== Awards and recognition ==
- Honorary Royal Designer for Industry, the Royal Society of Arts, London, the United Kingdom (1986)
- Professor (Finland, 1988)

== Publications ==
- Antti Nurmesniemi: ajatuksia ja suunnitelmia (Reflecting and Designing), Kaupungin taidemuseo. (Helsinki) 1992.
