= Armi Ratia =

Finnish designer and businessperson

Armi Maria Ratia
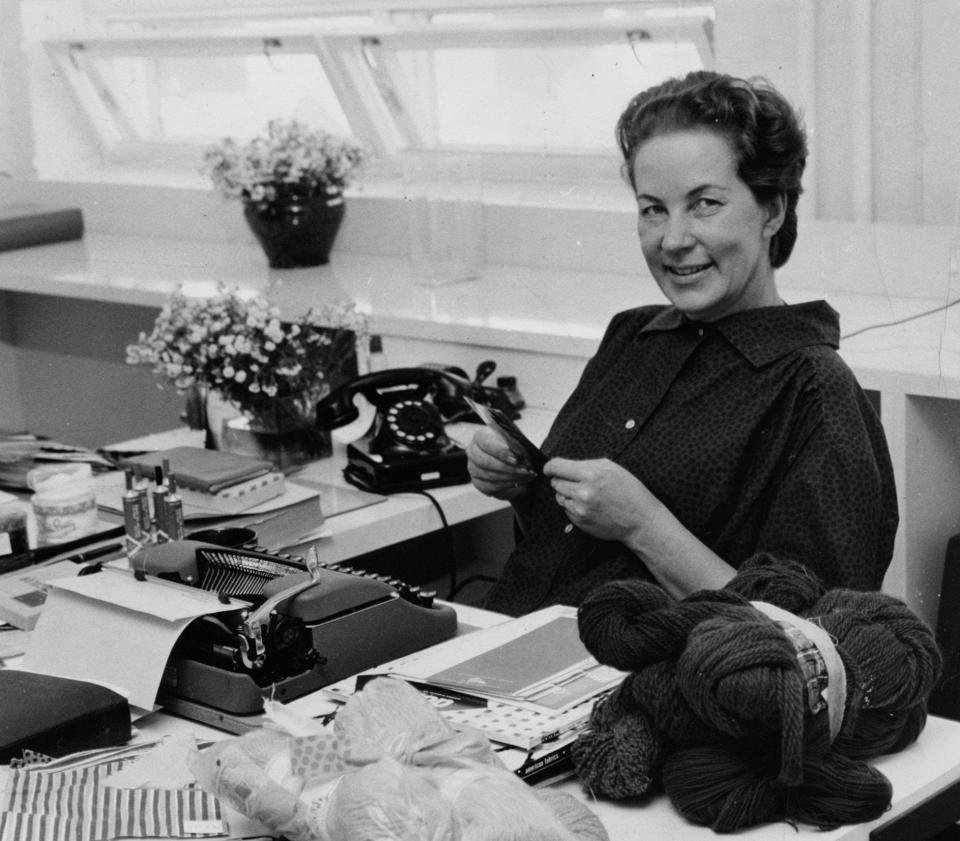
- Ms. Ratia in 1959.
- Born: 13 July 1912; Pälkjärvi, Grand Duchy of Finland
- Died: 3 October 1979 (aged 67); Helsinki, Finland
- Occupations: Businesswoman, co-founder of Marimekko
- Spouse: Viljo Ratia
- Children: Ristomatti, Anttimatti and Eriika

Armi Maria Ratia née Airaksinen (13 July 1912 – 3 October 1979) was a Finnish businesswoman, she was the co-founder of the Finnish textile and clothing company Marimekko Ltd. She is among Finland's most famous female entrepreneurs. She was born in Pälkjärvi in Ladoga Karelia. For a detailed biographical article in the context of her Marimekko company, see The National Biography of Finland entry.

She is buried in the Hietaniemi Cemetery in Helsinki.
