= 2033 in public domain =

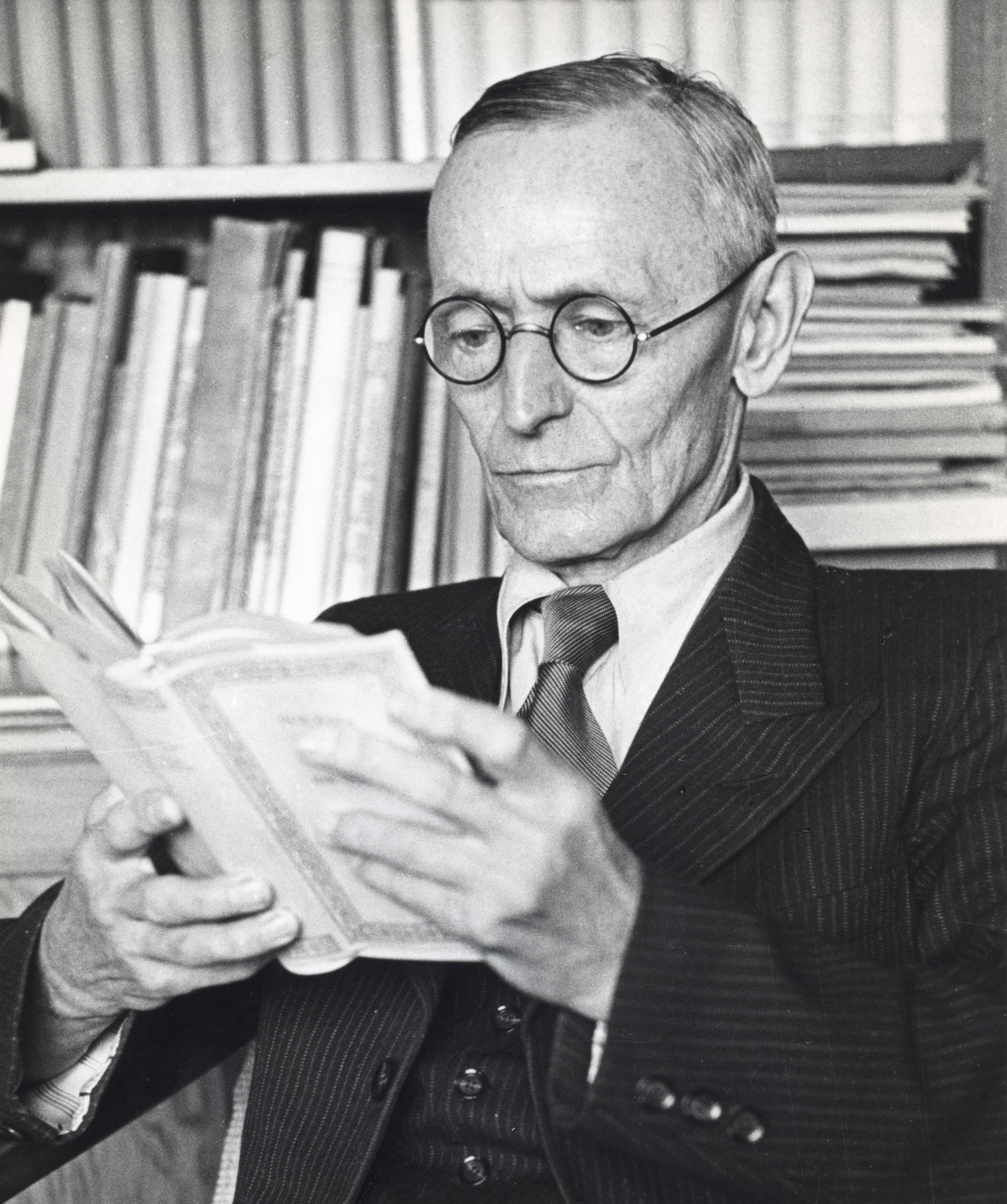
The literature of Hermann Hesse will enter the public domain in Europe in 2033.

When a work's copyright expires, it enters the public domain. Since laws vary globally, the copyright status of some works are not uniform. The following is a list of creators whose works enter the public domain in 2033 under the most common copyright regimes, assuming no further extensions to copyright terms become law in the interim.

== Countries with life + 70 years ==
Except for Belarus (Life + 50 years) and Spain (which has a copyright term of Life + 80 years for creators that died before 1988), a work enters the public domain in Europe 70 years after the creator's death, if it was published during the creator's lifetime. In addition, several other countries have a limit of 70 years. The list is sorted alphabetically and includes a notable work of the creator.

Names	Country	Death	Occupation	Notable work
Enriqueta Arvelo Larriva	Venezuela	10 December 1962	Poet	
Karen Blixen	Denmark	7 September 1962	Author	Works
Paul David Devanandan	India	10 August 1962	Theologian	
Hanns Eisler	Germany	6 September 1962	Composer	Auferstanden aus Ruinen
William Faulkner	United States	6 July 1962	Writer	Bibliography
Mary Gilmore	Australia	3 December 1962	Writer, journalist	Bibliography
Hermann Hesse	Germany; Switzerland	9 August 1962	Poet, novelist	Books
Hu Shih	China	24 February 1962	Academic, writer, and politician	
A. K. Fazlul Huq	Bangladesh	27 April 1962	Politician, writer	
Vilayat Hussain Khan	India	1962	Singer, composer	
M. Visvesvaraya	India	14 April 1962	Civil engineer	

== Countries with life + 60 years ==
In Bangladesh, India, and Venezuela a work enters the public domain 60 years after the creator's death.

Names	Country	Death	Occupation	Notable work
Fatin Abdel Wahab	Egypt	12 May 1972	Film director	
Fernando Amorsolo	Philippines	24 April 1972	Painter	
James K. Baxter	New Zealand	22 October 1972	Writer	Beyond the Palisade
Gabriel Cusson	Canada	18 April 1972	Composer	
Laurence Bradford Dakin	Canada	1972	Writer	
Dulcie Deamer	New Zealand	16 August 1972	Writer	
Eileen Duggan	New Zealand	10 December 1972	Poet, journalist	
Huguette Gaulin	Canada	6 June 1972	Writer	
Chang Hsin-hai	China	6 December 1972	Writer	
Yasunari Kawabata	Japan	16 April 1972	Writer	Snow Country, The Master of Go, The Dancing Girl of Izu, The Old Capital
John T. Kenney	United Kingdom	27 November 1972	Illustrator	The Railway Series
A. M. Klein	Canada	20 August 1972	Poet	The Second Scroll
Norman L. Knight	United States	19 April 1972	SF author	A Torrent of Faces
Laurence Manning	Canada	10 April 1972	Writer	The Man Who Awoke
Liang Sicheng	China	9 January 1972	Architect	
Edward McCourt	Canada	6 January 1972	Writer	
Watchman Nee	China	30 May 1972	Church leader	The Normal Christian Life
Ronald Hugh Morrieson	New Zealand	26 December 1972	Writer	Came A Hot Friday, The Scarecrow
John Pascoe	New Zealand	20 October 1972	Mountaineer, writer	Unclimbed New Zealand
John Reid	New Zealand	31 May 1972	Writer, academic	
Bertrand William Sinclair	Canada	20 October 1972	Writer	The Inverted Pyramid
Kamel el-Telmissany	Egypt	1 March 1972	Film director	
Ramón Valera	Philippines	25 May 1972	Fashion designer	
Ismail Yassin	Egypt	24 May 1972	Actor	

== Countries with life + 50 years ==
In most countries of Africa and Asia, as well as Belarus, Bolivia, New Zealand, Egypt and Uruguay, a work enters the public domain 50 years after the creator's death.

Names	Country	Death	Occupation	Notable work
Louis Aragon	France	24 December 1982	Poet	Bibliography
Theresa Hak Kyung Cha	South Korea; United States	5 November 1982	Novelist, producer, director, artist	Published works
Philip K. Dick	United States	2 March 1982	Science Fiction Writer	Bibliography
Ayn Rand	Russia; United States	6 March 1982	Poet	Selected works

== Countries with life + 80 years ==
Spain has a copyright term of life + 80 years for creators that died before 1988. In Colombia and Equatorial Guinea, a work enters the public domain 80 years after the creator's death.

Names	Country	Death	Occupation	Notable work
Youssef Aftimus	Lebanon	10 September 1952	Architect	Beirut City Hall
Betty Allan	Australia	6 August 1952	Statistician	
August Alle	Estonia	8 July 1952	Writer	
Paul Hastings Allen	United States	28 September 1952	Composer	
Aziza Amir	Egypt	28 February 1952	Screenwriter, actress	A Girl from Palestine
Charles Ancliffe	United Kingdom	20 December 1952	Composer	
Jorge Áñez	Colombia	22 July 1952	Musician, songwriter	"Los cucaracheros"
Céline Arnauld	France	23 December 1952	Writer	
Yury Artsybushev	Russia	12 November 1952	Painter	
Alice Austen	United States	9 June 1952	Photographer	
Frederic Austin	United Kingdom	10 April 1952	Composer, singer	List of compositions by Frederic Austin
Nat Ayer	United States	19 September 1952	Composer	The Bing Boys Are Here, Yes, Uncle!
Mariano Azuela	Mexico	1 March 1952	Writer	The Underdogs
Adivi Baapiraju	India	1952	Writer	
Ferdinand Bac	France	18 November 1952	Writer, artist	
Jimmy Bancks	Australia	1 July 1952	Cartoonist	Ginger Meggs
Bruno Barilli	Italy	15 April 1952	Composer	
Antonieta de Barros	Brazil	28 March 1952	Journalist, politician	
Rudolf Hans Bartsch	Austria	7 February 1952	Writer	
Ioan A. Bassarabescu	Romania	27 March 1952	Writer, politician	
Gaston Baty	France	13 October 1952	Playwright	
Nicolae Constantin Batzaria	Romania	28 January 1952	Writer, politician	
Nikolai Bayev	Armenia	5 August 1952	Architect	Azerbaijan State Academic Opera and Ballet Theater
John Hay Beith	United Kingdom	22 September 1952	Writer	Pip
Zeev Ben-Zvi	Israel	1952	Sculptor	
David Bergelson	Soviet Union	12 August 1952	Writer	
Joseph Berlin	Israel	1952	Architect	Lodzia House
Gino Boccasile	Italy	10 May 1952	Illustrator	
Waldemar Bonsels	Germany	31 July 1952	Writer	Maya the Bee
Giuseppe Antonio Borgese	Italy	4 December 1952	Writer	
Henriëtte Bosmans	Netherlands	2 July 1952	Composer	
Erma Bossi	Germany	14 April 1952	Painter	
Sergei Bortkiewicz	Ukraine	25 October 1952	Composer	List of compositions by Sergei Bortkiewicz
Marjorie Bowen	United Kingdom	23 December 1952	Writer	
Bertram Bracken	United States	1 November 1952	Film director, screenwriter	
E. J. Brady	Australia	22 July 1952	Journalist, poet	The Earthen Floor
Émile Bréhier	France	3 February 1952	Philosopher	
Margaret Wise Brown	United States	13 November 1952	Writer	Goodnight Moon, The Runaway Bunny
Paul Bujor	Romania	17 May 1952	Biologist, writer	
Delfina Bunge	Argentina	30 March 1952	Writer	
Adolf Busch	Germany	9 June 1952	Musician, composer	
Jack Caddigan	United States	1 January 1952	Lyricist	"The Rose of No Man's Land"
Brun Campbell	United States	23 November 1952	Composer	
Adolf Černý	Czech Republic	27 December 1952	Poet	
Theo Champion	Germany	20 September 1952	Painter	
Wilfred Rowland Childe	United Kingdom	1952	Writer	
Howard Chandler Christy	United States	3 March 1952	Painter, illustrator	
Max Clarenbach	Germany	9 July 1952	Painter	
Frederick de Jersey Clere	New Zealand	13 August 1952	Architect	St Mary of the Angels, Wellington
Marie Closset	Belgium	20 July 1952	Poet	
Archie Frederick Collins	United States	3 January 1952	Inventor, writer	The Radio Amateur's Handbook
Jack Conway	United States	11 October 1952	Film director, actor	A Tale of Two Cities
Romain Coolus	France	9 September 1952	Playwright	
André Corthis	France	8 August 1952	Writer	
Annie Sophie Cory	United Kingdom	2 August 1952	Writer	Anna Lombard
Kathleen Coyle	Ireland	25 March 1952	Writer	
Arthur Shearly Cripps	United Kingdom	1 August 1952	Writer, religious leader	
Benedetto Croce	Italy	20 November 1952	Philosopher, historian	Manifesto of the Anti-Fascist Intellectuals
Edward S. Curtis	United States	19 October 1952	Photographer, ethnologist	In the Land of the Head Hunters
Catherine Chisholm Cushing	United States	19 October 1952	Writer	
Sebastião da Gama	Portugal	7 February 1952	Poet	
Surendranath Dasgupta	India	18 December 1952	Philosopher	
Jo Davidson	United States	2 January 1952	Sculptor	
Eugenio de Liguoro	Italy	30 June 1952	Film director, actor	
John Dewey	United States	1 June 1952	Philosopher	John Dewey bibliography
Mikhail Doller	Soviet Union	15 March 1952	Film director, screenwriter	The End of St. Petersburg
Norman Douglas	United Kingdom	7 February 1952	Writer	South Wind
Harvey Dunn	United States	29 October 1952	Painter	
Henry Edwards	United Kingdom	2 November 1952	Film director, actor	
Raymond B. Egan	Canada	13 October 1952	Songwriter	"The Japanese Sandman"
Richard Eichberg	Germany	8 May 1952	Film director	The Tiger of Eschnapur, The Indian Tomb
Alfred Einstein	Germany	13 February 1952	Musicologist	
Otto Eis	Austria	14 January 1952	Screenwriter	
George Grant Elmslie	United States	23 April 1952	Architect	Harold C. Bradley House
Paul Éluard	France	18 November 1952	Poet	
Lydia Field Emmet	United States	16 August 1952	Painter	
Philip G. Epstein	United States	7 February 1952	Screenwriter	Casablanca
Lucien Fabre	France	26 November 1952	Writer	
Ludwig Fahrenkrog	Germany	27 October 1952	Painter	
Jeffery Farnol	United Kingdom	9 August 1952	Writer	The Broad Highway
Arthur Farwell	United States	20 January 1952	Composer	
Itzik Feffer	Soviet Union	12 August 1952	Poet	
Macedonio Fernández	Argentina	10 February 1952	Writer	The Museum of Eterna's Novel
John Flanagan	United States	28 March 1952	Sculptor	
Ernest Florman	Sweden	15 September 1952	Film director	
Hugh Ford	United States	1952	Film director, screenwriter	
Elena Fortún	Spain	8 May 1952	Writer	Celia, lo que dice
Gilbert Frankau	United Kingdom	4 November 1952	Writer	
Charles K. French	United States	2 August 1952	Actor, film director, screenwriter	
Carl Friedemann	Germany	9 April 1952	Composer	"Kaiser Friedrich Marsch"
Svend Gade	Denmark	1952	Film director, screenwriter	
Leonhard Gall	Germany	20 January 1952	Architect	Führerbau
Sawai Gandharva	India	12 September 1952	Singer, teacher	
John Murray Gibbon	Canada	2 July 1952	Writer	Canadian Mosaic
C. P. H. Gilbert	United States	25 October 1952	Architect	
Charles Ginner	United Kingdom	6 January 1952	Painter	
Charles Buxton Going	United States	1952	Engineer, writer	
Percy Gray	United States	10 October 1952	Painter	
Sammy Gronemann	Germany	6 March 1952	Writer	
René Grousset	France	12 September 1952	Historian	The Empire of the Steppes
Ernst Haiger	Germany	15 March 1952	Architect	
Covington Hall	United States	21 February 1952	Activist, writer	
Halfdan M. Hanson	Norway	12 September 1952	Architect	Our Lady of Good Voyage Church
Cicely Hamilton	United Kingdom	6 December 1952	Writer	
Gertrude Demain Hammond	United Kingdom	21 July 1952	Illustrator	
Knut Hamsun	Norway	19 February 1952	Writer, poet	Growth of the Soil
Hildegarde Hawthorne	United States	10 December 1952	Writer	
Sven Hedin	Sweden	26 November 1952	Geographer, travel writer	Through Asia Volume 1
Aaro Hellaakoski	Finland	23 November 1952	Poet	
Fletcher Henderson	United States	29 December 1952	Musician, composer	A Study in Frustration
Graily Hewitt	United Kingdom	1952	Calligrapher, writer	
Laura Coombs Hills	United States	21 February 1952	Artist	
David Hofstein	Soviet Union	12 August 1952	Poet	
Hilda Hongell	Finland	10 June 1952	Architect	
Curly Howard	United States	18 January 1952	Actor	
Felix Huch	United States	6 July 1952	Writer	
Billy Hughes	Australia	28 October 1952	Politician	
Myron Hunt	United States	26 May 1952	Architect	Bridges Hall of Music
Harold Innis	Canada	9 November 1952	Economist	
Horace Jackson	United States	26 January 1952	Screenwriter	
Frederick Jacobi	United States	24 October 1952	Composer	
Rashid Jahan	India	29 July 1952	Writer	Angarey
Alan James	United States	30 December 1952	Film director, screenwriter	
Enrique Jardiel Poncela	Spain	18 February 1952	Writer, playwright	We Thieves Are Honourable
Harry Benjamin Jepson	United States	23 August 1952	Composer	
Frances Benjamin Johnston	United States	16 May 1952	Photographer	
Owen Johnson	United States	27 January 1952	Writer	Stover at Yale
Eugene Jolas	United States	26 May 1952	Writer	
Herbert Juttke	Germany	1952	Screenwriter	
David Kakabadze	Georgia	10 May 1952	Painter	
Fabjan Kaliterna	Croatia	30 January 1952	Architect	
Ariake Kambara	Japan	3 February 1952	Writer	
Aleksandr Kamenskij	Russia	7 November 1952	Composer	
Artur Kapp	Estonia	14 January 1952	Composer	
Bernard Karfiol	United States	16 August 1952	Painter	
Otto Katz	Czech Republic	3 December 1952	Agent, writer	
Elizabeth Kenny	Australia	30 November 1952	Nurse, physical therapist	
Frederic G. Kenyon	United Kingdom	23 August 1952	Historian	
Rollin Kirby	United States	8 May 1952	Cartoonist	
Alexandra Kollontai	Russia	9 March 1952	Politician, writer	Red Love
Sadie Koninsky	United States	2 January 1952	Composer	
Kosugi Tengai	Japan	1 September 1952	Writer	
Vasyl Krychevsky	Ukraine	15 November 1952	Painter, architect	Coat of arms of Ukraine
Masao Kume	Japan	1 March 1952	Writer	
Leib Kvitko	Soviet Union	12 August 1952	Poet	
Gregory La Cava	United States	1 March 1952	Film director	My Man Godfrey
Max Laeuger	Germany	12 December 1952	Architect, ceramicist	
Alfred La Liberté	Canada	7 May 1952	Composer	
Karel Lamač	Czech Republic	2 August 1952	Film director	
William F. Lamb	United States	8 September 1952	Architect	Empire State Building
Rued Langgaard	Denmark	10 July 1952	Composer	Music of the Spheres
Carlos Alberto Leumann	Argentina	1952	Poet	
Heinrich Lilienfein	Germany	20 December 1952	Writer	
Yrjö Lindegren	Finland	12 November 1952	Architect	Helsinki Olympic Stadium
Percy Lindsay	Australia	21 September 1952	Painter	
Julie M. Lippmann	United States	1952	Writer	
Jessie Lipscomb	United Kingdom	12 January 1952	Sculptor	
William J. Long	United States	1952	Writer	
Ferdinand Lot	France	20 July 1952	Historian	
Andrés Luna de San Pedro	Philippines	22 January 1952	Architect	First United Building
Desmond MacCarthy	United Kingdom	7 June 1952	Writer	
J. Farrell MacDonald	United States	2 August 1952	Film director, actor	
Edward Madden	United States	11 March 1952	Songwriter	
Mahjoor	India	9 April 1952	Poet	
Hakob Manandian	Armenia	4 February 1952	Historian	
Anna Margolin	United States	1952	Poet	
Peretz Markish	Soviet Union	12 August 1952	Poet	
Enrique González Martínez	Mexico	19 February 1952	Poet	
H. J. Massingham	United Kingdom	22 August 1952	Writer, poet	
Charles Maurras	France	16 November 1952	Writer	
Achille Mauzan	France	1952	Illustrator	
William Sutherland Maxwell	Canada	25 March 1952	Architect	Shrine of the Báb
J. P. McGowan	Australia	26 March 1952	Actor, film director	The Hazards of Helen, The Hurricane Express
E. H. W. Meyerstein	United Kingdom	12 September 1952	Writer, scholar	
Robert Minor	United States	26 January 1952	Cartoonist	
Mir-Jam	Serbia	22 December 1952	Writer	
Ferenc Molnár	Hungary	1 April 1952	Writer, playwright	The Paul Street Boys, Liliom
Montéhus	France	1952	Songwriter	
Italo Montemezzi	Italy	15 May 1952	Composer	L'amore dei tre re
Maria Montessori	Italy	6 May 1952	Educator	
Irving Morrow	United States	28 October 1952	Architect	Golden Gate Bridge
Lodewijk Mortelmans	Belgium	24 June 1952	Composer	
Willy Mullens	Netherlands	21 April 1952	Film director	
Keith Murdoch	Australia	4 October 1952	Journalist	
Matija Murko	Slovenia	11 February 1952	Literary historian	
Herbert Murrill	United Kingdom	25 July 1952	Composer	
Bangalore Nagarathnamma	India	19 May 1952	Singer, writer	
Ghulam Bhik Nairang	Pakistan	16 October 1952	Poet, politician	
Shinpei Nakayama	Japan	30 December 1952	Songwriter	"Katyusha's song"
Alfred Neumann	Germany	3 October 1952	Writer	
John O'Brien	Australia	27 December 1952	Priest, poet	"Said Hanrahan"
Ivan Olbracht	Czech Republic	20 December 1952	Writer	Nikola Šuhaj loupežník
Herbert Arnould Olivier	United Kingdom	2 March 1952	Painter	
Paul Ondrusch	Germany	29 September 1952	Sculptor	
Joseph O'Neill	Ireland	6 May 1952	Writer	
Vittorio Emanuele Orlando	Italy	1 December 1952	Politician	
Henry Otto	United States	3 August 1952	Film director, actor	
Fulton Oursler	United States	24 May 1952	Writer	The Greatest Story Ever Told
Russell Owen	United States	3 April 1952	Journalist	South of the Sun
Frances Theodora Parsons	United States	10 June 1952	Naturalist, writer	
Jack Parsons	United States	17 June 1952	Engineer, occultist	
Teixeira de Pascoaes	Portugal	14 December 1952	Writer	
Raymond Pech	France	3 July 1952	Writer	
Constant Permeke	Belgium	4 January 1952	Painter, sculptor	
Eva Perón	Argentina	26 July 1952	Politician, actress	La razón de mi vida
Paul Pierné	France	24 March 1952	Composer	
Ladislaus Pilars de Pilar	Poland	22 November 1952	Poet	
Arthur Pink	United Kingdom	15 July 1952	Writer	
Charles Plisnier	Belgium	17 July 1952	Writer	Faux passeports
Pedro Prado	Chile	31 January 1952	Writer	
Chilukuri Narayana Rao	India	1952	Writer	
Hugo Raudsepp	Estonia	17 July 1952	Writer, politician	
Karl Ludvig Reichelt	Norway	13 March 1952	Writer	
Elizabeth Robins	United States	8 May 1952	Writer	
Lou Rogers	United States	11 March 1952	Cartoonist	
Henriette Roland Holst	Netherlands	21 November 1952	Poet	
A. S. W. Rosenbach	United States	1 July 1952	Collector, writer	
William Roughead	United Kingdom	1952	Writer, lawyer	
Joan Rubió	Spain	30 November 1952	Architect	
Edwin L. Sabin	United States	24 November 1952	Writer	
Wadia Sabra	Lebanon	11 April 1952	Composer	
Olaf Saile	Germany	29 June 1952	Writer	
George Santayana	Spain	26 September 1952	Philosopher, writer	The Life of Reason
Garimella Satyanarayana	India	18 December 1952	Poet	
Fred Sauer	Austria	17 September 1952	Film director, screenwriter	
Jurgis Savickis	Lithuania	22 December 1952	Writer	
Alberto Savinio	Italy	5 May 1952	Writer, composer	
Wilhelm Schäfer	Germany	19 January 1952	Writer	
Laurence Dwight Smith	United States	1952	Writer	
Georg Schumann	Germany	23 May 1952	Composer	
Vincent Scotto	France	15 November 1952	Composer	
Philip Walsingham Sergeant	United Kingdom	20 October 1952	Writer	Modern Chess Openings
Franz Seitz Sr.	Germany	7 March 1952	Film director, screenwriter	
Carlo Sforza	Italy	4 September 1952	Politician	
Ilya Shatrov	Russia	2 May 1952	Composer	"On the Hills of Manchuria"
Tatiana Shchepkina-Kupernik	Russia	27 July 1952	Writer, translator	
Vladimir Shcherbachov	Soviet Union	5 March 1952	Composer	
Maria Shkapskaya	Soviet Union	7 September 1952	Writer	
Rudolf Sieczyński	Austria	5 May 1952	Composer	"Vienna, City of My Dreams"
Renato Simoni	Italy	5 July 1952	Playwright	Turandot
Christopher Arthur Smith	Australia	2 March 1952	Architect	Capri Theatre, Peterborough Town Hall
Leo Smith	United Kingdom	18 April 1952	Composer	
Herman Sörgel	Germany	25 December 1952	Architect	
Niles Spencer	United States	15 May 1952	Painter	
Jaap Speyer	Netherlands	1952	Film director	
Fráňa Šrámek	Czech Republic	1 July 1952	Writer	
Malcolm St. Clair	United States	1 June 1952	Film director	
Władysław Strzemiński	Poland	26 December 1952	Painter	
Gusztáv Szerémi	Hungary	16 August 1952	Composer	
Ray Taylor	United States	15 February 1952	Film director	
Giovanni Tebaldini	Italy	11 May 1952	Composer	
Teffi	Russia	6 October 1952	Writer	
Josephine Tey	United Kingdom	13 February 1952	Writer	The Daughter of Time
Jean Tharaud	France	8 April 1952	Writer	
Anna-Lisa Thomson	Sweden	12 February 1952	Ceramist	
Henriette Tirman	France	30 October 1952	Painter	
John Treloar	Australia	28 January 1952	Museum administrator	
Lamar Trotti	United States	28 August 1952	Screenwriter	
Josef Thorak	Austria	26 February 1952	Sculptor	
Uncle Dave Macon	United States	22 March 1952	Singer-songwriter	
Fartein Valen	Norway	14 December 1952	Composer	
Antonio María Valencia	Colombia	22 July 1952	Composer	
Lodewijk van Deyssel	Netherlands	26 January 1952	Writer	
Johan van Hell	Netherlands	31 December 1952	Artist	
Louis Valtat	France	2 January 1952	Painter	
Louis Verneuil	France	3 November 1952	Playwright	
Clara Viebig	Germany	31 July 1952	Writer	
Roger Vitrac	France	22 January 1952	Playwright, poet	
Ellen Roosval von Hallwyl	Sweden	1952	Artist	
Karl Wach	Germany	21 June 1952	Architect	
Lars Israel Wahlman	Sweden	18 September 1952	Architect	Tjolöholm Castle
H. T. Webster	United States	22 September 1952	Cartoonist	Caspar Milquetoast
Adolph Alexander Weinman	United States	8 August 1952	Sculptor	Walking Liberty half dollar, Mercury dime
Percy Wenrich	United States	22 September 1952	Composer	"Sail Along, Silv'ry Moon"
Roland West	United States	31 March 1952	Film director	
Alberto Williams	Argentina	17 June 1952	Composer	Poema del Iguazú
Hans Wittwer	Switzerland	19 March 1952	Architect	ADGB Trade Union School
Paramahansa Yogananda	India	7 March 1952	Yogi, writer	Autobiography of a Yogi
Ellsworth Young	United States	1952	Artist	
Ernst Zahn	Switzerland	12 February 1952	Writer	Frau Sixta
Lee Woodward Zeigler	United States	16 June 1952	Illustrator	

== United States ==
Trailer for the most famous film to enter the public domain in the United States in 2033: Walt Disney's Snow White and the Seven Dwarfs, the first feature film of the Disney Animated Canon.

Under the Copyright Term Extension Act, books published in 1937, films released in 1937, and other works published in 1937 will enter the public domain in 2033. Sound recordings published in 1932 and unpublished works whose authors died in 1962 will also enter the public domain.

The most famous work to enter the U.S. public domain in 2033 is Walt Disney's Snow White and the Seven Dwarfs, the first full-length animated feature produced in the United States. Other significant animated films entering the public domain this year include Disney's Mickey Mouse cartoons Clock Cleaners and Lonesome Ghosts as well as Donald Duck's and Pluto's first solo cartoons, the Silly Symphony short The Old Mill, and the Tex Avery cartoons Porky's Duck Hunt and Little Red Walking Hood, which respectively marked the debuts of Looney Tunes characters Daffy Duck and Elmer Fudd.

Notable live-action films entering the public domain include Best Picture Academy Award winner The Life of Emile Zola starring Paul Muni, The Awful Truth with Irene Dunne and Cary Grant, Jean Renoir's film La Grande Illusion (the first foreign-language film nominated for the Best Picture Academy Award), Victor Fleming's adaptation of Captains Courageous with Freddie Bartholomew and Spencer Tracy, Sidney Franklin's The Good Earth with Muni and Luise Rainer, One Hundred Men and a Girl with Leopold Stokowski in one of his two film appearances, Frank Tuttle's Waikiki Wedding starring Bing Crosby and Shirley Ross, the Alfred Hitchcock film Young and Innocent, the John Ford films Wee Willie Winkie and The Hurricane, Frank Capra's adaptation of Lost Horizon, the Laurel and Hardy comedy Way Out West, Shall We Dance with Fred Astaire and Ginger Rogers, the Marx Brothers comedy A Day at the Races, George Stevens' A Damsel in Distress starring Astaire alongside Burns and Allen, William Wyler's Dead End, Gregory La Cava's Stage Door starring Rogers and Katharine Hepburn, Conquest with Greta Garbo and Charles Boyer, Maytime with Jeanette MacDonald and Nelson Eddy, Broadway Melody of 1938 which marked the breakthrough of Judy Garland, Jean Harlow's final film Saratoga (co-starring Clark Gable), and the musical comedy Hollywood Hotel.

Significant literary works that will enter the public domain include J. R. R. Tolkien's fantasy novel The Hobbit in its original unrevised version, John Steinbeck's novella Of Mice and Men, Dr. Seuss's first children's book And to Think That I Saw It on Mulberry Street, Agatha Christie's Hercule Poirot mystery novels Death on the Nile and Dumb Witness as well as her short story collection Murder in the Mews and Other Stories, Stephen Vincent Benét's post-apocalyptic short story By the Waters of Babylon (under its original title The Place of the Gods), Zora Neale Hurston's novel Their Eyes Were Watching God, the Pulitzer Prize-winning play You Can't Take It with You, Arthur Miller's play They Too Arise, Paul Green's play The Lost Colony, Orson Welles' modernized Shakespeare adaptation Caesar, the Hardy Boys novel A Figure in Hiding, the Nancy Drew mystery stories The Whispering Statue and The Haunted Bridge, Hergé's Tintin story The Broken Ear in its original French black-and-white version, and the first editions of the magazines Look and Tales of Wonder. The characters Prince Valiant and Mrs. Miniver, created by Hal Foster and Jan Struther respectively, will enter the public domain, as will the Disney comic strips introducing Donald Duck's nephews Huey, Dewey and Louie (whose animated debut will become public domain the following year). The first issues of the British children's comic magazine The Dandy will also enter the public domain in the US in 2033, and with them the earliest iteration of its mascot, Desperate Dan as well as the character Korky the Cat.

Works of art entering the public domain in 2033 include Pablo Picasso's oil painting Guernica (as well as René Iché's sculpture of that name) and his comics inspired print-series The Dream and Lie of Franco, Salvador Dalí's The Burning Giraffe and Metamorphosis of Narcissus, René Magritte's Not to be Reproduced, Joan Miró's lost painting The Reaper, Adolf Ziegler's The Four Elements, M. C. Escher's first "impossible reality" woodcut Still Life and Street, and Vera Mukhina's sculpture Worker and Kolkhoz Woman.

Among the popular songs that will enter the public domain are "Hooray for Hollywood" (introduced in Hollywood Hotel as the title song), "Sweet Leilani", "Once in a While", "September in the Rain", "The Merry-Go-Round Broke Down" (best known as the theme music of the Looney Tunes series), and the entire Snow White soundtrack, including its signature tunes "Whistle While You Work", "Heigh-Ho" and "Some Day My Prince Will Come".

== See also ==
- List of American films of 1937
- 1937 in literature
- 1937 in music
- 1962 in literature and 1982 in literature for deaths of writers
- Public Domain Day
- Creative Commons
