= 2003 in public domain =

When a work's copyright expires, it enters the public domain. The following is a list of creators whose works entered the public domain in 2003. Since laws vary globally, the copyright status of some works are not uniform.

== Countries with life + 50 years ==
In most countries of Africa and Asia, as well as Australia, Belarus, Bolivia, Canada, New Zealand, Egypt and Uruguay, a work enters the public domain 50 years after the creator's death.

Names	Country	Birth	Death	Occupation	Notable work
Youssef Aftimus	Lebanon	25 November 1866	10 September 1952	Architect	Beirut City Hall
Betty Allan	Australia	11 July 1905	6 August 1952	Statistician	
August Alle	Estonia	31 August 1890	8 July 1952	Writer	
Paul Hastings Allen	United States	28 November 1883	28 September 1952	Composer	
Aziza Amir	Egypt	17 December 1901	28 February 1952	Screenwriter, actress	A Girl from Palestine
Charles Ancliffe	United Kingdom	1880	20 December 1952	Composer	
Céline Arnauld	France	20 September 1885	23 December 1952	Writer	
Yury Artsybushev	Russia	28 March 1877	12 November 1952	Painter	
Alice Austen	United States	17 March 1866	9 June 1952	Photographer	
Frederic Austin	United Kingdom	30 March 1872	10 April 1952	Composer, singer	List of compositions by Frederic Austin
Nat Ayer	United States	5 August 1887	19 September 1952	Composer	The Bing Boys Are Here, Yes, Uncle!
Mariano Azuela	Mexico	1 January 1873	1 March 1952	Writer	The Underdogs
Adivi Baapiraju	India	8 October 1895	1952	Writer	
Ferdinand Bac	France	15 August 1859	18 November 1952	Writer, artist	
Jimmy Bancks	Australia	10 May 1889	1 July 1952	Cartoonist	Ginger Meggs
Bruno Barilli	Italy	14 December 1880	15 April 1952	Composer	
Antonieta de Barros	Brazil	11 July 1901	28 March 1952	Journalist, politician	
Rudolf Hans Bartsch	Austria	11 February 1873	7 February 1952	Writer	
Ioan A. Bassarabescu	Romania	17 December 1870	27 March 1952	Writer, politician	
Gaston Baty	France	26 May 1885	13 October 1952	Playwright	
Nicolae Constantin Batzaria	Romania	20 November 1874	28 January 1952	Writer, politician	
Nikolai Bayev	Armenia	6 October 1875	5 August 1952	Architect	Azerbaijan State Academic Opera and Ballet Theater
John Hay Beith	United Kingdom	17 April 1876	22 September 1952	Writer	Pip
Zeev Ben-Zvi	Israel	1904	1952	Sculptor	
David Bergelson	Soviet Union	12 August 1884	12 August 1952	Writer	
Joseph Berlin	Israel	1877	1952	Architect	Lodzia House
Gino Boccasile	Italy	14 July 1901	10 May 1952	Illustrator	
Waldemar Bonsels	Germany	21 February 1880	31 July 1952	Writer	Maya the Bee
Giuseppe Antonio Borgese	Italy	12 November 1882	4 December 1952	Writer	
Henriëtte Bosmans	Netherlands	6 December 1895	2 July 1952	Composer	
Erma Bossi	Germany	9 June 1875	14 April 1952	Painter	
Sergei Bortkiewicz	Ukraine	28 February 1877	25 October 1952	Composer	List of compositions by Sergei Bortkiewicz
Marjorie Bowen	United Kingdom	1 November 1885	23 December 1952	Writer	
Bertram Bracken	United States	10 August 1879	1 November 1952	Film director, screenwriter	
E. J. Brady	Australia	7 August 1869	22 July 1952	Journalist, poet	The Earthen Floor
Émile Bréhier	France	12 April 1876	3 February 1952	Philosopher	
Margaret Wise Brown	United States	23 May 1910	13 November 1952	Writer	Goodnight Moon, The Runaway Bunny
Paul Bujor	Romania	2 August 1862	17 May 1952	Biologist, writer	
Delfina Bunge	Argentina	24 December 1881	30 March 1952	Writer	
Adolf Busch	Germany	8 August 1891	9 June 1952	Musician, composer	
Jack Caddigan	United States	21 September 1879	1 January 1952	Lyricist	"The Rose of No Man's Land"
Brun Campbell	United States	26 March 1884	23 November 1952	Composer	
Adolf Černý	Czech Republic	19 August 1864	27 December 1952	Poet	
Theo Champion	Germany	5 February 1887	20 September 1952	Painter	
Wilfred Rowland Childe	United Kingdom	1890	1952	Writer	
Howard Chandler Christy	United States	10 January 1872	3 March 1952	Painter, illustrator	
Max Clarenbach	Germany	19 May 1880	9 July 1952	Painter	
Frederick de Jersey Clere	New Zealand	7 January 1856	13 August 1952	Architect	St Mary of the Angels, Wellington
Marie Closset	Belgium	16 August 1873	20 July 1952	Poet	
Archie Frederick Collins	United States	8 January 1869	3 January 1952	Inventor, writer	The Radio Amateur's Handbook
Jack Conway	United States	17 July 1887	11 October 1952	Film director, actor	A Tale of Two Cities
Romain Coolus	France	25 May 1868	9 September 1952	Playwright	
André Corthis	France	15 April 1882	8 August 1952	Writer	
Annie Sophie Cory	United Kingdom	1 October 1868	2 August 1952	Writer	Anna Lombard
Kathleen Coyle	Ireland	23 October 1886	25 March 1952	Writer	
Arthur Shearly Cripps	United Kingdom	10 June 1869	1 August 1952	Writer, religious leader	
Benedetto Croce	Italy	25 February 1866	20 November 1952	Philosopher, historian	Manifesto of the Anti-Fascist Intellectuals
Edward S. Curtis	United States	19 February 1868	19 October 1952	Photographer, ethnologist	In the Land of the Head Hunters
Catherine Chisholm Cushing	United States	15 April 1874	19 October 1952	Writer	
Sebastião da Gama	Portugal	10 April 1924	7 February 1952	Poet	
Surendranath Dasgupta	India	8 October 1887	18 December 1952	Philosopher	
Jo Davidson	United States	30 March 1883	2 January 1952	Sculptor	
Eugenio de Liguoro	Italy	15 March 1899	30 June 1952	Film director, actor	
John Dewey	United States	20 October 1859	1 June 1952	Philosopher	John Dewey bibliography
Mikhail Doller	Soviet Union	1889	15 March 1952	Film director, screenwriter	The End of St. Petersburg
Norman Douglas	United Kingdom	8 December 1868	7 February 1952	Writer	South Wind
Harvey Dunn	United States	8 March 1884	29 October 1952	Painter	
Henry Edwards	United Kingdom	18 September 1882	2 November 1952	Film director, actor	
Raymond B. Egan	Canada	14 November 1890	13 October 1952	Songwriter	"The Japanese Sandman"
Richard Eichberg	Germany	27 October 1888	8 May 1952	Film director	The Tiger of Eschnapur, The Indian Tomb
Alfred Einstein	Germany	30 December 1880	13 February 1952	Musicologist	
Otto Eis	Austria	19 March 1903	14 January 1952	Screenwriter	
George Grant Elmslie	United States	20 February 1869	23 April 1952	Architect	Harold C. Bradley House
Paul Éluard	France	14 December 1895	18 November 1952	Poet	
Lydia Field Emmet	United States	23 January 1866	16 August 1952	Painter	
Philip G. Epstein	United States	22 August 1909	7 February 1952	Screenwriter	Casablanca
Lucien Fabre	France	14 February 1889	26 November 1952	Writer	
Ludwig Fahrenkrog	Germany	20 October 1867	27 October 1952	Painter	
Jeffery Farnol	United Kingdom	10 February 1878	9 August 1952	Writer	The Broad Highway
Arthur Farwell	United States	23 March 1872	20 January 1952	Composer	
Itzik Feffer	Soviet Union	10 September 1900	12 August 1952	Poet	
Macedonio Fernández	Argentina	1 June 1874	10 February 1952	Writer	The Museum of Eterna's Novel
John Flanagan	United States	4 April 1865	28 March 1952	Sculptor	
Ernest Florman	Sweden	20 September 1863	15 September 1952	Film director	
Hugh Ford	United States	5 February 1868	1952	Film director, screenwriter	
Elena Fortún	Spain	17 November 1886	8 May 1952	Writer	Celia, lo que dice
Gilbert Frankau	United Kingdom	21 April 1884	4 November 1952	Writer	
Charles K. French	United States	17 January 1860	2 August 1952	Actor, film director, screenwriter	
Carl Friedemann	Germany	29 April 1862	9 April 1952	Composer	"Kaiser Friedrich Marsch"
Svend Gade	Denmark	1877	1952	Film director, screenwriter	
Leonhard Gall	Germany	24 August 1884	20 January 1952	Architect	Führerbau
Sawai Gandharva	India	19 January 1886	12 September 1952	Singer, teacher	
John Murray Gibbon	Canada	12 April 1875	2 July 1952	Writer	Canadian Mosaic
C. P. H. Gilbert	United States	29 August 1861	25 October 1952	Architect	
Charles Ginner	United Kingdom	4 March 1878	6 January 1952	Painter	
Charles Buxton Going	United States	4 April 1863	1952	Engineer, writer	
Percy Gray	United States	3 October 1869	10 October 1952	Painter	
Sammy Gronemann	Germany	21 March 1875	6 March 1952	Writer	
René Grousset	France	5 September 1885	12 September 1952	Historian	The Empire of the Steppes
Ernst Haiger	Germany	10 June 1874	15 March 1952	Architect	
Covington Hall	United States	25 August 1871	21 February 1952	Activist, writer	
Halfdan M. Hanson	Norway	30 November 1884	12 September 1952	Architect	Our Lady of Good Voyage Church
Cicely Hamilton	United Kingdom	15 June 1872	6 December 1952	Writer	
Gertrude Demain Hammond	United Kingdom	1862	21 July 1952	Illustrator	
Knut Hamsun	Norway	4 August 1859	19 February 1952	Writer, poet	Growth of the Soil
Hildegarde Hawthorne	United States	25 September 1871	10 December 1952	Writer	
Sven Hedin	Sweden	19 February 1865	26 November 1952	Geographer, travel writer	Through Asia Volume 1
Aaro Hellaakoski	Finland	22 June 1893	23 November 1952	Poet	
Fletcher Henderson	United States	18 December 1897	29 December 1952	Musician, composer	A Study in Frustration
Graily Hewitt	United Kingdom	1864	1952	Calligrapher, writer	
Laura Coombs Hills	United States	7 September 1859	21 February 1952	Artist	
David Hofstein	Soviet Union	12 June 1889	12 August 1952	Poet	
Hilda Hongell	Finland	16 January 1867	10 June 1952	Architect	
Curly Howard	United States	22 October 1903	18 January 1952	Actor	
Felix Huch	United States	6 September 1880	6 July 1952	Writer	
Billy Hughes	Australia	25 September 1862	28 October 1952	Politician	
Myron Hunt	United States	27 February 1868	26 May 1952	Architect	Bridges Hall of Music
Harold Innis	Canada	5 November 1894	9 November 1952	Economist	
Horace Jackson	United States	29 March 1898	26 January 1952	Screenwriter	
Frederick Jacobi	United States	4 May 1891	24 October 1952	Composer	
Rashid Jahan	India	25 August 1905	29 July 1952	Writer	Angarey
Alan James	United States	23 March 1890	30 December 1952	Film director, screenwriter	
Enrique Jardiel Poncela	Spain	15 October 1901	18 February 1952	Writer, playwright	We Thieves Are Honourable
Harry Benjamin Jepson	United States	16 August 1870	23 August 1952	Composer	
Frances Benjamin Johnston	United States	15 January 1864	16 May 1952	Photographer	
Owen Johnson	United States	27 August 1878	27 January 1952	Writer	Stover at Yale
Eugene Jolas	United States	26 October 1894	26 May 1952	Writer	
Herbert Juttke	Germany	1897	1952	Screenwriter	
David Kakabadze	Georgia	20 August 1889	10 May 1952	Painter	
Fabjan Kaliterna	Croatia	20 January 1886	30 January 1952	Architect	
Ariake Kambara	Japan	15 March 1876	3 February 1952	Writer	
Aleksandr Kamenskij	Russia	12 December 1900	7 November 1952	Composer	
Artur Kapp	Estonia	28 February 1878	14 January 1952	Composer	
Bernard Karfiol	United States	6 May 1886	16 August 1952	Painter	
Otto Katz	Czech Republic	27 May 1895	3 December 1952	Agent, writer	
Elizabeth Kenny	Australia	12 September 1880	30 November 1952	Nurse, physical therapist	
Frederic G. Kenyon	United Kingdom	15 January 1863	23 August 1952	Historian	
Rollin Kirby	United States	4 September 1875	8 May 1952	Cartoonist	
Alexandra Kollontai	Russia	31 March 1872	9 March 1952	Politician, writer	Red Love
Sadie Koninsky	United States	1872	2 January 1952	Composer	
Kosugi Tengai	Japan	7 November 1865	1 September 1952	Writer	
Vasyl Krychevsky	Ukraine	12 January 1873	15 November 1952	Painter, architect	Coat of arms of Ukraine
Masao Kume	Japan	23 November 1891	1 March 1952	Writer	
Leib Kvitko	Soviet Union	15 October 1890	12 August 1952	Poet	
Gregory La Cava	United States	10 March 1892	1 March 1952	Film director	My Man Godfrey
Max Laeuger	Germany	30 September 1864	12 December 1952	Architect, ceramicist	
Alfred La Liberté	Canada	10 February 1882	7 May 1952	Composer	
Karel Lamač	Czech Republic	27 January 1897	2 August 1952	Film director	
William F. Lamb	United States	21 November 1883	8 September 1952	Architect	Empire State Building
Rued Langgaard	Denmark	28 July 1893	10 July 1952	Composer	Music of the Spheres
Carlos Alberto Leumann	Argentina	1886	1952	Poet	
Heinrich Lilienfein	Germany	20 November 1879	20 December 1952	Writer	
Yrjö Lindegren	Finland	13 August 1900	12 November 1952	Architect	Helsinki Olympic Stadium
Percy Lindsay	Australia	17 September 1870	21 September 1952	Painter	
Julie M. Lippmann	United States	1864	1952	Writer	
Jessie Lipscomb	United Kingdom	13 June 1861	12 January 1952	Sculptor	
William J. Long	United States	3 April 1867	1952	Writer	
Ferdinand Lot	France	20 September 1866	20 July 1952	Historian	
Andrés Luna de San Pedro	Philippines	9 September 1887	22 January 1952	Architect	First United Building
Desmond MacCarthy	United Kingdom	20 May 1877	7 June 1952	Writer	
J. Farrell MacDonald	United States	6 June 1875	2 August 1952	Film director, actor	
Edward Madden	United States	17 July 1878	11 March 1952	Songwriter	
Mahjoor	India	1887	9 April 1952	Poet	
Hakob Manandian	Armenia	10 November 1873	4 February 1952	Historian	
Anna Margolin	United States	1887	1952	Poet	
Peretz Markish	Soviet Union	7 December 1895	12 August 1952	Poet	
Enrique González Martínez	Mexico	13 April 1871	19 February 1952	Poet	
H. J. Massingham	United Kingdom	25 March 1888	22 August 1952	Writer, poet	
Charles Maurras	France	20 April 1868	16 November 1952	Writer	
Achille Mauzan	France	1883	1952	Illustrator	
William Sutherland Maxwell	Canada	14 November 1874	25 March 1952	Architect	Shrine of the Báb
J. P. McGowan	Australia	24 February 1880	26 March 1952	Actor, film director	The Hazards of Helen, The Hurricane Express
E. H. W. Meyerstein	United Kingdom	11 August 1889	12 September 1952	Writer, scholar	
Robert Minor	United States	15 July 1884	26 January 1952	Cartoonist	
Mir-Jam	Serbia	22 April 1887	22 December 1952	Writer	
Ferenc Molnár	Hungary	12 January 1878	1 April 1952	Writer, playwright	The Paul Street Boys, Liliom
Montéhus	France	9 July 1872	1952	Songwriter	
Italo Montemezzi	Italy	4 August 1875	15 May 1952	Composer	L'amore dei tre re
Maria Montessori	Italy	31 August 1870	6 May 1952	Educator	
Irving Morrow	United States	22 September 1884	28 October 1952	Architect	Golden Gate Bridge
Lodewijk Mortelmans	Belgium	5 February 1868	24 June 1952	Composer	
Willy Mullens	Netherlands	4 October 1880	21 April 1952	Film director	
Keith Murdoch	Australia	12 August 1885	4 October 1952	Journalist	
Matija Murko	Slovenia	10 February 1861	11 February 1952	Literary historian	
Herbert Murrill	United Kingdom	11 May 1909	25 July 1952	Composer	
Bangalore Nagarathnamma	India	3 November 1878	19 May 1952	Singer, writer	
Ghulam Bhik Nairang	Pakistan	26 September 1876	16 October 1952	Poet, politician	
Shinpei Nakayama	Japan	22 March 1887	30 December 1952	Songwriter	"Katyusha's song"
Alfred Neumann	Germany	15 October 1895	3 October 1952	Writer	
John O'Brien	Australia	13 October 1878	27 December 1952	Priest, poet	"Said Hanrahan"
Ivan Olbracht	Czech Republic	6 January 1882	20 December 1952	Writer	Nikola Šuhaj loupežník
Herbert Arnould Olivier	United Kingdom	9 September 1861	2 March 1952	Painter	
Paul Ondrusch	Germany	4 June 1875	29 September 1952	Sculptor	
Joseph O'Neill	Ireland	1886	6 May 1952	Writer	
Vittorio Emanuele Orlando	Italy	19 May 1860	1 December 1952	Politician	
Henry Otto	United States	8 August 1877	3 August 1952	Film director, actor	
Fulton Oursler	United States	22 January 1893	24 May 1952	Writer	The Greatest Story Ever Told
Russell Owen	United States	8 January 1889	3 April 1952	Journalist	South of the Sun
Frances Theodora Parsons	United States	5 December 1861	10 June 1952	Naturalist, writer	
Jack Parsons	United States	2 October 1914	17 June 1952	Engineer, occultist	
Teixeira de Pascoaes	Portugal	2 November 1877	14 December 1952	Writer	
Raymond Pech	France	4 February 1876	3 July 1952	Writer	
Constant Permeke	Belgium	31 July 1886	4 January 1952	Painter, sculptor	
Eva Perón	Argentina	7 May 1919	26 July 1952	Politician, actress	La razón de mi vida
Paul Pierné	France	30 June 1874	24 March 1952	Composer	
Ladislaus Pilars de Pilar	Poland	3 March 1874	22 November 1952	Poet	
Arthur Pink	United Kingdom	1 April 1886	15 July 1952	Writer	
Charles Plisnier	Belgium	13 December 1896	17 July 1952	Writer	Faux passeports
Pedro Prado	Chile	8 October 1886	31 January 1952	Writer	
Chilukuri Narayana Rao	India	1890	1952	Writer	
Hugo Raudsepp	Estonia	13 December 1896	17 July 1952	Writer, politician	
Karl Ludvig Reichelt	Norway	1 September 1877	13 March 1952	Writer	
Elizabeth Robins	United States	6 August 1862	8 May 1952	Writer	
Lou Rogers	United States	26 November 1879	11 March 1952	Cartoonist	
Henriette Roland Holst	Netherlands	24 December 1869	21 November 1952	Poet	
A. S. W. Rosenbach	United States	22 July 1876	1 July 1952	Collector, writer	
William Roughead	United Kingdom	1870	1952	Writer, lawyer	
Joan Rubió	Spain	24 April 1870	30 November 1952	Architect	
Edwin L. Sabin	United States	23 December 1870	24 November 1952	Writer	
Wadia Sabra	Lebanon	23 February 1876	11 April 1952	Composer	
Olaf Saile	Germany	27 August 1901	29 June 1952	Writer	
George Santayana	Spain	16 December 1863	26 September 1952	Philosopher, writer	The Life of Reason
Garimella Satyanarayana	India	14 July 1893	18 December 1952	Poet	
Fred Sauer	Austria	14 December 1886	17 September 1952	Film director, screenwriter	
Jurgis Savickis	Lithuania	4 May 1890	22 December 1952	Writer	
Alberto Savinio	Italy	25 August 1891	5 May 1952	Writer, composer	
Wilhelm Schäfer	Germany	20 January 1868	19 January 1952	Writer	
Laurence Dwight Smith	United States	1895	1952	Writer	
Georg Schumann	Germany	25 October 1866	23 May 1952	Composer	
Vincent Scotto	France	21 April 1874	15 November 1952	Composer	
Philip Walsingham Sergeant	United Kingdom	27 January 1872	20 October 1952	Writer	Modern Chess Openings
Franz Seitz Sr.	Germany	14 April 1887	7 March 1952	Film director, screenwriter	
Carlo Sforza	Italy	24 January 1872	4 September 1952	Politician	
Ilya Shatrov	Russia	1 April 1879	2 May 1952	Composer	"On the Hills of Manchuria"
Tatiana Shchepkina-Kupernik	Russia	24 January 1874	27 July 1952	Writer, translator	
Vladimir Shcherbachov	Soviet Union	24 January 1889	5 March 1952	Composer	
Maria Shkapskaya	Soviet Union	15 October 1891	7 September 1952	Writer	
Rudolf Sieczyński	Austria	23 February 1879	5 May 1952	Composer	"Vienna, City of My Dreams"
Renato Simoni	Italy	5 September 1875	5 July 1952	Playwright	Turandot
Christopher Arthur Smith	Australia	19 November 1892	2 March 1952	Architect	Capri Theatre, Peterborough Town Hall
Leo Smith	United Kingdom	26 November 1881	18 April 1952	Composer	
Herman Sörgel	Germany	2 April 1885	25 December 1952	Architect	
Niles Spencer	United States	16 May 1893	15 May 1952	Painter	
Jaap Speyer	Netherlands	1891	1952	Film director	
Fráňa Šrámek	Czech Republic	19 January 1877	1 July 1952	Writer	
Malcolm St. Clair	United States	17 May 1897	1 June 1952	Film director	
Władysław Strzemiński	Poland	21 November 1893	26 December 1952	Painter	
Gusztáv Szerémi	Hungary	9 May 1877	16 August 1952	Composer	
Ray Taylor	United States	1 December 1888	15 February 1952	Film director	
Giovanni Tebaldini	Italy	7 September 1864	11 May 1952	Composer	
Teffi	Russia	21 May 1872	6 October 1952	Writer	
Josephine Tey	United Kingdom	25 July 1896	13 February 1952	Writer	The Daughter of Time
Jean Tharaud	France	9 May 1877	8 April 1952	Writer	
Anna-Lisa Thomson	Sweden	20 September 1905	12 February 1952	Ceramist	
Henriette Tirman	France	1875	30 October 1952	Painter	
John Treloar	Australia	10 December 1894	28 January 1952	Museum administrator	
Lamar Trotti	United States	18 October 1900	28 August 1952	Screenwriter	
Josef Thorak	Austria	7 February 1889	26 February 1952	Sculptor	
Uncle Dave Macon	United States	7 October 1870	22 March 1952	Singer-songwriter	
Fartein Valen	Norway	25 August 1887	14 December 1952	Composer	
Antonio María Valencia	Colombia	10 November 1902	22 July 1952	Composer	
Lodewijk van Deyssel	Netherlands	22 September 1864	26 January 1952	Writer	
Johan van Hell	Netherlands	28 February 1889	31 December 1952	Artist	
Louis Valtat	France	8 August 1869	2 January 1952	Painter	
Louis Verneuil	France	14 May 1893	3 November 1952	Playwright	
Clara Viebig	Germany	17 July 1860	31 July 1952	Writer	
Roger Vitrac	France	17 November 1899	22 January 1952	Playwright, poet	
Ellen Roosval von Hallwyl	Sweden	1867	1952	Artist	
Karl Wach	Germany	7 January 1878	21 June 1952	Architect	
Lars Israel Wahlman	Sweden	17 April 1870	18 September 1952	Architect	Tjolöholm Castle
H. T. Webster	United States	21 September 1885	22 September 1952	Cartoonist	Caspar Milquetoast
Adolph Alexander Weinman	United States	11 December 1870	8 August 1952	Sculptor	Walking Liberty half dollar, Mercury dime
Percy Wenrich	United States	21 September 1885	22 September 1952	Composer	"Sail Along, Silv'ry Moon"
Roland West	United States	20 February 1885	31 March 1952	Film director	
Alberto Williams	Argentina	23 November 1862	17 June 1952	Composer	Poema del Iguazú
Hans Wittwer	Switzerland	4 February 1894	19 March 1952	Architect	ADGB Trade Union School
Paramahansa Yogananda	India	5 January 1893	7 March 1952	Yogi, writer	Autobiography of a Yogi
Ellsworth Young	United States	1866	1952	Artist	
Ernst Zahn	Switzerland	24 January 1867	12 February 1952	Writer	Frau Sixta
Lee Woodward Zeigler	United States	7 May 1868	16 June 1952	Illustrator	

== Entering the public domain in the United States ==
In the United States, the copyright status of works extends for the life of the author or artists, plus 70 years. If the work is owned by a corporation, then the copyright extends 95 years.

Due to the passing of the Copyright Term Extension Act (Sonny Bono Copyright Term Extension Act) in 1998, works never registered or published before January 1, 1978, and whose authors died before 1933 entered the public domain in this jurisdiction on January 1, 2003. Other works would not enter the public domain here until 2019.

== See also ==
- 1902 in literature, 1932 in literature and 1952 in literature for deaths of writers
- Public Domain Day
- Creative Commons
