= Cachipay (song) =

Song by Jaime Llano González
- Genre: Pasillo
- Songwriter(s): Emilio Murillo

"Cachipay" is a Colombian song in the pasillo genre written by Emilio Murillo. It was popularized through a recording by Jaime Llano González.

In its list of the 50 best Colombian songs of all time, El Tiempo, Colombia's most widely circulated newspaper, ranked the version of the song by Jaime Llano González at No. 19. Viva Music Colombia rated the song No. 25 on its list of the 100 most important Colombian songs of all time.

In addition to the version by González, the song has also been recorded by other artists, including Los Tupamaros, Los Electronicos, Estudiantina De Toñita Mejia, Alfredo Rolando Ortiz, Antonio Rios y Su Conjunto, Los Amerindios de Colombia, Rafael Ramirez, La Banda del Barrilito, Juan Pulido, Orlando Carrizosa y Su Conjunto, Chimizapagua, Jorge Ariza y Su Requinto, Los Guacharacos, Los Millonarios, and Pedro Nel Martínez.
