= Laurence Bradford Dakin =

Canadian writer and poet

Laurence Bradford Dakin (1904–1972) was a writer and poet born in Sandy Cove, Nova Scotia, and lived throughout Europe, eventually moving to Laguna Hills, California, where he died. His best known work was Marco Polo: A Drama in Four Acts (1946), which reportedly sold over 30,000 copies in the United States and was hailed by John Masefield as the "work of a genius." Dakin was published by Obelisk Press. His wife was watercolour painter Ilene Dakin (née Stitchbury). He had a son, Marco Dakin, and a grandchild, Anders Dakin.
