= The Inverted Pyramid (novel) =

1924 novel by Bertrand Sinclair

First edition

The Inverted Pyramid is a 1924 novel by Bertrand Sinclair. It follows the lives of the Norquay brothers, who pursue their fortunes in the logging industry of British Columbia, Canada. It was originally published by Little, Brown, and Co., and was republished by Ronsdale Press in 2011 as part of Vancouver's 125th anniversary.

== Plot ==
The novel follows the Norquay brothers Rod, Phil, and Grove, from 1909 to 1920. They find success in the booming logging sector, and start a trust company, the Norquay Trust. Through greed and mismanagement, the Trust fails and the brother's fortunes are lost. Rod Norquay is the novel's primary protagonist, and his relationship with the potentially mixed-race Mary Thorn provides a romantic element.

== Publication history ==
The novel was originally published by Little, Brown, in a single edition, in January 1924. The publisher had low hopes for sales for the novel; Sinclair was better known for his Western novels, and The Inverted Pyramid was considered a "literary" novel by Little, Brown. They purposefully held the book back to avoid the competitive Christmas book-buying season. Unlike many of his earlier novels, The Inverted Pyramid was not serialized. A "pulp" version was published by A.L. Burt, also in 1924. The book was republished by Ronsdale Press, in 2011. It was selected as one of ten books essential to the history of British Columbia by the Association of Book Publishers of British Columbia and British Columbia Poet Laureate Brad Cran.
