= Enriqueta Arvelo Larriva =

Venezuelan poet (1886–1962)

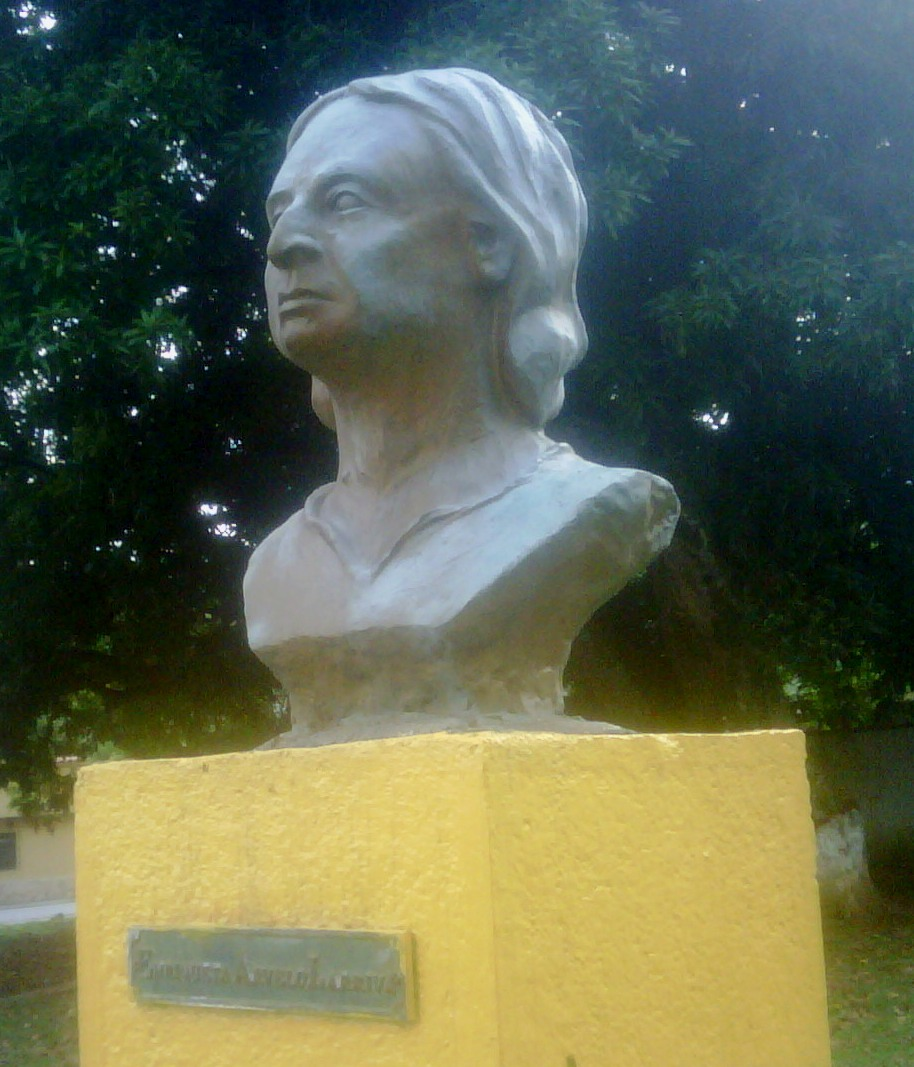
Bust of Enriqueta Arvelo in the Plaza Los Arvelo de Barinitas

Enriqueta Arvelo Larriva (22 March 1886 – 10 December 1962) was a Venezuelan poet. She is considered to be one of the founders of the women's poetry movement in Venezuela and one of the country's principal avant-garde poets.

== Biography ==
Enriqueta Arvelo Larriva was born in Barinitas, Venezuela into a wealthy family. She was a sister of the poet Alfredo Arvelo Larriva. Self-taught, she lived most of her life in Barinitas, working as a teacher and nurse on her family's estate.

She was a member of the Viernes Group of poets. In 1958 she was awarded the Municipal Poetry Prize for her Mandato del canto (1957).

Enriqueta Arvelo Larriva died on 10 December 1962 in Caracas, aged 76.

== Works ==
- Voz aislada (Isolated Voice), 1930
- El cristal nervioso (The Narrow Mirror), 1931
- Poemas de una pena (Poems of Shame) 1942
- El canto del recuento (Counting Song) 1949
- Mandato del canto; poemas, 1944-1946 (Mandate to Sing), Caracas, 1957
- Poemas perseverantes (Persistent Poems), 1963
