= List of compositions by Frederic Austin =

Frederic Austin did not assign opus numbers to any of his music. His published output (apart from The Beggar's Opera, Polly and Perviligium Veneris) consists mainly of song settings for solo voice or chorus, while most of his major orchestral and other works remain in manuscript (see the 'MS' column). Most of Austin's works can be accurately dated, though some (mostly lacking an extant MS) are undated: see the 'Year' column.

== List ==
Year	Genre	Work	MS
1891	solo song	Hark, Hark The Lark, for high voice and piano (after Shakespeare)	MS
1893	chamber	Three Sketches, for cello and piano	pub.
1898	chamber	Piano Trio, for piano, violin and cello (not extant)	
1900	orchestral	Overture Richard II, for orchestra	MS
1903	orchestral	Prelude to a Church Festival, for strings, organ & timpani	MS
1907	orchestral	Spring, Rhapsody for large orchestra	MS
1909	orchestral	Isabella, or the Pot of Basil, Symphonic poem (after the poem by Keats)	MS
1909	solo song	The Twelve Days of Christmas, traditional song arranged for solo voice and piano	pub.
1909	solo song	Home Thoughts From Abroad, for voice & piano (after Robert Browning)	pub.
1909	solo song	It Was a Lover And His Lass, for voice & piano (after Shakespeare)	pub.
1910	solo song	Three songs for voice and piano: 1. Proud Maisie (after Sir Walter Scott); 2. Sigh no nore, ladies (after Shakespeare); 3. My Susan was a Bonny Lass (after H. E. Hunt)	pub.
1910	solo song	When I am dead, my dearest (after Christina Rossetti) for voice and piano	pub.
1911	military band	Music for The Pageant of London (Part III, section 6), for military band: 1. Bartholomew Fair; 2. The Departure of Captain Cook on his last voyage	MS
1913	orchestral	Symphony in E minor, for large orchestra	MS
1913	solo song	Two songs for voice and piano: 1. My Dear Mistress (after John Wilmot); 2. Oft in the Stilly Night (after Thomas Moore)	pub.
1914	piano	Battle Songs of the Allies, arr. for piano: 1. Belgium. La brabanconne - Gallant men of Liege; 2. France. La Marsellaise - Partant pour la Syrie; 3. Russia. Russian national hymn 4. England. The red, white and blue 5. Scotland. The hundred pipers 6. Ireland. Wearin' o' the green 7. Wales. Land of my fathers 8. Great Britain. Rule Britannia - God save the King	pub.
1914	solo song	Songs in a Farmhouse, for soloists, chorus and orchestra; also with piano accomp.: 1. Summer is a-coming in...Chorus; 2. The Poacher...Bass solo and chorus 3. It was a Lover and his Lass (Shakespeare)...Chorus; 4. The Banks of Allan Water...Soprano solo 5. Drink to Me Only (Ben Jonson)...Tenor and semi-chorus 6. Early One Morning...Contralto solo 7. The Ash Grove...Unaccompanied chorus 8. John Peel...Bass solo and chorus	pub.
1916	solo song	The Shepherdess ("She walks, my lady of delight"), for voice and piano (after Alice Meynell)	pub.
1917	orchestral	Palsgaard, Danish sketches for large orchestra: 1. A Feast-Day Procession; 2. The Pool with the Swans; 3. Sailing up the Fjord; 4. The Book of Sagas	pub.
1918	solo song	An Epitaph, for voice, string quartet & piano (after Elizabeth Cary)	pub.
1920	opera	The Beggar's Opera, libretto by John Gay, music by Pepusch, arr. Austin	pub.
1920	orchestral	Incidental music to The Knight of the Burning Pestle by Francis Beaumont, for small orchestra	MS
1920	solo song	Love's Pilgrimage: Three Songs for voice and piano: 1. Had I the heaven's embroidered cloths (Yeats); 2. Terre Promise (Ernest Dowson); 3. Parted Presence (D.G. Rossetti)	pub.
1921	piano	The Enchanted Palace, for piano: 1. The Princess Sings; 2. The Princess Dances	pub.
1921	solo song	To My Fair Lady, for voice and piano	pub.
1921	orchestral	Incidental music for The Red Lamp by W. Outram Tristram for small orchestra	MS
1921	chamber	Incidental music to Will Shakespeare by Clemence Dane, for flute, two violins, and cello	MS
1922	opera	Polly, the sequel to The Beggar's Opera, libretto by Clifford Bax after John Gay, music by Pepusch, arr. Austin	pub.
1923	orchestral	Incidental music to The Insect Play by Karel Čapek, for small orchestra	MS
1923	piano	Suite from The Insect Play, for piano: 1. Waltz on themes from the play 2. One-step; 3. Three-step	pub.
1923	choral	Two May Songs, for unison chorus: 1. Come Listen Awhile; 2. All In The Pleasant Evening	pub.
1923	solo song	Emmeline ("Missing"), for voice and piano (after A. A. Milne)	pub.
1924	orchestral	Incidental music to The Way of the World by Congreve, for small orchestra	pub.
1924	opera	The Bandit, comic opera, libretto by Eden Phillpotts (unperformed)	
1924	voice and orchestra	The Blacksmith's Serenade, humorous scene for voice & ensemble (after Vachel Lindsay)	MS; for a made-for-radio short drama, The Blacksmith's Serenade, which was aired by the British Broadcasting Company on 15 January 1924.
1924	solo song	Two Songs, for unaccompanied voice (after Walter de la Mare): 1. The Song of Soldiers; 2. Wanderers	pub.
1924	solo song	Christmas Eve, for voice and piano (after John Drinkwater)	pub.
1925	opera	Robert Burns, a ballad opera, libretto by John Drinkwater	MS
1926	solo song	Two Songs for voice and piano: 1. Birdlip (Fred. E. Weatherly); 2. A Brave town is Liverpool (H.E. Hunt)	pub.
1926	choral	Two songs for 4-part chorus: 1. Where Shall the Lover Rest?; 2. Who can live in heart so glad? (Nicholas Breton)	pub.
1926	chamber	[Birth melody], for violin and piano	pub.
1927	chamber	Sonata for cello and piano	MS
1927	solo song	Three Wessex Songs, for voice and piano (after Thomas Hardy): 1. When I Set Out for Lyonnesse; 2. Though Dynasties Pass (In time of 'The breaking of nations'); 3. The Fiddler	pub.
1929	solo song	Three Songs of Unrest, for voice and piano: 1. Margaret; 2. In City Streets (Ada Elizabeth Smith); 3. The Sleeper's Song (W.H. Davies)	pub.
1929	choral	It Was and Still My Care Is, (Hymn to the Lares) for 4-part unaccompanied male chorus (after Herrick)	pub.
1930	ensemble	Incidental music for The Devil & the Lady, by Tennyson, for oboe, clarinet, bassoon, timpani and piano	MS
1930	solo song	All About Me: song cycle for voice and piano (after John Drinkwater): 1. Invitations; 2. Mr. Moon; 3. The Difference; 4. Puzzles; 5. John Pride; 6. Riding in Rotten Row	pub.
1930	chorus	Song for City of Oxford School, for chorus and piano (after John Drinkwater)	pub.
1930	solo song	Fond Lover, Cease your Woeful Sighs, for voice and piano (after Clifford Bax)	pub.
1931	chorus and orchestra	Pervigilium Veneris, for chorus and large orchestra (after Tiberianus)	pub.; this was premiered on 8 October 1931 at the Leeds Festival, in the same concert as the premiere of William Walton's Benshazzar's Feast.
1931	solo song	The Fair Circassian, for voice and harp (after Richard Garnett)	pub.
1931	piano	Maids' Delight, Dance Suite for piano: 1. Rigadoon; 2. Running Dance; 3. Jig	pub.
1932	orchestral	Incidental music to Prudence, by Frederick Witney for small orchestra	MS
1932	chorus	Content, for two-part female chorus (after Thomas Dekker)	pub.
1935	chamber	The Fairy Ring, for cello and piano (cello part arranged by Herbert Withers): 1. Titiana; 2. Captain Cockchafer	pub.
1935	orchestral	Overture The Sea Venturers, for large orchestra	MS
1936	orchestral	Robert Burns concert suite for orchestra, adapted from Austin's 1925 opera	MS
1936	solo song	The Sailor's Song, for voice and piano (trad.)	pub.
1940	choral	Four Part-songs for Unaccomanied chorus: 1. Stay, O Sweet (John Donne); 2. Let Us Now Take Time (Robert Herrick); 3. Gather Ye Rosebuds(?) (Robert Herrick); 4. Swedish Drinking song	pub.
1941	solo song	Two Short Songs for bass voice and piano (after Herrick): 1. Born I Was to be Old (Anacreontike); 2. Go I Must (To his Tomb-Maker)	pub.
1943	Film music	Film score for Undercover	
1943	solo song	Serbian Wife's Song, for voice and piano (words by Frederic Austin)	pub.
1944	piano and orchestra	Concertino for piano & orchestra, arr. piano and strings by ?? in 2008	MS
1949	solo song	Orpheus, for voice and piano (after Shakespeare)	pub.
1900 ?	choral	Te Deum, for choir and organ	pub.
1914 ??	voice and orchestra	The Agincourt Song, for baritone, chorus and orchestra	MS
1922 ?	piano	The Moth: dramatic scene for dancing, for piano (MS has some orchestration indications)	MS
1925 ?	piano or orchestra	Theme & Variations, for two pianos (unfinished). Also partially orchestrated by Austin for large orchestra, performing version (approx. 25 minutes) completed by Jeremy Lee-Browne	MS
1935 ?	organ	Organ Sonata (dedicated to Percy Whitlock)	MS
1940 ?	choral	Tyger, Tyger, for unaccompanied 8-part chorus (after Blake)	MS
-	piano	The Sleeping Beauty, for piano	MS
-	piano	The Garden of Delight: Sketches for a (Chinese) ballet, for piano	MS
-	solo song	Three Scotch Songs, for voice and piano: 1. Cam' ye by Athol; 2. Johnny Cope; 3. Culloden	pub.
-	solo song	The Departing Lover ("Sweetest Love, I Do Not Go") for voice and piano (after John Donne)	pub.
-	solo song	Gather Ye Rosebuds, for voice and piano (after Robert Herrick)	MS
-	solo song	Lorna's Song, for voice and piano (after R. D. Blackmore)	
-	solo song	My True Love Hath My Heart, for voice and piano (after Shakespeare)	MS
-	solo song	Three Fool's Songs, for voice and piano (after Max Beerbohm's play 'Savonarola'): 1. "When peas hang green in the garden wall" 2. "Fly home, sweet self" 3. "Wear not the ring, it hath an unkind sting"	MS
-	solo song	Two 17th Century Lyrics, for high voice and piano: 1. Dirge (after Francis Beaumont); 2. Morning Song (after Thomas Bateson)	MS
-	orchestral	Carnaval (Schumann): arrangement for reduced orchestra	
-	orchestral	Giselle (Adolphe Adam): arrangement for reduced orchestra	
-	orchestral	Les Sylphides, ballet by Glazunov after Chopin: arrangement for reduced orchestra	
-	orchestral	The Rhine Maidens: orchestration of W. G. McNaught's SSA arrangement of the opening scene of Wagner's Rhinegold	

== Popular songs by Fred Austin ==
A number of popular and novelty songs with music by a certain "Fred Austin" were published by the Lawrence Wright Music Co. during Frederic Austin's lifetime. They include:

- I do like a Lancashire cocktail
- I'm going back to Himazas
- It’s nice to be home again
- Our heroic family (as sung by Jay Laurier)
- Some girls (are nicer than others) (as sung by Jack Lane)

== Sources ==
- Lee-Browne, Martin (1999), Nothing So Charming As Musick! London: Thames Publishing ISBN 0-905210-97-2
- Gänzl, Kurt: British Musical Theatre, vol. 2 (1915–1984), Oxford: Oxford University Press ISBN 0-19-520509-X
