= Chilukuri Narayana Rao =

Telugu lexicographer and historian

- Born: 1890; Ponduru, Visakhapatnam District, British India
- Died: 1952 (aged 61–62)
- Occupation: Writer
- Spouse: Lakshminarasamma
- Writing career
- Notable works: An Introduction to Dravidian Philology, Aandhra Bhaashaa Charitram; Named dattamandalam(ceded) as Rayalaseema
- Notable awards: Kala Prapoorna

Chilukuri Narayana Rao was a Telugu writer, lexicographer, historian and scholar. He was born to Bheemasenarao and Lakshmamma in 1890 in Visakhapatnam District, British India.

His notable works include Amba, Upanishattulu, Musalamma, Vaade, Borrayyasetti, Gujaraati Vangmayamu. He also published Aandhra Bhaashaa Charitram in the year 1937 and a revised version of Sankaranarayana's English-Telugu Dictionary.

== Awards ==
He received the honorary doctorate degree of ‘Kala Prapoorna' from Andhra University in the year 1947.
