= Faux passeports =

Faux passeports subtitled 'ou les mémoires d'un agitateur' in its original version, is a Belgian novel by Charles Plisnier. It was first published by Corrêa in 1937. It received the prestigious Prix Goncourt, making Plisnier the first foreigner to win the prize.
