= Olaf Saile =

- Born: 27 August 1901; Weitingen, Württemberg
- Died: 29 June 1952 (aged 50)
- Occupation: Writer
- Spouse: Käthe Lambert

Olaf Saile (27 August 1901 – 29 June 1952) was a German writer born in Weitingen, Württemberg. Saile's principal claim to fame is the historical novel Kepler, Roman einer Zeitwende, first published in German in Stuttgart in 1938 and reprinted many times. It is an imagined biography of the life and times of the astronomer and mathematician Johannes Kepler. The novel was translated into English by James A Galston and published in New York City in 1940 by Oskar Piest, under the title Troubadour of the Stars. The novel has occasionally been interpreted as a coded protest against the Nazi régime which Saile had experienced first hand. Following the banning of the Social Democratic Party by the Nazis, in June 1933 as editor of the newspaper Rathenower Zeitung, during the subsequent wave of arrests Olaf Saile was briefly detained in the Oranienburg Concentration Camp, during which time he was maltreated. His release was apparently secured after a friend and fellow-journalist Käthe Lambert used her journalistic credentials to enter the camp and then to write a report detailing conditions there. They subsequently married. Saile died at the age of 50 and was buried in the Church of St. Bernhardt in Esslingen am Neckar. Käthe Saile is buried alongside her husband.

Other books by Olaf Saile include a novel, Und wieder wird es Sommer... (Stuttgart, Fleischhauer & Spohn, 1937), an essay on Swabia, Über den Umgang mit Schwaben, (Verlag E. G. Seeger, Döffingen, 1950; reprinted Stuttgart, Theiss Verlag, 2006), and an anthology of Swabian writing: Saile, Olaf (Hrsg.), Schwäbische Erzähler. Mit 5 Städtebildern aus Stuttgart, Ulm u. Augsburg sowie 30 Bildnissen der Verfasser (Stuttgart, Fleischhauer & Spohn, 1.-6. Tsd., 1937)
