= Laurence Dwight Smith =

American writer

- Born: January 24, 1895; Detroit, MI
- Died: September 4, 1952 (aged 57); Albany, NY
- Citizenship: United States
- Education: Yale College
- Occupation: Author
- Writing career
- Years active: c. 1935–1952
- Genre: Crime fiction
- Subject: Cryptography

Laurence Dwight Smith (1895-1952) was an American author specializing in crime fiction and cryptography.

== Early life and education ==
Smith was born in Detroit, Michigan on January 24, 1895. After completing preparatory school at the Phillips Academy in 1914, he attended Yale College and, after graduating, took a job with the Winchester Repeating Arms Company in New Haven, Connecticut as a machinist. He married Kathryn Marsh of New York City in August 1917, and in January 1918 he enlisted in the U.S. Army. Having been promoted to sergent in the Corps of Intelligence Police during World War I, he was discharged after the war in September 1919 at the age of 24.

== Works ==
=== Fiction ===
- Death is thy neighbour, 1938
- Girl Hunt Red Arrow Books, 1939
- The G-Men Smash the Professor's Gang, Illustrated by Robb Beebe, 1936, Grosset & Dunlap
- The G Men in Jeopardy. Illustrated by Milton Marx. 1938. Grosset & Dunlap.
- The G-Men trap the Spy Ring Illustrated by Paul Laune. 1939. Grosset & Dunlap
- Mystery of the Yellow Tie, 1939
- Hiram and other Cats, Grosset & Dunlap, 1941
- Adirondack Adventure, 1945
- Reunion, Samuel Curl Inc, 1946

=== Non-fiction ===
- Cryptography - the science of secret writing, W. W. Norton & Company, New York, 1943 (US); George Allen and Unwin, London, 1944 (UK)
- Hooked - Narcotics: America's Peril, with Rafael de Soto, 1953
- Cryptography W.W Norton and Co, 1971
- Counterfeiting - crime against the people, 1944
