= Maria Shkapskaya =

Russian and Soviet writer (1891–1952)

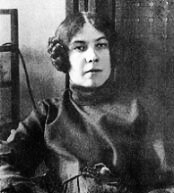
- Born: 15 October 1891; Saint Petersburg, Russia
- Died: 7 September 1952 (aged 60); Moscow, Soviet Union
- Writing career
- Notable work: No Dream

Maria Mikhailovna Shkapskaya (Russian: Мария Михайловна Шкапская; 15 October 1891 – 7 September 1952) was a Russian and Soviet poet and journalist. She was a member of the Petrograd Poets Union.

== Early life ==
Maria was born in Saint Petersburg in 1891, the youngest of five children. Her parents were educated and cultured, but the family struggled financially, depending on her father's small pension. Her mother suffered from paralysis and her father had retired from a minor government position due to mental illness. As a girl she attended school at the gymnasium on Vasilyevsky Island. She wrote her first essay at the age of nine. She began working at the age of 11, doing laundry, writing addresses at the post office, tutoring, and serving the actresses of a Ukrainian company. Her political education began at school, where she participated in a student reading group and published poetry in the group's journal. She graduated from the gymnasium with distinction in 1910.

She married in 1910 and lived with her husband in Pskov. Here she participated in a study of the lake region organized by her husband's father. She conducted interviews and polls, and, as a hobby, collected a list of more than 200 dialectisms. This experience helped her later on in her journalistic work. She and her husband also joined a local Marxist circle.

== Career ==
In 1910, she published a fable in the newspaper Narva Leaflet and a poem on the death of Leo Tolstoy in Pskovian Life. In 1911, she enrolled in the department of general medicine at the Saint Petersburg Psycho-Neurological Institute, but only remained there for a year. She was arrested twice in 1912, once for taking part in a demonstration and again with her husband for participating in a student political organization. She and her husband were sentenced to three years of exile. A merchant philanthropist gave all of the defendants in the case scholarships so that they could continue studying in exile.

Shkapskaya and her husband spent three years in France, where she completed a course in literature at the University of Toulouse in 1914, and attended lectures at the School of Oriental Languages in Paris. During this time, she published her poetry in Saint Petersburg journals with the help of recommendations from Vladimir Korolenko, who she had met in Paris. While in Paris, she also met Maximilian Voloshin and Ilya Ehrenburg.

After the outbreak of World War I, she worked in organizations for the aid of Belgian and French refugees. Her observations provided her with material for a collection of four essays titled Over Here and Over There, published upon her return to Russia in 1916. She was shocked by the corruption and greed she found in Russia. She published several essays in 1916 making unfavorable comparisons between Russia and France. She and her husband experienced both red and white terror during the Russian Civil War, and by 1919, they had two sons. In 1920, she was accepted into the Petrograd Poets Union, and in 1921, she worked with Alexander Blok.

From 1916 to the early 1920s, she published poetry with the themes of faith, motherhood, and lost love. After this, her work began to take on a more propagandistic and ideological tone. Her collection of poetry Blood-Ore (1923) received several outspoken reviews; Valery Bryusov expressed disappointment, while Maxim Gorky praised the writer and her work for giving the woman's experience a new voice. Her book Tsa Tsa Tsa appeared in 1923. In 1925, she published a collection of nursery rhymes Alyosha's Galoshes, and her last collection of poetry The Earthly Crafts. In December 1925, she joined the staff of Red Newspaper, where she worked as a reporter for eight years. She was a prolific writer and erudite researcher, praised for the dynamic "cinematographic" technique of her writing style. Her works also appeared in Pravda and other prominent journals. In 1927 Vera Inber praised her as one of the four best Soviet journalists. Her third child, a daughter, was born in 1928.

== Later life ==
From 1931 to 1936, she participated in the huge project started by Gorky, The History of Factories and Plants. The project involved thousands of writers from across the Soviet Union. Shkapskaya worked on the Karl Marx Factory in Leningrad, founded in 1832 by Gustav Lessner. Her book Lessner's Workers was never published in full, with only excerpts being published in various newspapers. This was her favorite project. After 1929 her poems were no longer published in the Soviet Union, and in 1934, she renounced her former poetry as "socially uninformed".

She moved to Moscow in 1937. After World War II, she worked as an editor for the Anti-Fascist Committee of Soviet Women, while suffering from ill-health, overwork, and accidental injuries. Her younger son, taken prisoner during the war, was sent to the Gulag in 1950. Shkapskaya died in September 1952.

== English translations ==
- No Dream, (narrative poem), from An Anthology of Russian Women's Writing, 1777-1992, Oxford University Press, 1994.
- ’’Mariya Shkapskaya, The Mother and the Stern Master, Selected Poems’’ translated and introduced by Sandra Shaw Bennett, Astra Press 1998, ISBN 0-946134-52-9
