= Gusztáv Szerémi =

Hungarian musician

Gusztáv Szerémi (Hungarian: Szerémi Gusztáv; also Gustave Szerémi, Gustav Szerémi; 9 May 1877 in Budapest – 16 August 1952 in Budapest) was a Hungarian violinist, violist and composer.

Szerémi was professor of violin and viola at the Royal National Hungarian Academy of Music (Országos Magyar Királyi Zeneakadémia, now the Franz Liszt Academy of Music) in Budapest around the turn of the 20th century. His pedagogical works for viola were introduced as the official curriculum of the Academy.

== Selected works ==
Concertante

- Concerto No. 1 in F major for viola (viola alto) and orchestra, Op. 6 (published 1890s)
- Concerto No. 2 in g minor for viola (viola alto) and orchestra, Op. 57 (1911)
- Concertino No. 1 in G major for violin and orchestra, Op. 63
- Concertino No. 2 in E minor for violin and orchestra, Op. 64
- Concertino No. 3 in D major for violin and orchestra, Op. 65

Chamber music

- Rêverie for viola (viola alto) and piano, Op. 2
- Souvenir, Morceau de salon for violin and piano, Op. 3
- Rêverie in F major for violin and piano, Op. 5
- Öt előadást képző könnyü hegedűdarab (5 Easy Concert Pieces in Positions I–V; 5 Leichte Vortragstücke von I. bis V. Lage) for violin and piano, Op. 5

1. Gyermekjelenet (Kinderscene)
2. Barcarolle
3. Valse
4. Romance (Romanze)
5. Marcia

- Trois morceaux lyriques (3 Lyric Pieces) for viola (viola alto) and piano, Op. 33

1. Souvenir in B♭ major
2. Chanson triste in E minor
3. Prière in E♭ major

- Scherzo in A minor for 3 violins, Op. 51
- Cinq amusements pour les jeunes artistes de violon (5 Recreations for Young Artists of the Violin), Op. 58

1. Menuetto in B♭ major
2. Berceuse in G minor
3. Scherzo in E♭ major
4. Gavotte in A major
5. Marcia in E♭ major

- Mélodie, Morceau de salon (Salon Piece) for cello and piano, Op. 61

Pedagogical

- 12 fokozatos tanulmány a technika fejlesztésére (12 Technical Studies; Zwölf technische Studien) for violin and piano, Op. 12
- 24 fokozatos tanulmány a technika fejlesztésére (24 Progressive Studies; 24 Études progressives) for viola, Op. 56

Volume 1 (Nos.1–12): Positions I through III
Volume 2 (Nos.13–24): Positions I through V

- Eleméleti és gyakorlati mélyhegedű-iskola (Elementary and Practical Viola Method)
- Eleméleti és gyakorlati uj nagy brácsaiskola (Elementary and Practical New High Viola Method)
- A mélyhegedűjáték főiskolája, Kamarazene-tanulmányok régibb és modern mesterek műveiből, 2 kötetben, Az akadémiai osztályok használatára (The High School of Viola Playing)

I. kötet: Haydn–Volkmann (Volume 1: From Haydn to Volkmann)
II. kötet: Bruckner–től napjainkig (Volume 2: From Bruckner Onward)

== Sources ==
- Rozsnyai Károly könyv-és zeneműkiadóhivatala (Károly Rozsnyai Book and Music Publisher), Budapest
