= Karl Wach =

German architect

- Born: 7 January 1878; Höchst, Germany
- Died: 21 June 1952 (aged 74); Düsseldorf, Germany
- Occupation: Architect

Karl Wach (7 January 1878 – 21 June 1952) was a German architect. His work was part of the architecture event in the art competition at the 1936 Summer Olympics.
