= Theo Champion =

German painter

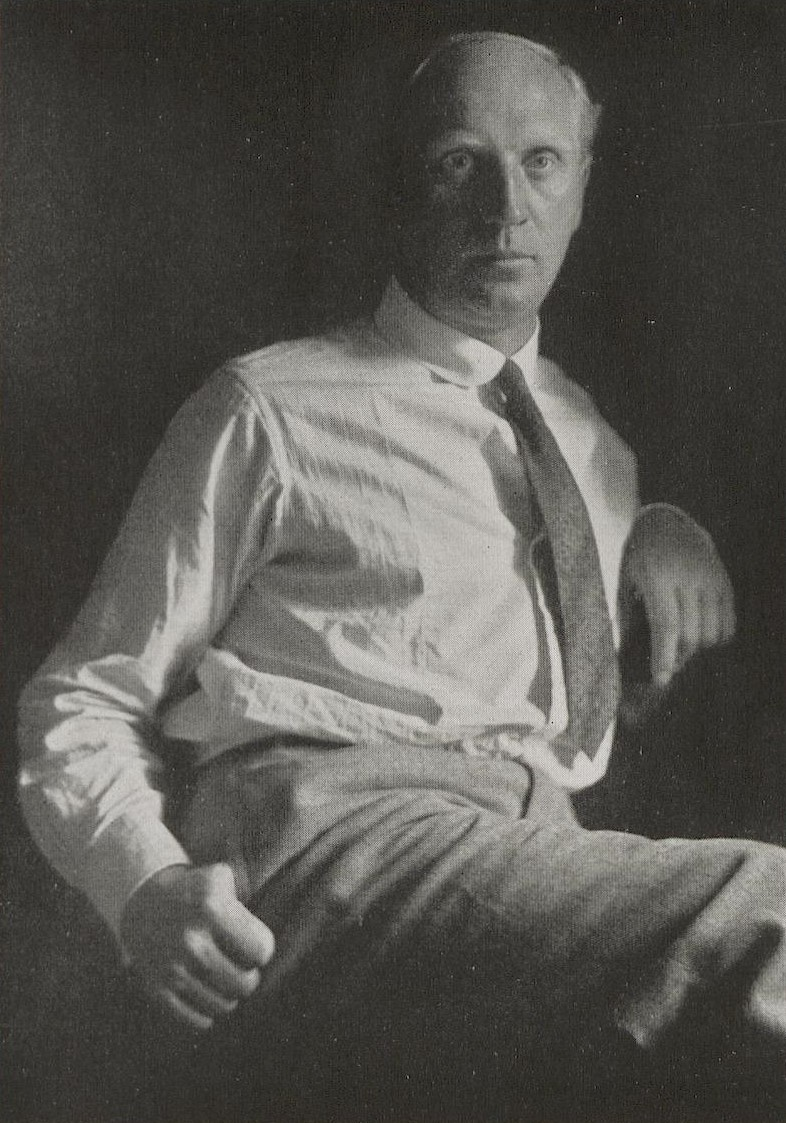
- Born: 5 February 1887; Düsseldorf, Germany
- Died: 20 September 1952 (aged 65); Zell an der Mosel, Germany
- Occupation: Painter

Theo Champion (5 February 1887 – 20 September 1952) was a German painter. His work was part of the painting event in the art competition at the 1928 Summer Olympics.
