= Montéhus =

French singer-songwriter (1872-1952)

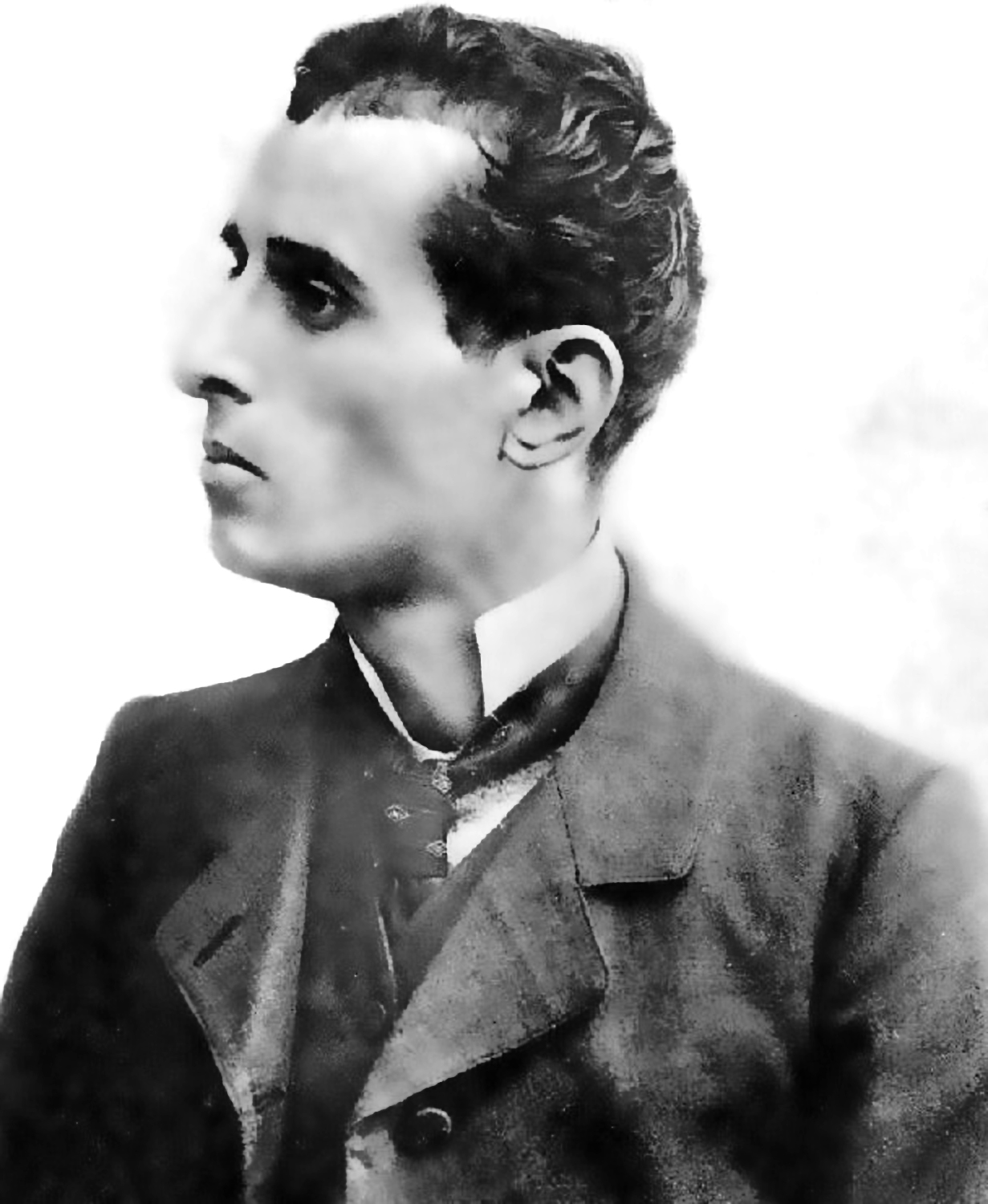
Montéhus

Gaston Mardochée Brunswick, better known by his pseudonym Montéhus (9 July 1872 – December 1952), was a French singer-songwriter. He was the writer of such notable songs as "Gloire au 17ème" and "La Butte Rouge".

== Biography ==
Montéhus was the eldest child of 22 in an impoverished working-class family of Jewish descent.

=== A Child of the Commune ===
Montéhus was born in Paris after the Paris Commune of 1871. According to him, his father Abraham Brunschwig had been among the rebels, but there is no source to verify this claim. Nevertheless, Montéhus was raised in a post-Commune context, which accounts for his commitment to left-wing politics. "Revolutionary jingoist" as he liked to present himself, he was close to the "wretched of the Earth" spoken of by Eugène Pottier in L'Internationale.

He began to sing in public at the age of 12, in 1884, a decade before the beginning of the Dreyfus Affair. He published his first song (Au camarade du 153ème) in 1897. It was then that he adopted his pseudonym, easier to bear than his name in the context of strong antisemitism. In 1907, he published Gloire au 17ème in honour of the regiment of soldiers who refused to fire on a demonstration of wine growers in Béziers.

=== A Committed Singer ===
In the second half of the 19th century, the song was central to the popular culture. Books, expensive as they were, were not accessible to the working classes. When it contained a strong political element, the song could be a powerful tool of propaganda. Montéhus was one of the singers of the red revolt, along with Jean-Baptiste Clément (1836–1903), writer of the song Le Temps des cerises, Eugène Pottier (1816–1887), writer of L'Internationale, Jules Jouy (1855–1897), writer of V'là l'choléra qu'arrive, Les Anarchistes de Chicago, Pierre Dupont (1821–1870), Le chant des ouvriers, Le chant du vote, Gaston Couté (1880–1911) Le gars qu'a mal tourné, etc.

In his lively, driven songs, Montéhus opposed war, capitalist exploitation, prostitution, poverty, religious hypocrisy, but also the income tax:

Au lieu d'imposer l'travailleur qui enrichit l'gouvernement
Imposez plutôt les noceurs [les capitalistes] qui gaspillent tant d'argent.

He also defended the cause of women in a remarkable way. La grève des Mères (The Mothers' Strike) was legally banned on 5 October and Montéhus condemned for "incitement to abortion".

On 5 March 1902, he is initiated into Freemasonry at ″l'Union de Belleville″ lodge in Paris. And when he considered joining the Communist Party in 1922, as the French Communist Party did not accept Freemasons, he preferred to remain faithful to his lodge.

=== A Friend of Lenin ===
Montéhus maintained relations with Vladimir Lenin; moreover, the latter made reference to this in his correspondence. In a letter to Lev Kamenev, Lenin wrote: "Ah! If I could listen to Montéhus again!". At the time of his exile in France (between 1909 and 1912), Lenin gave a series of conferences in a room of either the Rive Gauche or Bobino (the places is uncertain). At Lenin's request, Montéhus sang in the first part to attract a sizable audience. The people who came to listen to the "humanitarian singer" were also invited to listen to the Bolshevik activist after the intermission. The relations between art and politics prefigured the agitprop (art in the service of political discourse and/or ideology) put in place in the USSR beginning in the 1920s.

=== A Revolutionary Jingoist ===
During the First World War, Montéhus, like many others, underwent a radical change of political opinion. He made himself the zealous changer of the Union Sacrée and sang militarist songs. One may draw a comparison with the painting of Picasso, who in the same period renounced cubism (considered "too German") for a more academic style (considered "French"). It was then that Montéhus sang La Guerre finale, a grotesque détournement of L'Internationale:

"Et maintenant tous à l'ouvrage
Amis, on ne meurt qu'une fois !"

Similarly, in Lettre d'un Socialo (sung to the tune of L'air du Clairon by Paul Déroulède), he explained that the time had come for La Marseillaise, while waiting to be able to sing L'Internationale once again:

Nous chantons La Marseillaise
Car dans ces terribles jours
On laisse L'Internationale
Pour la victoire finale
On la chantera au retour.

Montéhus was the image of the working people, who left en masse for the front contrary to the fears of the state adjutant who had overestimated the workers' commitment to pacifism.

In a song impregnated with the racism of his time, entitled L'Arbi, Montéhus held xenophobic intentions:

Moi li sait bien, toi pas voulu guerre
Toi, li Français, c'est kif kif le bon Dieu.

Plus loin :

Moi suis content voir Paris : J'suis content, c'est bézef bonno
A couper cabêche aux sales Pruscots
car eux, du tout, pas gentils
As pas peur, as pas peur, Sidi
Si Pruscots venir, moi coupe kiki.

During these four years of war, he did not cease to compose warlike songs (La Dernière victime, La Voix des mourants, La Vision sanglante, Debout les Morts !, etc.), he would never be mobilised and thus never know the horrors of the front. On the other hand, on the stage of the Olympia, he was wounded in the head singing warlike songs. At the end of the war in 1918, for his good and loyal services, he received the Croix de Guerre.

=== Disgrace ===
After the war, Montéhus faced a rather long period of disgrace. He ceased to enroll in the Popular Front. He would attempt to redeem himself in 1923 by composing La Butte Rouge (The Red Mound), which makes reference to the Mound of Bapeaume, theatre of violent battles at the Somme during the offensive of the summer of 1916 (and not, contrary to a common error, the Paris Commune of 1871, strongly evoked in the work of de Montéhus). In this song, he takes on those responsible for the carnage:

[...] car les bandits qui sont cause des guerres
n'en meurent jamais, on ne tue qu'les innocents.

=== Support for the Popular Front ===
During the 1930s, he was a member of the French Section of the Workers' International (SFIO). At the advent of the Popular Front, at the age of 64, Montéhus was again at the forefront with Le décor va changer, Vas-Y Léon !", Le Cri des grévistes, L'Espoir d'un gueux, songs in which he supported the Popular Front and Léon Blum.

=== Under the Vichy Regime ===
Montéhus was not sent to a concentration camp, but he was forced to wear the yellow star from 1942 until the Liberation of France. In 1944, he wrote the Chant des Gaullistes (Song of the Gaullists).

=== After the Liberation ===
He received the Legion of Honour from Paul Ramadier in 1947. Nevertheless he was all but forgotten in show business, and was supported only by his family when he died in 1952 in Paris.

== Citations ==
=== Gloire au 17ème – 1907 ===
Salut, salut à vous,
Braves soldats du 17ème;
Salut, braves pioupious,
Chacun vous admire et vous aime;
Salut, salut à vous,
À votre geste magnifique;
Vous auriez, en tirant sur nous,
Assassiné la République.

=== Lettres d'un socialo – 1914 ===
Certes cela est pénible
Quand on a le cœur sensible
De voir tomber les copains
Mais quand on est sous les armes
On n'doit pas verser de larmes
On accepte le destin.

=== La Butte Rouge – 1919 ===
La Butt’ Rouge, c’est son nom, l’baptême s’fit un matin
Où tous ceux qui montaient roulaient dans le ravin.
Aujourd’hui y’a des vignes, il y pousse du raisin.
Qui boira ce vin là, boira l’sang des copains.

== Book ==
Rémy Wermester : "Montéhus La lutte en chantant" Editions Elzévir (November 2012) : In the same time, biography, bibliography of the writer under historic ground from "La Belle Epoque" to "Trente Glorieuses".

== Bibliography ==
Marc Robine : « Montéhus, Le chansonnier humanitaire. Enregistrements originaux 1905–1936 » EPM, Paris.
