= Kathleen Coyle =

Irish novelist (1886–1952)

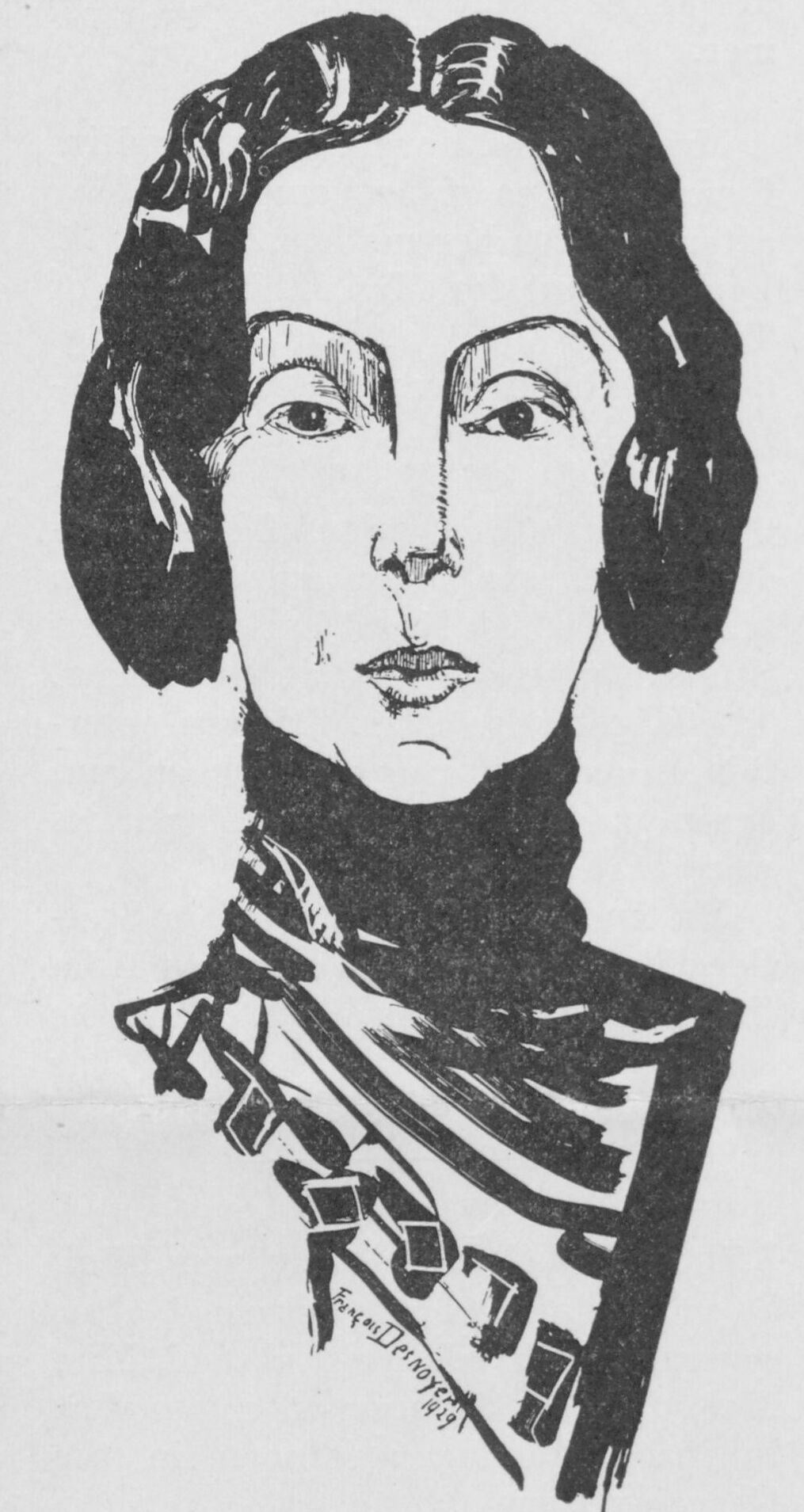
- Kathleen Coyle (from a drawing by Francois Desnoyer)
- Born: 23 October 1886; Derry, Ireland
- Died: 25 March 1952 (aged 65); Philadelphia, United States
- Notable work: A Flock of Birds (1930), The Magical Realm (1943)

Kathleen Coyle (23 October 1886 – 25 March 1952) was an Irish novelist, best known for her autobiographical work.

== Early life ==
Kathleen Coyle was born in Derry on 23 October 1886. She was the eldest child of John and Catherine Coyle (née McKenna). Catherine Coyle was born in New York City, but was brought up in Ireland and had Irish roots. The Coyle family was initially wealthy, but Kathleen Coyle's autobiography, The Magical Realm, details the decline of their fortunes, in particular how her father had no occupation and instead lived on his wife's inheritance. John Coyle was an alcoholic and died young in his 40s. Coyle suffered an injury in childhood which resulted in a permanent limp. Coyle was primarily educated privately at home, receiving some schooling in a local convent. She spent three weeks at the Young Ladies' Academy in Derry, but left as her family could not afford the fees. In 1906, her mother sold the family home in Glendermott and moved to Liverpool. Whilst there, Coyle worked in a public library. Three years later, in 1909, the Coyles moved to London, and in an effort to support her family Coyle took up employment in a newspaper office. It was during this time in London that Coyle met Rebecca West, with West noting that she was "impressed and almost alarmed by her endowment of poetic sensitivity."

== Activism and writing ==
Coyle returned to Ireland in 1911, and whilst in Ireland she became involved in the socialist movement. Under the name Selma Sigerson, Coyle co-wrote a pamphlet entitled Sinn Fein and socialism with James Connolly that was published in 1919. It was through this movement she met her husband, Charles O'Meagher. They were married in 1915, and had a son, Kestrel, and a daughter, Michele. They separated in 1919, when Coyle returned to London to live with her mother. At this time Coyle became active in the suffragist movement. Wanting to focus on developing a writing career, she placed her children in foster care, moved out from her mother's house to a rented room. She published her first book, Piccadilly, in 1923. In 1923, she moved to Ostend with her children, later moving to Antwerp, then to Paris in 1926. It was in Paris she became an acquaintance of James Joyce and Nora Barnacle. From 1926 onwards, Coyle produced a steady number of novels, which she stated were written to earn money rather than for literary merit. A Flock of Birds (1930) was entered by Jonathan Cape for a literary prize, which came second to E. M. Forster's A Passage to India. Other works by her that have been lauded by critics are Liv (1928), and her autobiography, The Magical Realm (1943).

== Selected writings ==
=== Novels ===
- Picadilly, Dutton (New York, NY), 1923.
- The Widow's House, Dutton (New York, NY), 1924.
- It Is Better to Tell, J. Cape (London), 1927.
- Shula Agra (title means "Youth in the Saddle"), Dutton (New York City), 1927.
- Liv, introduction by Rebecca West, Dutton (New York, NY), 1929.
- A Flock of Birds, Dutton (New York, NY), 1930.
- The French Husband, Dutton (New York, NY), 1932.
- The Skeleton, Dutton (New York, NY), 1933.
- Morning Comes Early, Dutton (New York, NY), 1934.
- Undue Fulfillment, Morrow (New York, NY), 1934.
- Immortal Ease, Dutton (New York, NY), 1939.
- Who Dwell with Wonder, Dutton (New York, NY), 1940.
- To Hold against Famine, Dutton (New York, NY), 1942.

=== Other Works ===
- The Magical Realm (memoir), Dutton (New York, NY), 1943, with a biographical note by Siobhan Campbell, Wolfhound Press (Dublin), 1997.
- Josephine, (nonfiction), illustrated by Peggy Bacon, Harper (New York, NY), 1942.
- Major, and the Others (short stories), Dutton (New York, NY), 1942.
- Brittany Summer (juvenile), illustrated by Richard Floethe, Harper (New York, NY), 1940.

== Later life ==
Despite producing a large amount of writing, Coyle often struggled with money. In total, she published 19 novels and two autobiographies. She left Europe to move to the United States in 1937, with financial help from American friends. Coyle lived in New Hampshire with her daughter Michele, an artist, where she joined an artists' group the MacDowell Colony. During World War II Coyle wrote short stories for women's magazines. Coyle later moved to Princeton, where she was involved in research on Joan of Arc and St. Paul, and also reviewed books for the press. In 1951, she moved to Philadelphia, and she died there on 25 March 1952. Coyle's work has enjoyed new interest in the late 20th century.
