= List of compositions by Sergei Bortkiewicz =

This is a list of compositions by Sergei Bortkiewicz.

== Piano ==
=== Piano Solo ===
- 4 Pieces, Op. 3
  1. Capriccio
  2. Etude
  3. Gavotte-Caprice
  4. "Primula Veris"
- Impressions, 7 pieces, Op. 4
  1. Vieux Portrait (Old Picture)
  2. Etude d'oiseaux (Bird's Study)
  3. Tempete (Storm)
  4. Apres la Pluie (After the Rain)
  5. Bergers et Bergères (Shepherds and Shepherdesses)
  6. Au Clair de la Lune (By Moonlight)
  7. Bal masqué (Fancy Dress Ball)
- Minuit, 2 pieces, Op. 5
- Trois Morceaux, Op. 6
  1. Prelude
  2. Valse Triste
  3. Etude
- 2 Pieces, Op. 7
  1. Mélodie
  2. Menuet-fantasie
- Esquisses de Crimée, 4 pieces, Op. 8
  1. Les Rochers d'Outche-Coche
  2. Caprices de la Mer
  3. Idylle Orientale
  4. Chaos
- Piano Sonata No. 1 in B major, Op. 9
- Vier Klavierstücke, Op. 10
- Six pensées lyriques, Op. 11
- Trois Morceaux, Op. 12
- 6 Preludes, Op. 13
- Aus meiner Kindheit (From My Childhood), 6 pieces, Op. 14
  1. Was die Amme sang (What the Nurse Sang)
  2. Das dunkle Zimmer (The Dark Room)
  3. Die Tanzstunde (The Dancing Lesson)
  4. Erste Liebe (First Love)
  5. Erster Schmerz (First Sorrow)
  6. Wenn ich erst groß bin (When I am a Man)
- 10 Etudes, Op. 15
- Lamentations and Consolations, 8 pieces, Op. 17
- Der Kleine Wanderer (The Little Wanderer), 13 pieces, Op. 21
  1. Der Kleine Wanderer (The Little Wanderer)
  2. Im Schlitten (The Sleigh Drive)
  3. Das Lebewohl (The Farewell)
  4. Abfahrt des Zuges (The Train's Departure)
  5. Durch die Steppe (Through the Steps)
  6. In Polen (In Poland)
  7. Venedig, Gondellied (Venice, Song of the Gondelier)
  8. Neapel, Volkslied (Naples, Canzone)
  9. Frankreich, Volkslied (France, Folksong)
  10. Spanien, Serenade (Spain)
  11. England, Schottischer Tanz (England, Scottish Dance)
  12. Alt-Deutschland (Old Germany)
  13. Norwegen (Norway)
- 3 Pieces, Op. 24
  1. Nocturne (Diana)
  2. Valse Grotesque (Satyre)
  3. Impromptu (Eros)
- 3 Waltzes, Op. 27
  1. La Gracieuse
  2. La Melancolique
  3. La Viennoise
- 12 Etudes Nouvelles, Op. 29
  1. La blonde (G major)
  2. La rousse (E major)
  3. La brune (C♯ minor)
  4. Le philosophe (C♯ minor)
  5. Le poète, pour la main gauche seule (F♯ major)
  6. Le héros (E♭ major)
  7. Le mystérieux inconnu (G minor)
  8. Le jongleur (D major)
  9. Celui qui aime au clair de la lune. Etude du tremolo (E major)
  10. Don Quichotte (C major)
  11. Hamlet (E♭ minor)
  12. Falstaff (D major)
- Aus Andersens Märchen (From Andersen's Fairy Tales), 12 pieces, Op. 30
  1. The Princess and the Pea
  2. The Bell
  3. The Hardy Tin Soldier
  4. The Angel
  5. Little Ida's Flowers
  6. The Nightingale
  7. It is quite certain
  8. The Child in the Grave
  9. The Butterfly
  10. The Ugly Duckling
  11. Golden Treasure
  12. The Metal Pig
- 10 Preludes, Op. 33
- Ein Roman, 8 pieces, Op. 35
  1. Begegnung (Meeting)
  2. Plauderei (Conversation)
  3. Erwachende Liebe (Dawning Love)
  4. Auf dem Ball (In the Ballroom)
  5. Enttäuschung (Depression)
  6. Vorwürfe (Reproaches)
  7. Ein Brief (A Letter)
  8. Höchstes Glück (Supreme Happiness)
- Kindheit: 14 leichte Stücke nach dem Roman von Leo Tolstoj (Childhood: 14 Light Pieces after the novel of Leo Tolstoy), Op. 39
  1. Der Lehrer (The Teacher)
  2. Maman (Mama)
  3. Der Vater (The Father)
  4. Grischa, der wandernde Mönch (Grischa, the Wandering Monk)
  5. Katienka & Liubotschka, Polka
  6. Kindheit (Childhood)
  7. Die Amme (The Nurse)
  8. Die Jagd (The Hunt)
  9. Robinson-Spiele (Playing at Robinson Crusoe)
  10. Vielleicht erste Liebe (Perhaps First Love)
  11. Die Gäste kommen (The Guests Arrive)
  12. Quadrille
  13. Mazurka
  14. Der Tod der Mutter (The Mother's Death)
- 7 Preludes, Op. 40
- Ballade, Op. 42
- Élégie, Op. 46
- Im 3/4 Takt: Sechs Klavierstücke, Op. 48
- Marionettes, 9 pieces, Op. 54
  1. Russisches Bauernmädchen (Russian Peasant Girl)
  2. Der Kosak (The Cossack)
  3. Spanierin (The Spanish Lady)
  4. Tirolerin (The Tirolese)
  5. Zigeuner (The Gipsy)
  6. Marquise (The Marchioness)
  7. Der Chinese (The Chinese)
  8. Teddybär (Teddy Bear)
  9. Kasperl-Harlekin (Punch-Harlequin)
- Jugoslavische Suite, Op. 58
- Lyrica Nova, 4 pieces, Op. 59
- Piano Sonata No. 2 in C♯ minor, Op. 60
- Fantasiestücke, Op. 61
  1. Warum?
  2. Ein Traum
  3. ... und das Erwachen
  4. Humoreske
  5. Sie tanzt
  6. Serenade
- 3 Mazurkas, Op. 64
- 4 Klavierstücke, Op. 65
  1. Chant sans paroles (Lied ohne Worte; Song Without Words) (E major)
  2. Etude (E minor)
  3. Epithalame (Chant nuptile), for the left hand (Hochzeitsang; Wedding Song) (C♯ major)
  4. Capriccio alla Pollaca (C♯ minor)
- Preludes, Op. 66

=== Piano 4-Hands ===
- Russische Weisen und Tänze,(Russian Dance) Op. 31

=== Two Pianos ===
- Russische Tänze, Op. 18

== Chamber music ==
=== Violin and Piano ===
- Violin Sonata in G minor, Op. 26
- Suite for Violin and Piano, Op. 63
- Berceuse for Violin and Piano

=== Cello and Piano ===
- Three Pieces for Cello and Piano, Op. 25
- Cello Sonata, Op. 36

=== Piano Trio ===
- Piano Trio, Op. 38

== Orchestral ==
=== Symphonies ===
- Symphony No. 1 in D major “From my Homeland”, Op. 52
- Symphony No. 2 in E♭ major, Op. 55

=== Symphonic Poems ===
- Othello, Op. 19

=== Concertos ===
- Piano Concerto No. 1, Op. 16 (Kistner & Siegel 1913) (Dedicated to Elisabeth Bortkiewicz)
- Cello Concerto, Op. 20 (Rahter 1922)
- Violin Concerto, Op. 22 (Rahter 1923)
- Piano Concerto No. 2 for the left hand only, Op. 28 (Manuscript Rahter 1924)
- Piano Concerto No. 3, Op. 32 'Per aspera ad astra' (Rahter 1927) (Dedicated to Paul de Conne)
- Des Frühlings und des Pans Erwachen - ein lyrisches intermezzo nach Gemälden von Sandro Botticelli for violin and orchestra, Op. 44 (manuscript 1934)
- Russian Rhapsody for piano and orchestra, Op. 45 (manuscript 1935)

=== Other ===
- Russische Tänze for Orchestra, Op. 18
- Träume, Fantasy for Orchestra, Op. 34
- Österreichische Suite for String Orchestra, Op. 51
- Overture for Orchestra, Op. 53
- Jugoslawische Suite for Orchestra, Op. 58

== Opera ==
- Die Akrobaten, Op. 50

== Ballet ==
- Arabische Nächte, Op. 37

== Lieder ==
- Sechs Lieder, Op. 2
- Sieben Gedichte von Paul Verlaine, Op. 23
- Hafis Lieder, Op. 43
- Russische Gedichte, Op. 47
- Im Park, Op. 56
- Sternflug des Herzens, Op. 62
- Vier Lieder, Op. 67
- Drei Lieder, Op. 69
- Drei Melodramen, Op. 71
- Lieder, Op. 72
- Lieder, Op. 73
- Lieder, Op. 74
