= The Empire of the Steppes =

1939 book by René Grousset

The Empire of the Steppes: A History of Central Asia
- Book cover
- Author: René Grousset
- Translator: Naomi Walford
- Language: English
- Subject: History of Central Asia
- Genre: Non-fiction, History
- Publisher: Rutgers University Press
- Publication date: 1939
- Publication place: United States
- English publication date: 1970
- Media type: Hardcover, Paperback
- Pages: 687
- ISBN: 978-0-8135-0627-2
- Website: Book website at RUP

The Empire of the Steppes: A History of Central Asia (French: L'Empire des steppes, Attila, Gengis-Khan, Tamerlan) is a 1939 book written by French historian René Grousset covering the history of Central Asia from ancient times through 1757. The book covers a long arc of history, from the nomadic travels of the ancient Scythians to the final empires of the Mongols in the 18th century. The work was translated into English in 1952 by Naomi Walford and republished in 1970 by Rutgers University Press. (Note: Reprint of 1939 French Edition: 1970, Rutgers University Press, 687pp. ISBN 978-0-8135-1304-1. Paperback edition followed in 1970 also from Rutgers University Press.) Designed for both the lay reader searching for an introduction to the subject, as well as historians of the subject, the book covers a sweep of history covering ten centuries and centers around the careers of three major historical figures in Central Asian history, Attila the Hun, Genghis Khan, and Timur.

== Academic journal reviews ==
- Huddle, Frank Jr. (1971). "René Grousset. The Empire of the Steppes: A History of Central Asia. Translated from the French by Naomi Walford. New Brunswick: Rutgers University Press. 1970". The American Historical Review. 76 (4): 1204–1205. doi:10.1086/ahr/76.4.1204.
- Grousset, Rene; Walford, Naomi; Luther, Kenneth Allin (1976). "Review of The Empire of the Steppes: A History of Central Asia". Journal of the American Oriental Society. 96 (2): 295–296. doi:10.2307/599841. JSTOR 599841.
- Sinor, Denis; Grousset, Rene (1971). "Review of The Empire of the Steppes: A History of Central Asia". The Journal of Asian Studies. 30 (3): 633–638. doi:10.1017/S0021911800154919. JSTOR 2052468.
- Grousset, René; Huddle, Frank (1971). "Review of The Empire of the Steppes: A History of Central Asia, René Grousset". The American Historical Review. 76 (4): 1204–1205. doi:10.2307/1849340. JSTOR 1849340.
- Grousset, René; Walford, Naomi; Penrose, G. Larry (1972). "Review of The Empire of the Steppes. A History of Central Asia, René Grousset". Journal of Asian History. 6 (2): 187–188. JSTOR 41930062.
- Pierce, Richard A.; Grousset, Rene; Walford, Naomi; Hambly, Gavin (1971). "Review of The Empire of the Steppes: A History of Central Asia". Pacific Affairs. 44 (2): 276–277. doi:10.2307/2755398. JSTOR 2755398.

== See also ==
- Eurasian Steppe
- History of Central Asia
