= Pip (novel) =

1907 novel by Ian Hay

- Author: Ian Hay
- Language: English
- Publication date: 1907
- Publication place: United Kingdom
- Media type: Print
- Text: Pip at Wikisource

Pip is a 1907 novel by the British writer Ian Hay. His debut work, its title hero is a schoolboy.

== Bibliography ==
- George Watson & Ian R. Willison. The New Cambridge Bibliography of English Literature, Volume 4. CUP, 1972.
- Richard Usborne. Wodehouse at work to the end. Barrie and Jenkins, 1976.
