= Nathalie Krebs =

Danish potter (1895–1978)

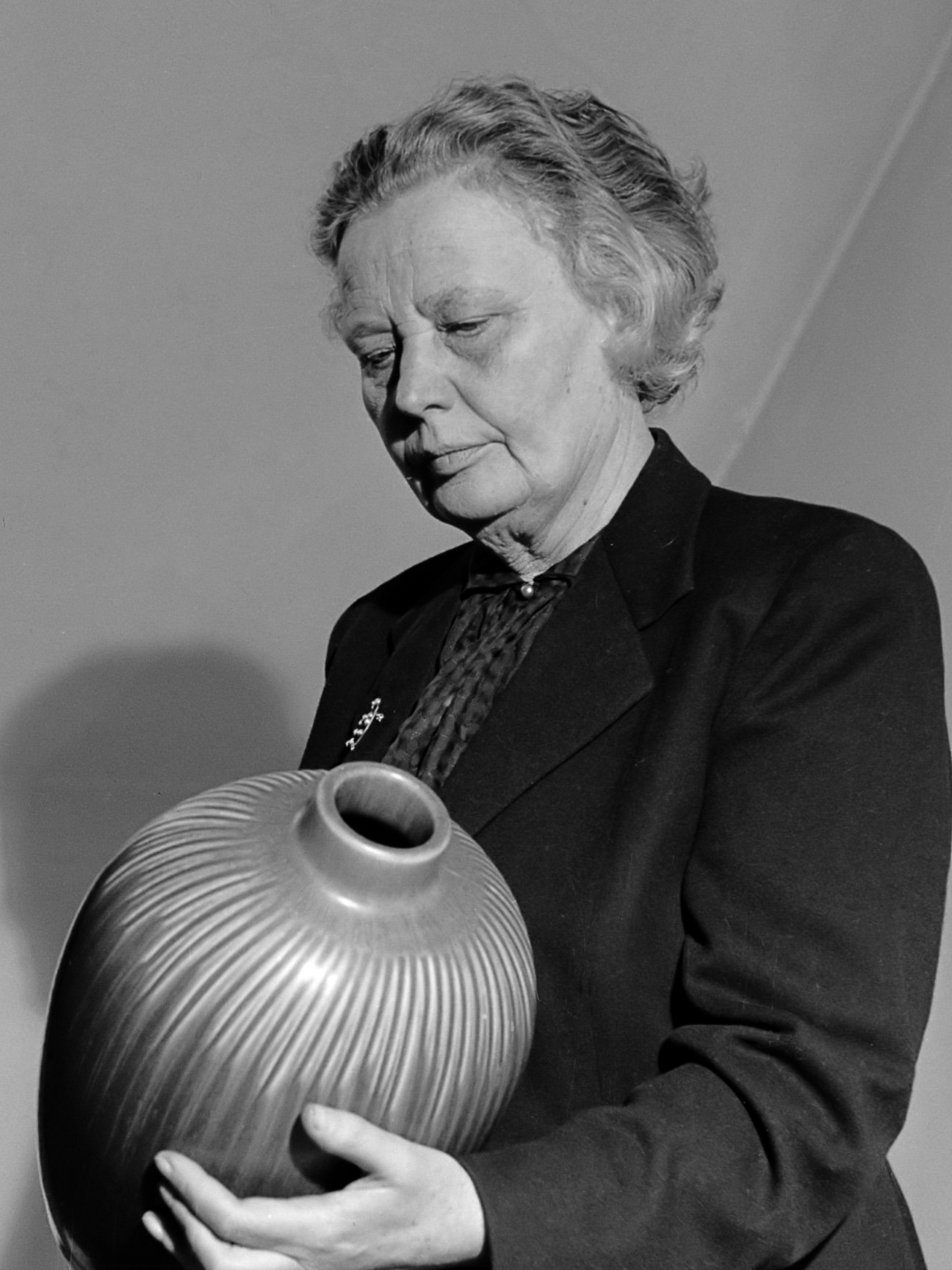
Nathalie Krebs (1954)

Johanne Nathalie Krebs (August 5, 1895 in Aarhus – January 5, 1978 in Copenhagen) was a Danish potter. She was the sister of the medical doctor and explorer Carl Krebs.

Krebs was employed at the Bing & Grøndahl between 1919 and 1929, where she worked with ceramist Gunnar Nylund. In 1929 she and Nylynd founded the company Nylund & Krebs, who rented the potter Patrick Nordström's workshop in Islev, Copenhagen. The company exhibited at Bo in Copenhagen and Svenskt Tenn in Stockholm in the autumn of 1930, as well as in Helsinki. When Nylund was hired as artistic director at Rörstrand in 1931, Krebs founded Saxbo stentøj in Gladsaxe, where she produced serial stoneware. She experimented with copper and iron glaze on simple stoneware shapes and reached results that gave her international reputation. From 1932 ceramist Eva Stæhr-Nielsen was tied to the workshop as a designer, and Krebs also collaborated with Edith Sonne Bruun. Saxbo was shut down in 1968.

In 1937 she was awarded the Tagea Brandt Rejselegat award, and in 1951 the Prince Eugen Medal.

== Sources ==
- "Nathalie Krebs" . Store Norske Leksikon . Read January 5, 2011 .
- "Nathalie Krebs' . Den Store Danske . Read January 5, 2011 .
