= Dilba =

Swedish singer (born 1971)

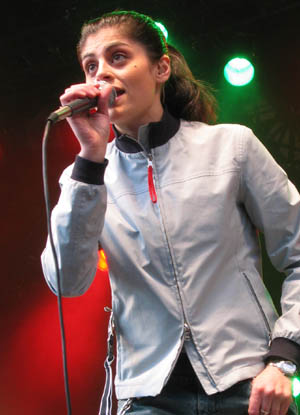
- Dilba performing at Liseberg, Gothenburg.

Background information
- Also known as: Dilba
- Born: Dilbahar Demirbağ; 24 November 1971 (age 54); Elazığ, Turkey
- Genres: R&B, pop, dance
- Occupation: Singer-songwriter
- Instruments: Piano, guitar, vocals
- Years active: 1996 – present
- Label: Warner Bros. Records

Dilbahar Demirbağ (born 24 November 1971), known as Dilba, is a Swedish pop singer of Kurdish background. Her first album Dilba (1996) reached commercial success.

== Early life ==
Dilba was born in Kirvan, a village in eastern Turkey, and her family is ethnic Kurd. She immigrated to Sweden when she was only four years old, where she grew up in Karlstad and Uppsala. She has four siblings: Dilşa, Dilnarin, Dilber and Assan.

Dilba was introduced to the piano as early as when she went to kindergarten and is also self-taught in the guitar. She started her career as a DJ and she has also worked as a backup singer for the Swedish pop singers Jennifer Brown and Eric Gadd.

== Recording career ==
In 1996, Dilba released her debut album Dilba together with the single I'm Sorry. She wrote all the songs by herself. The album was a success, and she was awarded with a Grammy and the Aftonbladet prize Rockbjörnen. The album sold more than 100,000 copies in Sweden.

After a successful summer tour in 1997, it took two years until she released her second album You & I in 1999. It was rewarded with a "five plus" accolade by Aftonbladet and overall acclaim by critics; the disc sold over 20,000 copies in Sweden, reaching gold certification.

Dilba's third album Revolution was released in March 2003, along with the single Every Little Thing, which was a success on the radio. In 2005, Dilba composed the song Miracle, which became the theme score for the Swedish television's TV-series Kommissionen. Also, during the autumn of 2005, Dilba had regular live performances at a club in Stockholm.

Dilba participated in Melodifestivalen 2011, the Swedish selection for the Eurovision Song Contest 2011. She competed in the first semi-final on 5 February 2011 at Coop Norrbotten Arena, Luleå with the song "Try Again" (Pettersson/Sonnvik) but she did not qualify for the next round. The song however became an instant hit, went straight to iTunes number one and Digilistan's second place. An EP of "Try Again" also followed.

== Personal life ==
In 1998, Dilba met pop singer Martin Svensson at a party, and they later married in the summer of 2000. A divorce was filed in 2002.

In July 2007, Dilba was detained from boarding a plane to the United States after joking that she had some planes to bomb.

Dilba also starred in Let's Dance 2008, but was voted off the show.

Her sisters are dancer Dilnarin Demirbag and journalist Dilsa Demirbag-Sten.

== Discography ==
- Dilba (1996)
- You & I (1999)
- Live at Lydmar (2002)
- Revolution (2003)
