= Dee Demirbag =

Swedish dancer & singer (born 1973)

- Born: Dilnarin Demirbag; 14 November 1973 (age 52)
- Origin: Kirvan, Elazığ Turkey
- Genres: pop
- Occupations: Dancer, singer
- Years active: 1995–present

Dilnarin "Dee" Demirbag (born 14 November 1973 in Kirvan Elazığ, Turkey) is a Swedish dancer and singer, of Kurdish background.

== Early life ==
Demirbag was born in Kirvan, a small village in eastern Turkey. She came to Sweden with her family in 1976 and grew up in the cities of Karlstad and Uppsala. In the 1990s she started her career as a dancer, singer and photo model.

== Career ==
She appeared in the Swedish TV series NileCity 105.6 in 1995 and was dancing in Staffan Ling's Swedish TV program Stadskampen in 1998.

Dee figured in E-Type's band and on stage.

In 2000 Dee signed up with Stockholm Records for a solo project and made her debut single '"All the Way Up"' followed by the single '"Want You to Go".

In 2001 she left E-Type, but since 2005 she has been touring with the band on most concerts and still does so.

== Personal life ==
She lives in Stockholm, Sweden. She is sister of Dilba and Dilsa Demirbag Sten.
