= Gerda Wallander =

Swedish painter (1860–1926)

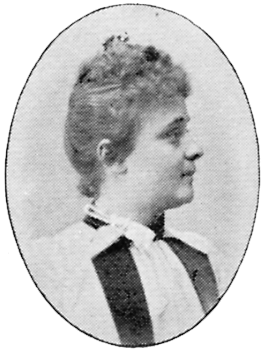
Gerda Charlotta Wallander

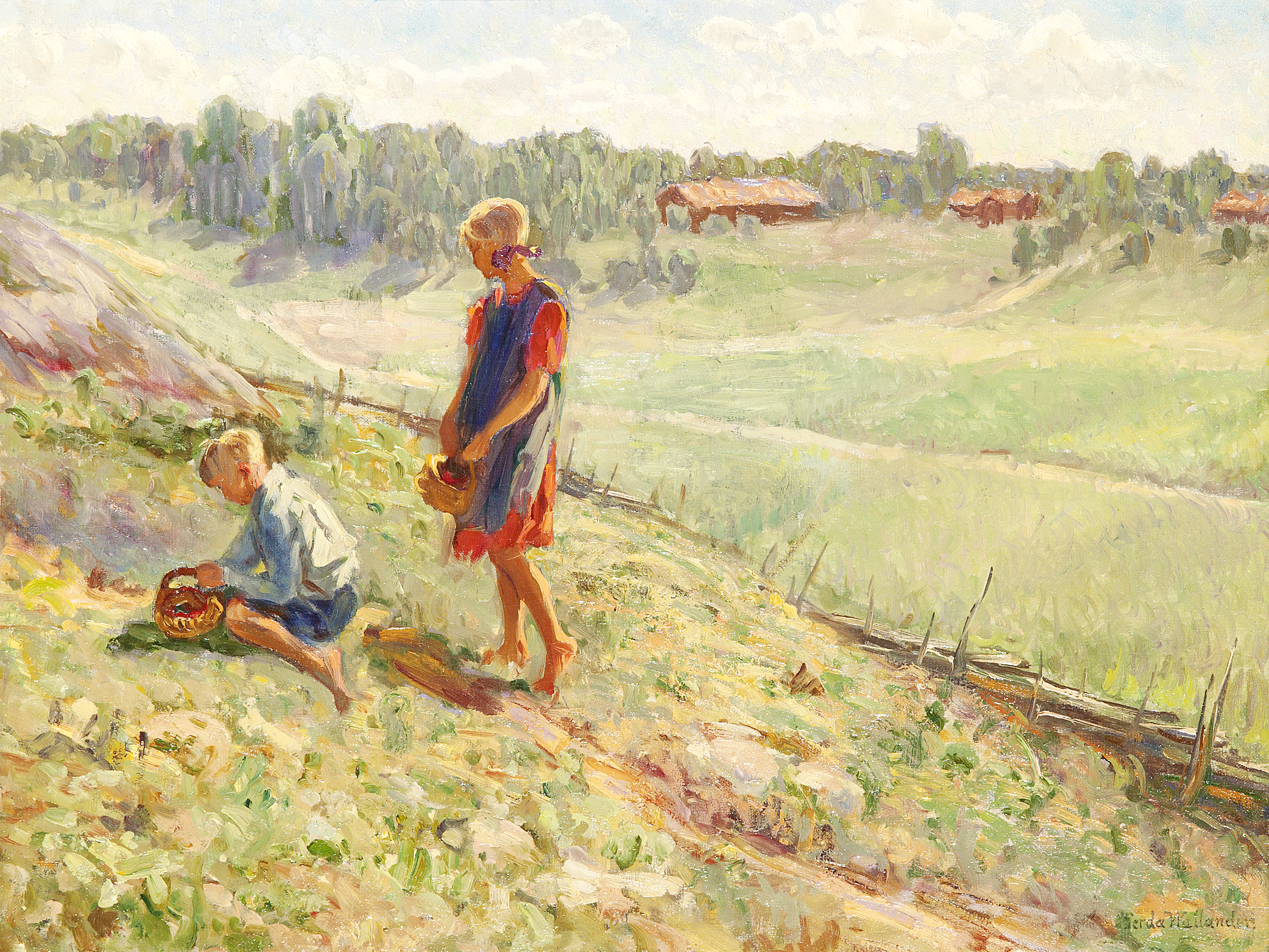
Berry Picking Children a Summer Day by Gerda Wallander

Gerda Charlotta Wallander (17 August 1860 – 14 January 1926) was a Swedish portrait and genre painter.

== Biography ==
Wallander was born in Stockholm, Sweden. She was the daughter of Carl Emanuel Wallander and Fanny Albertina Hübner. She was the niece of artist and art professor Josef Wilhelm Wallander.

She studied at the Royal Swedish Academy of Fine Arts during the period of 1879 to 1884, and then in Paris. She had several exhibitions of her landscape paintings. Her work, which included city motifs and landscapes, is held in the collections of Norrköping, Linköping, Jönköping and Kristianstad museums.

In 1886, she married her cousin, the artist and designer Alf Wallander. Their son, Sven Wallander, was an architect.

After 1905, she lived at Villa Gärdsgården at Stocksund in Danderyd municipality. She died in Stockholm in 1926. The family is buried in the Solna Church cemetery.
