= Proventus =

Swedish investment company

- Type: Private
- Industry: Investment company
- Founded: 1980; 46 years ago
- Founder: Robert Weil
- Headquarters: Stockholm, Sweden
- Area served: Sweden
- Key people: Robert Weil (chairman); Daniel Sachs (CEO)
- Products: Investments
- Website: www.proventus.se

Proventus is a privately held Swedish investment company founded in 1980 by Robert Weil. It was listed on the Stockholm Stock Exchange from 1982 until 1995.

Proventus currently holds shares in companies such as BRIO AB, o2 Produktion AB, J. Lindeberg AB, Nordic Broadcasting Oy, Artek Oy and Tom Dixon. It has previously held shares in companies such as Aritmos, Götabanken, MTV3, Orrefors Kosta Boda, Puma, TV4 and Upsala-Ekeby.

Apart from the investment operations, Proventus is also engaged in the arts through the cultural institutions Magasin 3 Stockholm Konsthall and the Jewish Theatre in Stockholm.

== See also ==
- Funnel.io
- Rebtel
