= Anna-Lisa Thomson =

Swedish painter and ceramist (1905–1952)

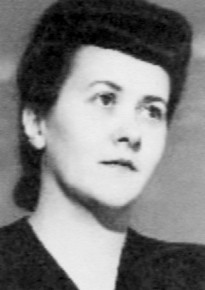
- Born: 20 September 1905; Karlskrona Sweden
- Died: 12 February 1952 (aged 46)
- Education: Technical School in Stockholm
- Known for: Ceramic art, Illustration

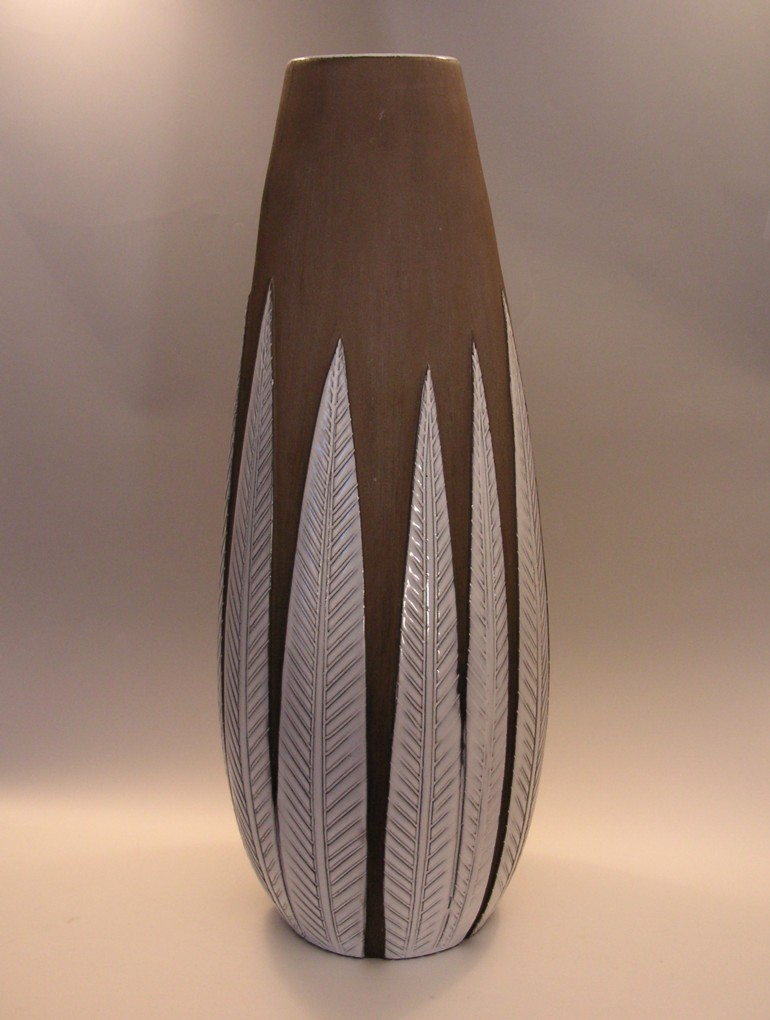
Anna-Lisa Thomsons "Paprika", 1948

Anna-Lisa Thomson, born 20 September 1905 in Karlskrona, Sweden, died 12 February 1952, was a Swedish painter and ceramist .

== Biography ==
Anna-Lisa Thomson received her education at the Technical School in Stockholm from 1924 to 1928. She began immediately after training at the ceramic factory St. Erik lervarufabrik in Uppsala. After two years, she was the factory's artistic director. In the mid 1930s she came to Upsala-Ekeby AB where she and Sven Erik Skawonius and Vicke Lindstrand would change the company's ceramic direction. Thomson's and Skawonius' ornamental goods and crockery received several international awards, including in Paris in 1937 and New York in 1939.

One of Thomson's most famous works is the vase "Paprika" of 1948, which was manufactured in a variety of shapes and sizes and produced still well into the 1960s. "Paprika" is a combination of rough, black pottery and shiny white or yellow glaze, this was a novelty for the time. "Lancett" (1949) was another innovative work, an urn with a relief. Her art goods were distinguished by their simple clean shapes with painted or embossed plant and marine motifs. Purposefully, she introduced the principle that through cooperation with big industry to create inexpensive objects, good design would thereby become available to the general public.

Anna-Lisa Thomson was also a talented painter, and she spent part of the year painting in her summer cottage in Grundsund on the west coast. Her work was naive, nature-inspired and colourful. She suffered from cancer and died at 46 years of age. The Swedish book of poetry "Eko av dagens ljusa klang" includes Anna-Lisa Thomson illustrations and was published posthumously in 1953.

A foundation in memory of Anna-Lisa Thomson was established after her death in 1952. The foundation's main task is to award annual scholarships to female artists and their education.
