= Robert Weil (businessman) =

Swedish businessman and philanthropist

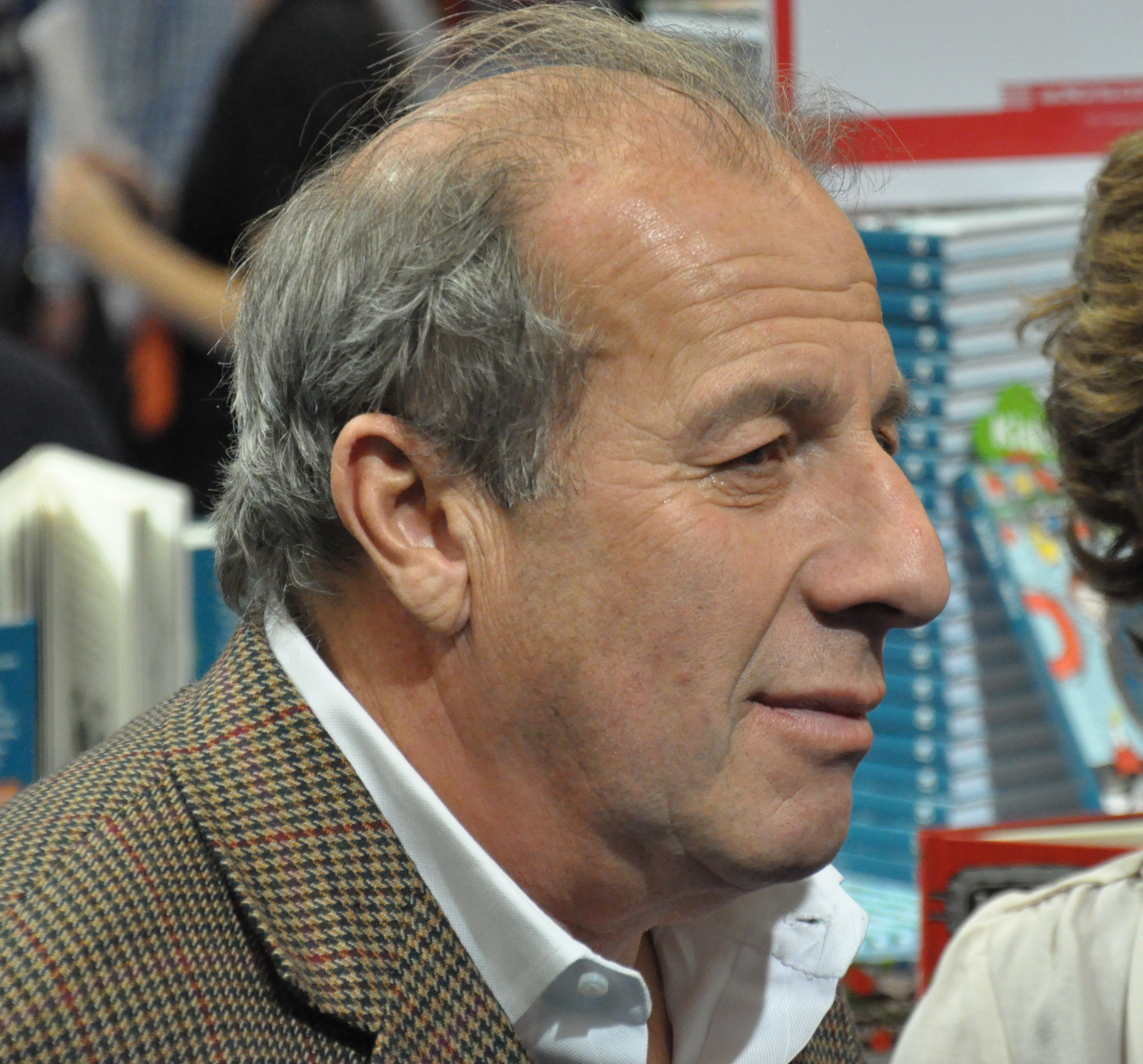
- Robert Weil (2011)
- Born: Robert Sam Weil; 21 November 1948 (age 77); Bromma, Stockholm, Sweden
- Occupations: Businessman, philanthropist

Robert Sam Weil (born 21 November 1948 in Bromma, Stockholm Municipality) is a Swedish businessman.

== Background ==
Robert Weil's grandfather, Jewish by birth, was the CEO of Deutsche Bank in Munich, and board member at several large German companies until 1933 when the bank was Aryanised and he had to leave Europe for USA. Weil's grandparents stayed in Europe and were murdered during the Holocaust because they were Jews. Robert Weil's parents left Germany when Hitler came to power. After a period of time in Denmark, they came to Sweden in 1938. In Stockholm, Weil's parents established a company in Södertälje that produced curtains. Inspired by his grandfather, Weil at a young age began analysing Swedish companies on the stock exchange, studied economics at upper secondary school, and founded the investment company Weil Invest in 1969. In 1980 Weil Invest merged with the newly founded company Proventus, and has since then operated under the name Proventus. The company was listed on the Stockholm Stock Exchange between 1982-95, after which it was bought out by Weil.

Proventus AB is a family-owned investment company, focusing on long-term asset management based on Proventus' own independent analyses. Several prominent employees have to different extents, and at various positions, been involved in shaping Proventus' activities, such as; Gabriel Urwitz (CEO Proventus AB), Ulf Ericsson (CEO at Proventus owned Upsala Ekeby), Ulrica Hydman Vallien and Bertil Vallien (designers at Kosta Boda, owned by Proventus) Sven Erik Ragnar (CEO of the Proventus owned Gotagruppen) Mikael Kamras (Vice CEO Proventus, later CEO Proventus), Sheila Hicks (Chairperson of Proventus owned Kinnasand), Thore Ohlsson (CEO of Proventus owned Aritmos and chairperson at PUMA), Mirkku Kullberg (CEO Artek) Tom Dixon (Artistic director Artek) Jochen Zeits (CEO Proventus owned PUMA), Werner Hofmann (later owner and CEO Kinnasand), Daniel Sachs (CEO Proventus AB). Other important people that have contributed to the development of Proventus; Inez Svensson (designer and former principle at Konstfack University of Arts, Crafts and Design), Barbro Werthén Kylin (Sweden's first female accountant). and Anders Wester (art director). Proventus has taken responsibility for restructurings such as Upsala Ekeby with companies like Kosta Boda; Aritmos with a large number of international brands such as Puma; And Art and Technology with the companies Kinnasand, Artek and Snowcrash In addition to these, Proventus was also instrumental in several high-profile restructurings in the finance world, such as Götabanken in the 1980s, later GotaGruppen.

Robert Weil's commitment to the arts and culture is evident in the founding of art hall Magasin III (1987) in Frihamnen, Stockholm, together with David Neuman. Over the years Magasin III built one of Europes most important contemporary art collections, and in 2014 developed into Magasin III Museum for Contemporary Art. In 2018 this Swedish museum opened up a branch in Israel, Magasin III Jaffa, with its own book store for art books, Magasin III Jaffa Books. David Neuman was a part of founding the Curating Arts course at Stockholm University in 2002. This close collaboration developed into a mutual effort between Stockholm University, Magasin III and The Robert Weil Family Foundation to open Accelerator (2018) – a space for art and science on campus – with curator Richard Julin as its artistic director. Between the years 1995-2015, Robert Weil together with the artistic director Pia Forsgren, The Jewish Theatre at Djurgården in Stockholm.

Robert Weil has through Proventus, and later The Robert Weil Family Foundation (2014), supported och contributed to make the Israeli Batsheva Dance Company into a world leading institution; collaborated with Konstfack University of Arts, Crafts and Design; Beckmans College of Design; and Dramaten - the Royal Dramatic Theatre. Weil supported the founding of the Jewish Museum in Stockholm in 1987, and also served on its first board. Since 2019, the Robert Weil Family Foundation has been a long-term partner of the museum. Support is also given to initiatives such as SKMA (The Swedish committee against antisemitism). and Expo. In 2002 the Israeli environmental organisation EcoOcean was founded by Andreas Weil with support from the family Weil and since 2010 the rabbi Michael Melchior in Jerusalem constitutes an important collaborator. The foundation also manages several scholarships.

Robert Weil is engaged in issues of democracy and has shared his views in the daily press through articles, that often depart from a critical perspective on the influence and responsibility of capitalism. This commitment is also evident in the creation of The Per Ahlmark Foundation (2009) and Berättarministeriet (Ministry of Storytelling, founded in 2011 together with Dilsa Demirbag-Sten and Sven Hagströmer) as well as several other foundations. Between February-September in 1999, Weil wrote a chronicle for the daily paper Dagens Industri, with his thoughts and observations on society and economy, and he has been regularly published in the daily paper Dagens Nyheter.

== Awards ==
St Eriksmedaljen Stockholms stad, Stockholms universitet Stora medalj, Hans majestät konungens medalj
