= KTH Great Prize =

Annual award

KTH Great Prize Swedish: KTH:s stora pris
- Country: Sweden
- First award: Herman Nilsson-Ehle (1945)
- Currently held by: Johan von Schreeb (2024)

The KTH Great Prize (Swedish: KTH:s stora pris) is a prize awarded annually by the KTH Great Prize Foundation from the 1944 donation, which is administered by KTH Royal Institute of Technology. The foundation was established in 1944 to finance the prize. In 2025, the awarded sum amounts to SEK 1,900,000.

The Swedish geneticist Herman Nilsson-Ehle was the first recipient of the KTH Great Prize. In 2013, it was awarded to Robyn, and in 2024 to Johan von Schreeb.
