= Rörstrand =

Swedish porcelain manufacturer

- Type: Subsidiary
- Industry: Ceramic tableware and artware
- Founded: 1726; 300 years ago
- Parent: Fiskars
- Website: www.rorstrand.com

Rörstrand porcelain is one of the most famous Swedish porcelain manufacturers, with production initially at Karlbergskanalen in Birkastan in Stockholm.

== History ==
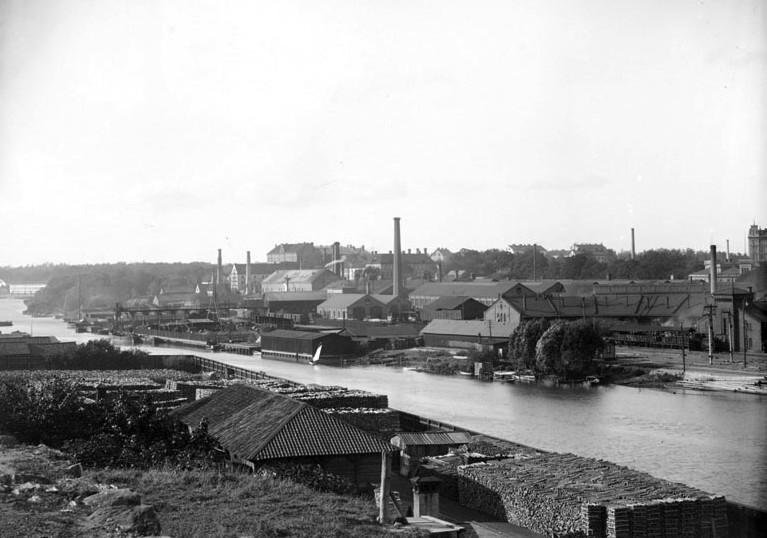
Rörstrand Factory 1896

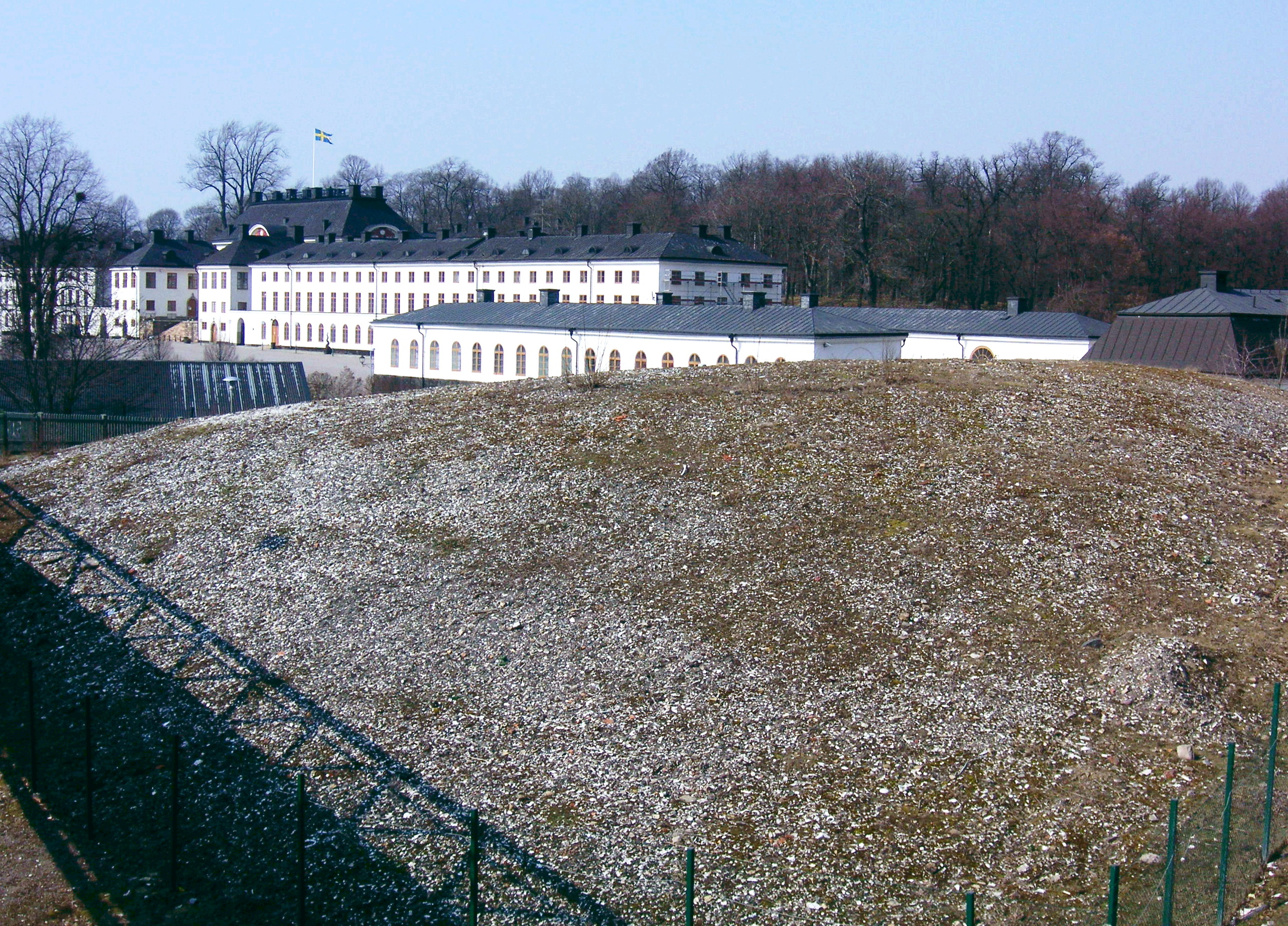
Porcelain tip in 2008 by Karlberg Castle in the background.

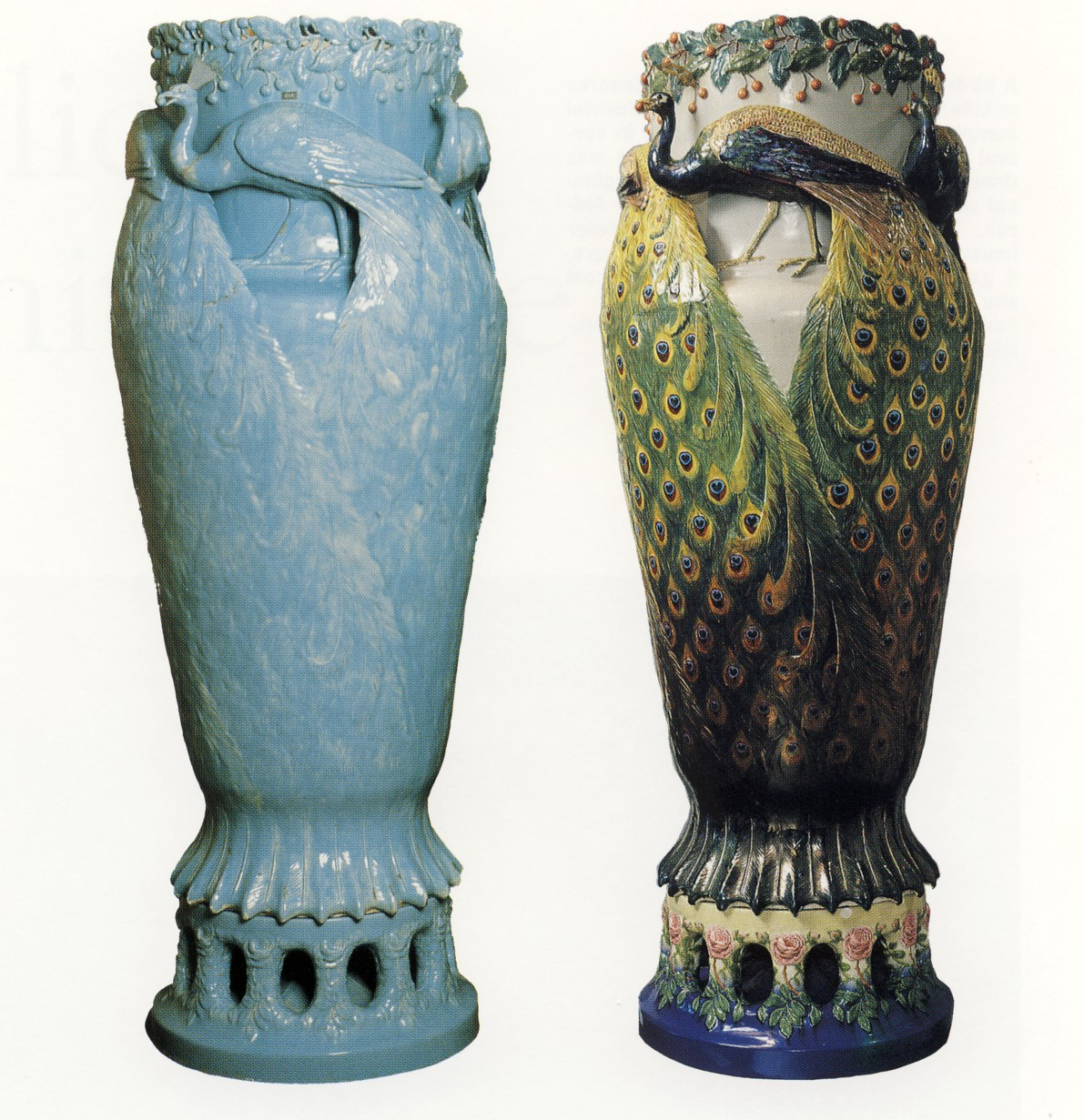
"Peacock Vase" by Anna Boberg, two variants 1897

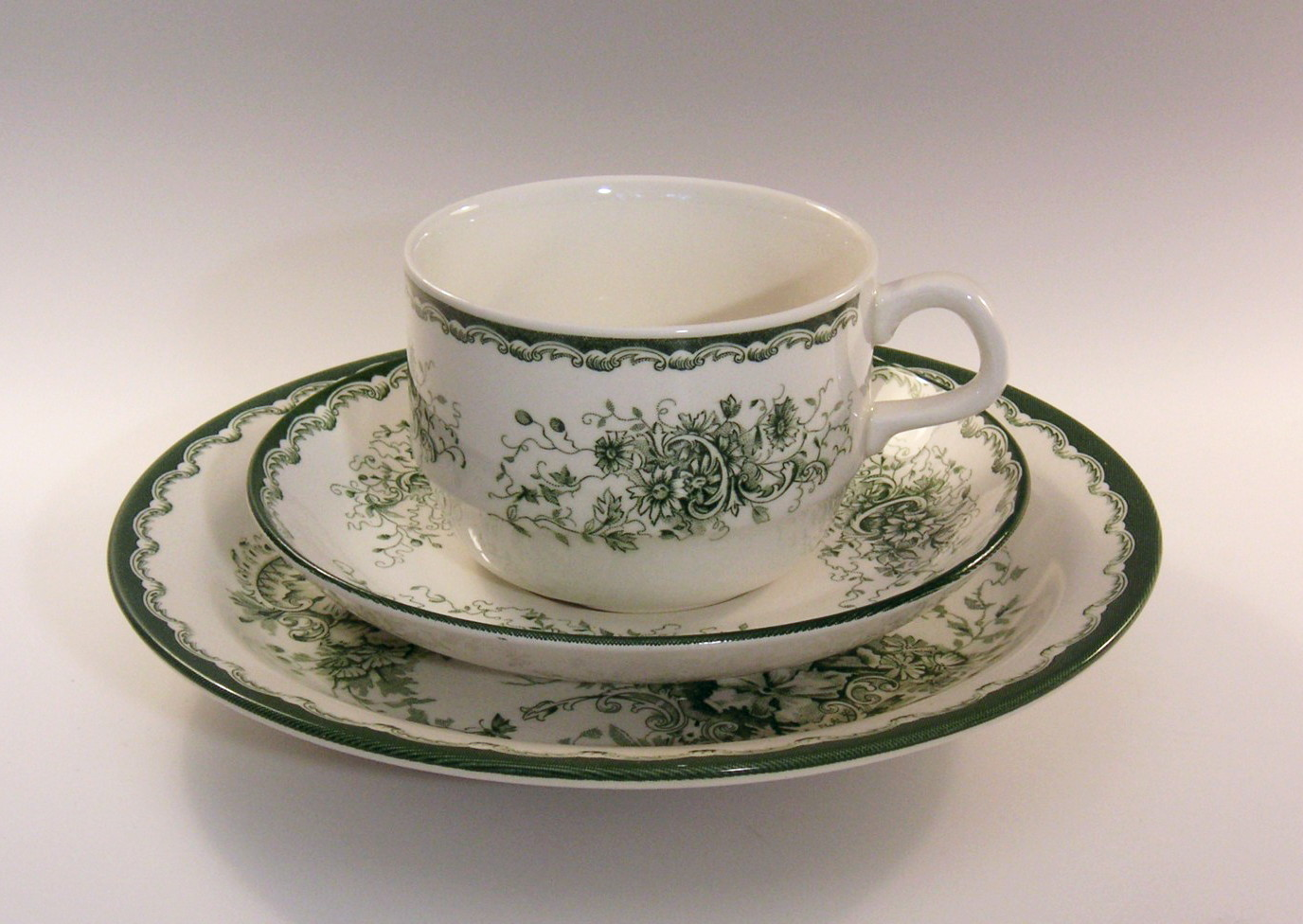
Transfer-printed teacup in the "Green Anna" pattern

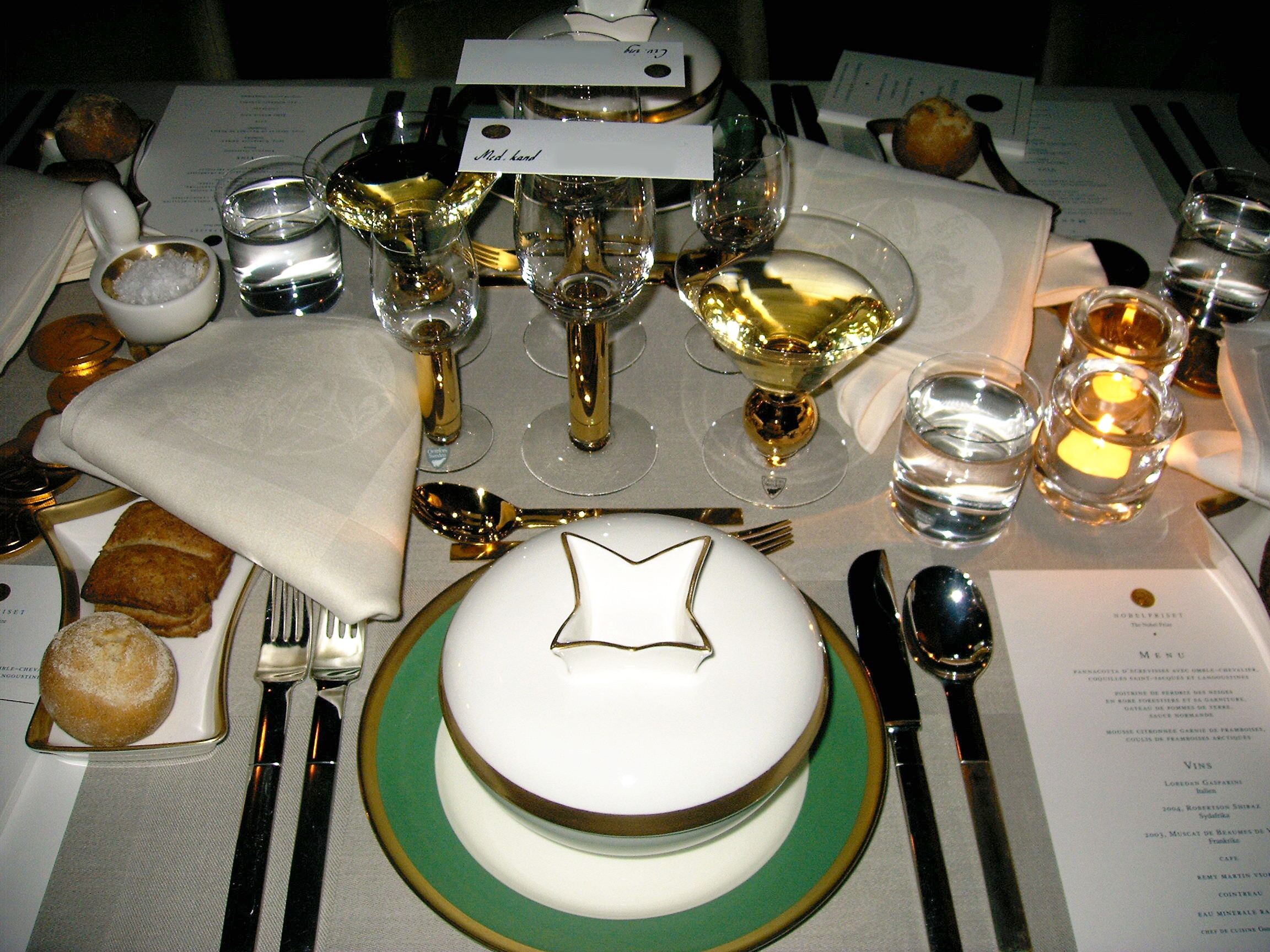
"Nobel tableware" in 2005

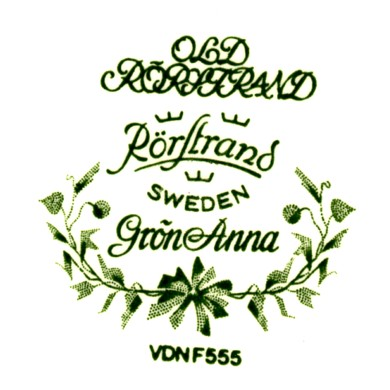

The Rörstrand waterfront site was first documented in the 13th century when Magnus Ladulås donated property to the Convent of Poor Clares. In 1527, the area was returned to the crown under Gustavus Vasa. The area was named "Rörstrand" because the clear lake's shore was overgrown with reeds.

After an "Associations contract between all concerned in the Swedish Porcelain works, which will be established at great Rörstrand in the Delft manner" was signed in 1726, a porcelain factory was built at the castle of Rörstrand. The factory had indeed been given the privilege to produce true porcelain, but faience was the only ware that was made until the 1770s. In 1758, the rival manufactory at Marieberg began to produce porcellanous stoneware. High production costs, a small market, and intense competition from imported Chinese porcelain kept Rörstrand from trying to copy Marieberg's goods.

By the 1770s, Rörstrand began producing its version of English stoneware, but it took a substantial amount of time until Rörstrand mastered the technology. After the acquisition of Marieberg in 1785, Rörstrand was the only major Swedish porcelain factory, and technology was not a priority. Only after Gustavsberg, founded in 1826, became a competitor, mass production of transfer-printed tableware (earthenware) took off. During the 1860s, the Rörstrand porcelain facility was one of the nation's largest factories.

In 1900, Rörstrand employed around 1,100 people. The factory's products had an excellent reputation worldwide, and it participated successfully in various art and industrial exhibitions.

The expansion of Stockholm required land for housing. In 1926, the factory in Rörstrand was closed and demolished. Production was then moved to Gothenburg (after the Gothenburg porcelain factory was acquired) and then to Lidköping in the 1930s.

Between 1960 and 1990, Rörstrand passed through several owners, including Upsala-Ekeby AB, Finnish Wärtsilä, Hakusan and Gustavsberg porcelain factory. As of 2001, Rörstrand is a part of Iittala, which moved production to Sri Lanka and Hungary. On 30 December 2005, the factory in Lidköping closed down. Thus, an important chapter of Swedish industrial history ended after almost 280 years. In 2007, Iittala, which owns the Rörstrand brand, was acquired by Fiskars.

The former porcelain factory is now a museum, in which the legacy lives on.

== Tableware ==
Complete dinnerware table sets in the same decor could be ordered from the beginning. These sets were usually custom-made, and no product names were assigned.

When printed decors for mass production appeared —the first dinnerware dates from 1826—they were not given product names. In the mid-1800s, a few descriptive names, such as "Turkish pattern," appeared in the price lists, but product names for tableware were introduced only at the end of the 1800s. The exception is the Willow pattern, already well-known and well-reputed in England; Rörstrand produced its decor version between 1830 and 1888.

The "Purple Lace" pattern was one of the most popular tableware patterns of the 1800s. It was produced from 1845 to 1934 and remained popular well into the 1900s. At the turn of the century, Rörstrand created a range of tableware sets, such as "Bella" and "Vineta," produced for nearly 50 years.

Another of Rörstrand's long-running dinnerware sets was "Green Anna" (Swedish: Gröna Anna or Grön Anna). The Gothenburg Porcelain Factory produced the design starting in 1926. Ostindia is an example of one of the factory's popular designs; it is still made today.

As for more recent productions, "Mon Amie" - the white porcelain tableware with cobalt blue nuanced flowers - was designed by Marianne Westman in 1952. Through the years, "Mon Amie" became a classic and was relaunched in 2008 as a celebration of Marianne Westman's 80th birthday.

In 1956, Rörstrand designer Hertha Bengtson developed "Koka Blå". In the 1960s, the "Koka" design was also launched in brown and green versions.

== Some important products ==
- Since the 1760s, leading manufacturers of stoves
- 1760s: first printed decors
- 1770s: first pieces of earthenware
- 1881: first dinner service of feldspar porcelain
- 1930: presentation of the National tableware, designed by Louise Adelborg, the Stockholm Exhibition of 1930
- 1991: presentation of the Nobel tableware, used since the Nobel Banquet

== Some Rörstrand designers and potters ==
- Louise Adelborg
- Henrik Allert
- Hertha Bengtson
- Anna Boberg
- Ferdinand Boberg
- Anna Carlgren
- Drejargruppen
- Ossian Elgström
- Einar Forseth
- Isaac Grünewald
- Edward Hald
- Hertha Hillfon
- Ulrica Hydman-Vallien
- Filippa Knutsson (Filippa K)
- Sylvia Leuchovius
- Gertrud Lönegren-Jerkman
- Tyra Lundgren
- Jackie Lynd
- Gösta Millberg
- Gunnar Nylund
- Hilma Persson-Hjelm
- Inger Persson
- Signe Persson-Melin
- Carl-Harry Stalhane
- Pia Törnell
- Bertil Vallien
- Vicken von Post Totten
- Philip von Schantz
- Christian von Sydow
- Alf Wallander
- Marianne Westman
- Gun von Wittrock

== Gallery ==
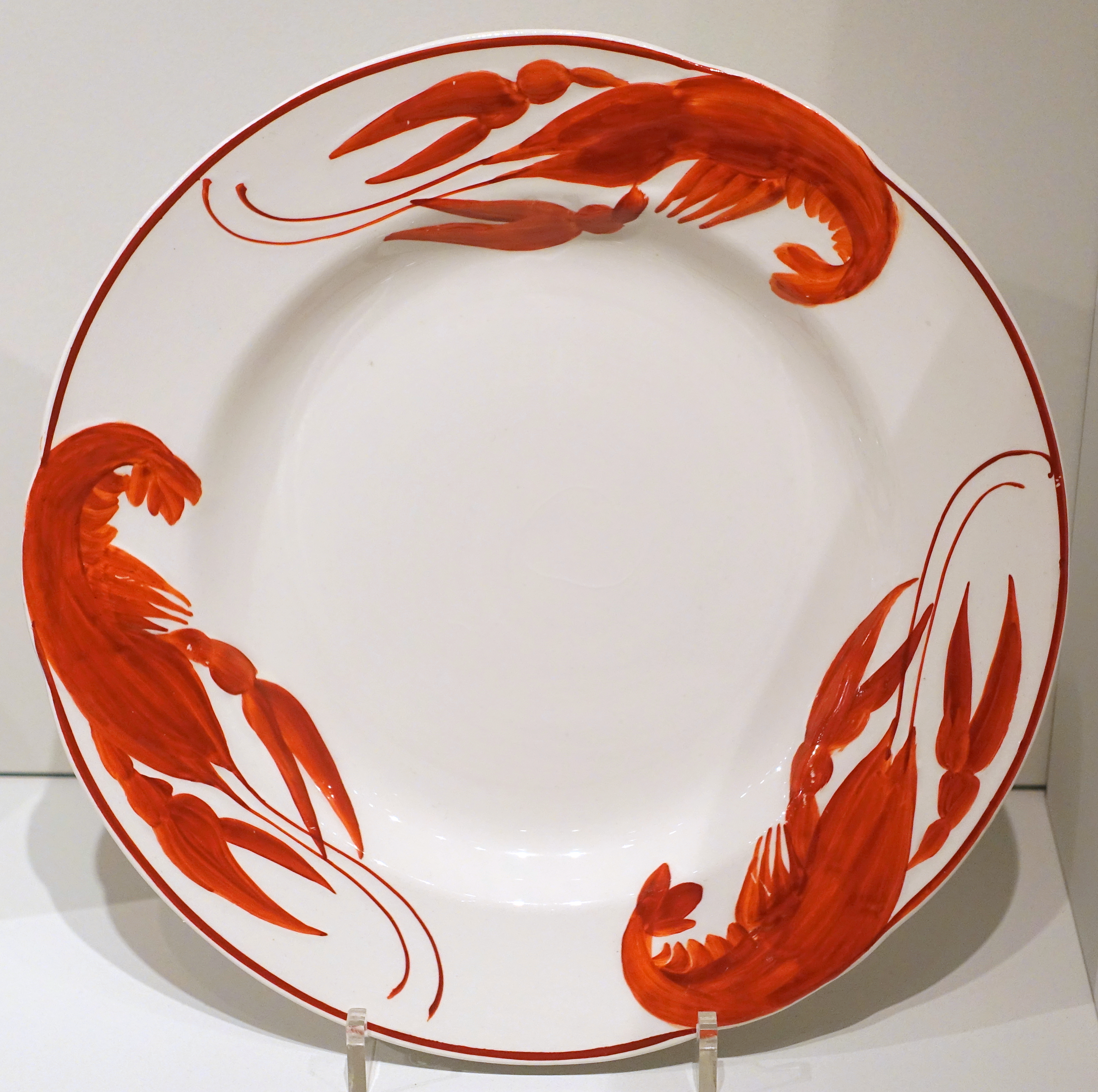
Crayfish plate, unknown designer, Rorstrand, 1908-1939, creamware

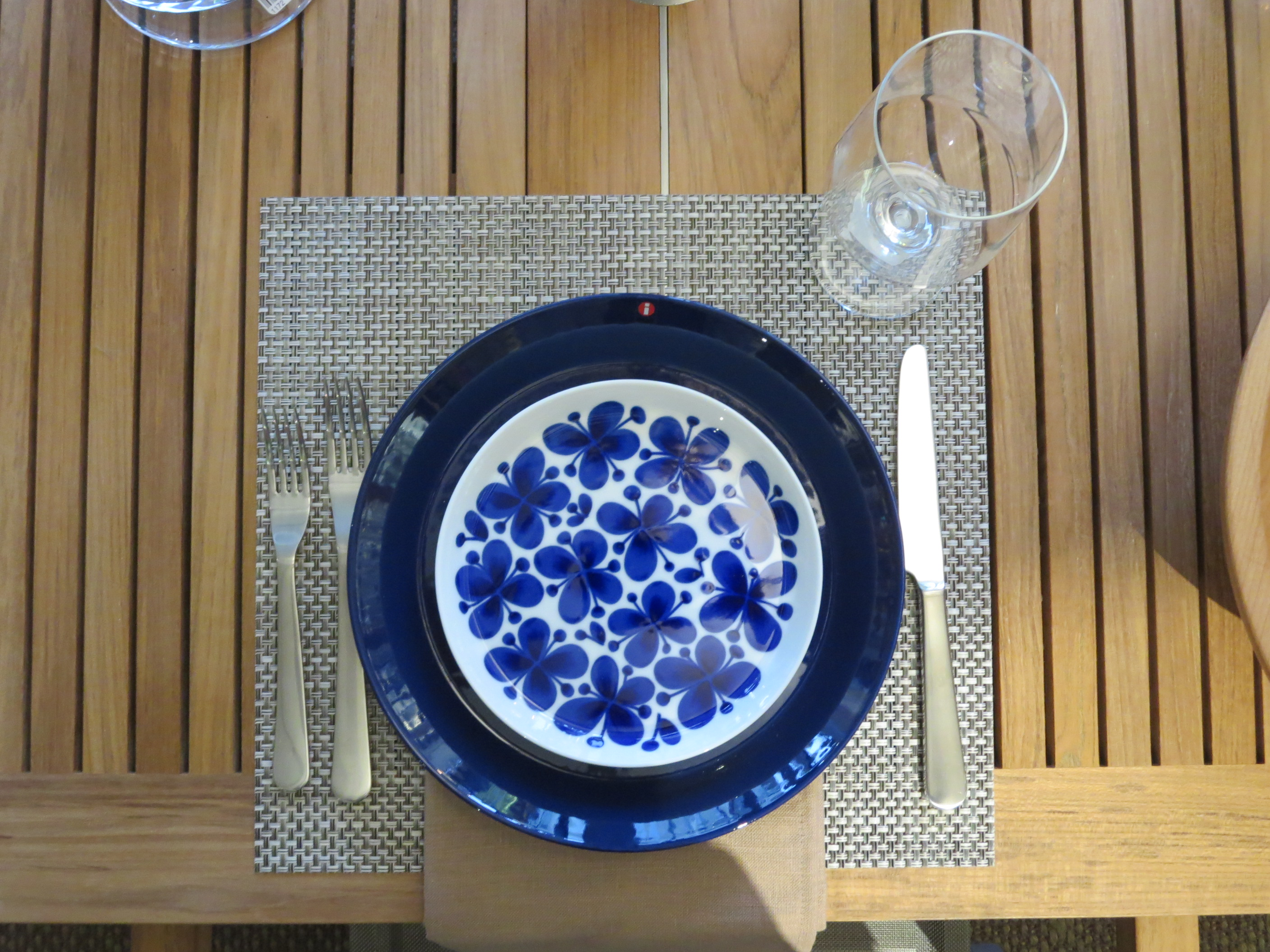
A plate from Rorstrand's Mon Ami line, designed by Marianne Westman

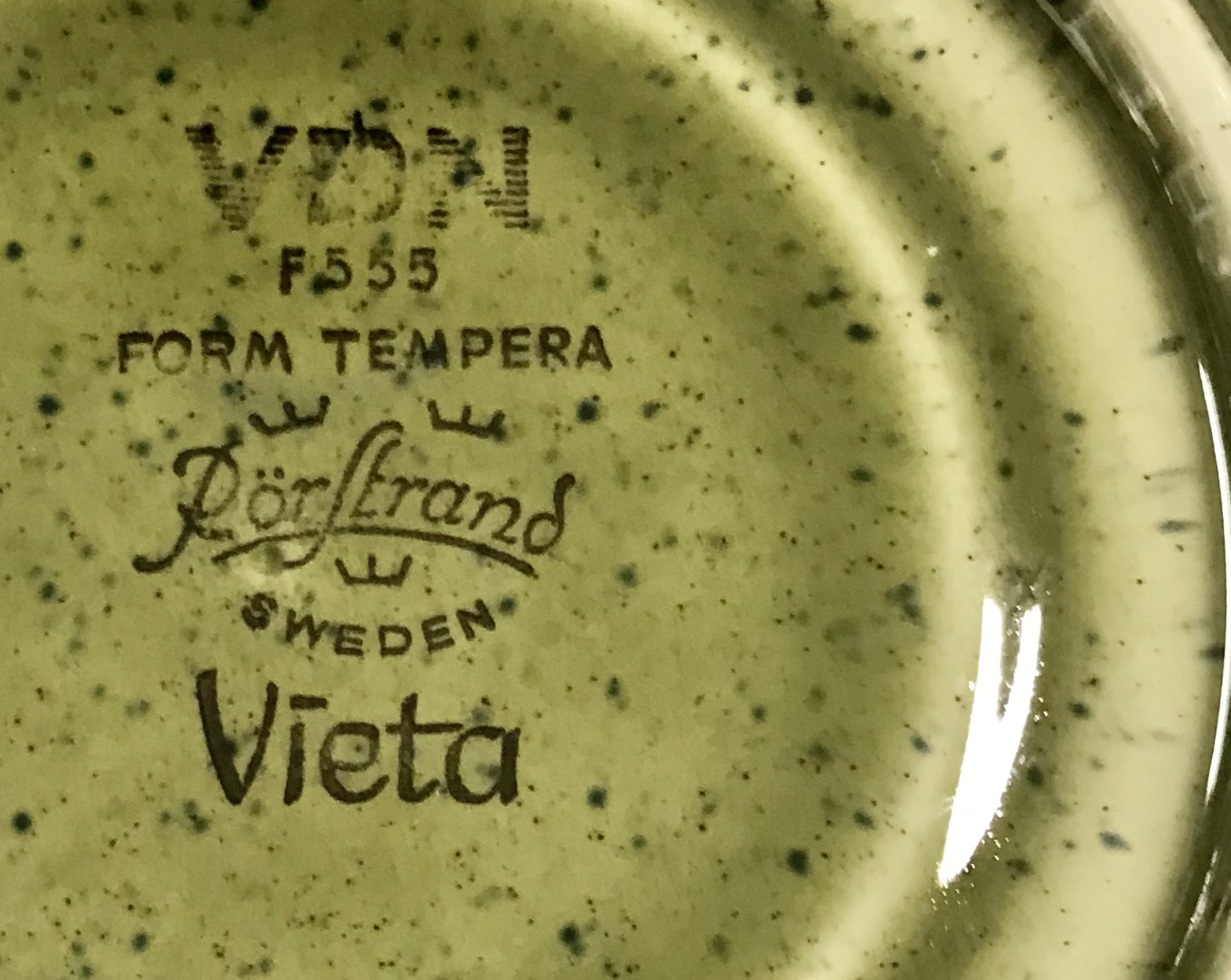
A Rörstrand mark on the bottom of a piece from the Vieta line, Carl Harry Stalhane

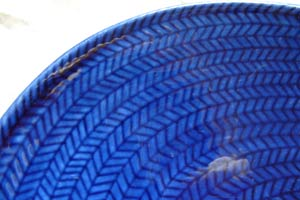
A detail of the braided detail on a piece from the "Blå Eld" (Blue Fire) line.

== See also ==
- Porcelain manufacturing companies in Europe
