= Alf Wallander =

Swedish painter, graphic designer, craftsman, and art conservator (1862-1914)

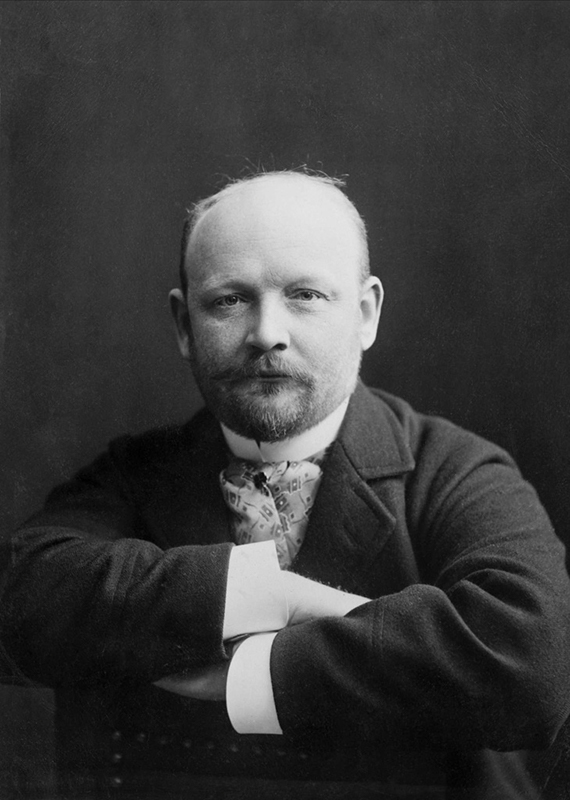
Alf Wallander (1910)

Alf Wallander (11 October 1862, Stockholm - 29 September 1914, Stockholm) was a Swedish painter, graphic designer, craftsman, and art conservator.

== Biography ==
He was born to the architect Adolf Wallander and his wife, Hildegard Sofia née Blom. His uncle, Josef Wilhelm Wallander, and his grandfather, Pehr Wallander, were also painters.

From 1880 to 1885, he studied at the Royal Swedish Academy of Fine Arts, where his uncle was one of his teachers. Then, from 1885 to 1889, he was in Paris where he studied with Aimé Morot and Jean-Joseph Benjamin-Constant. He had his first showing at the Salon in 1889. This was followed by a showing at the Exposition Universelle, where he was awarded first prize for his pastel painting "Old Beggar Man".

When he returned to Sweden in 1890, he joined the "Opponenterna", a group that was highly critical of the Swedish Academy's teaching methods. He was also a member of the Konstnärsförbundet. Under the influence of his friend, Oscar Björck, he adopted the Symbolist style. From 1895 to 1896, he studied etching with Axel Tallberg and became an art assistant at the Rörstrand porcelain manufactory. Over the next ten years, he worked in the Art Nouveau style. In 1900 he was named the art director at Rörstrand. For several years, from 1908, he was also active at Kosta glasbruk.

From 1910 until his death he was a curator for the "Sveriges allmänna konstförening", a non-profit artists' organization, and taught freehand drawing at the Technical School. In 1910, together with his wife, Gerda, who was also a painter, he exhibited at the Konstnärshuset. He also participated in exhibitions in France, Germany and the United States.

In addition to his paintings and ceramics, he designed several table and coffee services, and tableware.

His works may be seen at the Göteborgs konstmuseum, Hallwyl Museum, Nationalmuseum and the Nordic Museum, as well as museums in Minneapolis, Abu Dhabi and Lübeck.

His son, Sven, was a well-known architect. He is interred in the family plot at Solna Church.

== Selected works ==
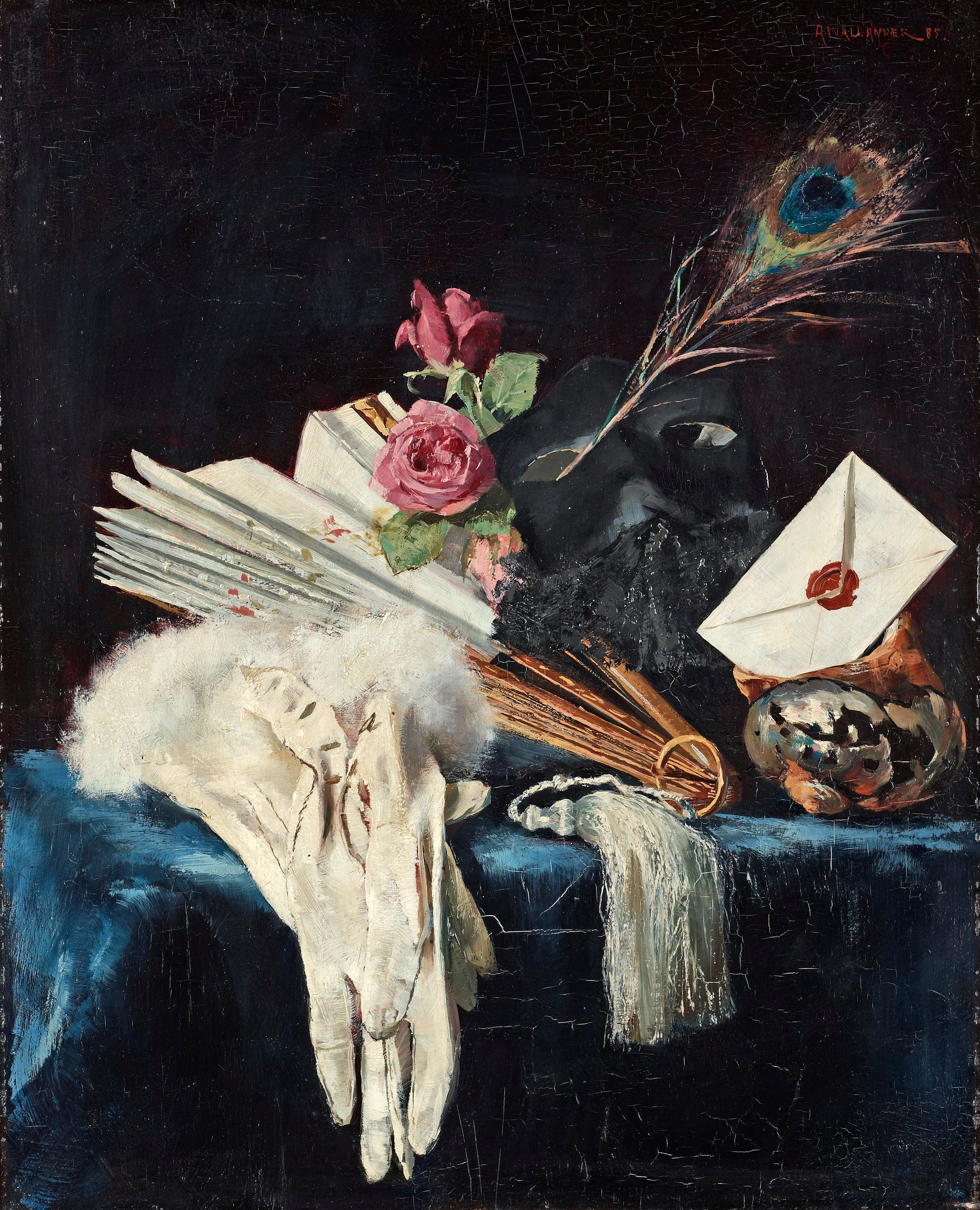
Still Life with Fan, Roses and a Peacock Feather (1885)

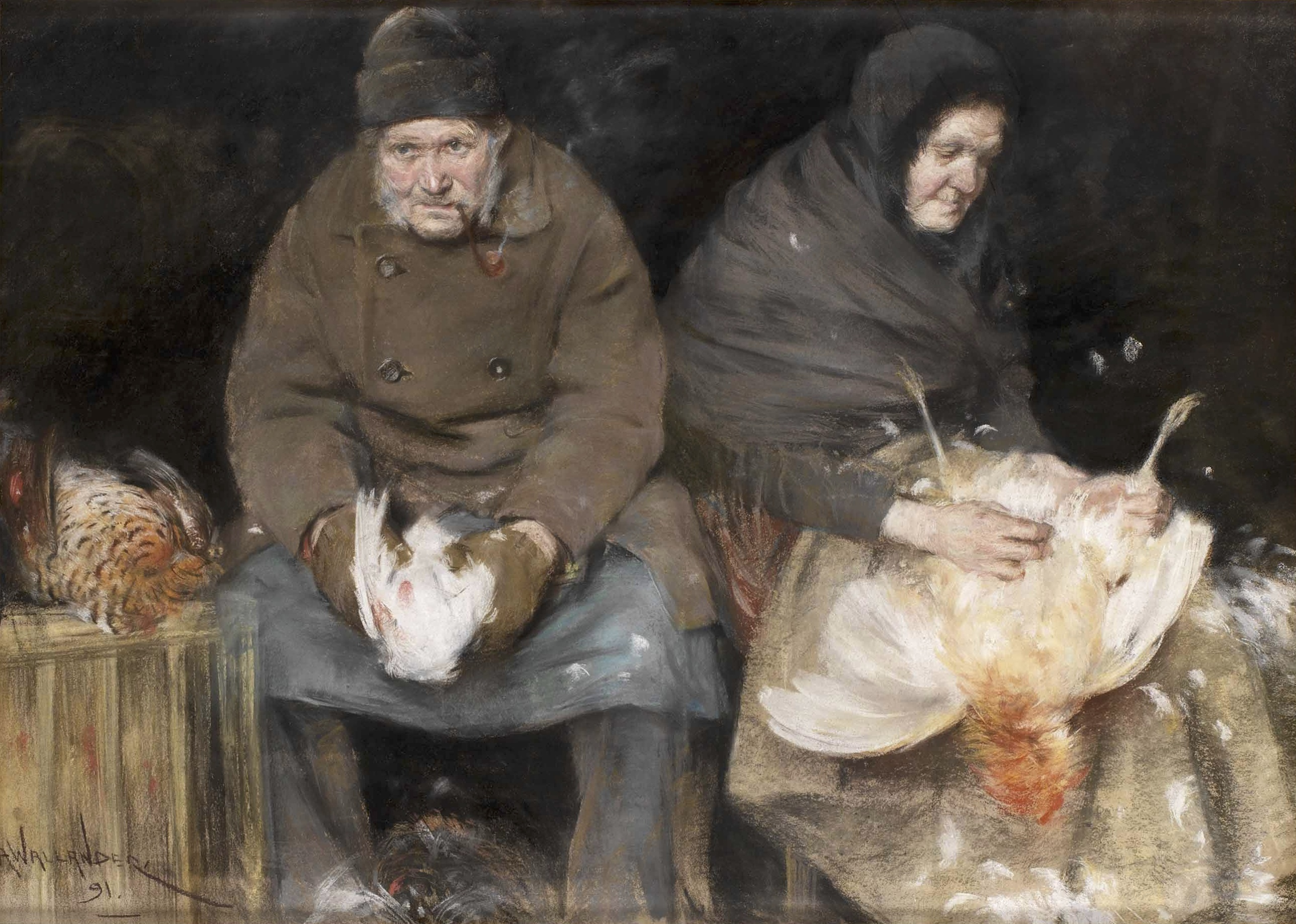
Bird Merchant (1891)

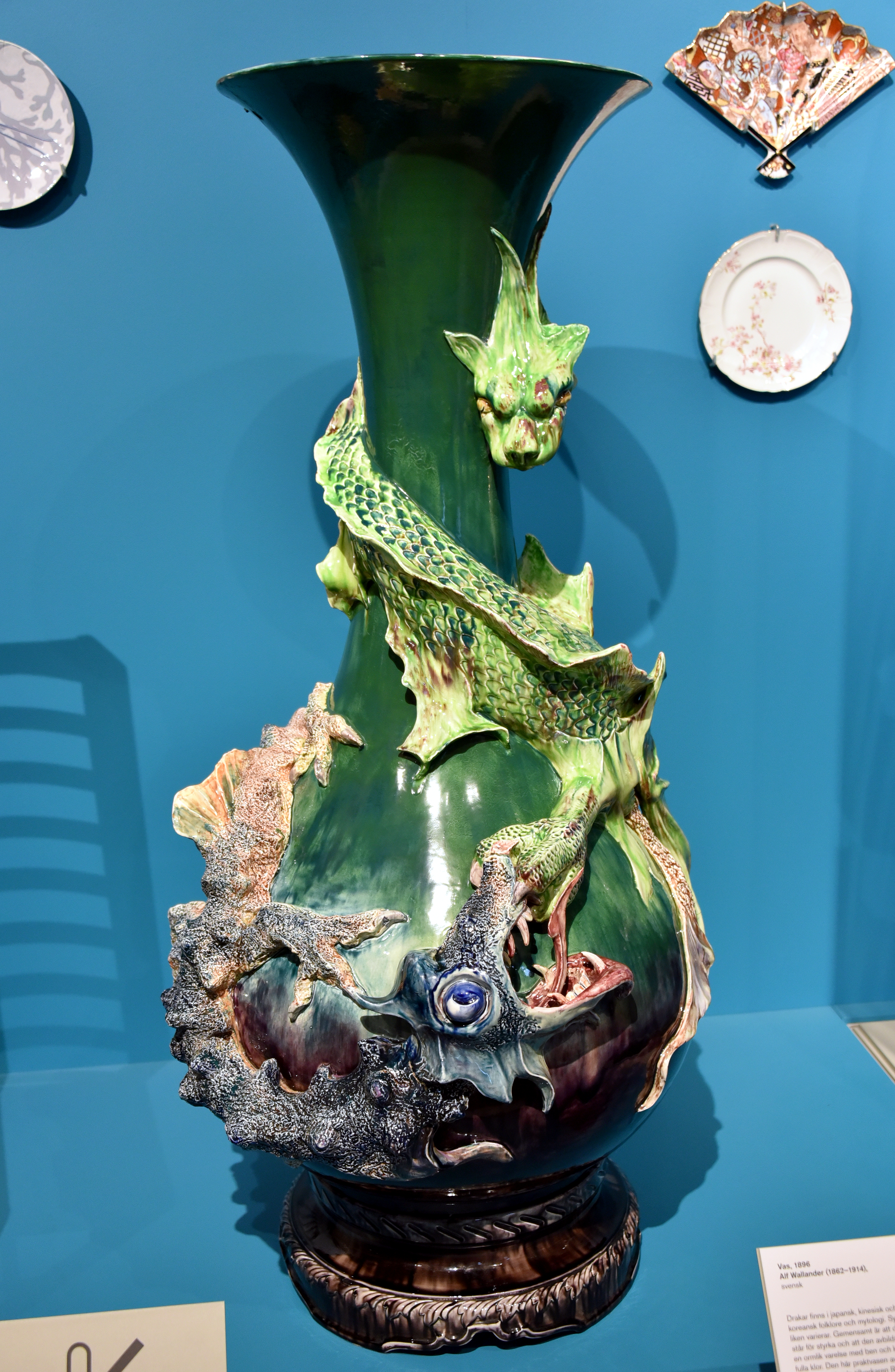
Vase (1896) Nationalmuseum

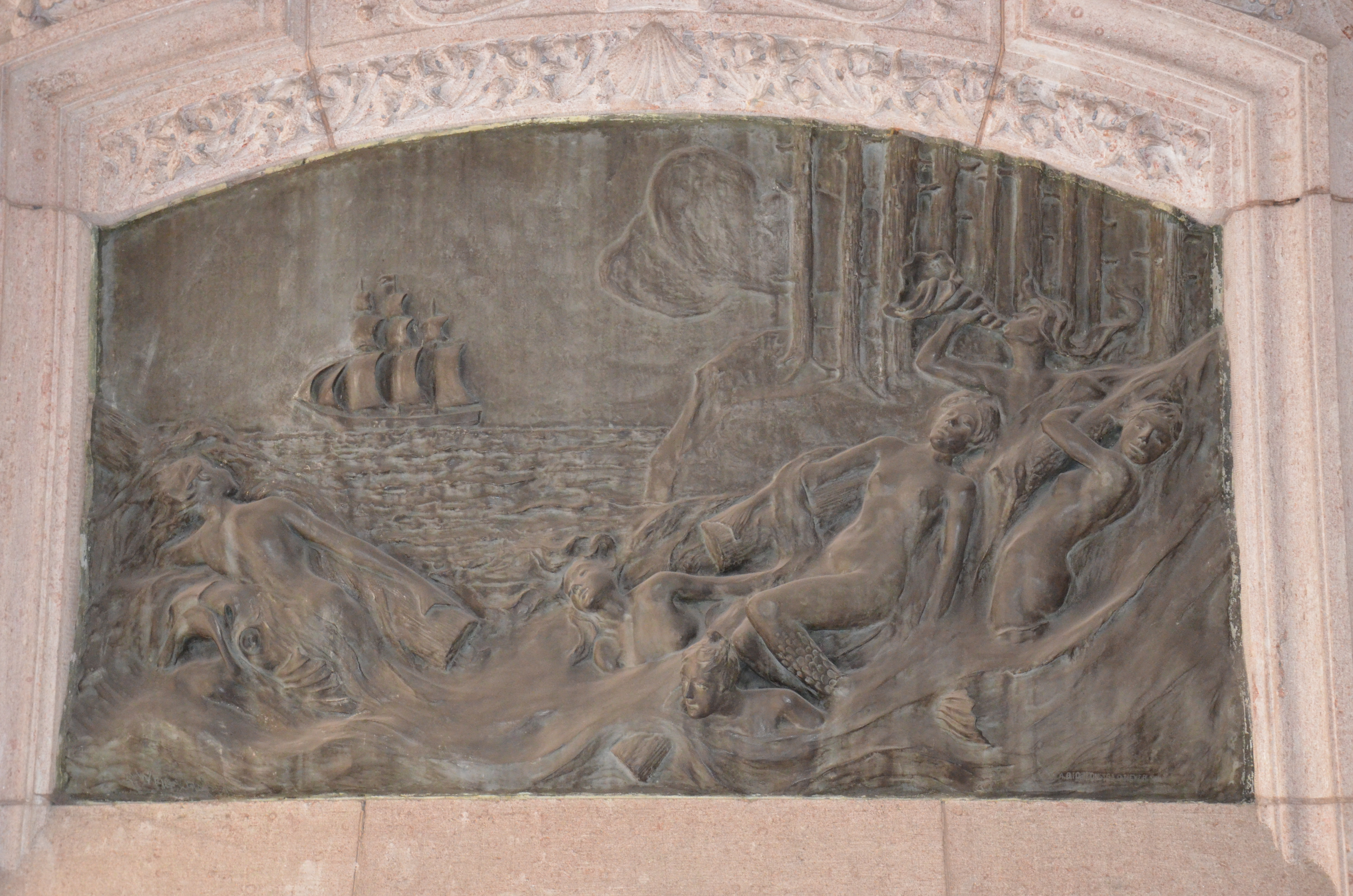
Bronze relief: The Timber Shipment, Hallwyl Museum (1898)

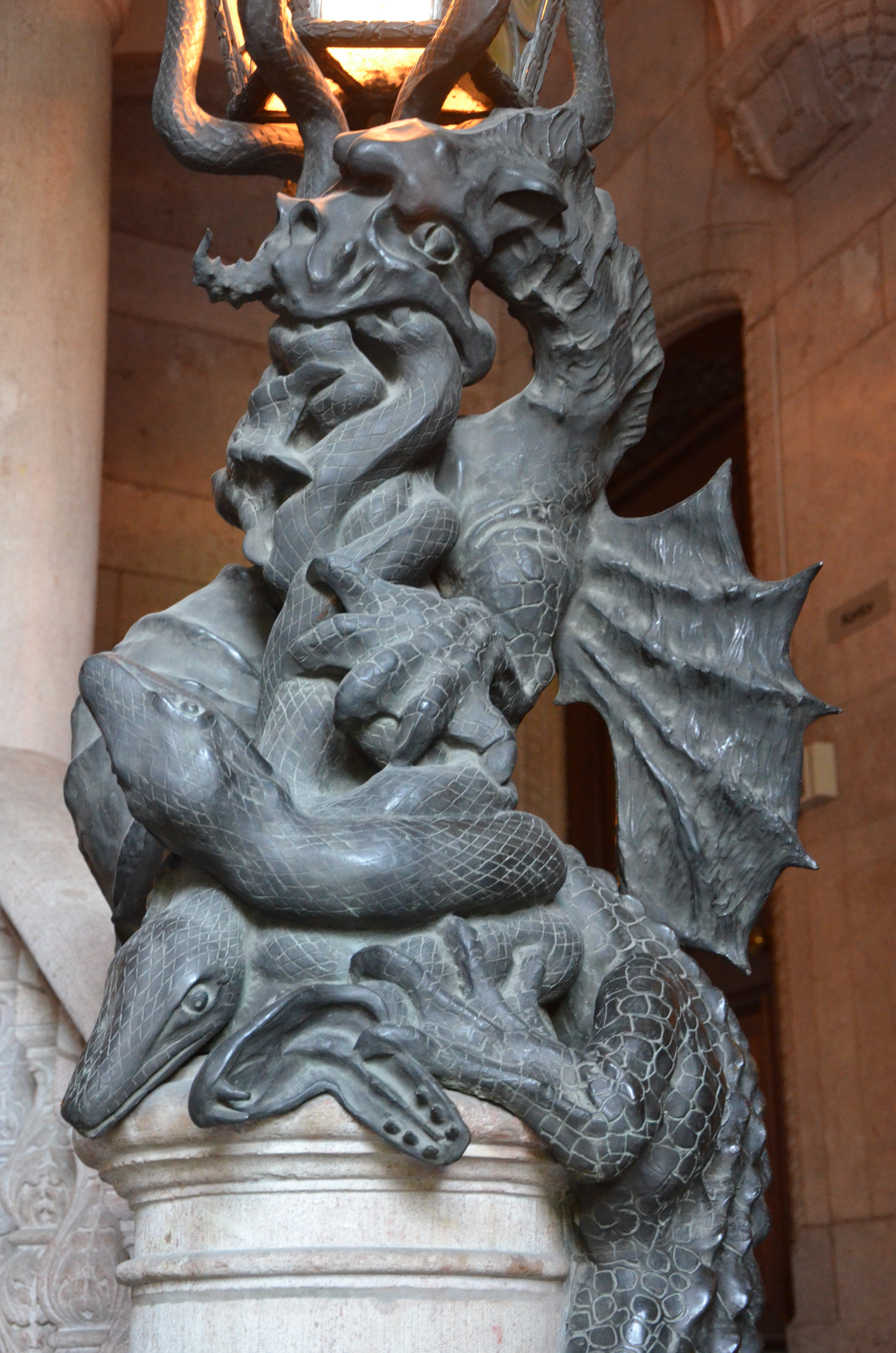
Detail of a lantern sculpture, Hallwyl Museum

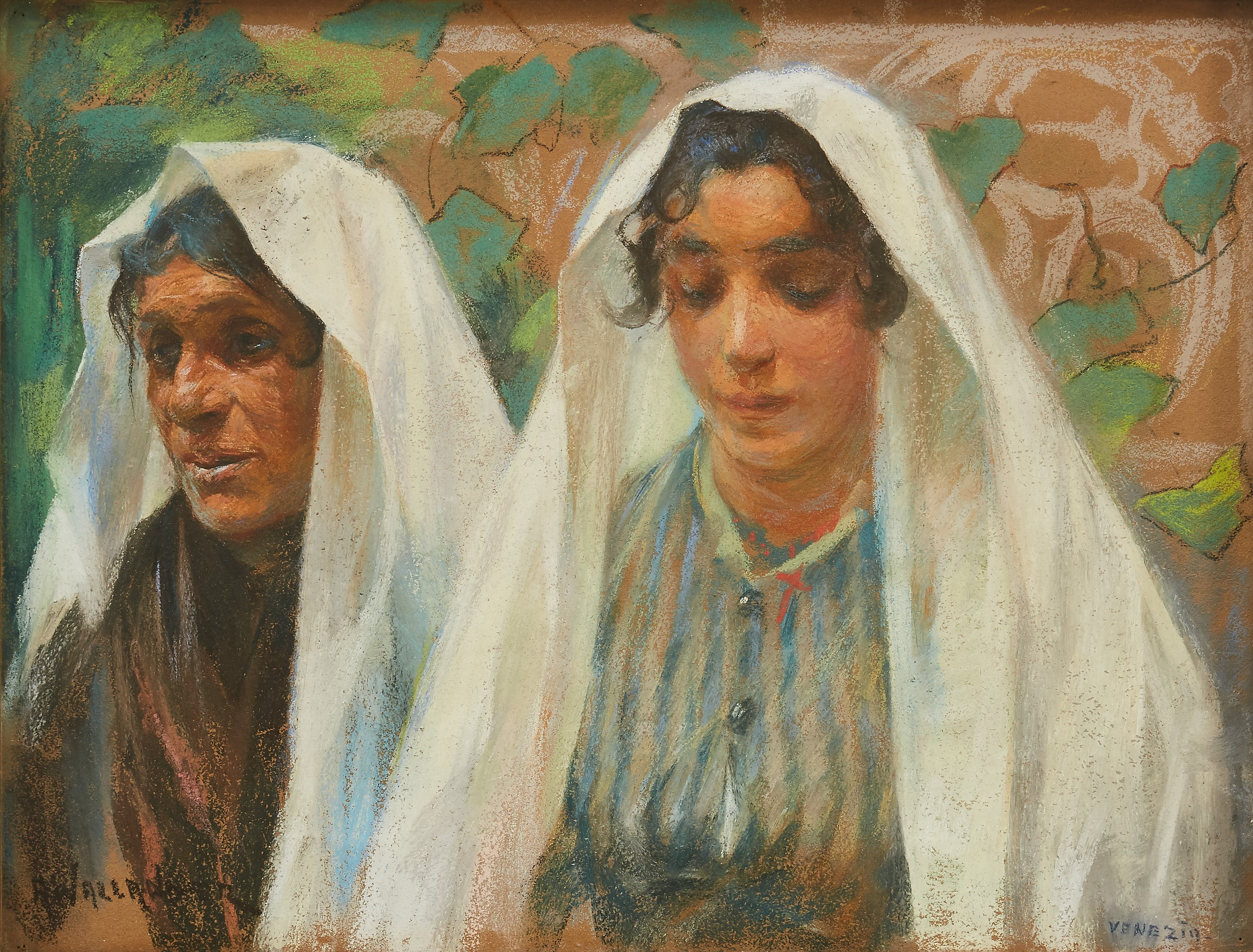
Two Venetian Women (pastel)
