= Try Again (Dilba song) =

Single by Dilba
- Released: February 2011
- Genre: pop
- Songwriters: Niklas Petterson, Linda Sonnvik

Dilba singles chronology
"I'm Sorry" (2011)	"Try Again" (2011)

"Try Again" is a song written by Niklas Petterson and Linda Sonnvik, and performed by Dilba in the first semifinal of Melodifestivalen 2011 in Luleå. The song ended up at the last position in the semifinal, not reaching the final inside the Stockholm Globe Arena.

During the 7th week of 2011, the song entered the second place of Digilistan. On 6 March 2011, the song entered Svensktoppen. The song also topped the iTunes sales-chart for several days and at the Labyrint chart, the song was voted number one during the 7th week of 2011.

The song was also released as part of an EP.

During Melodifestivalen 2012 the song was part of "Tredje chansen", and was performed by Meja & Soundtrack of Our Lives during the first semifinal in Växjö and their version was also released as a single.

== Charts ==
Chart (2011)	Peak position
Sweden (Sverigetopplistan)	20
