= Gunnar Nylund =

Swedish ceramic designer (1904–1997)

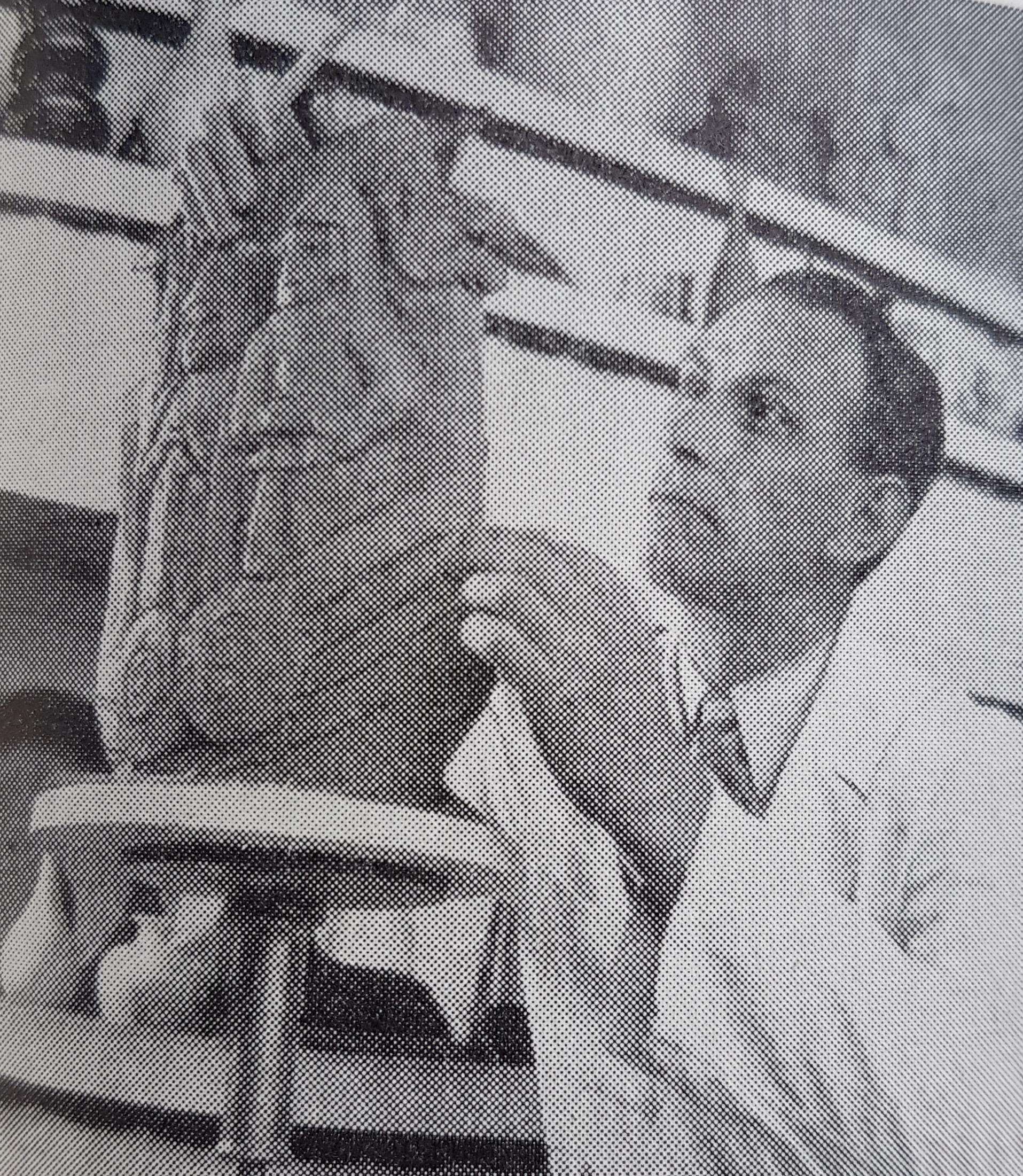

Gunnar Nylund (1 May 1904–1997) was a Swedish ceramic designer since the 1930s, best known as the artistic director of Rörstrand, and was already a well-established ceramic artist in Denmark first at the Bing & Grøndahl Porcelain factory in Copenhagen 1925–28. Later, in 1928, in collaboration with chemist Nathalie Krebs, he started a ceramics workshop, which became Saxbo in 1930, which kept making his stoneware until 1932. Nylund worked for Rörstrand from 1931–1955, the majority of the time as artistic director. He became well known for his new matte feldspar glazed stoneware in hare's fur and crystal glazes and for his stoneware animal sculptures.

Over five decades, Nylund crafted some 30 reliefs and sculptures commissioned for public spaces. Moreover, in the 1940s he was commissioned to do several freelance projects, including designing bathroom fixtures and interiors for the Swedish bathroom manufacturer Ifö. He also designed a number of products for refrigerator use. From 1955, he was artistic director for Strömbergshyttans glassworks in Hovmantorp, and later freelanced for the company. In the early 1960s, Nylund returned to Copenhagen. There he started producing stoneware for Nymölle Keramiska Fabrik in Lyngby. After a change of ownership at Rörstrand in the mid-1960s, he re-turned to Nymölle as a freelancer, producing a more industrial class type of stoneware. At this time he also created Europe's largest stoneware fountain the “Scanisarius” in Bromölla, Sweden.

== Background ==
Nylund was born in Paris in 1904, where his Danish mother, the artist Fernanda Jacobsen-Nylund and his Finland-Swedish father, the sculptor Felix Nylund, were studying. In 1917, the family moved to Copenhagen, moving later to Helsinki, where Nylund attended elementary school. When the Finnish civil war broke out, he moved with his mother in 1918 to Denmark and continued his studies at boarding school. Following graduation in 1923 and completing an architecture internship and studies in ceramics in Helsinki, he started studying architecture at the Royal Danish Academy of Fine Arts in Charlotteborg, Copenhagen. He became practiced in sculpture by assisting his father Felix, who encouraged him in the study of animals. Nylund did some extra work at the Bing & Grondahl Porcelain factory, designing new products for a Paris exhibition. He was then offered full-time employment by the company and as a result gave up his architecture studies. At Bing & Gröndahl, his mentor was Paul Gauguin's son Jean. Nylund created a few thousand unique pieces at Bing & Gröndahl.

Gunnar Nylund was renowned for his revolutionary stoneware in matte glazes and novel colors, and also for the mass production that Nylund & Krebs started in Patrick Nordström's workshop, which they later took over. Prior to a major exhibition in 1930 at Bo in Copenhagen, they launched SAXBO, a groundbreaking Nordic series of iconic stoneware, mostly undecorated in matte glazes and novel colors.

The SAXBO stoneware generated a lot of attention at a Svenskt Tenn exhibition, the same year that Nylund was recruited to Rörstrand, at that time owned by Arabia. In order to start crafting stoneware the young ceramist was moved to the company's factory in Lidköping, which was relatively unknown at that time and which focused solely on porcelain production. There he succeeded, thanks to his own specially developed technique, to produce the first Swedish matte glazed stoneware and sculptures in shimmering colorful stoneware chamotte, which was very popular and had an important impact on modern Swedish ceramics. Nylund's stoneware at that time featured Song-inspired crackelé and oxblood glazes – pieces that ranged from monumental original sculptures in stoneware chamotte and two-feet high urns to moderately priced miniature vases and bowls. In the mid-1930s, the Chamotte was produced both in series and original sculptures. After a one-year break at Bing & Gröndahl in Denmark, Rörstrand's new chief Fredrik Wehtje managed to get Nylund to return to Lidköping in 1937. Here he designed numerous tableware series and laid the ground for all the factory's 1940s collections, featuring innovative glazes.

== Public works ==
From the mid-1940s, Nylund devoted much of his time to reliefs and other work for the decoration of public spaces, for example the “Theater¬ Cavalcade” at the Malmö Stadsteater, “The Jungle Awakens” now found at the entrance of the library of the University of Agriculture in Uppsala, the “Three Västgöter”, relief for the Västgöta nation Uppsala, “Life in the square” for Lidköping's Sparbank, “Our Times” relief for the Göteborgs-Posten, “Symfonica” relief for the m/s Gripsholm ship, as well as altarpieces, etc., for the Lidköping crematorium, the altar of Skara cathedral and the “Thorn of Crowns”. He also created sculptures such as “St. George and the Dragon” for the National Institute of Arts and Crafts and the “Mermaid” fountain for the National Museum in Stockholm in 1943, a work that has been moved to the Rörstrand museum in Lidköping, where other reliefs such as “The oven is empty” are found.

== Sculptures in museums ==
Most of Nylund's original sculptures in stoneware chamotte ended up in museums, as did much of his other work. For example, the impressive “Lion Head” is found at the National Museum in Stockholm, “Blue Bird” is at the Sèvres museum in Paris, his antelope head “Abyssinian mountain nyala”, is at the Röhsska museet in Gothenburg and the “Hamadryas Baboon” is at the Malmö Museum. The museum in Riga is home to the ”Magnus Gabriel de la Gardie”, and the Danish Museum of Art & Design houses the “Hannover” portrait, among other works. His piece “Bulls head in oxblood” was bought by the Ateneum museum in Helsinki. And a lot of his other work can be found at other museums around the world.

== Literature exhibitions ==
Gunnar Nylund's work and a number of his many tableware collections and kitchen series are included in most reference books on 20th century ceramics. However, such information contains inaccuracies, which is why he has elected to publish his memoires. In the book he tells of his life and most of his work in conversation with his daughter Bie Nylund. The book also contains press clippings as well as a lot of photographs cataloging Nylund's great collections primarily from his half century with Rörstrand as well as his other activities, even after 1970 - as a pensioner with a workshop in Lomma, Sweden. He describes the many exhibitions he designed and arranged. The book is expected to be published at the end of 2012/early 2013 in conjunction with the anniversary of his most important Swedish exhibitions: Gallerie Moderne in Stockholm, Röhsska museum in Gothenburg 1932-33 and the chamotte exhibition in the mid-1930s, and the hugely successful exhibition “Rörstrand through three centuries” at the National Museum in Stockholm 1943.

== See also ==
- Ceramic art
- Bing & Grøndahl
- Rörstrand

== Bibliography ==
- Felix Nylund, Liv och Verk Föreningen Konstsamfundets Publikationsserie VIII Helsingförs 1990 ISBN 951-95948-2-5
- Gunnar Nylunds Memoires
