= Herman Nilsson-Ehle =

Swedish geneticist (1873–1949)

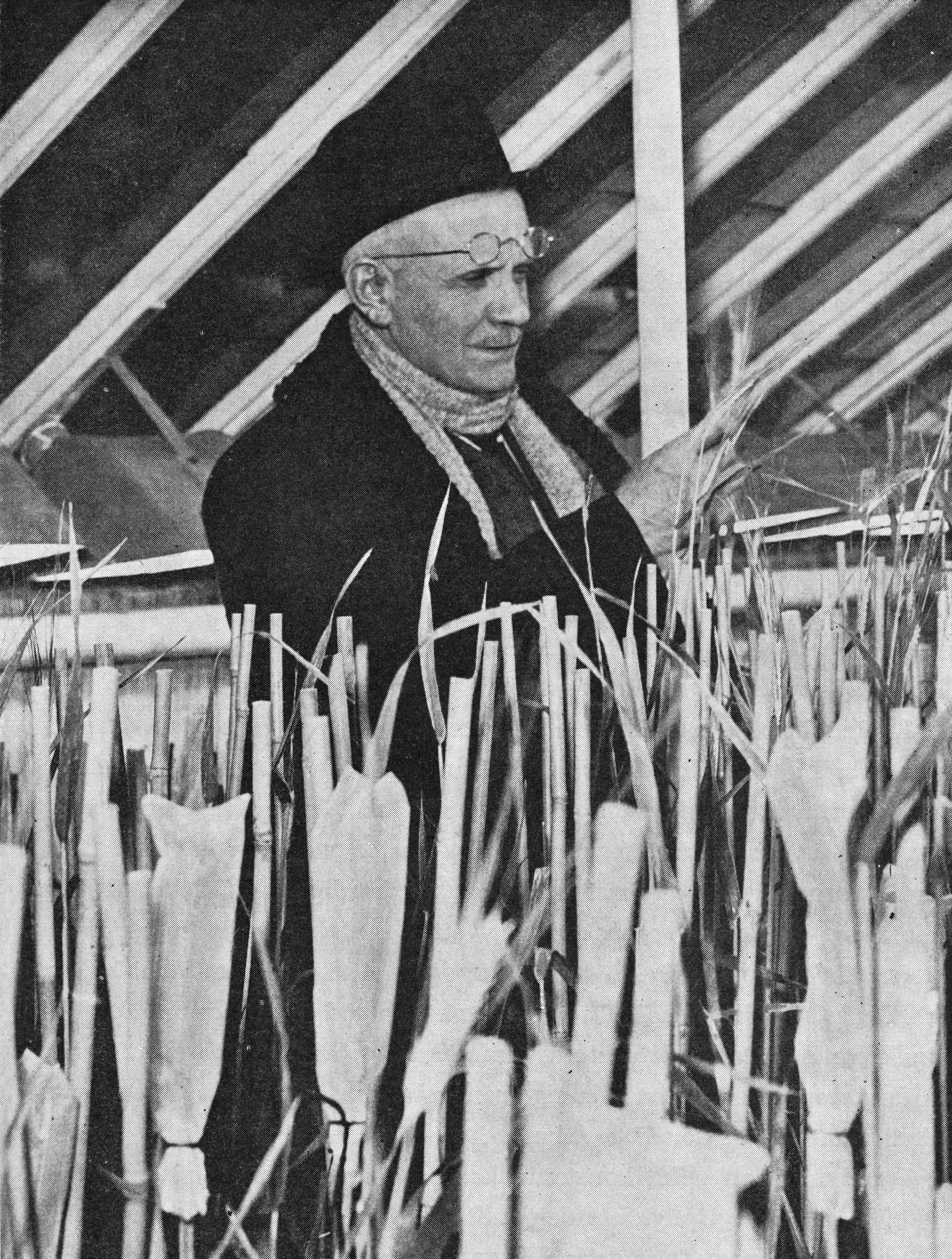
Nilsson-Ehle at work

Nils Herman Nilsson-Ehle (12 February 1873 – 29 December 1949) was a Swedish plant breeder and geneticist. He was a professor at Lund University and was also a proponent of eugenics.

Nilsson was born in Skurup and educated at the University of Lund and as a student he joined the 1898-99 Jonas Stadling expedition to Siberia. He then became a plant breeder at the Swedish plant breeding institute in Svalöv, which was established in 1886 under Hjalmar Nilsson, working there until 1915. He attempted to induce mutations in seeds by sending them up high in the atmosphere in hot-air balloons in the hope that cosmic rays would alter their genes. He then became head of botany at the University of Lund followed by a position as professor of genetics at Akarp. He noted polygenic trait inheritance. He became interested in human genetic and helped found a State Institute of Race Biology in Uppsala in 1921 under Herman Lundborg which aimed to work on eugenics, the improvement of the genetic quality of the people. When Hitler came to power in German, both Lundborg and Nilsson-Ehle supported the idea of racial purity and the Kaiser Wilhelm Institute founded in 1927 in Germany was modelled on the Swedish institution.
