= Dilsa Demirbag Sten =

Kurdish-Swedish author and journalist

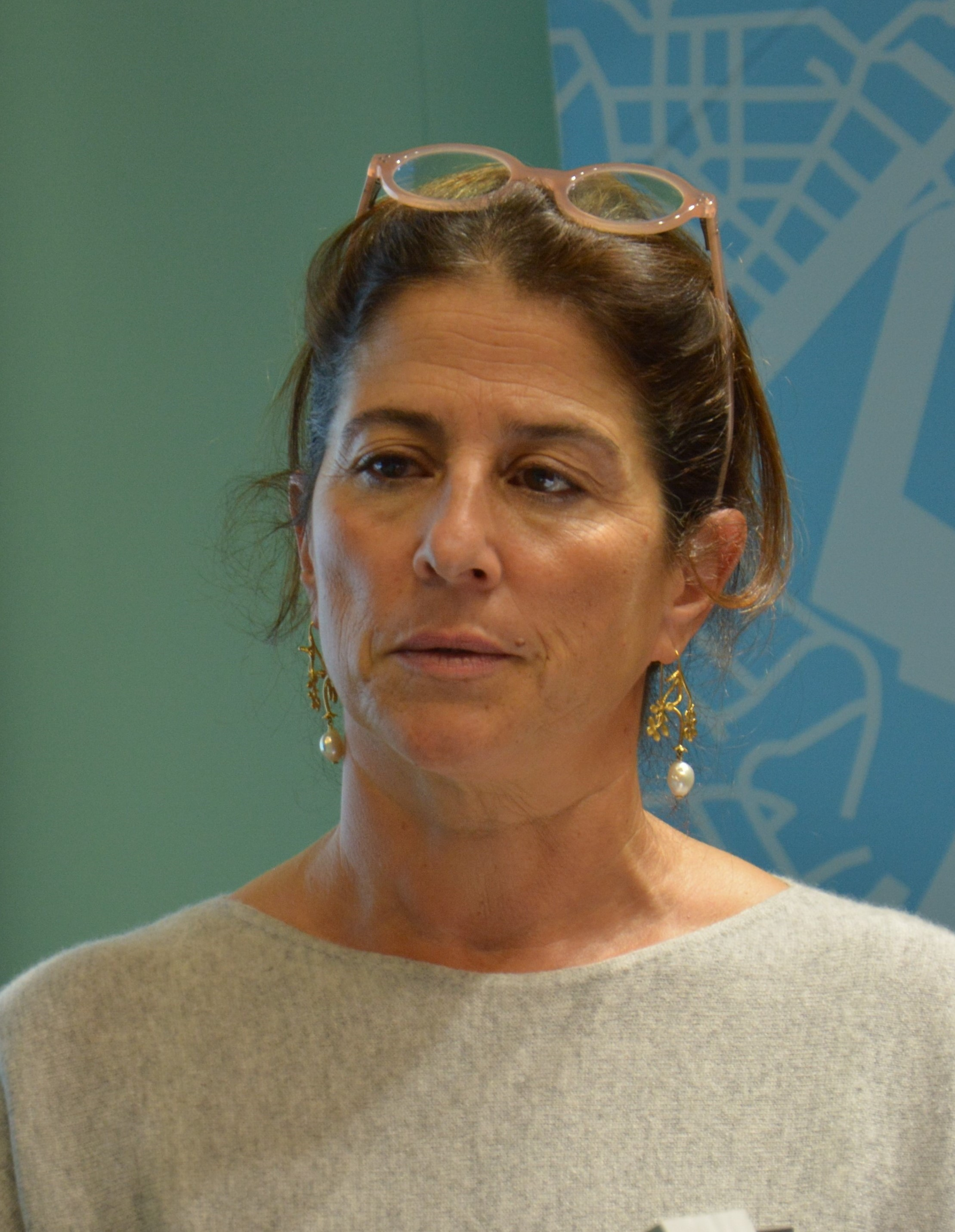
- Born: 1969 (age 56–57); Midyat, Turkey
- Occupations: Author, journalist, director

Dilşa Demirbağ-Sten is a Kurdish-Swedish author and journalist. She is the Secretary General of Berättarministeriet, a foundation she co-founded together with Robert Weil and Sven Hagströmer in 2011.

In 2019, she became a member of the Swedish Press Council and is a member of the reference group for the Swedish government agency Delegation against segregation since 2018. She is also a member of the expert council to The Swedish Crown Princess Couple's Foundation. Dilsa Demirbag-Sten is a former member of the Swedish Globalization Council, has been a member of the reference group for the Swedish government agency Kulturrådet. Demirbag-Sten is a former board member of the AllBright foundation the National Swedish Touring Theatre, the Swedish Institute, Linnéuniversitetet, the Swedish Red Cross, the Swedish Humanist Association as well as from the Think Tank FORES. In April 2019, she was appointed a board member of the Nobel Center Foundation.

Demirbag-Sten has a background in journalism and has been a frequent contributor in Swedish newspapers such as Expressen, Östgöta Correspondenten, Göteborgs-Posten, Dagens Nyheter, Fokus and Axess. She has worked at the National Swedish Touring Theatre, Amnesty International and as a special adviser to the former Swedish Minister for Integration Leif Blomberg. She holds a Bachelor of Arts degree in political science and history from Stockholm University.

== Accolades ==
- 2019: KTH Great Prize (Royal institute of Technology's great prize)
- 2018: Awarded the St:Erik medal for her contributions to Stockholm county.
- 2017: Demirbag-Sten was awarded the Astrid Lindgren scholarship for her writing.
- 2016: Awarded "Eldsjälspriset" by the Oscar Hirsch Memory foundation for her contribution to society through Berättarministeriet.
- 2012: Awarded Frihetspennan in the memory of Torgny Segerstedt for her writing.
- 2012: Alumni of the year, Karlstad University
- 2012: Bild och Ord Akademin Ann-Marie Lunds Encyklopedipris
- 2011: Stockholm County award "Månadens Stockholmare" September
- 2010: Natur och Kulturs Johan Hansson-pris för boken Fosterland
- 2010: Magen David Adom utmärkelsen som "Årets Livräddare"
- 2009: Advokatsamfundets journalistpris
- 2002: Axel and Margret Ax:son Johnson Foundation’s award of SEK 100 000

== Works ==
- Stamtavlor 2005 Norstedts
- Fosterland 2010 Bonniers
- Svenska – en nödvändighet 1995 Stift. Non-Violence Sweden

=== As co-writer ===
- Från Alfons till Dostojevskij. Co-writer. Rädda Barnen ISBN 91-89366-14-X
- Makten framför allt. Co-writer. W&W
- Violence in The Name of Honour. Co-writer. Istanbul Bilgi University Press
- Tystade röster. Co-writer. Tranan. ISBN 978-91-85133-13-0
- Handbook against Violence, Department of Justice (editorial contribution)
- Till frihetens försvar: En kritik av den normativa mångkulturalismen Norstedts (tillsammans med Per Bauhn)
