= Josef Wilhelm Wallander =

Swedish artist and painter

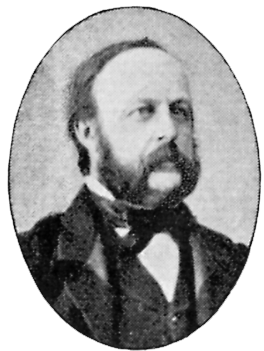
Josef Wilhelm Wallander, from the Svenskt Porträttgalleri

Josef Wilhelm Wallander (15 May 1821 – 6 February 1888) was a Swedish painter, graphic artist and art professor who specialized in rural genre scenes.

== Biography ==
He was born in Stockholm. His father was the painter Pehr Wallander (1783–1858), who planned for him to become an architect, but also wanted him to have practical skills. In pursuit of that, he was apprenticed to a bricklayer in the summers and studied architecture at the Royal Swedish Academy of Fine Arts in the winter. To help support the family, he and his sister Charlotta were trained in drawing and lithography and put to work doing portraits and magazine illustrations.

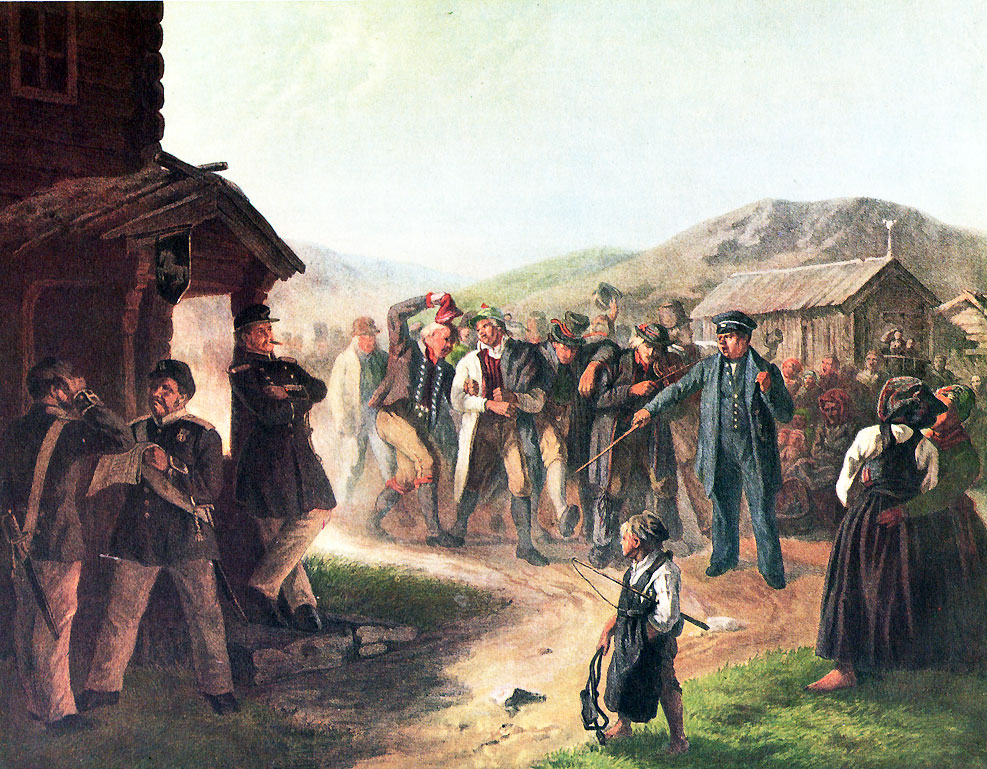
Conscripted Boys in Dalarna

His education at the Academy continued until 1840, when he participated in a competition to design a new detention center for the municipality. Two years later, he became a Journeyman mason, but by then he had decided to become an artist. Although he had done well at the Academy, he was unable to secure the scholarship he would need for continuing his studies abroad.

During a visit to Sävstaholm Castle in 1847, he came to the attention of Count Gustaf Trolle-Bonde, who hired him to copy and restore the 16th- and 17th-century paintings on the castle's walls. During the five years it took to complete this project, he became enamored of the local peasant farmers and their families. Soon, he began doing sketches and watercolors of their life and traditional costumes. He himself became a local character around the castle environs and in nearby Kjesäter, where he would entertain by singing, playing piano, acting and dancing.

Thanks to his earnings from that project, he was able to travel to Düsseldorf, where he studied with Rudolf Jordan, who shared his interest in folk life. He would make sketches in the countryside and turn them into paintings at Jordan's studio. He stayed there for nine years, but made numerous trips back to Sweden as well as to Paris and Italy. During this time, he also did illustrations for Den sista färden eller Döddansen (The Last Journey or, The Death Dance) by August Blanche A series of illustrations was made for a new edition of the works of Carl Michael Bellman. The project never came to fruition, but he converted several of his drawings to oil paintings.

In 1859, he was named a member of the Royal Academy. He returned to Stockholm in 1862 and participated in numerous exhibitions. He also held a showing at the Salon in Paris. From 1867 to 1886, he served as a Professor.

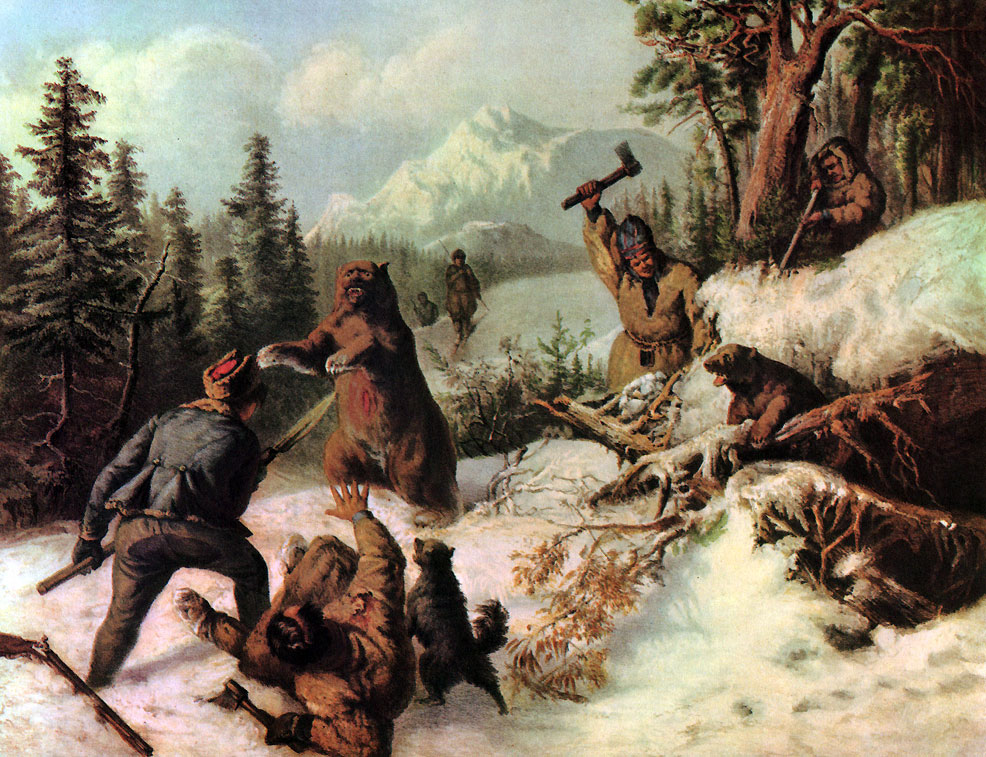
Bear Hunting in Jämtland

In 1885, he refused to sign a petition put forward by a group called the "Opponenterna", criticizing the teaching methods and styles taught at the Royal Academy. His nephew Alf Wallander, joined the group, which caused him great disappointment. That same year, his health began to noticeably decline. He died in Stockholm in 1888.

A retrospective was held by the Stockholms konstförening in 1888. His works may be seen at the Nationalmuseum, the Nordiska museet, Uppsala University Library and the Göteborgs konstmuseum, among many others.

== Sources ==
- Svenskt konstnärslexikon Part V, pgs.561-563, Allhems Förlag, Malmö
