= Eva Stæhr-Nielsen =

Danish ceramic artist (1911–1976)

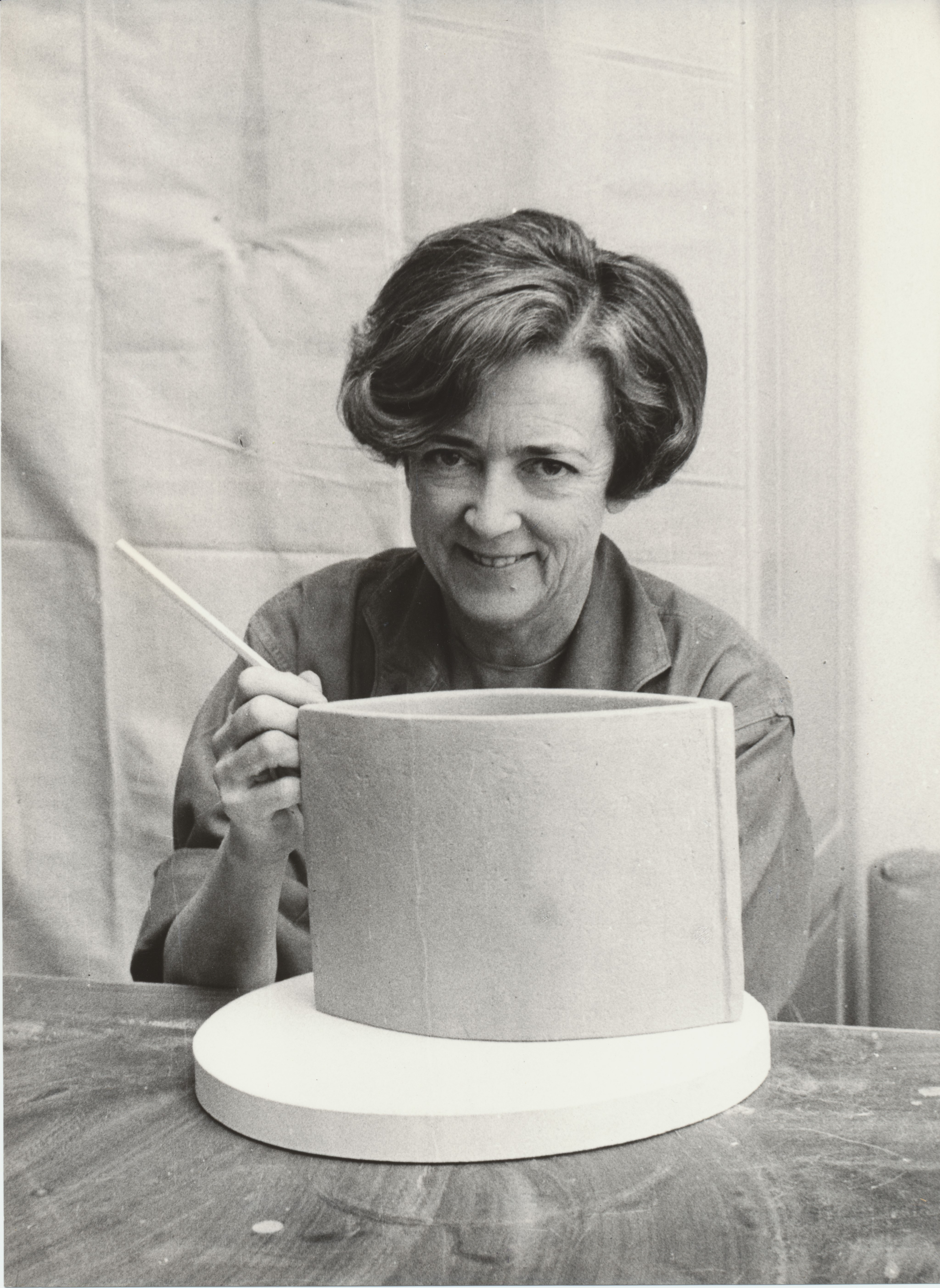
Eva Stæhr-Nielsen

Eva Stæhr-Nielsen, also known as Eva Wilhjelm, (1911–1976) was a Danish ceramic artist.

Her work is included in the collections of the Seattle Art Museum the National Museum of Sweden, and the National Museum of Art, Architecture and Design, Oslo.
