= Upsala-Ekeby =

Upsala-Ekeby AB
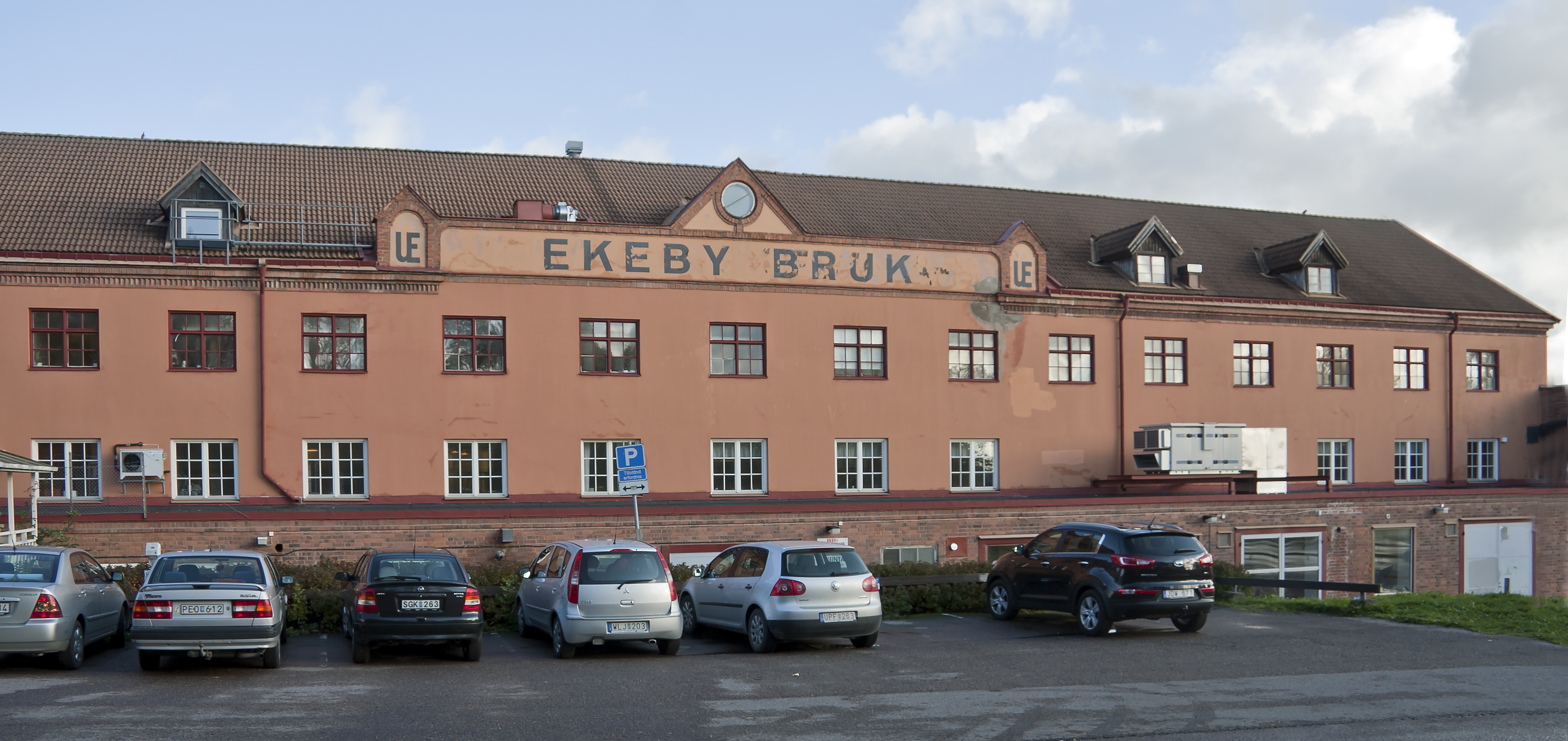
- Former Ekeby factory in 2011
- Industry: Ceramics
- Founded: 1886; 139 years ago
- Defunct: 1980
- Headquarters: Uppsala, Sweden
- Products: Tableware, tile, brick, and glass

Upsala-Ekeby AB was a porcelain, tile, brick, and glass company founded in 1886 in Uppsala, Sweden. From 1910 to 1945, Upsala-Ekeby produced tiled cocklestoves in Ekeby. In 1910, Upsala-Ekeby hired designers for their production of household and art ceramics. Upsala-Ekeby expanded by buying competing companies including Gefle Porcelain AB Group and the AB Karlskrona Porcelain Factory. In 1964, Upsala-Ekeby began a major expansion with the acquisition of the Swedish ceramic company Rörstrand. To expand their tabletop business, Upsala-Ekeby acquired Reijmyre Glassworks, Kosta Boda (glass) and GAB Gense (cutlery).

The Upsala-Ekeby group of companies was acquired by investment company Proventus in 1980. Proventus sold off all of the companies formerly in the Upsala-Ekeby group between 1982-1984.

== History ==
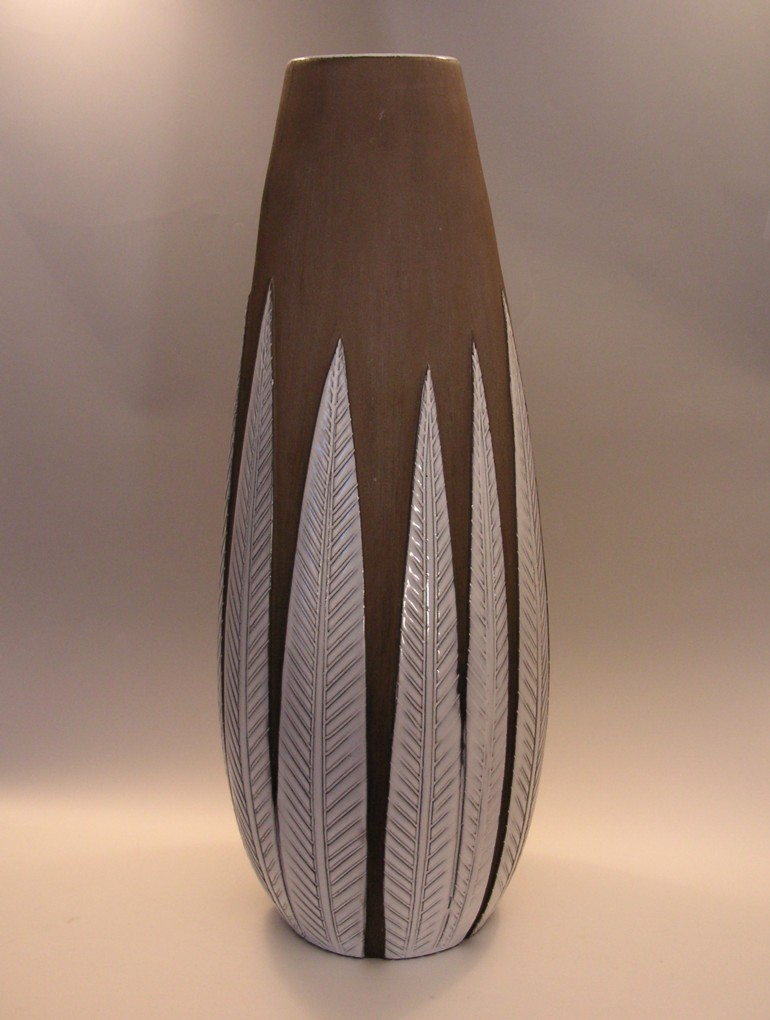
Anna-Lisa Thomson "Paprika" vase, 1948

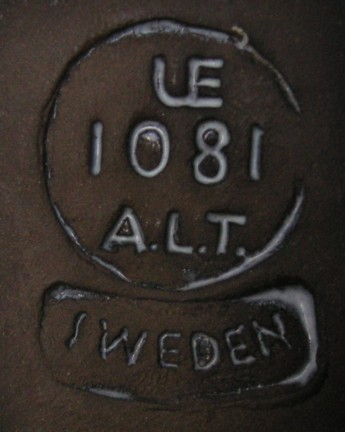
Backstamp on "Paprika" vase

Upsala-Ekeby Ltd. was established on 29 January 1886. Uppsala began with production of bricks and tiles. The raw material for production was within the property, and the clay had been found very suitable for ceramic manufacturing. Among the founders of the company were the famous Uppsala families of von Bahr, Ekstrand and Holm, who for decades was to characterize the company's development into a successful industrial company. Brick Production began the same year the company was founded with ceramic tile the following year. After 1910, the company began a fierce competition to make itself a major competitor on the stove tile market . One of its competitors was the Upsala Tile Factory AB. Upsala-Ekeby bought the competing factory in 1916.

In the 1910s, the company began hiring artists. Among the first was Anna-Lisa Thomson and Sven Erik Skawonius. Stove production declined due to modernization of heat supply by central heating . The last cocklestove was manufactured in 1945. Instead, the tiles become Upsala-Ekebys major new product. Brick production was discontinued in the 1930s.

The manufacture of household and art ceramics over time became successful and Upsala-Ekeby had several skilled designers and potters. All goods produced at Upsala-Ekeby were earthenware clay found near the factory. Upsala-Ekeby marked their wares with "UE", or with only the word "Ekeby". A competitor in Uppsala with similar production as Upsala-Ekeby (brickyards, tile and ceramic factory) was St. Erik Lervarufabriker . In 1937 Upsala-Ekeby bought St. Erik's ceramics factory. Some ornaments from the factory's production continued to be manufactured, but with the UE-stamp.

In 1936, Upsala-Ekeby acquired Gefle Porcelain AB Group and in 1942 the AB Karlskrona Porcelain Factory. When plastic during the postwar period began to form competing materials in some areas for the ceramic industry Upsala-Ekeby in 1947 acquired chemical company AB Synthesis . Synthesis later concentrated on raw material manufacturers for the marine industry.

Several major acquisitions were made in 1964 when the porcelain manufacturer Rörstrand became a part of the Upsala-Ekeby group. Expanding the companies tabletop product lines, Upsala-Ekeby acquired Reijmyre Glassworks, Kosta Boda (glass) and GAB Gense (cutlery). Other parts of Upsala-Ekeby was sold at the same time, including the building materials divisions in 1968 to Beijer Building . The extensive farming that was also part of the group including grain farming and calf rearing at lease farms Kvarnbo, Österby, Flogsta and Steningehöjden were liquidated or sold.

Upsala-Ekebys ceramic manufacturing in Uppsala began in the 1960s in response to growing sales. The manufacture of pottery and flower pots at Ekeby ceased in the early 1970s when the newly built facility Steningehöjden Ceramics AB at Fyrislund area was put into operation, although this plant was discontinued after some time. In 1973, Upsala-Ekeby sold both industrial and residential premises at Ekeby with the right for Upsala-Ekeby to lease the premises over ten years. A gradual abandonment began, and on October 25, 1977 the tile mill at Ekeby was shut down. The old factory building is now a business park that houses a number of small businesses and two high schools.

Upsala-Ekeby closed most of their ceramic factories except for Rörstrand. The Upsala-Ekeby group of companies was acquired by investment company Proventus in 1980. Between 1982-1984 the Upsala-Ekeby group was broken apart. Rörstrand was sold in 1984 to the Finnish company Wärtsilä. Kosta Boda and Gense were sold in 1989 to the investment company Incentive, when Kosta Boda merged with Orrefors.

== Designers ==
- Olle Alberius 1960
- Göran Andersson 1960
- Sigvard Andersson
- Ingrid Atterberg 1944-1963
- Kjell Blomberg 1952-1957
- Gabriel Burmeister 1921-1922
- Dorothy Clough 1954-1957
- Ewald Dahlskog 1910-1920
- Allan Ebeling 1929-1930
- Eva Fahlcrantz 1969-1971
- Einar Forseth 1917 and during the early 1920s
- Paula von Freyman 1962-1964
- Viking Göransson
- Olof Hellström
- Eva Jahnke-Björk
- Helge Johansson
- Taisto Kaasinen 1952-1961
- Vicke Lindstrand 1942-1950
- Ella Lagerman
- Einar Luterkort 1929-1932
- Gertrud Lönegren 1930
- Carl Malmsten
- Lillemor Mannerheim 1952-1959
- Ruth Milles
- Einar Nerman 1910
- Bertil Nilsson
- Hjördis Oldfors 1953-1959
- Edvin Ollers 1917-1918
- Arthur Percy
- Harald Pettersson 1890-1920
- Britt Philipsson 1960
- Hyonsun Rhee 1963-1965
- Greta Runeborg 1937-1941
- Gerhard Sausmark 1959-1962
- Mari Simmulson 1949-1972
- Sven Erik Skawonius 1935-1939 (artistic director from 1953 to 1957 and from 1962 to 1971)
- Eddy Syrén
- Berit Ternell 1960
- Anna-Lisa Thomson 1933-1952
- Rolf Trolle 1920
- Harald Östergren 1923-1947
