= Joseph Knebel =

Joseph Nikolaevich Knebel
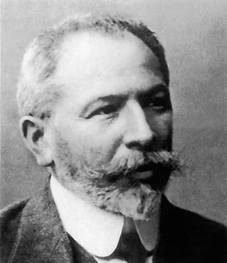
- Joseph Knebel in the 1900s
- Citizenship: Austrian Empire → Russian Empire → Soviet Union
- Education: University of Vienna (1876); Vienna Academy of Commercial Sciences (1878)
- Occupations: Publisher, bookseller
- Organization(s): Grossman and Knebel
- Title: Co-owner (1882–1890); owner (1890–1917)
- Spouse: Sofia Markovna Knebel (née Brenner)
- Children: Elena, Maria, and Nikolai Knebel
- Parent(s): Nikolai Knebel and Lotti Knebel (née Wechsler)

Joseph (Osip) Nikolaevich Knebel (21 September 1854, Buchach, Galicia, Austrian Empire – 14 August 1926, Moscow, Soviet Union) was a Russian publisher and bookseller.

Knebel was born into a Jewish merchant family and received an education in philology and commerce in Vienna. In 1880, he moved to Moscow, where he initially worked in the book trade before entering publishing. Between 1894 and 1918, his publishing house produced approximately 700 books, albums, brochures, printed illustrations, and visual teaching aids.

His firm sold books at retail and wholesale through its Moscow bookshop and a network of warehouses in other cities, as well as by mail order. Knebel specialized in popular science and educational publications, books and albums on the visual arts, children's books, and guidebooks. His major projects included the multivolume History of Russian Art, the Russian Artists series, and the Pictures from Russian History series. His publications were displayed at exhibitions in Russia and abroad. Following the anti-German pogrom in Moscow in 1915, which caused extensive damage to his firm, Knebel reorganized it as a joint-stock company in early 1917. After the October Revolution of 1917, he collaborated with Soviet publishing, cultural, and educational institutions.

Beyond his business activities, Knebel was active in professional, artistic, and literary associations and supported various cultural initiatives. His contemporaries and later scholars praised his contribution to the popularization of the visual arts and the development of fine art publishing, regarding his books and albums as among the finest examples of Russian book art.

Knebel is commemorated by a memorial plaque in Moscow and a museum exhibition in Buchach. His publishing legacy has been the subject of scholarly studies and exhibitions of his publications, and a number of the books and visual teaching aids issued by his firm have been republished, including in facsimile editions.

== Biography ==
Joseph Knebel was born in Buchach, Galicia, into a Jewish family. Little is known about his family. His father, Nikolai Knebel, was a merchant known for his domineering and quick-tempered nature. The family had three children. At the age of thirteen, following his bar mitzvah, Knebel left home after a conflict with his father and moved to Vienna, where, as Leonid Yuniverg suggests, he stayed with distant relatives.

As a teenager in Vienna, Knebel faced considerable hardship; according to the recollections of his daughter, Maria Knebel, he supported himself by selling newspapers and shining shoes. He passed the gymnasium examinations as an external candidate and enrolled in the philology faculty at the University of Vienna. During his studies, he developed an interest in books, languages, and the visual arts. His daughter later recalled that, by the end of his life, Knebel spoke fourteen languages. After graduating from the university in 1876, he entered the Vienna Academy of Commercial Sciences, graduating in 1878. He then spent two years studying bookselling and publishing practices in several European countries.

In 1880, Knebel moved to Russia and settled in Moscow. He initially worked at the Moscow branch of I. Deubner, a Riga-based bookselling and publishing firm specializing in foreign-language literature. He soon became the branch's manager. In late 1882, he and his friend and business partner Pavel Frantsevich Grossman, a Baltic German, established an independent bookselling business under the name Grossman and Knebel. The firm expanded into publishing in the mid-1890s.

Joseph Knebel died of a heart attack in Moscow on 14 August 1926. A notice of his death appeared the following day in the newspaper Izvestiya TsIK i VTsIK SSSR. He was buried at Vvedenskoye Cemetery in Moscow. At the request of the board of the Tretyakov Gallery, the State Publishing House, and several Soviet cultural figures, the People's Commissariat for Education granted his widow, Sofia Knebel, a personal pension for life. Those supporting the request included Igor Grabar, Vladimir Nevsky, Konstantin Stanislavski, Otto Schmidt, and Alexey Shchusev.

== Publishing and bookselling activities ==
Knebel's business combined bookselling with the publication of its own printed works. His firm produced popular science, art, educational, and children's publications, developed its own distribution network, and participated in book exhibitions in Russia and abroad.

=== Establishment and development of the firm ===
In November 1882, Knebel and his business partner opened the Grossman and Knebel bookshop in Moscow, in a building belonging to the Petrovsky Trading Lines Partnership apartment buildings. The shop specialized in fiction and publications on art in Russian and foreign languages, with German-language books and periodicals accounting for a significant portion of its stock. In 1885, a fee-based lending library for books and periodicals was established at the shop. Following Grossman's death from tuberculosis in 1890, Knebel became the firm's sole proprietor but retained its original name in memory of his friend and business partner. In 1894–1895, he entered the publishing business while continuing to sell books and periodicals. Among his earliest publications were works by Henrik Ibsen, Hermann Sudermann, and Grigory Machtet.

By the beginning of the 20th century, Grossman and Knebel had become one of the leading bookshops specializing in publications on the visual arts, children's books, and visual teaching aids. In addition to retail sales, the firm engaged in wholesale and consignment trade and distributed its own publications by mail order. It operated warehouse branches in Saint Petersburg, Kyiv, Warsaw, Vilna, Yekaterinodar, Yekaterinoslav, and Oryol. A representative office was later opened in Leipzig.

Knebel made extensive use of bibliographic catalogues to promote his firm's stock. Between 1883 and 1914, the firm published approximately 30 general and specialized catalogues, with print runs ranging from 3,000 to 65,000 copies. He also used advertisements in books and other promotional notices, arranged for new publications to be reviewed in major newspapers and trade journals, and printed bibliographic information on order forms, company envelopes, and the reverse sides of visual teaching aids. In the mid-1900s, a "School Museum" was established at his bookshop as a permanent exhibition of visual teaching aids, children's books, and art publications sold by the firm.

The bookselling side of the business employed about 15 people. Members of Knebel's family also worked at the shop at various times: his wife as a cashier, his elder daughter in accounting, and his younger daughter in the visual teaching aids department. The permanent publishing staff consisted of two or three employees, while editors, compilers, and translators were hired on a contract basis for individual publications.

In 1906, Knebel, a major shareholder in the A. A. Levenson Printing Partnership, began overseeing its publishing activities at the request of the company's management. The collaboration produced, among other works, an edition of Alexander Pushkin's The Song of the Wise Oleg, illustrated by Viktor Vasnetsov.

Between 1894 and 1918, Joseph Knebel's publishing house issued approximately 700 books, albums, brochures, printed illustrations, and visual teaching aids.

Joseph Knebel, co-founder of Grossman and Knebel (1880s)

Pavel Grossman, co-founder of Grossman and Knebel (1880s)

Index of Art Publications of Grossman and Knebel (1900)

Examples of advertisements for Grossman and Knebel (1900s)

Alexander Pushkin, The Song of the Wise Oleg (1915), cover illustrated by Viktor Vasnetsov

=== Popular science publications and visual teaching aids ===
In 1895, a group of young Moscow scholars approached Knebel with a proposal to publish their popular science works. He accepted, and between 1896 and 1900 published the series Questions of Science, Art, Literature and Life, comprising 23 booklets. Its contributors included Ivan Zabelin, Mikhail Menzbier, and Kliment Timiryazev.

From the late 1890s, Knebel expanded his publishing activities to include educational materials and visual teaching aids. Over the course of his career, he published more than 120 visual teaching aids.

Many of his visual teaching aids were issued in series, such as Cities of Russia, Pictures of Russian Geography, Tables of Metric Measures, and Scenes from Village Life in Russia. These consisted of large wall charts and pictures. To make them more durable, Knebel established a special workshop at his bookshop where they were mounted on cardboard, canvas, or so-called "leather paper". In addition to printed teaching aids, the firm sold microscopes, globes, herbaria, and papier-mâché models.

The best-known of Knebel's visual teaching aids was the series Pictures from Russian History (1908–1913), compiled by the educator and historian Sergey Knyazkov, who also wrote the explanatory texts. The series comprised 50 scenes from Russian history, illustrated by artists including Alexandre Benois, Ivan Bilibin, Apollinary Vasnetsov, Dmitry Kardovsky, Sergey Ivanov, Boris Kustodiev, Yevgeny Lanceray, Nicholas Roerich, and Valentin Serov. Between 1907 and 1910, Knebel also published the educational journals Visual Instruction and Natural Science and Visual Instruction.

These publications helped promote the wider use of visual teaching methods. By the late 1900s, Knebel had become one of Russia's leading publishers and booksellers of educational materials, alongside Ivan Sytin and Vladimir Dumnov. According to book historian Leonid Yuniverg, Knebel's finest visual teaching aids successfully combined the pedagogical talent of their authors, the experience of their editors and compilers, the artistic skills of their illustrators, and the craftsmanship of their printers, all brought together by the publisher's energy and professionalism. Yuniverg regarded many of these publications as among the greatest achievements of illustrated book publishing in pre-revolutionary Russia.

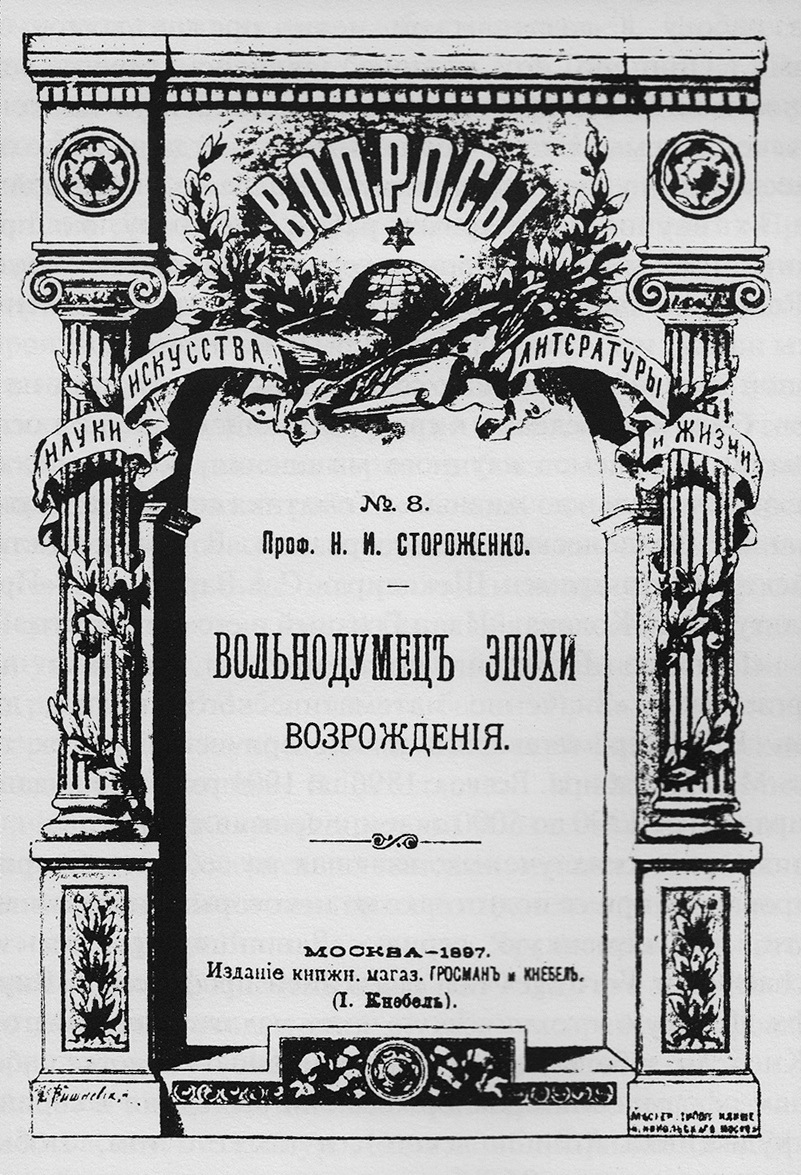
N. I. Storozhenko, A Freethinker of the Renaissance (1897), cover

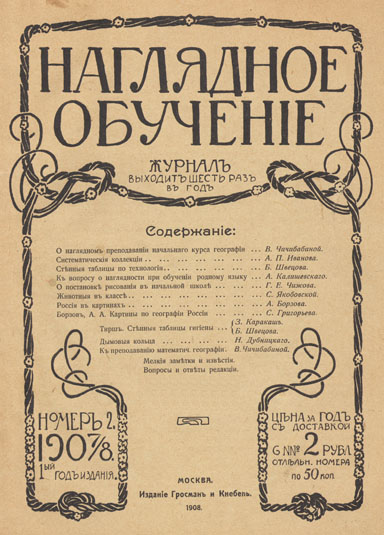
Visual Instruction, No. 2 (1907–1908), cover

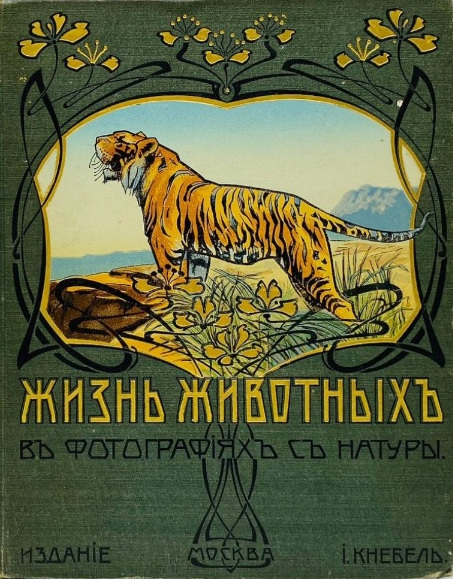
C. J. Cornish, Animal Life in Photographs from Nature (1909), binding

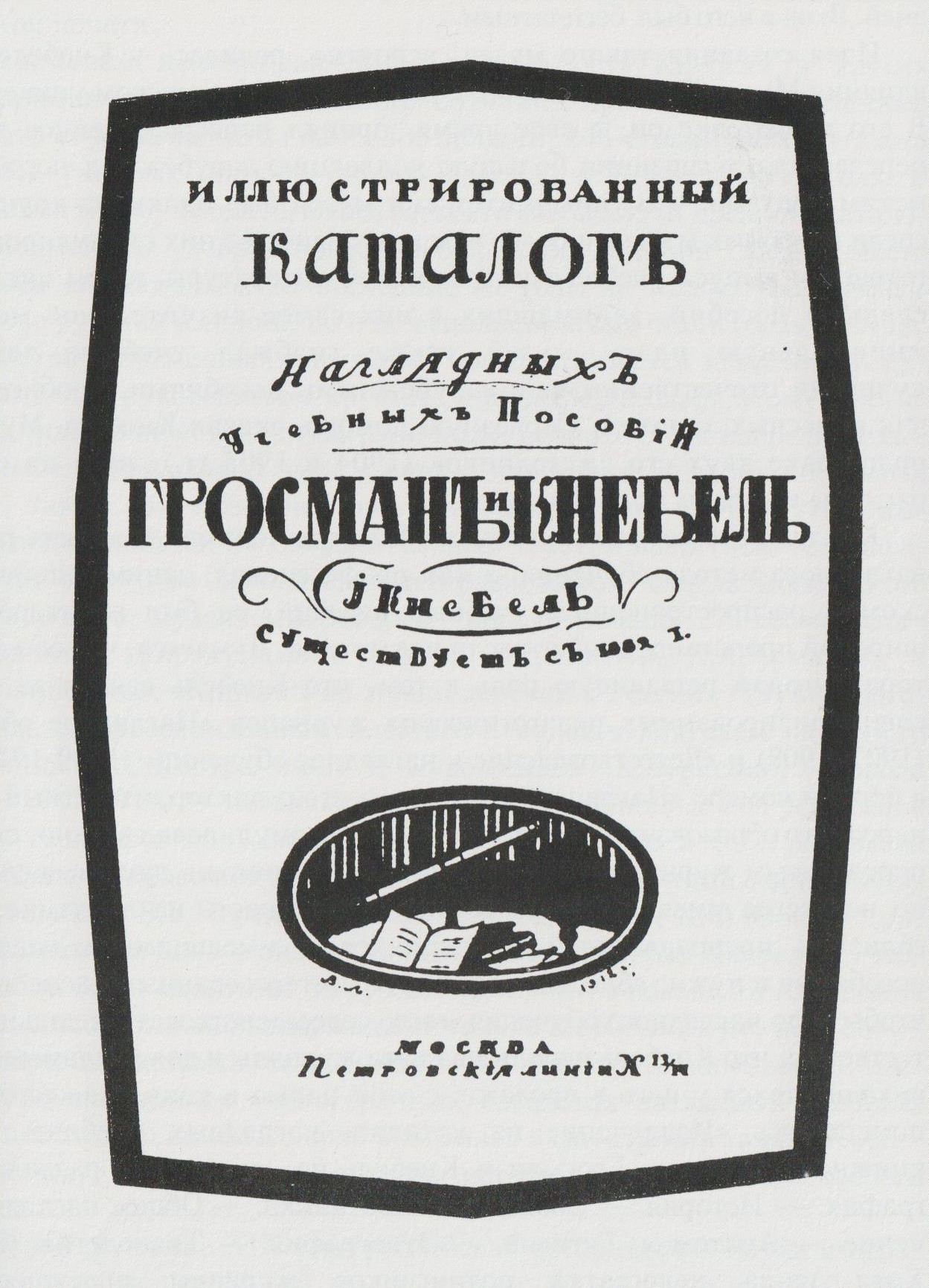
Illustrated Catalogue of Visual Teaching Aids (1912), cover

S. A. Knyazkov, Pictures from Russian History (1912), cover

=== Fine art publications ===
One of Knebel's principal achievements as a publisher was his production of books and albums on the visual arts. He recruited the artist and art historian Igor Grabar to oversee this area of his publishing programme. Knebel's largest publishing project was the multivolume History of Russian Art, edited by Grabar and published between 1910 and 1916. Its contributors included Ivan Bilibin, Apollinary Vasnetsov, Nikolai Wrangel, Ivan Fomin, Alexey Shchusev, and others. The original publication plan was never fully completed, as production was interrupted by World War I, the Russian Revolution, and the Russian Civil War.

Grabar also edited the illustrated monograph series Russian Artists, which included books on Valentin Serov, Mikhail Vrubel, Isaac Levitan, Andrei Ryabushkin, and Mikhail Nesterov. Although planned as an extensive series, it was discontinued after its first five volumes because of the war and revolutionary events. The series Russian Cities—Centres of Art was likewise discontinued after a single volume: Boris Eding's Rostov Veliky and Uglich, published in 1913.

Albums of reproductions of paintings from the collections of the Tretyakov Gallery, the Rumyantsev Museum, and the Russian Museum occupied a prominent place in Knebel's publishing programme. These publications were accompanied by texts written by Ilya Ostroukhov, Sergey Glagol, Nikolai Romanov, Alexandre Benois, and others. The reproductions were printed in Vienna using the photogravure process and distributed in separate installments.

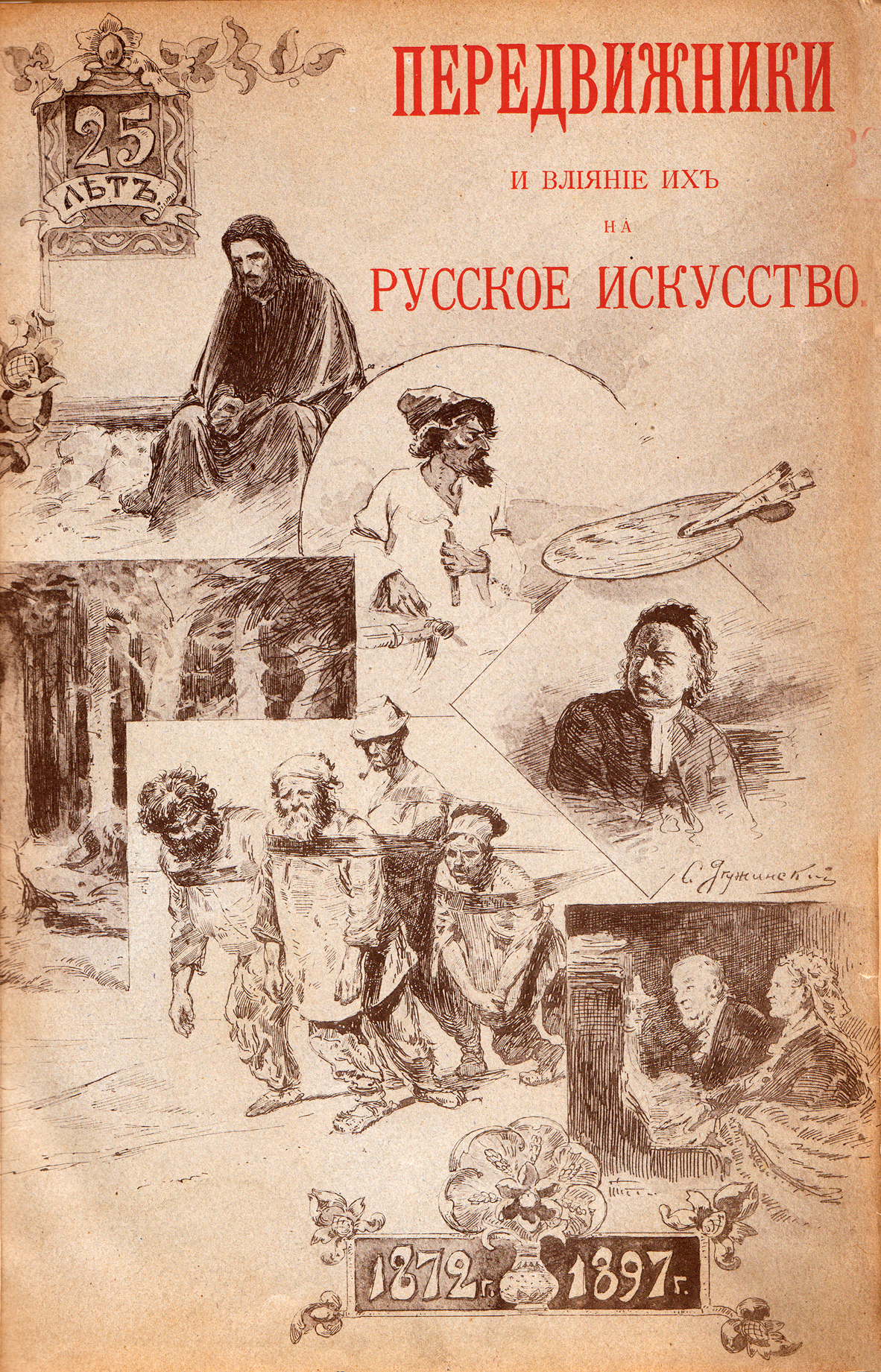
Alexey Novitsky, The Peredvizhniki and Their Influence on Russian Art (1897), cover (Note: The cover of one of the first books on Russian fine art published by Knebel. The publication commemorated the 25th anniversary of the Society for Travelling Art Exhibitions and was the first monograph devoted to its work.)

Alexandre Benois, Russian Museum of Emperor Alexander III (1906), binding

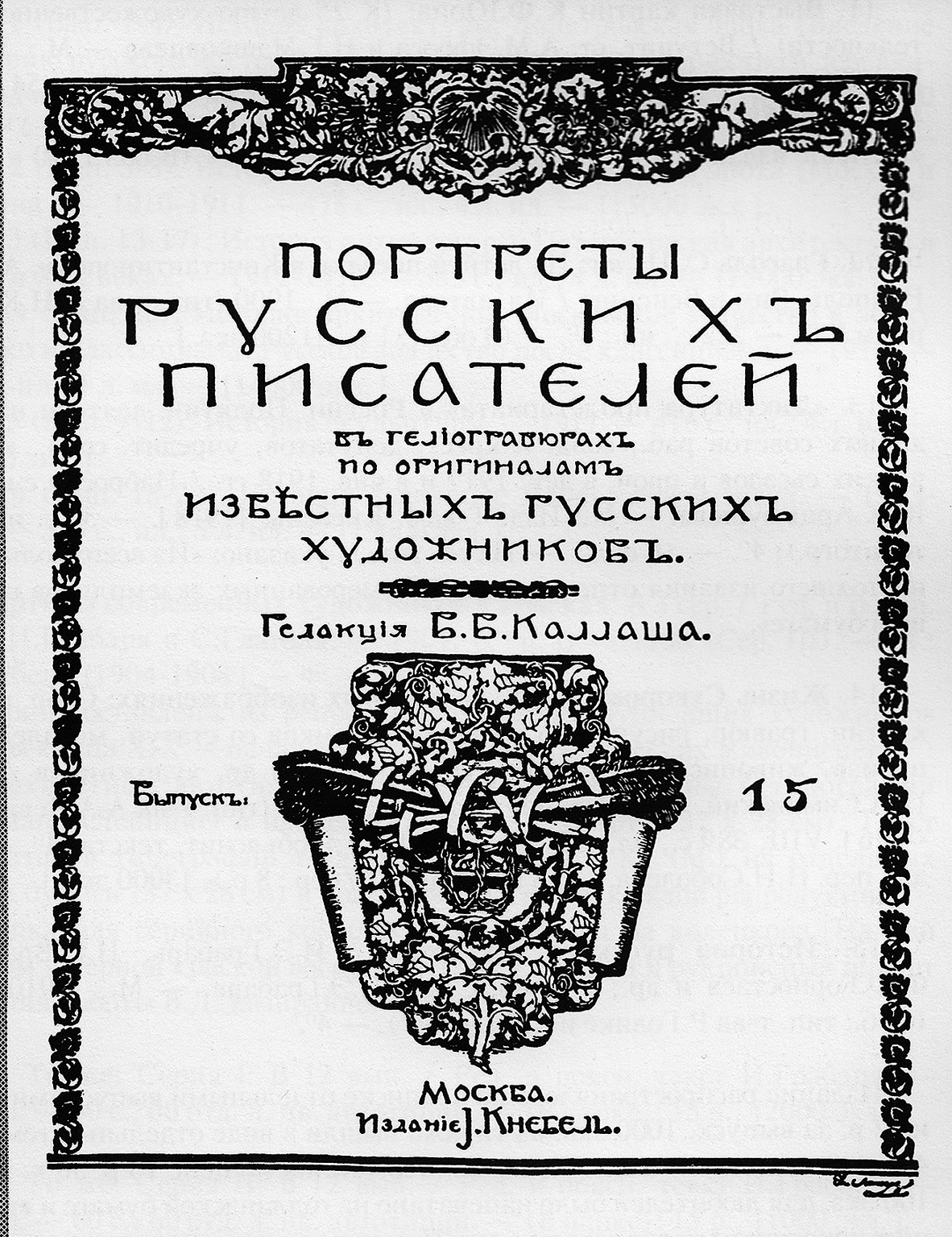
Portraits of Russian Writers (1909–1911), edited by Vladimir Kallash, issue 15

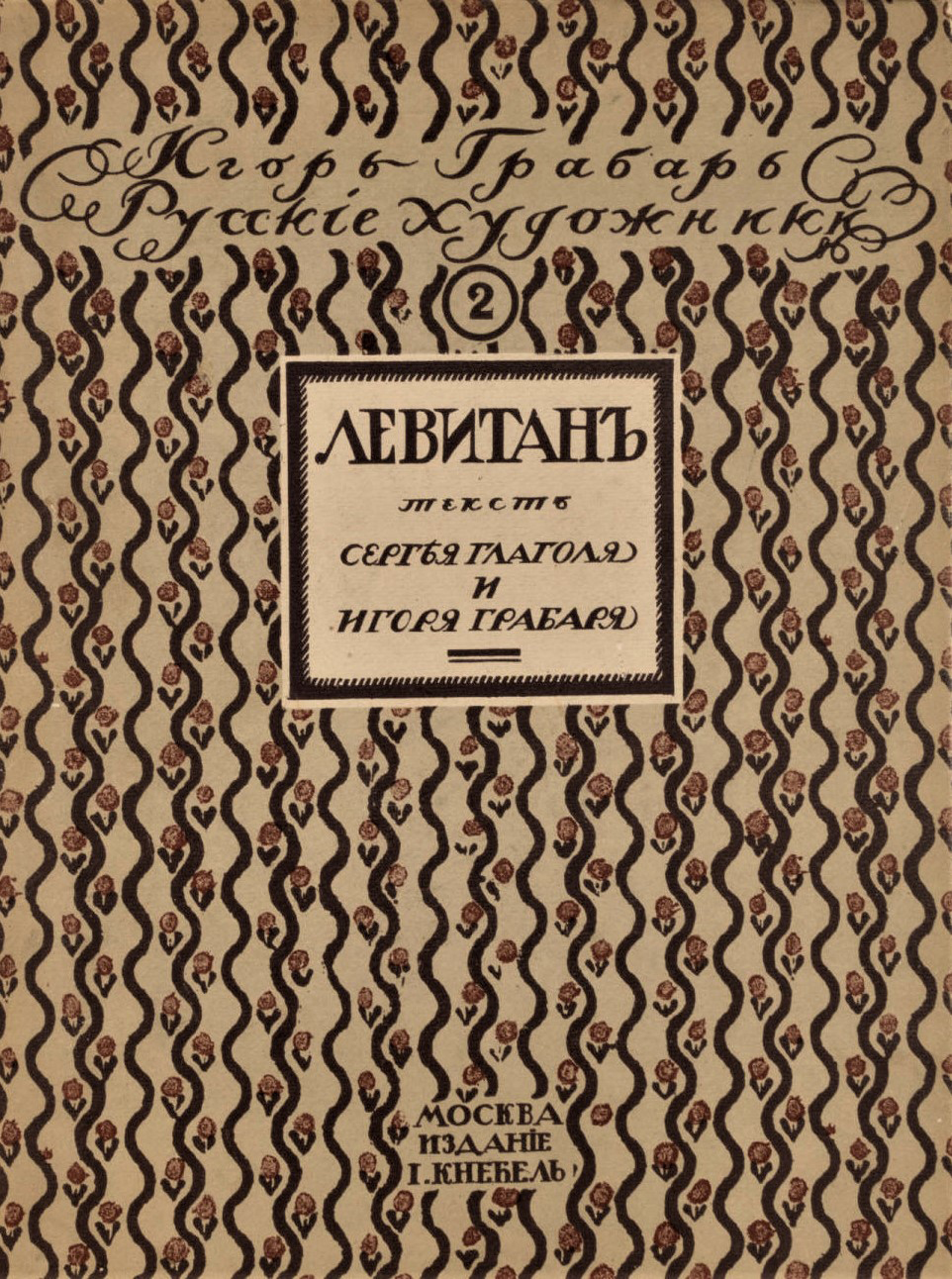
Sergey Glagol and Igor Grabar, Isaac Ilyich Levitan (1913), binding

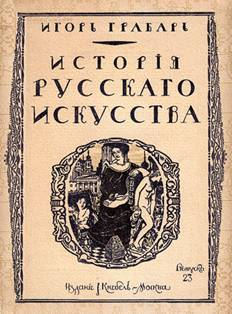
History of Russian Art (1910–1916), edited by Igor Grabar, issue 23, cover

=== Children's books ===
Knebel's books for young children, intended to introduce them to the world of fine art, became a significant phenomenon in the artistic life of pre-revolutionary Russia. The publisher believed that even if a child quickly forgot a book's text, its colours and illustrations would remain in their memory for a lifetime. Among the illustrators of Knebel's children's books were prominent Moscow and Saint Petersburg graphic artists associated with the Mir Iskusstva movement, including Dmitry Mitrokhin, Georgy Narbut, Elena Polenova, Nikolai Ulyanov, Mstislav Dobuzhinsky, and Aleksei Kravchenko. Knebel brought their illustrated books together in a "Gift Series", which was highly praised by contemporaries. While investing substantial sums in these artistically produced editions, he also published a large number of children's books with simpler, more conventional designs typical of the period. In total, Knebel published approximately 400 editions for younger and middle-grade children.

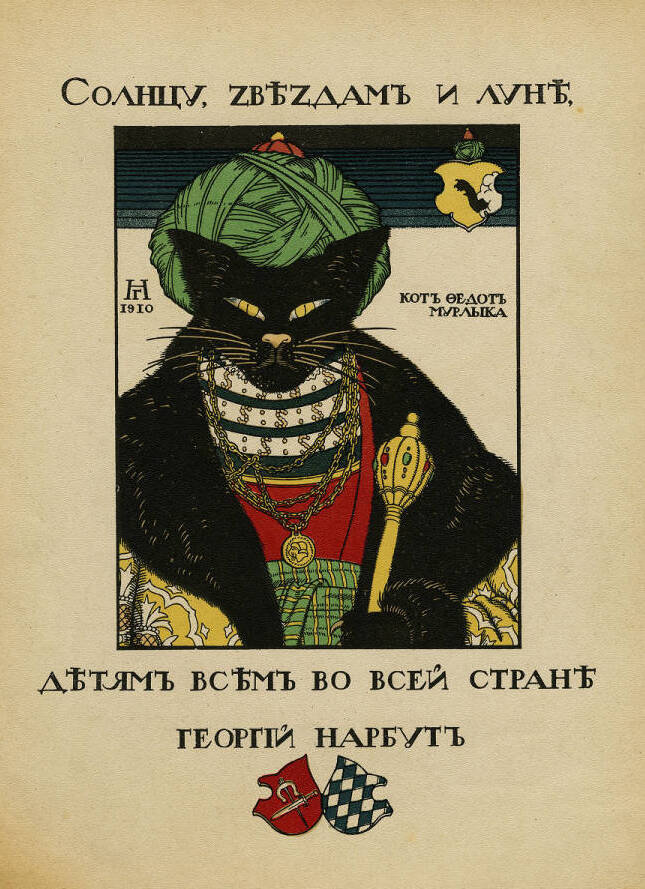
Vasily Zhukovsky, How the Mice Buried the Cat (1910), frontispiece illustrated by Georgy Narbut

Hans Christian Andersen, The Nightingale (1912), cover illustrated by Georgy Narbut

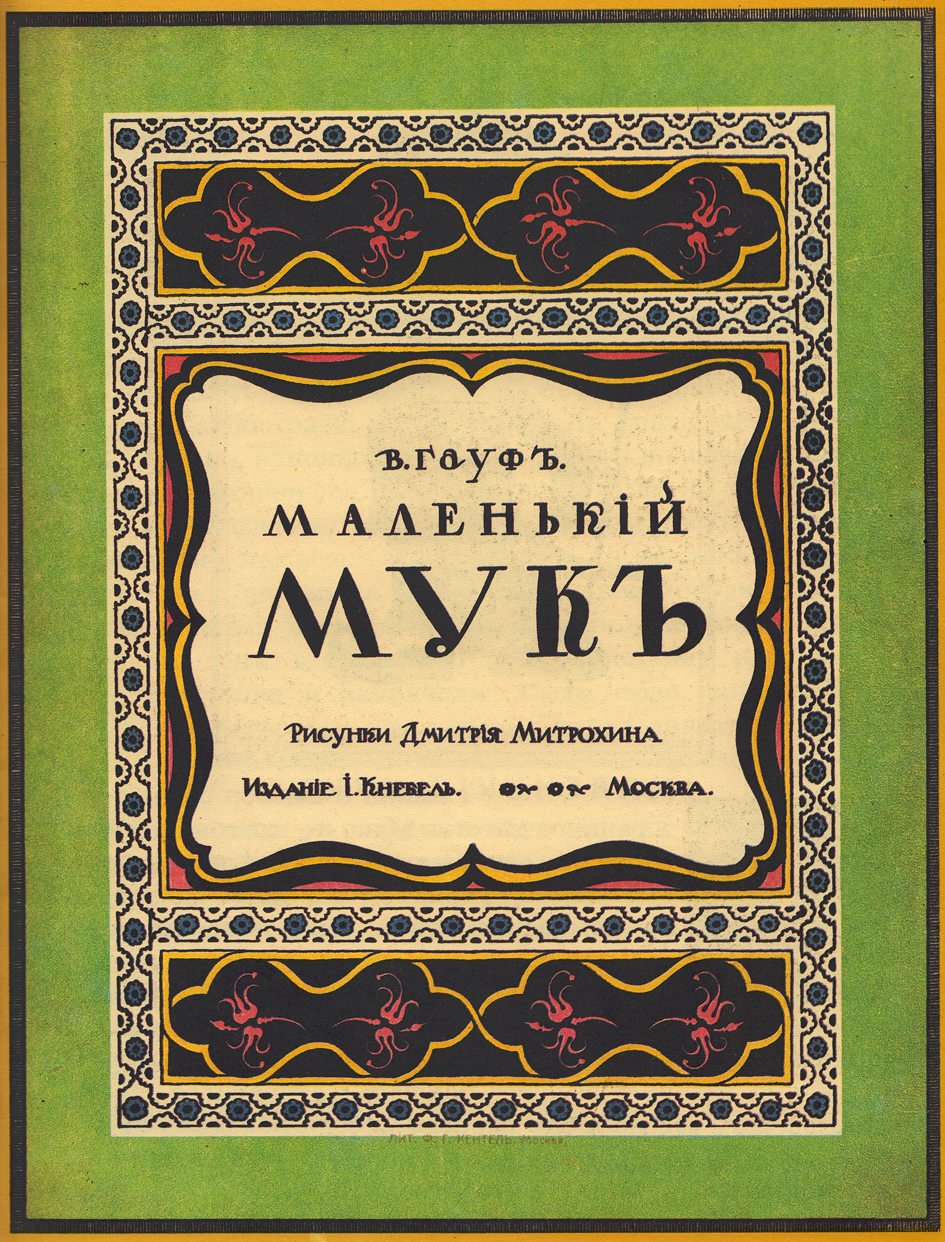
Wilhelm Hauff, Little Muck (1913), cover illustrated by Dmitry Mitrokhin

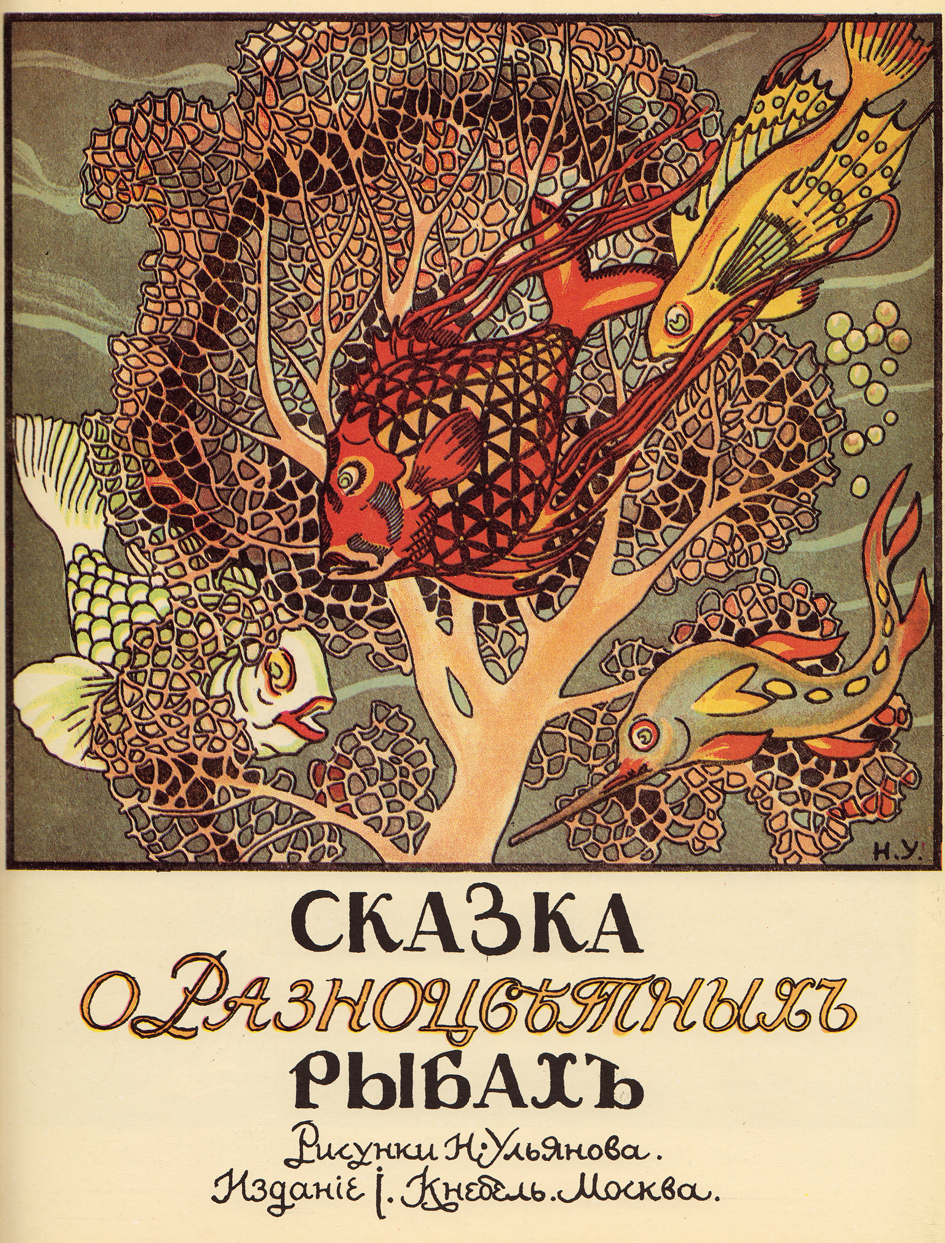
The Tale of the Multicoloured Fish (1914), cover illustrated by Nikolai Ulyanov

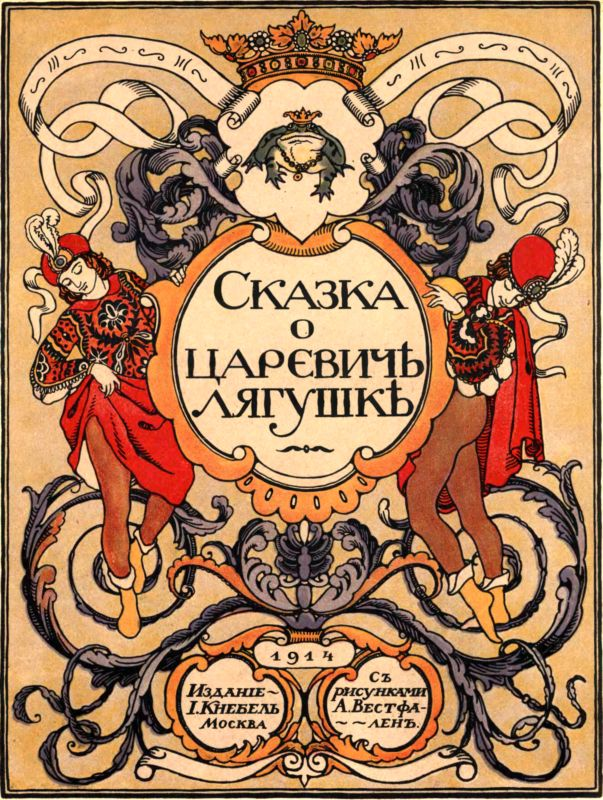
The Tale of the Frog Tsarevich (1914), cover illustrated by A. Kh. Westphalen

=== Guidebooks ===
The publication of guidebooks became another important area of Knebel's activities. In collaboration with the A. A. Levenson Printing Partnership, he published Western Europe: A Tourist's Companion (1900), a detailed 600-page guidebook modelled on the internationally renowned travel guides issued by Baedeker. Edited by Sergey Filippov, it was reprinted six times and contained information on 800 cities, towns, and resorts, along with maps, plans, and tables.

Knebel subsequently published two specialized series. The first, Cosmopolitan (1902–1912), comprised six booklets, including The Russian in England, The Russian in Italy, and The Russian in Finland. Its principal author was the writer and journalist Lev Zhdanov. The second series, Guidebooks to Western Europe (1911–1912), included separate volumes on Germany, France, and Belgium. These were compiled by the professional guidebook writer Alexey Nenashev, drawing on his personal observations, information from acquaintances, and Russian and foreign publications.

The Russian in France and Belgium, compiled by Lev Zhdanov (1908), cover

A. P. Nenashev, Germany (1911), cover

Western Europe: A Tourist's Companion, edited by Sergey Filippov (1912), title page

A. P. Nenashev, France (1912), cover

A. P. Nenashev, Switzerland (1913), cover

=== Participation in exhibitions ===
Beginning in the 1900s, Knebel participated in most Russian and international book exhibitions. His publications were displayed annually at exhibitions organized by Russia's Main Directorate for Press Affairs. He also frequently presented his publications at exhibitions of visual teaching aids held at Moscow University, the Teachers' Institute, and the Agricultural Academy, as well as at regional teachers' conferences. Knebel's fine art publications and children's books were featured at the major exhibition Art in Books and Posters (1911–1912), held in the Russian capital.

At international book exhibitions in Brussels and Milan, Knebel's visual teaching aids received the highest awards and were recommended by jury members as exemplary educational materials. In 1914, his publications were also displayed at the International Exhibition of Printing and Graphic Arts in Leipzig. In the Russian section of the exhibition, entitled "The Modern Illustrated Book", 31 of the 214 publications on display had been issued by Knebel. The section "Drawings for the Modern Book" featured 11 original illustrations by Georgy Narbut and Dmitry Mitrokhin for four children's books published by his firm.

Poster for the International Exhibition of Printing and Graphic Arts in Leipzig (1914)

Catalogue of the Russian section of the Leipzig exhibition (1914)

Illustration by Georgy Narbut from Krylov's Fables (1912)

Illustration by Dmitry Mitrokhin from Wilhelm Hauff's Little Muck (1913)

Illustration by Dmitry Mitrokhin from Wilhelm Hauff's The Story of Almanzor (1912)

=== Anti-German pogrom and reorganization of the firm ===
Excerpt from Knebel's statement of losses (1916)

During the anti-German pogrom in Moscow on 28 May 1915, Knebel's bookshop, publishing house, and warehouse suffered severe damage. According to his own estimates, the losses exceeded 500,000 rubles. He considered the destruction of original paintings, illustrations, and manuscripts the most serious and irreparable loss.

Knebel sought financial assistance from various government agencies. His appeals received support from the Imperial Academy of Arts in Saint Petersburg, the Moscow Commercial Institute, the editorial boards of the journals Starye Gody and Apollon, and several prominent figures in Russian science and culture.

It was not until February 1917 that the Moscow Special Committee for Assessing Losses Caused by the Disturbances in Moscow and Its Environs on 27–29 May 1915 partially approved Knebel's claim for compensation, deciding to reimburse approximately 40% of the amount he had claimed.

Faced with a shortage of funds and seeking to restore his publishing operations to their former scale, Knebel reorganized his firm in early 1917 as a joint-stock company, the "I. Knebel Publishing and Printing Partnership in Moscow". He retained 80% of the shares, while his close associate Vladimir Altshuler and the art historian Bernhardt Buchheim became co-founders.

=== Early years of Soviet rule ===
In 1918, Joseph Knebel was invited to the Council of People's Commissars to meet Vladimir Lenin, who instructed him to organize the nationalization of his company. Its stock of books and visual teaching aids was transferred to the People's Commissariat for Education, while its printing and lithographic works were transferred to the Printing Department of the Moscow Council of National Economy. In 1918, probably shortly before the nationalization, Knebel published The Dictatorship of the Proletariat, an album of sketches of revolutionary leaders by Yury Artsybushev. According to Yuniverg, the drawings reflected the artist's hostile attitude towards Lenin.

Between 1919 and 1926, Knebel collaborated with Soviet cultural and educational institutions, including Gosizdat, the publishing house of the People's Commissariat for Posts and Telegraphs of the USSR, and the People's Commissariat for Education. In 1920, the Soviet authorities invited him to manage the printing and lithographic works that had formerly belonged to him. In 1923, he helped establish the joint-stock company "Visual Aids". In 1925–1926, he established and headed the publishing department of the Tretyakov Gallery.

Yury Artsybushev, The Dictatorship of the Proletariat in Russia (1918), title page

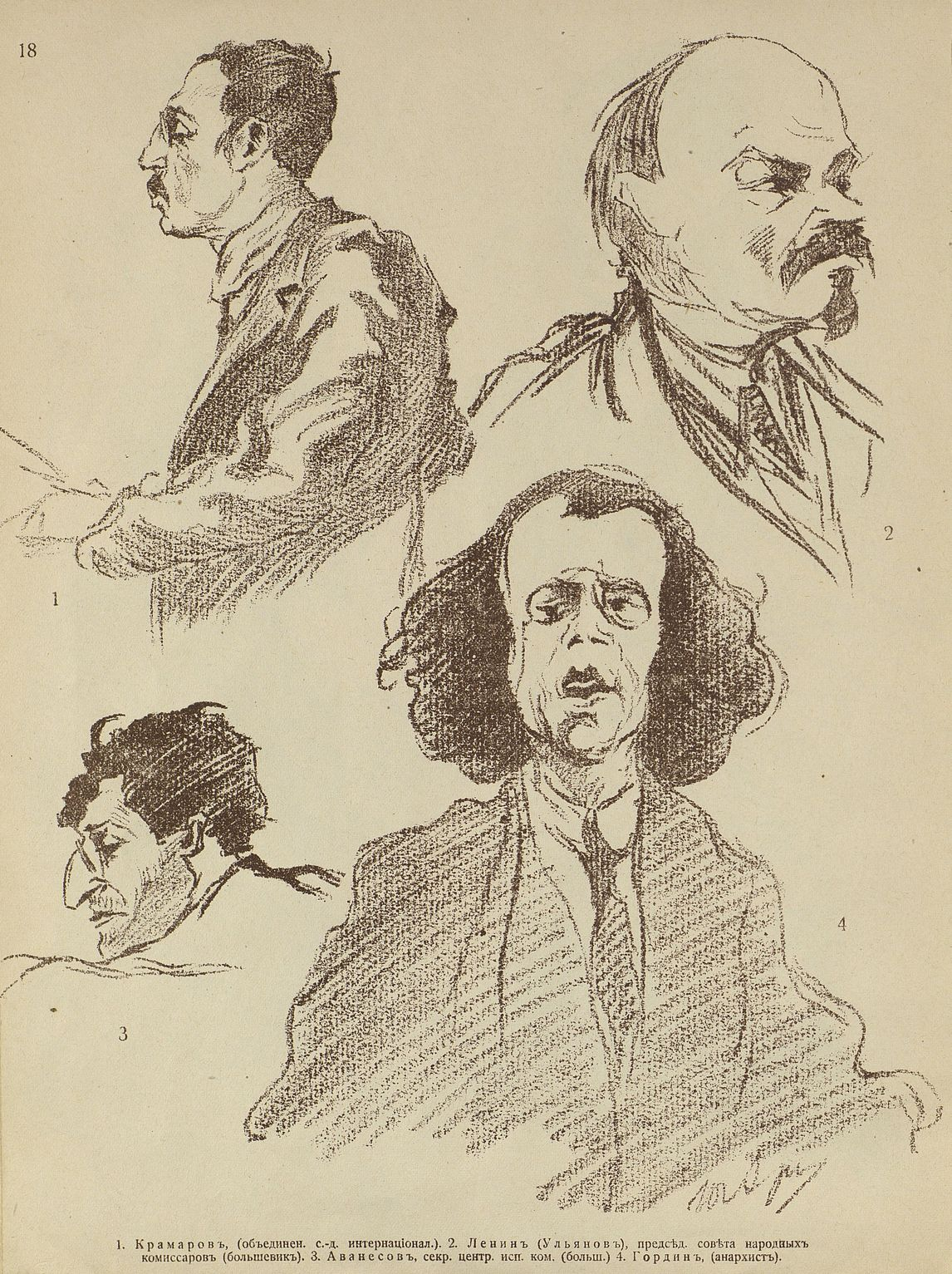
Yury Artsybushev, The Dictatorship of the Proletariat in Russia (1918), illustration

A. V. Mikhailovsky, Fedenka (1924), cover illustrated by V. S. Vermel

Joseph Knebel with staff members of the Tretyakov Gallery (1925)

At the Origins of Russian Painting, exhibition catalogue of the Tretyakov Gallery (1925)

== Public activities ==
Bulletin of the Literary and Artistic Circle (1915)

Knebel was a member of the Moscow Society of Booksellers, founded in 1901, and one of the principal shareholders in its journal, Booksellers' Herald. He also played a significant role in the All-Russian Society of Booksellers, established in 1911. In 1913, at the suggestion of the society's members, he joined the Moscow Organizing Committee responsible for convening a congress of publishers and booksellers in Kyiv. He subsequently represented the committee's Provisional Bureau in Moscow alongside Ivan Sytin.

From 1888, Knebel was an "amateur member" of the Moscow Society of Art Lovers and participated in its principal activities until 1912. In 1901, he became a "contributing member" of the Moscow Literary and Artistic Circle, an association of writers, artists, actors, and other cultural figures. Initially, he had no voting rights, but in 1907 he was admitted as a full member. Knebel also helped develop the circle's library, donating publications issued by his firm.

Knebel also supported artistic and cultural initiatives in Moscow. In 1896, he contributed several rare publications to an exhibition commemorating Dmitry Rovinsky. In 1899, he supplied materials for an exhibition marking the centenary of Alexander Pushkin's birth, including watercolours by Vardges Sureniants created for an edition of The Fountain of Bakhchisaray, as well as copies of the book itself.

== Family ==
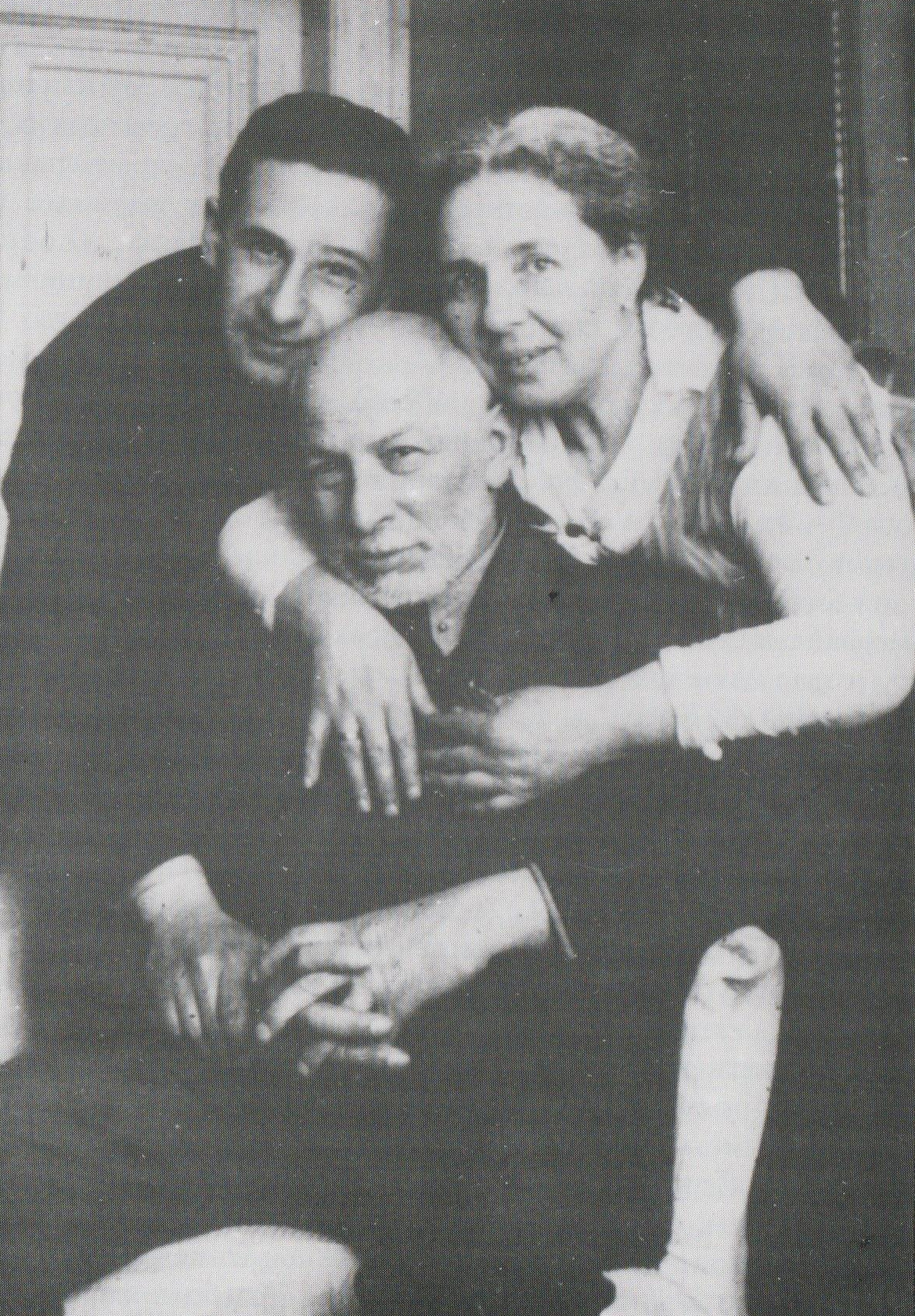
Knebel with his wife and son in the 1920s

Knebel's wife, Sofia Markovna Knebel (née Brenner; 1870–1942), came from a Moscow Jewish family that had converted to Lutheranism. Her father died in a fire at a factory owned by the family, and she helped raise her younger siblings. She met Knebel in 1892, and he proposed marriage within the first year of their acquaintance, but she initially refused. Three years later, she agreed to marry him on the condition that he also convert to Lutheranism. Knebel regarded the conversion as a necessary formality.

The couple had three children. Their elder daughter, Elena Osipovna Knebel (1896–1980), worked for Soviet publishing houses. Their younger daughter, Maria Osipovna Knebel (1898–1985), became an actress, theatre director, drama teacher, Doctor of Art Studies, and People's Artist of the RSFSR. Her memoir An Entire Life includes recollections of her father. Their son, Nikolai Osipovich Knebel (1900–1946), worked as a graphic designer and art editor for several Moscow publishing houses. He was wrongfully arrested in 1940 during the Stalinist repressions and rehabilitated in 1943. Soon afterwards, he joined the Iskusstvo publishing house. He died while on a work assignment in Germany.

== Assessments ==
The academician Alexey Shchusev praised Knebel's contribution to the popularization of art and scientific publications, describing him as an outstanding figure in the field. The art historian and artist Igor Grabar regarded Knebel as an exceptional publisher who was not motivated solely by commercial interests and often acted against them in pursuit of an ideal, particularly in the popularization of art. The art historian and artist Alexandre Benois considered Knebel the most energetic, consistent, and capable of undertaking comprehensive projects among the publishers he knew. He particularly praised Knebel's series of children's books. The scientist and historian of science Kliment Timiryazev commended Knebel's skilful and tireless efforts to advance school education in Russia.

The art historian Alla Rosenfeld praised the high quality of the printing and illustrations in Knebel's children's books. In her assessment, he was the first Russian publisher to recognize the particular importance of artistic book design for young children and to enlist the leading graphic artists of his time for this purpose. According to the art historian and professor at the Moscow Polygraphic Institute Yefim Adamov, the traditions established by Knebel proved fruitful, while his publication series and formats laid the foundations for modern books. Dutch scholars of book art Albert Lemmens and Serge-Aljosja Stommels noted that the publications of Knebel's "Gift Series" served as models for later Soviet children's books. The literary and art historian Ilya Zilberstein emphasized Knebel's major contribution to the promotion of Russian artistic culture, regarding his publications as masterpieces of Russian book art. The literary scholar Irakly Andronikov described Knebel as a major figure in his roles as publisher, editor, initiator, and promoter of Russian art. However, the art historian Erast Kuznetsov, while acknowledging the deserved reputation of Knebel's books illustrated by leading artists, contrasted them with the majority of his children's publications, which he considered far below the same artistic standard.

Since the late 1980s, original editions of Knebel's fine art publications and children's books, particularly those from the "Gift Series", have increased in value on the antiquarian book market.

== Legacy ==
Knebel's legacy has been studied by scholars of publishing and book history. In 1982, Leonid Yuniverg defended his Candidate of Sciences dissertation, The Publishing and Bookselling Activities of I. N. Knebel, at the Moscow Polygraphic Institute. In 1997, he published the monograph The Publishing World of Joseph Knebel.

=== Exhibitions and memorials ===
Memorial plaque commemorating Joseph Knebel (1980)

Two exhibitions of Knebel's publications were held in Moscow. The first, marking the 120th anniversary of his birth, took place from December 1974 to January 1975 at the House of Children's Books of the Detskaya Literatura publishing house. The second, commemorating the 125th anniversary of his birth, was held in January–February 1980 at the premises of his former bookshop in Petrovsky Lines. Both exhibitions were accompanied by catalogues. On 14 January 1980, a memorial plaque dedicated to Knebel, designed by architect Yuri Nikolayevich Voskresensky, was unveiled inside his former bookshop. In 2023, the plaque was moved to the building's façade. In the early 1980s, an exhibition devoted to Knebel was established at the local history museum in Buchach, his birthplace.

=== Posthumous reprints ===
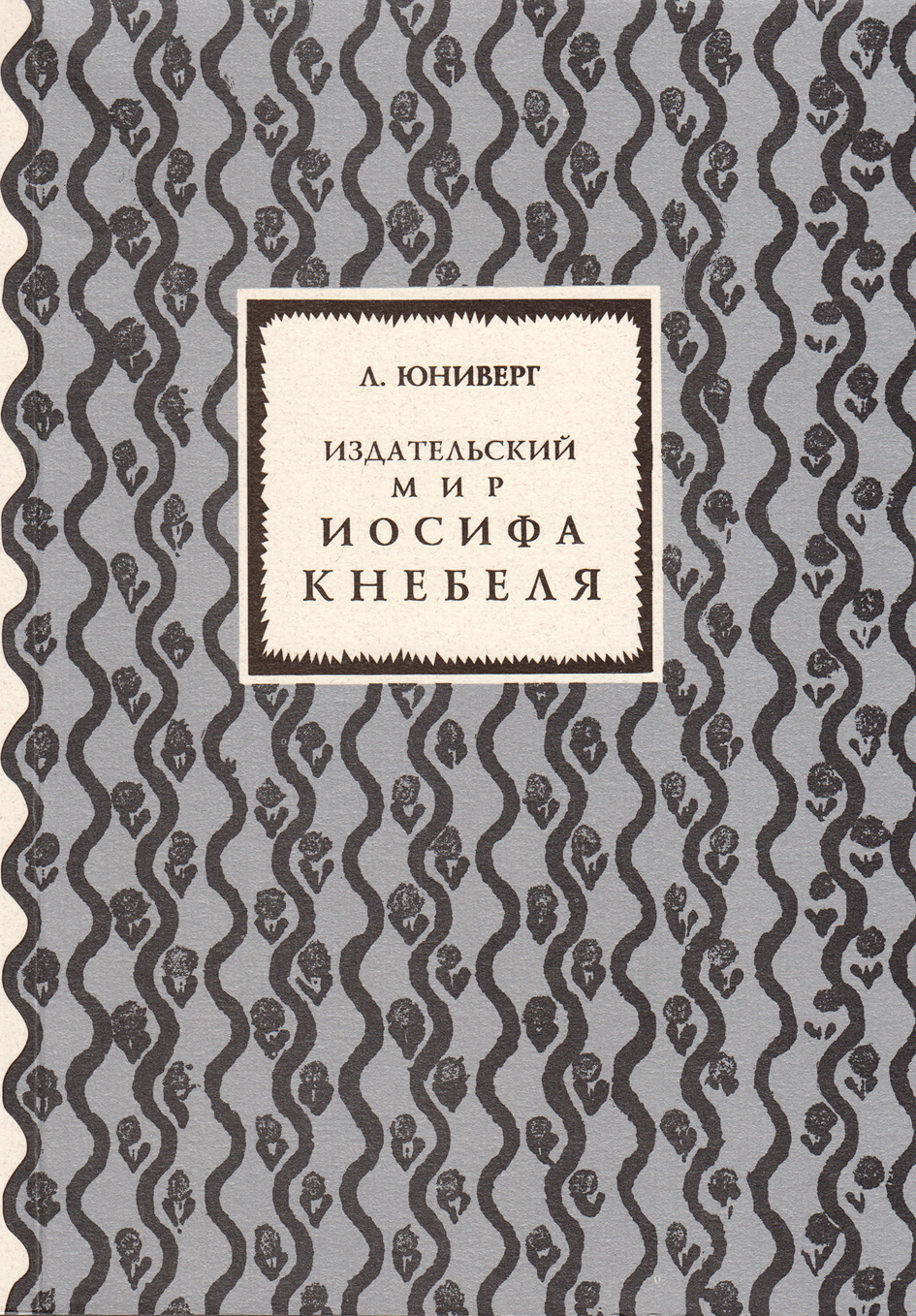
Leonid Yuniverg, The Publishing World of Joseph Knebel (1997), cover

In the 1980s, after a 60-year hiatus, Knebel's children's books began to be republished. Between 1980 and 1982, the Khudozhnik RSFSR publishing house issued reprints of three fairy-tale books originally published by Knebel, as part of its series Artists for Children: From the History of Children's Books. In 1989, the Kniga publishing house reproduced another 12 of Knebel's children's books in facsimile, collected under the title Children's Books of the I. N. Knebel Publishing House. That same year, the Izobrazitelnoye Iskusstvo publishing house issued a set of double-sized postcards entitled Pictures from Russian History: From the I. N. Knebel Edition, 1908–1913. During the 1990s, the magazine Yuny Khudozhnik (Young Artist) used reproductions from this series as monthly supplements, accompanied by excerpts from Sergey Knyazkov's original explanatory texts published by Knebel.

In 2010, the Fortuna EL publishing house released Fairy Tales and Fables Illustrated by Georgy Narbut as part of its Book Collection series. The volume included reproductions of works originally published by Knebel. Three years later, the same publisher released Fairy Tales and Stories Illustrated by Dmitry Mitrokhin in the same series, featuring reduced-size reproductions of nine more of Knebel's children's books. In 2016, the Knigi WAM publishing house, in collaboration with the Design Laboratory of HSE University, published Fairy Tales: Book Masterpieces of the I. Knebel Publishing House, commissioned by Interros. The collection brought together 15 books from Knebel's "Gift Series".

== Bibliography ==
- Chapkina, M. Ya. (2013), "Митрохин иллюстрирует книги для детей" [Mitrokhin Illustrates Children's Books], Сказки и повести в иллюстрациях Дмитрия Митрохина [Fairy Tales and Stories Illustrated by Dmitry Mitrokhin] (in Russian), Fortuna EL, pp. 119–123
- Dorofeeva, L. P. (2010), "Книжное искусство Георгия Нарбута" [The Book Art of Georgy Narbut], Сказки и басни в иллюстрациях Георгия Нарбута [Fairy Tales and Fables Illustrated by Georgy Narbut] (in Russian), Moscow: Fortuna EL, pp. 113–124, ISBN 978-5-9582-0037-5
- Ekshtut, Semyon A. [in Russian] (8 September 2015), "Пётр настоящий" [The Real Peter], Rodina (in Russian)
- Knebel, Maria O. (2021), Вся жизнь: учебное пособие для СПО [An Entire Life: A Textbook for Secondary Vocational Education] (in Russian), Saint Petersburg: Lan; Planeta Muzyki, ISBN 978-5-8114-6130-1; ISBN 978-5-4495-0930-7
- Kuznetsov, Erast D. [in Russian] (1963), "Оформление детской книги предреволюционных лет (1901—1917)" [Children's Book Design in Pre-Revolutionary Russia (1901–1917)], Книга. Исследования и материалы (in Russian) (8), Moscow
- Lemmens, Albert; Stommels, Serge-Aljosja [in Russian] (2009), Russian Artists and the Children's Book 1890–1992, Nijmegen: LS, ISBN 978-90-79393-05-3
- Rosenfeld, Alla (2014), "Between East and West: The Search for National Identity in Russian Illustrated Children's Books, 1800–1917", in Blakesley, Rosalind P.; Samu, Margaret (eds.), From Realism to the Silver Age: New Studies in Russian Artistic Culture, DeKalb, Illinois: Northern Illinois University Press, pp. 168–188, ISBN 978-0-87580-703-4
- Vlasov, Viktor G. [in Russian] (1996), "Кнебель Иосиф Николаевич" [Joseph Nikolaevich Knebel], Стили в искусстве: Архитектура, графика. Декоративно-прикладное искусство. Живопись, скульптура: словарь: в 3 т. [Styles in Art: Architecture and Graphic Arts, Decorative and Applied Arts, Painting and Sculpture: A Dictionary in Three Volumes] (in Russian), vol. 2: Словарь имён: А—Л (Dictionary of Names: A–L), Saint Petersburg: Kolna, p. 424, ISBN 5-88737-005-X, OCLC 605179863
- Yuniverg, Leonid I. (1997), Издательский мир Иосифа Кнебеля [The Publishing World of Joseph Knebel] (in Russian), Jerusalem: Philobiblon, ISBN 965-222-809-5
- Yuniverg, Leonid I. [in Russian] (2009), "Кнебель Иосиф (Осип) Николаевич" [Knebel, Joseph (Osip) Nikolaevich], Большая российская энциклопедия [Great Russian Encyclopedia] (in Russian), vol. 14, Moscow: Great Russian Encyclopedia, p. 331, ISBN 978-5-85270-345-3, archived from the original on 22 February 2023
- Yuniverg, Leonid I. (2016), "Иосиф Кнебель — выдающийся издатель Серебряного века" [Joseph Knebel: An Outstanding Publisher of the Silver Age], В книжных садах: Статьи о книгах и журналах, издателях и коллекционерах [In the Gardens of Books: Essays on Books and Magazines, Publishers and Collectors] (in Russian), Jerusalem: Philobiblon, pp. 132–151
- Yuniverg, Leonid I. [in Russian] (2018), "«Диктатура пролетариата» Юрия Ацыбушева в издании И. Н. Кнебеля: к 100-летию со времени выхода" [Yury Artsybushev's "Dictatorship of the Proletariat" Published by I. N. Knebel: On the 100th Anniversary of Its Publication], Про книги: Журнал библиофила (in Russian) (4 (48)): 59–68
- Yuniverg, Leonid I. (2025), "Неожиданная, но заслуженная метаморфоза" [An Unexpected but Well-Deserved Transformation], in E. Yu. Korablyova (ed.), Библиофилы России: Альманах [Bibliophiles of Russia: An Almanac] (in Russian), vol. 20, Moscow: Lyubimaya Rossiya, pp. 447–456
