= Billy Novik =

Russian musician

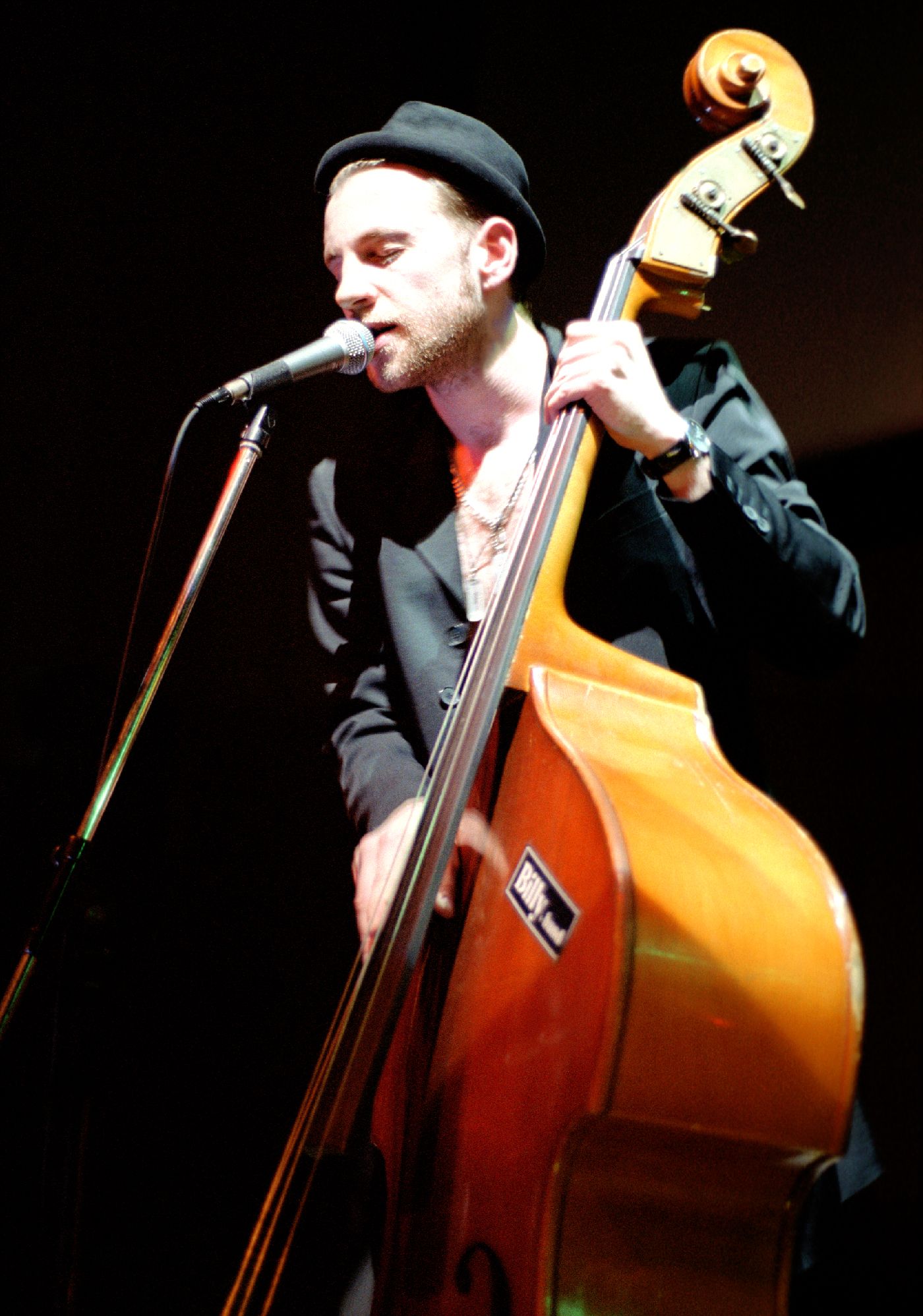
- Billy Novik, 2004

Background information
- Born: Vadim Valeryevich Novik; October 30, 1975 (age 50); Leningrad, Russian SFSR, Soviet Union
- Origin: Soviet Union → Russia
- Genres: rock, jazz, blues
- Occupations: singer, double bassist
- Label: Billy's Band

Billy Novik (born Vadim Valeryevich Novik, Russian: Вадим Валерьевич Новик; October 30, 1975) is a St. Petersburg-based musician, one of the Billy's Band founders, and the author of the music and lyrics for most of this group's songs. He plays double bass, piano, drums, harmonica, banjo, bass guitar, and guitar.

The well-known American singer and actor Tom Waits made a significant influence on the Billy's music and performs, as well as on his stage image of a kind of loser in a secondhand "pork pie" hat, with his raspy vocals and a mixture of singing and spoken word.

== Biography ==
Vadim Novik was born in 1975 in Leningrad. He spent the childhood in the Kupchino district: until the age of six he lived on Belgradskaya Street, then moved to Dimitrova Street. From the first till the third grade, Novik attended School No. 219; his mother then transferred him to School No. 310. He received his diploma from School No. 230, where he studied in a class with a medical focus.

He began singing and playing drums in his band Reanimatsiya in the 1980s, while still a schoolboy. In the early 1990s he was the lead guitarist of the band Oskolki. In 1998, he graduated from the Saint Petersburg State Pediatric Medical Academy. He then worked for three years at Children's Hospital No. 5 as a forensic pathologist, and for some time as a senior laboratory assistant in the Department of Military Field Surgery in the research group on wound ballistics and explosive injury factors at the Kirov Military Medical Academy.

In 1999, Vadim Novik began working at the non-commercial Saint Petersburg club "Boom Brothers", located in the basement of a multi-storey building at No. 1 Bolsheokhtinsky Avenue. The venue's art director was the young guitarist Andrei "Ryzhik" Reznikov. Around the same time, Novik first discovered the work of Tom Waits — he tried singing Waits's songs and found that his interpretations were well received by audiences. On October 3, 1999, "Boom Brothers" hosted a "Cowboy Music Evening," during which the group —consisting of Novik and Reznikov— performed several Tom Waits' songs, along with some country music, surf rock, and English folk songs such as My Bonnie (Lies Over The Ocean).

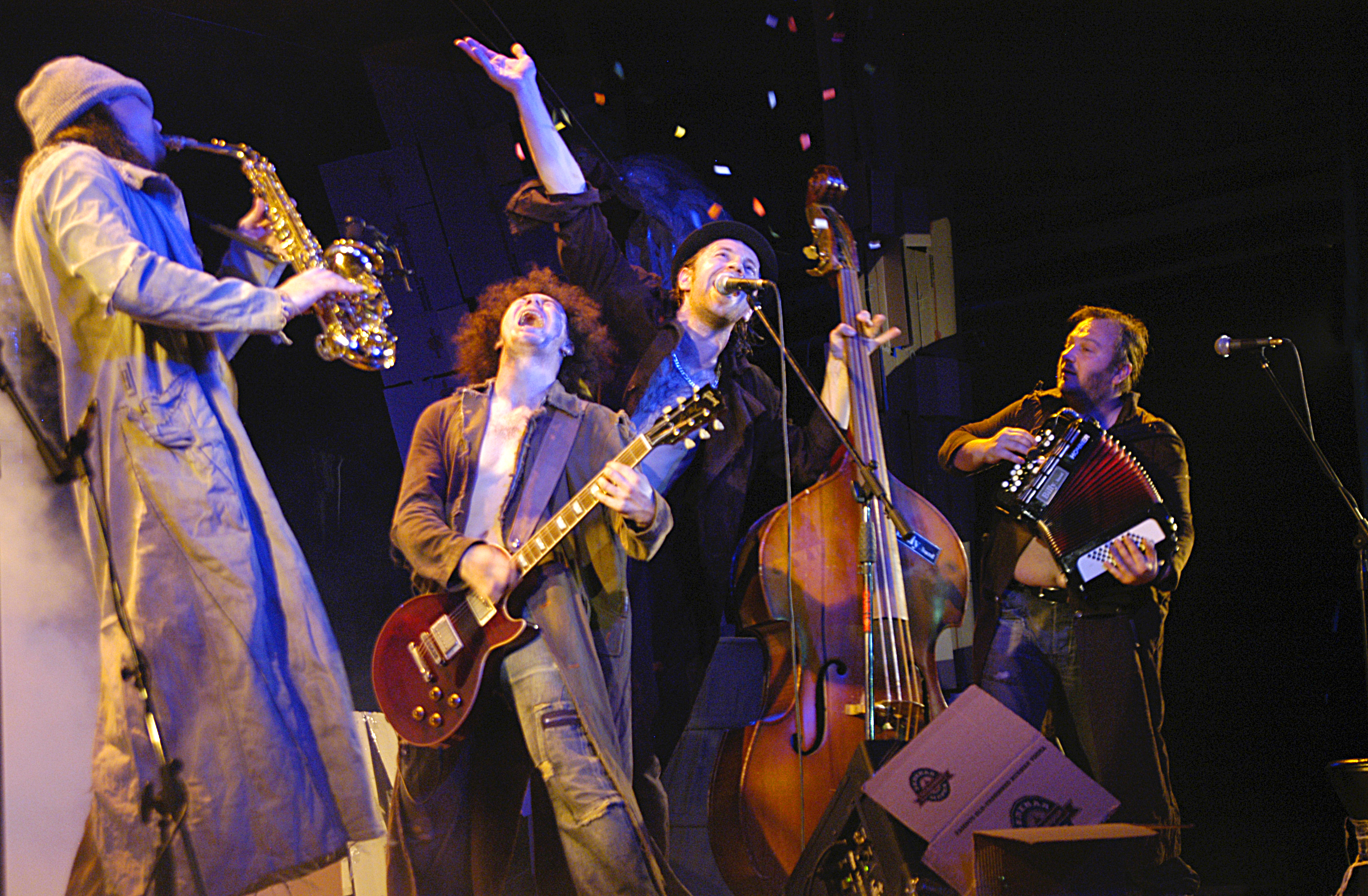
Billy's Band (2006)

The new musical group was named Billy's Dilly's Band — after one of the characters in the ballad Stagger Lee. In the following period, they occasionally played a wide variety of music at "Boom" — from Red Hot Chili Peppers to retro material from the films of Quentin Tarantino. In 2001, Billy Novik left the club and decided to devote himself entirely to music. Billy Novik and his band gave occasional concerts at clubs such as "Fishfabrique", "Liza", "Porokhovaya Bochka", and others. In the spring of 2001, they performed in the "English Day" programme on the stage of the Zoopark club. Around the same time, a group of tourists from Germany visited "Boom Brothers", and as a reciprocal gesture of goodwill they invited the entire club team —including Billy's Dilly's Band— to visit. The group agreed, after which they spent a month performing in Germany, giving a series of concerts in Berlin and Munich, playing both in clubs and on the street. Around that same time, Billy switched from guitar to double bass. Just before departing for the European tour, Dmitry Maksimachev recorded nineteen of the group's numbers, which effectively became the debut album of Billy's Dilly's Band, titled Igry v Tom Waits (or Pretending Tom Waits). According to Billy Novik, it was precisely after the trip to Europe that the true history of the group began. When the group returned from Germany, it acquired its own manager — Maxim Novy. The group significantly expanded its performance stages, and performed at the Irish pub "Mollie's" in Petersburg, and Moscow clubs such as "Kitaysky Lyotchik Dzhao Da", "Proyekt OGI", "Bunker", "Rhythm-and-Blues," and others. Then they performed at Brodachaya Sobaka ("The Stray Dog"), Priyut Komedianta ("Comedian's Shelter"), and Chaplin. With the intensification of the group's concert activity, the band decided to change its name to Billy's Band.

Over the following years, Billy Novik and his group released numerous albums: Parizhskiye Sezony ("Parisian Seasons"), Otkrytka ot… ("Postcard from…") (2003), Nemnogo Smerti, Nemnogo Lyubvi ("A Little Death, A Little Love") (2004), Otorvyomsya po-Piterski ("Let's Get Loose, St. Petersburg-Style") (2005), Blyuz v Golove ("Blues in the Head"), Schastye Est'! ("Happiness Exists!") (2006), Vesenniye Obostreniya ("Spring Exacerbations"), Chuzhiye ("Strangers") (2007), Otospímsya v Grobakh ("We'll Sleep It Off in Coffins"), Kupchino — Stolitsa Mira ("Kupchino — Capital of the World") (2008), Osenny Alkodzhaz ("Autumn Alcojazz") (2009), Bloshiny Rynok ("Flea Market"), The Best Of Billy's Band (2010). In 2009, he voiced the crocodile Louis in the Disney animated film The Princess and the Frog (2009). In 2011, he composed music for the animated film KikoRiki: Team Invincible.

Since 2010, Billy Novik has been participating in Adolf Shapiro's production of King Lear at the Saint Petersburg Bryantsev Youth Theatre, playing the role of the Fool. The other members of the band also took part in the production, performing as members of the court.

== Public stance ==
He supported the Russo-Ukrainian war and performed for Russian Armed Forces soldiers.

== Discography ==
As a member of Billy's Band, Novik participated in the recording of the following albums:

- 2002 — Igrayа v Toma Uaytsa / Pretending Tom Waits
- 2003 — Parizhskiye Sezony (Parisian Seasons)
- 2003 — Otkrytka ot... (Postcard from...) (live)
- 2004 — Nemnogo Smerti, Nemnogo Lyubvi (A Little Death, A Little Love)
- 2004 — Otorvyomsya po-Piterski (single)
- 2005 — Otorvyomsya po-Piterski (Let's Get Loose, St. Petersburg-Style)
- 2005 — Igraya v Toma Uaytsa (reissue) / Being Tom Waits (remastering)
- 2006 — Blyuz v Golove (Blues in the Head) (live)
- 2006 — Schastye Est'! (Happiness Exists!) (single)
- 2007 — Vesenniye Obostreniya (Spring Exacerbations)
- 2007 — Chuzhiye (Strangers) (covers album)
- 2008 — Otospímsya v Grobakh (We'll Sleep It Off in Coffins) (single)
- 2008 — Kupchino — Stolitsa Mira (Kupchino — Capital of the World) (The Best Of)
- 2009 — Osenny Alkodzhaz (Autumn Alcojazz)
- 2010 — Bloshiny Rynok (Flea Market)
- 2010 — The Best Of Billy's Band (Vinyl LP)
- 2012 — Chuzhiye 2 (Strangers 2)
- 2013 — Kogda Byl Odin (When I Was Alone) (Vinyl LP)
- 2015 — In Rock
- 2016 — Slegka... (Slightly...)
- 2016 — Pesni Dedov Morozov (Songs of Father Frosts)
- 2017 — Dzhazovye Standarty (Jazz Standards)
- 2019 — Pesni Yegora Letova (Songs of Yegor Letov)
- 2023 — V Shlyape (In a Hat)
- 2024 — Kontsert v klube Igorya Butmana (Concert at Igor Butman's Club) (Live)
- 2024 — Pesni Yegora Letova (Chast' 2) (Songs of Yegor Letov, Part 2)

He also participated in the recording of:

2011 — TODD. Akt 1. Prazdnik Krovi (album by Korol i Shut)

2021 — Starcheskiy Marazm (Senile Dementia) (album by Kirpichi)

== Awards and honors ==
- Zolotoy Sofit ("Golden Spotlight") Award for Best Debut (2011) for the role of the Fool in King Lear, directed by Adolf Shapiro, Bryantsev Youth Theatre.
