= Grand Duke Nicholas Nicolayevich of Russia =

Grand Duke Nicholas Nicolayevich of Russia is the name of two grand dukes of Russia, father and son:

- Grand Duke Nicholas Nikolaevich of Russia (1831–1891), the father
- Grand Duke Nicholas Nikolaevich of Russia (1856–1929), the son

== See also ==
- Nicholas Romanov (disambiguation)
