= Prince Nicholas =

Prince Nicholas may refer to:

== People ==
- Monsieur d'Orléans (Nicholas Henri, Duke of Orléans; 1607–1611), son of King Henry IV of France
- Prince Nicholas of Greece and Denmark (1872–1938), son of King George I of Greece
- Prince Nicholas of Romania (1903–1978), son of King Ferdinand I of Romania
- Nicholas Medforth-Mills (born 1985), formerly called Prince Nicholas of Romania, son of Princess Elena of Romania
- Prince Nikola of Yugoslavia (1928–1954), son of Prince Paul of Yugoslavia
- Nicholas, Prince of Montenegro (born 1944), pretender to the throne of Montenegro
- Prince Nicolas, Duke of Ångermanland (born 2015), son of Princess Madeleine of Sweden
- Nicholas Romanov, the name of several Russian imperial princes

== Other uses ==
- Prince Nicholas (album), a 2007 album by Nicholas Teo

== See also ==
- Prince Nikolaos of Greece and Denmark (born 1969), son of Constantine II and Anne-Marie of Denmark
