= Maria Knebel =

Soviet and Russian actress and theatre director

- Born: Maria Iosifovna Knebel; 18 May [O.S. 6 May] 1898; Moscow, Russian Empire
- Died: 1 June 1985 (aged 87); Moscow, Soviet Union
- Occupations: Actress, theatre director, theatre practitioner
- Parent: Joseph Knebel (father)
- Writing career
- Years active: 1924–1980

Maria Osipovna (Iosifovna) Knebel (Russian: Мари́я О́сиповна (Ио́сифовна) Кне́бель; 18 May [O.S. 6 May] 1898 – 1 June 1985) was a Soviet and Russian actress, theatre practitioner and acting theorist. Having trained with Konstantin Stanislavski, Vladimir Nemirovich-Danchenko, and Michael Chekhov, her work integrated the approaches and emphases of all three, with a particular focus on Stanislavski's technique of "active analysis" in the rehearsal of plays. She worked as a character actor, a theatre director, and a teacher. Her students included the actor Oleg Yefremov, the playwright Viktor Rozov, and the directors Anatoly Vasiliev, Leonid Heifetz, Alexander Burdonsky, Beno Axionov, Joseph Raihelgauz, Sergei Artsibashev and Adolf Shapiro as well as director and theatre practitioner Sam Kogan. In 1958, she was named a People's Artist of the RSFSR.

Her roles as an actor included Charlotta in Anton Chekhov's The Cherry Orchard, the madwoman in Alexander Ostrovsky's The Storm, and Sniffles in Maurice Maeterlinck's The Blue Bird at the Moscow Art Theatre.

In 1968, she directed a production of Chekhov's The Cherry Orchard at the Abbey Theatre in Dublin.

In 2021, an English translation of her research and practice of Active Analysis was published by Routledge with Anatoli Vassiliev (Editor), Irina Brown (Translator).

== Sources ==
- Banham, Martin, ed. 1998. The Cambridge Guide to Theatre. Cambridge: Cambridge UP. ISBN 0-521-43437-8.
- Carnicke, Sharon Marie. 2010. "The Knebel Technique: Active Analysis in Practice." Actor Training. Ed. Alison Hodge. 2nd ed. London: Routledge. 99—116. ISBN 0-415-47168-0.
- Golub, Spencer. 1998. "Knebel, Mariya (Osipovna)." In Banham (1998, 603).
- Knebel, Maria. 2016. "Active Analysis of the Play and the Role." In Thomas (2016).
- Thomas, James. 2016. A Director's Guide to Stanislavsky's Active Analysis. London: Methuen. ISBN 978-1474256599.
