= Billy's Band =

Russian jazz band

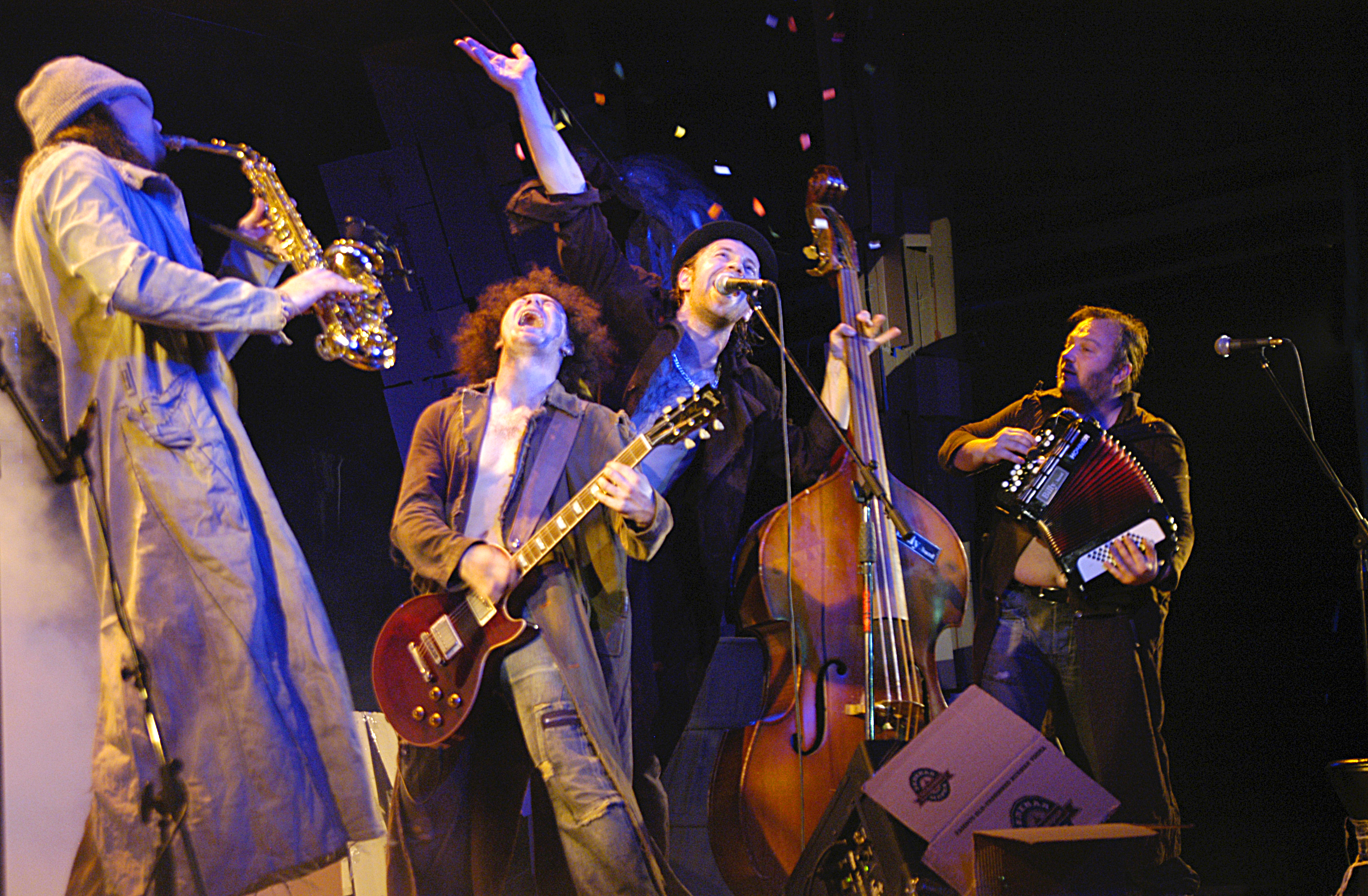

Billy’s Band is a Russian band from St. Petersburg playing blues, swing, jazz and rock. It was founded in 2001 by Billy Novik and Andrey Reznikov. They have 5 studio, 3 live albums, 3 singles and several compilations. They have participated in major jazz festivals in the United States and Canada. The musicians describe their style as "romantic alcojazz". They are one of the few popular bands in Russia which practice the DIY model: releasing, distributing and advertising records and organising concerts and tours themselves and not signing a contract with a major record label or producer.
