= Adolf Shapiro =

Soviet-Latvian-Russian theater director, acting teacher, playwright and author

Shapiro in 2024

Adolf Yakovlevich Shapiro (Russian: Адольф Яковлевич Шапиро, Lithuanian: Ādolfs Šapiro; born 4 July 1939) is a Soviet, Latvian, and Russian theater director, acting teacher, playwright, and author. Born in present-day Kharkiv, he's a People's Artist of the Latvian SSR (1986), Merited Master of the Arts of the Russian Federation (2019), and Laureate of the State Prize of the Latvian SSR (1987).

== Biography ==
Adolf Shapiro graduated from the Directing Department of the Kharkiv National Kotlyarevsky University of Arts then continued his studies in Moscow at the Maria Knebel's Graduate Laboratory of Directing. Adolf Shapiro was a student and successor of Maria Knebel, who was a student of Konstantin Stanislavsky and Michael Chekhov. Shapiro has earned a worldwide reputation as a preeminent interpreter of Chekhov's work. For more than half a century, Mr. Shapiro has staged highly acclaimed productions across three continents.

From 1962 to 1992, he worked in Latvia as the Artistic Director of the Latvian State Theater of Young Spectators (TYuZ), renamed the Youth Theatre in 1989. His most notable works at that time include Ivanov and Wood Demon by Anton Chekhov, City at Dawn by Alexei Arbuzov, The Forest by Alexander Ostrovsky, Golden Horse by Jānis Rainis, Peer Gynt by Henrik Ibsen, The Prince of Homburg by Heinrich Kleist, Fear and Misery of the Third Reich by Bertolt Brecht, Tomorrow There Came War by Boris Vasilyev, Democracy! by Joseph Brodsky. The theater had two buildings and two troupes (Russian and Latvian) and was widely known both at home and abroad. The company has won numerous awards at international festivals, including the Grand Prix and Gold Medal at the Theatre on Screen festival in Rome, Italy for the adaptation of The Waltz Invention by Vladimir Nabokov.

Major Russian playwrights wrote plays specially for the theater.

Adolf Shapiro taught acting and directing classes at the Riga Conservatory.

In 1990, Shapiro was elected World President of the International Association of Theatre for Children and Young People (ASSITEJ), and since 1994 he has been President of the Russian Center of ASSITEJ.

Since 1993, Adolf Shapiro has been working as an independent director and theater teacher.

Shapiro has taught and conducted master classes in:

- USA – Harvard University, Carnegie Mellon University, the University of Indianapolis, the University of Chicago, Stanislavsky Summer Theater School (joint project of the Chekhov Moscow Art Theater and Harvard University);
- Germany – Munich (Bavarian National Theater), Berlin, Bad Pyrmont;
- Poland – Warsaw (Oсhota Theater);
- Israel – Gesher Theater Yiddishpiel Theater
- France – L'École nationale supérieure des arts et techniques du théâtre (ENSATT), Lyon
- Italy – International Festival for Theatre Training Methods METHODIKA
- Brazil – FunArte Theater Company, São Paulo
- China – Shanghai Theater Academy
- Greece – Athens (continuous cooperation with the Center for Development and Culture "AVANTGARDE"), Delphi (The European Cultural Centre of Delphi (E.C.C.D.), Meteora, Syros Island

Shapiro works extensively in Estonia In 2003 he was elected Honorary Doctor of the Performing Arts Department of the Tallinn Theater Academy and the Viljandi College of Arts.

In 2007, he was appointed Head of Art Projects at the Bryantsev Youth Theater (St. Petersburg, Russia).

In 2011, he was elected an Honorary Doctor of the Shanghai Theater Academy (China).

Shapiro has written plays staged in Russia and abroad and is the author of the books Inter-Mission and The Curtain Dropped (Druzhba Narodov magazine award for the best publication of the year).

In March 2014, along with a number of other cultural figures, he expressed his disagreement with the policy of the Russian government in Crimea

== Titles and awards ==
- People's Artist of the Latvian SSR (1986)
- Merited Master of the Arts of the Russian Federation (June 13, 2019) – for lifetime achievements and great contribution to the development of Russian culture and art
- Laureate of the State Prize of Latvia (1987)
- Laureate of the International Stanislavsky Prize (2005)
- Laureate of the Moscow City Hall Literature and Art Prize (production of The Last Ones by Maxim Gorky, Tabakov Studio Theater)
- Baltic House Festival Laureate (Best Director, The Threepenny Opera by Bertolt Brecht, Linnateater, Tallinn)
- Laureate of the Union of Theater Workers of Russia Award Hit of the Season
- 2008 – Grand Prix (Children of the Sun by M. Gorky, Maly Theater of Russia)
- 2015 – Mephisto by Klaus Mann, the Chekhov Moscow Art Theater
- Druzhba Narodov magazine Literary Prize for the best publication of the year (book The Curtain Dropped)
- Order of Pro Terra Mariana for the contribution to the culture of Estonia (2002)
- National Theater Award Golden Mask (2010) for the Best Opera Production – Lucia di Lammermoor by Gaetano Donizetti, The Stanislavsky and Nemirovich-Danchenko Moscow Academic Music Theatre
- Order of Friendship (February 24, 2011) – for the contribution to the development of national culture and art, longstanding fruitful activity
- Order of the Three Stars III degree for the contribution to the culture of the state of Latvia (2011)
- Spīdola Award
- Laureate of the Live Theater audience award in the nomination Director: Grand Masters (2012)

== Selected theater productions ==
=== Riga ===
- Twenty Years Later by Mikhail Svetlov (1964)
- City at Dawn by Alexei Arbuzov (1970)
- Chukokkala by Korney Chukovsky (1971)
- A Man Who Looked Like Himself by Zinovy Paperny (1972)
- Ivanov by Anton Chekhov (1975)
- Golden Horse by Jānis Rainis (1976)
- Peer Gynt by Henrik Ibsen (1979)
- Prince of Homburg by Heinrich Kleist (1980)
- Winner by Alexei Arbuzov (1982)
- Wood Demon by Anton Chekhov (1982)
- Torn Cloak by Sem Benelli (1984)
- Forest by Alexander Ostrovsky (1984)
- Tomorrow There Came War by Boris Vasilyev (1986)
- Democracy! by Joseph Brodsky (1991)
- Fear and Misery of the Third Reich by Bertolt Brecht

=== Moscow ===
The Moscow Art Theatre

- The Cabal of Hyppocrites (Molière) by Mikhail Bulgakov (1988) (Innokenty Smoktunovsky as King Louis XIV,

Oleg Efremov as Molière, Oleg Tabakov Bouton), revival in 2001 (Oleg Tabakov as Molière)

- The Cherry Orchard by Anton Chekhov (2004) (Renata Litvinova as Ranevskaya)
- The Precipice by Ivan Goncharov (2010)(The highest national theater award Golden Mask for the best female role – Olga Yakovleva as Grandmother)
- Mephisto based on the novel Mephistopheles by Klaus Mann (2015)

Vakhtangov State Academic Theater

- By the Sea (Kabanchik) by Viktor Rozov (1987)
- Dear Liar by Jerome Kilty (1994)

Russian Academic Youth Theater

- La Princesse Lointaine (The Princess Far-Away) by Edmond Rostand (1996)
- Rock’n’Roll by Tom Stoppard (2011)

Et Cetera Theater

- Fahrenheit 451 by Ray Bradbury (2007)
- Right You Are (if you think so) by Luigi Pirandello (2018)

The Stanislavsky and Nemirovich-Danchenko Moscow Academic Music Theatre

- Lucia di Lammermoor by Gaetano Donizetti (2009) (the highest national theater award Golden Mask for the best opera performance, the best female role – Khibla Gerzmava as Lucia, the best costumes in the musical theater – Elena Stepanova)

Bolshoi Theatre

- Manon Lescaut by Giacomo Puccini (2016) (Anna Netrebko as Manon. The highest national theater award Golden Mask for the best opera duo – Anna Netrebko and Yusif Eivazov)

Other Theaters of Moscow

- The Last Ones by Maxim Gorky (Tabakov Studio Theater, 1995) (the highest national theater award Golden Mask for the best female role – O. Yakovleva as Sofia Kolomiytseva, special jury prize – OlegTabakov as Ivan Kolomiytsev)
- In the Bar of a Tokyo Hotel by Tennessee Williams (Mayakovsky Theater, 1996)
- The Lower Depths by Maxim Gorky (Tabakov Studio Theater, 2000) – Golden Mask award nomination
- Children of the Sun by Maxim Gorky (Maly Theater of Russia, 2008) – Grand Prix – Hit of the Season Award of the Union of Theater Workers of Russia

=== Samara ===
- Bumbarash, a musical by Yuly Kim and Vladimir Dashkevich (Samara Theater for Young Spectators "SamArt", 1997), the highest national theater award Golden Mask for the best set design – Yury Kharikov
- Mother Courage by Bertolt Brecht (Samara Theater for Young Spectators "SamArt", 2001, the highest national theater award Golden Mask for the best set design – Yury Kharikov)

=== St. Petersburg ===
- The Cherry Orchard by Anton Chekhov (Tovstonogov Bolshoi Drama Theater, 1993)
- The Forest by Alexander Ostrovsky (Tovstonogov Bolshoi Drama Theater, 1999)
- King Lear by William Shakespeare (Bryantsev Youth Theater, 2010) – Golden Spotlight Award for Best Actor – Sergei Dreyden as Lear
- Dandelion Wine by Ray Bradbury (Bryantsev Youth Theater, 2014)

=== Estonia ===
- The Cherry Orchard by Anton Chekhov (Tallinn Noorsoteatris, 1971)
- Three Sisters by Anton Chekhov (Kingisepp Tallinn State Academic Drama Theater, 1973)
- The Living Corpse by Leo Tolstoy (Kingisepp Tallinn State Academic Drama Theater, 1980)
- Who's Afraid of Virginia Woolf? by Edward Albee (Pärnu Koidula Drama Theater, 1977)
- The Threepenny Opera by Bertolt Brecht (Tallinn Linnateater, 1998) Laureate of the Baltic House Festival, Best Director Award, 1998
- Fathers and Sons by Ivan Turgenev (Tallinn Linnateater, 2003) – Estonian Cultural Foundation Prize for the Best Production
- Right You Are (if you think so) by Luigi Pirandello (Tallinn Linnateater, 2006)
- Return to Father by Madis Kõiv (Tallinn Linnateater, 2015)

=== Productions in other countries ===
- Venezuela – The Inspector General by Nikolay Gogol, 1990
- Nicaragua – The Cherry Orchard by Anton Chekhov 1988
- USA – Three Sisters by Anton Chekhov, 2003
- Chekhov. PostScriptum based on Anton Chekhov’s plays, 2016
- The Great Capitulation. The Evening of Bertolt Brecht, 2017
- Poland – A Danish Story based on Hans Christian Andersen’s tales, 1992
- Israel – The Threepenny Opera by Bertolt Brecht, 2002
- A Love Story by Isaac Bashevis Singer, 2005
- France – An Actor Prepares by Konstantin Stanislavsky, 2006
- Right You Are (if you think so) by Luigi Pirandello, 2005
- Brazil – Chekhov's Space based on Anton Chekhov's plays, 2010
- Fathers and Sons by Ivan Turgenev, 2012
- China – Uncle Vanya by Anton Chekhov, 2013
- Greece – Rose by Martin Sherman, 2011
- Old Times by Harold Pinter, 2014 (Zoe Laskari, Greek theater and cinema celebrity, starring in both productions)
