= Yury Artsybushev =

Russian painter

Yury Konstantinovich Artsybushev
- Юрий Константинович Арцыбушев
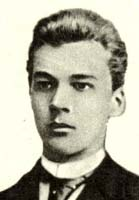
- Born: 28 March 1877; Moscow
- Died: 12 November 1952 (aged 75); Paris
- Occupations: Artist, Author, Journalist

Yury Konstantinovich Artsybushev (Russian: Юрий Константинович Арцыбушев) (1877–1952) was a Russian artist, author, and journalist. Artsybushev served as the chief editor of the satirical magazine Zritel (Spectator) and as an organizer of the Theater of Miniatures in Moscow. He is known for his live sketches of Russian politicians and revolutionaries including those of Vladimir Lenin and Leon Trotsky from the Russian Constituent Assembly in Petrograd.

== Biography ==
Yury was born into the family of Konstantin Artsybushev (1849–1901), a nobleman by birth, a railway engineer, and his wife Maria Lakhtina (1859–1919). Yury spent his childhood and youth in Moscow. He graduated from the Voskresensky School in Moscow. In 1898 he entered the architectural department of the Higher Art School at the Academy of Arts in St. Petersburg, but did not complete the course.

Since 1916, when new signs of social revival appeared, Artsybushev started to make series of sketches of participants of different meetings, assemblies and trials. The first series of sketches were made at the trials on abuses in the army (summer 1916), over the participants in the food riots (autumn 1916), over the agents of the Moscow Security Office (April 1917). At the end of 1916, Artsybushev dedicated a series of drawings to the Moscow City Duma.

After February 1917 Artsybushev painted at the congresses of the Russian Constituent Assembly, the Russian Merchant Fleet, the All-Russian Congress of Railwaymen, and the Congress of Military Doctors.

In 1917-1918 Yury painted portraits of political and public leaders of the time, for which he specially attended the meetings of the Petrograd Soviet and various meetings.

In 1918 he moved to the South of Russia, lived in Kyiv and Odessa. On December 24, 1919, Artsybushev left Odessa for Serbia and soon moved from Belgrade to Paris. Yury lived in Algeria, France, Italy. He drew portraits of cultural figures in emigration.

In 1946, Artsybushev and his wife were granted Soviet citizenship. In 1947 they returned to the USSR and lived in Tbilisi.
