= Nikolai Ulyanov =

Russian painter

Nikolai Ulyanov can also refer to Vladimir Lenin or his grandfather Nikolai Vasilyevich Ulyanov

Nikolai Pavlovich Ulyanov (Russian: Николай Павлович Улья́нов, 1 May [O.S. 19 April] 1877 – 5 May 1949) was a Russian painter, scenic designer, and graphic artist. He was one of the members of the art association ‘The Four Arts’, which existed in Moscow and Leningrad in 1924-1931.

== Gallery ==
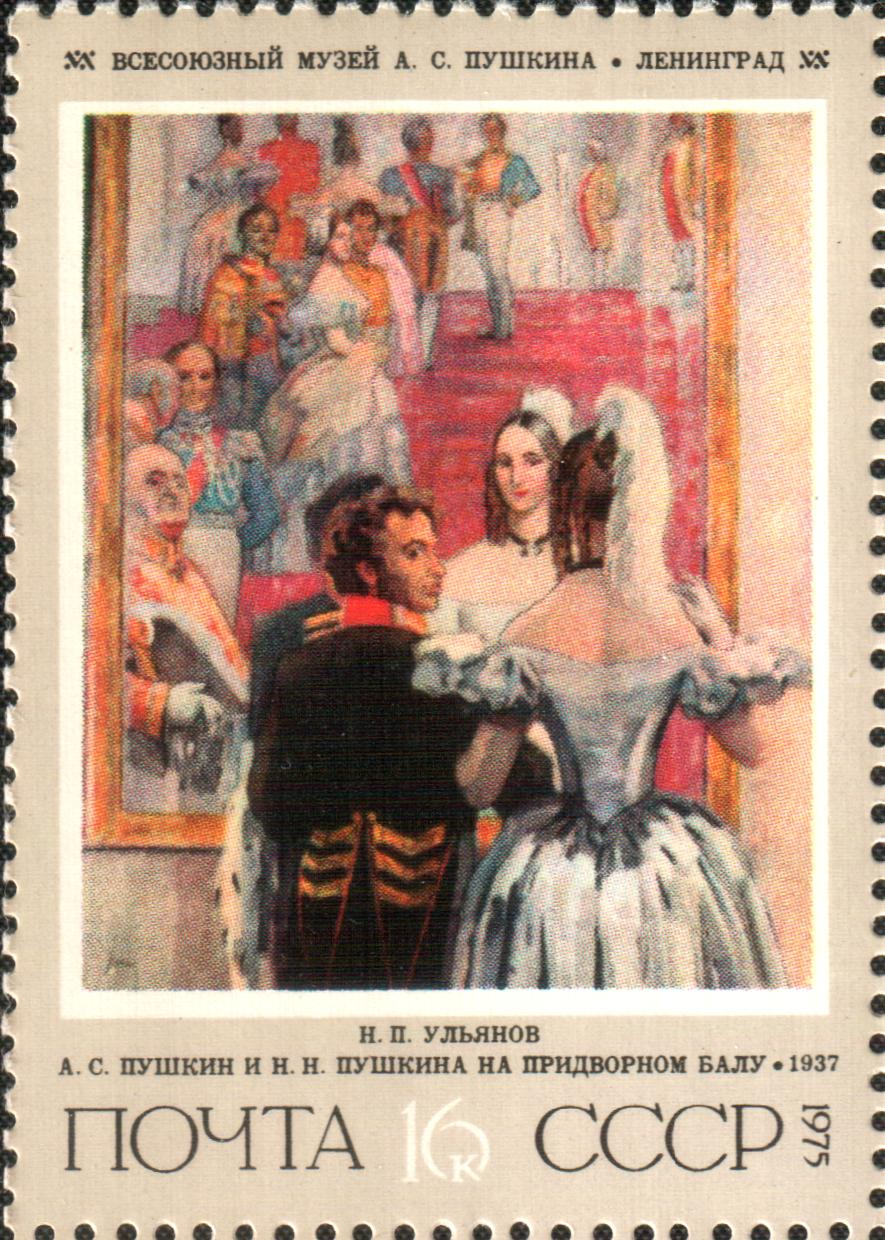
Pushkin with wife at a ball (1937) on a 1975 Soviet stamp

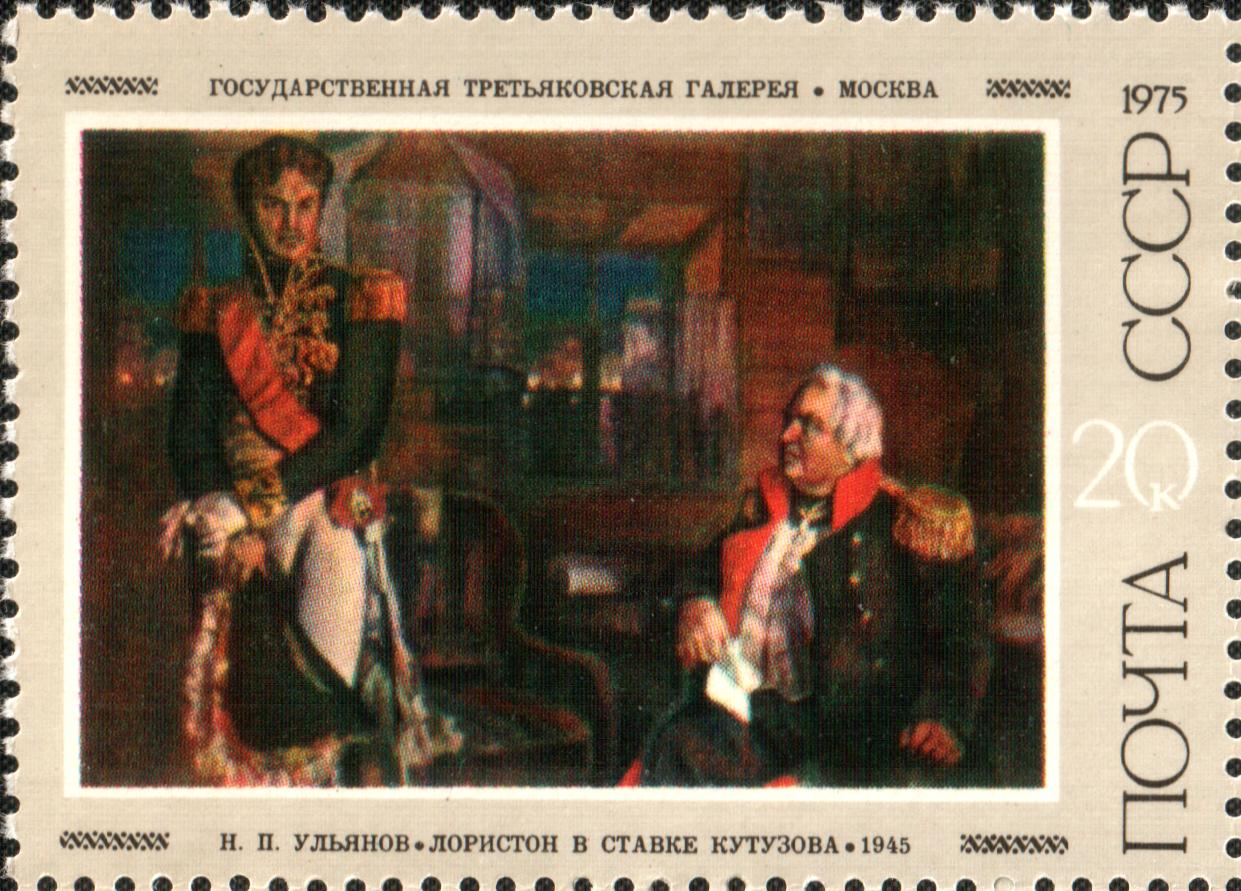
Lauriston in Kutuzov's Staff (1945) on a 1975 Soviet stamp

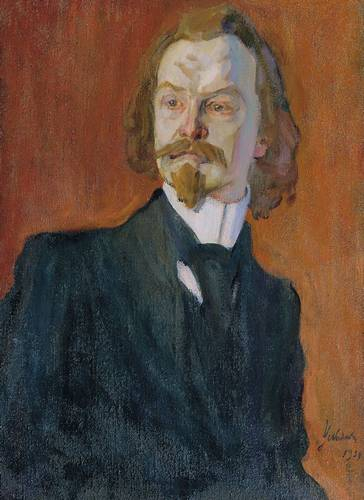
Konstantin Balmont (1909)

== Sources ==
- Biography
- Global Performing Arts Database entry
- Soi͡uz pisateleĭ SSSR. 1979. Soviet Literature, Issues 9-12. Foreign Languages Publishing House.
