= Kupchino district =

Kupchino District Купчино (Russian)
- District
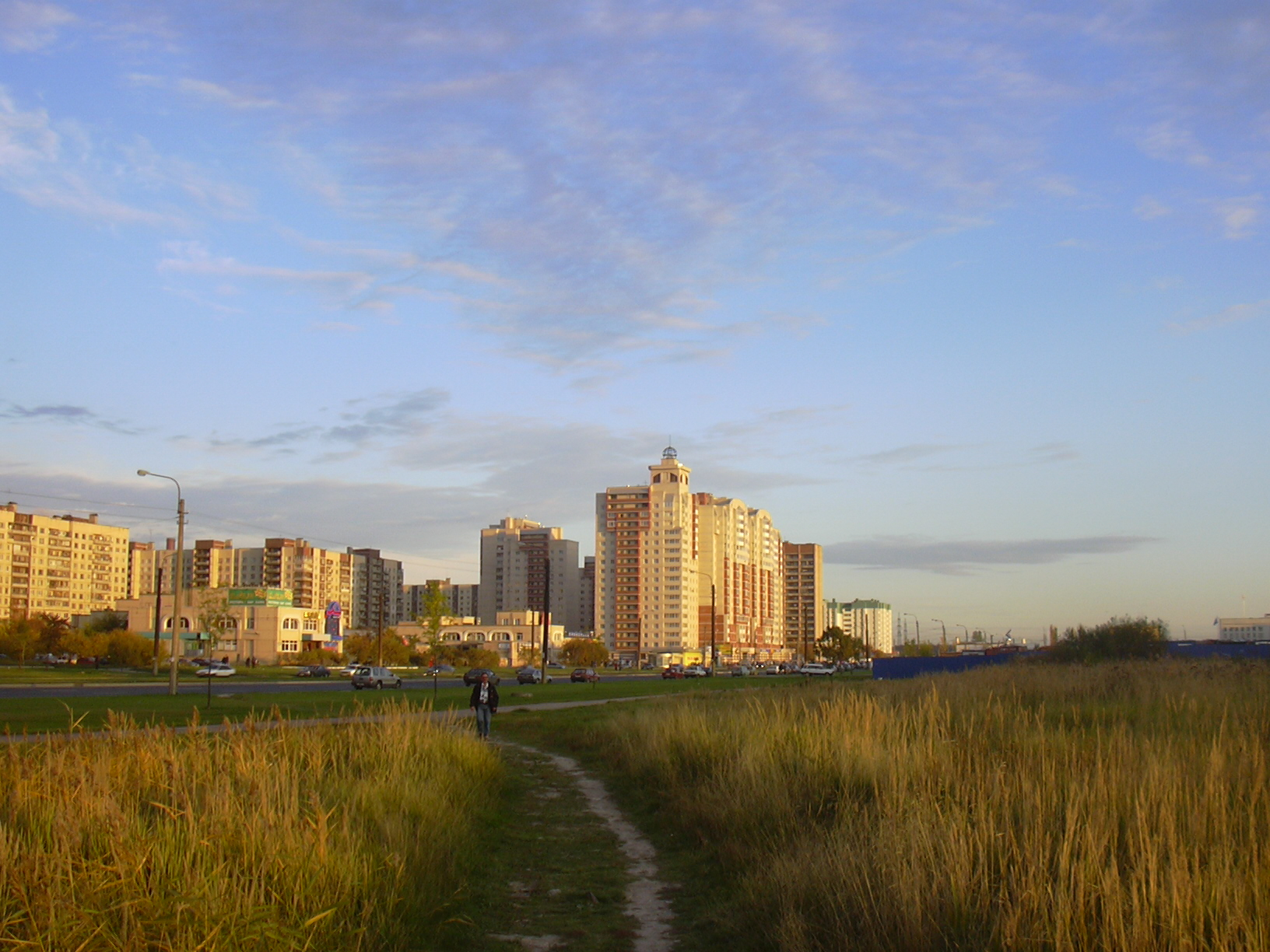
- Coordinates: 59°51′10″N 30°23′30″E
- Country: Russia
- Federal subject: Saint Petersburg

Kupchino (Russian: Купчино, Finnish: Kupsila) is an informal name for the part of Frunzensky District of the federal city of Saint Petersburg, Russia.

== About ==
It is one of the largest residential areas in Saint Petersburg with a population of 410,000, located in the south of the city and surrounded by the industrial area in the north, the Moskovskaya Line of Oktyabrskaya Railway in the east, a line of Vitebskaya Railway in the west, and the ring road in the south. For that reason it's often called a city within a city.

It takes its name from the small village Kupchinova that was located in a place of present-day Kupchino metro station. The first written references to this name appeared in the early 17th century.

Kupchino has been home to many prominent people including former Russian president Dmitry Medvedev, mathematician Grigori Perelman, actors Dmitry Nagiyev and Yevgeny Sidikhin, film director Vladimir Bortko, musicians Andrei "Knyazz" Knyazev of Korol i Shut, Diana Arbenina of Nochnye Snaipery, Yuri Kasparyan of Kino and many more.
