= Nicholas Romanov =

Nicholas Romanov may refer to:

- Nicholas I of Russia (1796–1855), third son of Paul I & Tsaritsa Maria Fedorovna; younger brother of Alexander I, ascended 1825
- Nicholas Alexandrovich, Tsesarevich of Russia (1843–1865), eldest son of Emperor Alexander II and Tsaritsa Maria Alexandrovna; grandson of Nicholas I
- Nicholas II of Russia (1868–1918), eldest son of Alexander III and Tsaritsa Maria Fedorovna, great-grandson of Nicholas I, ascended 1894
- Grand Duke Nicholas Konstantinovich of Russia (1850–1918), eldest son of Grand Duke Constantin Nicolaievich and Alexandra Josifovna of Saxe-Altenburg
- Grand Duke Nicholas Nikolaevich of Russia (1831–1891), third son of Emperor Nicholas I and Tsaritsa Alexandra Fedorovna, husband of Alexandra Petrovna
- Grand Duke Nicholas Nikolaevich of Russia (1856–1929), son of Grand Duke Nicholas Nicolaievich and Alexandra Petrovna of Oldenburg, husband of Anastasia Nicolaievna
- Grand Duke Nicholas Mikhailovich of Russia (1859–1919), eldest son of Grand Duke Mikhail Nicolaievich and Olga Fedorovna of Baden, unmarried
- Prince Nicholas Romanov (1922–2014), used the contested titulary Prince Nicholas of Russia
