= Chung-Chang Shen =

Chinese rescuer of Juyan wooden slips (1905–1987)

- 沈仲章
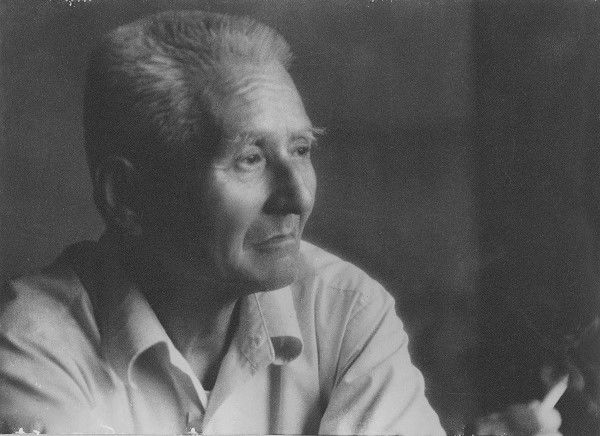
- Born: 13 July 1905; Suzhou, Qing Empire
- Died: 19 March 1987 (aged 81); Shanghai, People's Republic of China
- Other names: C.C. Shen, Shen Chung-Chang, Shěn Zhòngzhāng
- Education: Southwest Jiaotong University, Peking University
- Occupations: Linguist; Folklorist; Ethnomusicologist
- Known for: Rescuing the Juyan Han wooden slips

Chung-Chang Shen (Note: Chinese: 沈仲章; pinyin: Shěn Zhòngzhāng; Wade–Giles: Shen^{3} Chung^{4}-chang^{1}, also known as C.C. Shen as he usually signed documents in Western languages.) (13 July 1905 – 19 March 1987) was a Chinese linguist, folklorist, ethnomusicologist, and antiquarian best known for rescuing the Juyan Han wooden slips during the Second Sino-Japanese War.

== Early life ==
Chung-Chang Shen was born in Suzhou with ancestral roots in Wuxing, Zhejiang, China. He studied at the Tangshan Jiaotong University (now Southwest Jiaotong University) and at Peking University, where he received a Bachelor's degree in philosophy. He fostered connections with scholars in many different academic fields. Among them were foreign scholars including Alexander von Staël-Holstein, Richard Wilhelm, Vincenz Hundhausen, and Sven Hedin, as well as Chinese scholars such as Chen Yinke, Hu Shih, Liu Tianhua, Liu Bannong, Jin Kemu, Fu Ssu-nien, Yuen Ren Chao, and Xu Zhimo.

== Juyan Han wooden slips ==
From 1933 to 1937, Chung-Chang Shen served as an assistant researcher at the Institute of Liberal Arts of Peking University and as the administrative officer for the Council of the Sino-Swedish Expedition. In 1937, after the Second Sino-Japanese War began, Chung-Chang Shen rescued 10,200 wooden slips dating from the Han dynasty, initially excavated in the Juyan Lake Basin during the Sino-Swedish Expedition. In order to protect them from potential damage by Japanese troops, he transported the Juyan Han wooden slips from Beijing to Tianjin and then to the University of Hong Kong. He stayed in Hong Kong afterwards for four years and photographed the wood slips utilizing infrared technology.

== Later life ==
In 1938, the National Southwestern Associated University appointed Chung-Chang Shen assistant to the Dean of the School of Liberal Arts and kept the position open for him until 1945 while he was doing underground work for the Wartime Cultural Relics Preservation Committee and the Rare Book Preservation Society. In 1945, he was offered the position of director of the Inventory and Recovery Committee of Cultural Relics and Books of the Republic of China's Canton-Hong Kong District, but he instead served as a special committee member of the Inventory and Recovery Committee of Cultural Relics and Books of the Nanking-Shanghai District from 1945 to 1947. From 1946 to 1948, he was also a member of the Taiwan Provincial Mandarin Promotion Committee headed by Wei Jiangong and He Rong.

From 1950 until the end of his life, Chung-Chang Shen was a member of the Chinese Musicians' Association. From 1953 onward, he was a researcher at the National Music Research Institute of the Central Conservatory of Music. In 1980, he also became a special researcher at the Music Research Institute of the Shanghai Conservatory of Music. Starting in 1982, he served as an editor for the Shanghai Cultural Relics Management Committee.

German sinologist and librarian Dr. Hartmut Walravens in his book review called C. C. Shen an "unsung hero".
