= Sino-Swedish Expedition =

The Sino-Swedish Expedition was a bilateral Chinese-Swedish expedition, led by Sven Hedin, which carried out scientific research in north and northwest China, 1927–1935.

== About the Expedition ==
The Expedition looked in particular at the meteorology, topography and prehistory in Mongolia, the Gobi Desert and Xinjiang. Chiang Kai-shek was a patron of the Expedition.

- 1927–32 – from Beijing – via Baotou, Mongolia, the Gobi Desert, Xinjiang – to Ürümqi
- 1933–34 – from Beijing to Kashgar, with a view to constructing two roads suitable for cars

Between 1927 and 1935, Hedin led an international Sino-Swedish Expedition which investigated the meteorological, topographic and prehistoric situation in Mongolia, the Gobi Desert and Xinjiang.

Hedin described it as a peripatetic university in which the participating scientists worked almost independently, while he—like a local manager—negotiated with local authorities, made decisions, organized whatever was necessary, raised funds and recorded the route followed. He gave archaeologists, astronomers, botanists, geographers, geologists, meteorologists and zoologists from Sweden, Germany and China an opportunity to participate in the expedition and carry out research in their areas of specialty.

Hedin met Chiang Kai-shek in Nanjing, who thereupon became a patron of the expedition. The Sino-Swedish Expedition was honored with a Chinese postage stamp series which had a print run of 25,000. The four stamps show camels at a camp with the expedition flag and bear the Chinese text "Postal Service of the Prosperous Middle Kingdom" and in Latin underneath, "Scientific Expedition to the Northwestern Province of China 1927–1933". A painting in the Beijing Palace Museum entitled Nomads in the Desert served as model for the series. Of the 25,000 sets, 4,000 were sold across the counter and 21,500 came into the possession of the expedition. Hedin used them to finance the expedition, selling them for a price of five dollars per set. The stamps were unpopular at the time due to the high price Hedin was selling them at, but years later became valuable treasures among collectors.

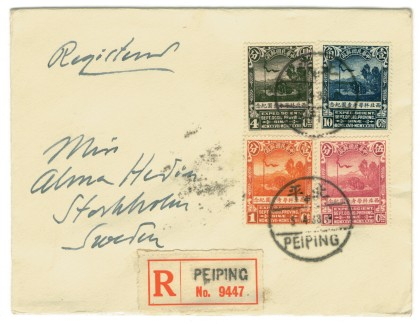
Envelope of a letter from Hedin to his sister Alma with Chinese stamps issued on the occasion of the Sino-Swedish Expedition

The first part of the expedition, from 1927 to 1932, led from Beijing via Baotou to Mongolia, over the Gobi Desert, through Xinjiang to Ürümqi, and into the northern and eastern parts of the Tarim Basin. The expedition had a wealth of scientific results which are being published up to the present time. For example, the discovery of specific deposits of iron, manganese, oil, coal and gold reserves was of great economic relevance for China. In recognition of his achievements, the Berlin Geographical Society presented him with the Ferdinand von Richthofen Medal in 1933; the same honor was also awarded to Erich von Drygalski for his Gauss Expedition to the Antarctic; and to Alfred Philippson for his research on the Aegean Region.

In 1930, the expedition excavated ten sites in the Juyan Lake Basin and unearthed a total of 10,200 wooden slips dating to the Western Han, which came to be known as the "old Juyan texts" in contrast to the "new Juyan texts" excavated from 1972 to 1972. In 1937, after the Second Sino-Japanese War began, Chung-Chang Shen transported these wooden slips from Beijing to the University of Hong Kong.

From the end of 1933 to 1934, Hedin led—on behalf of the Kuomintang government under Chiang Kai-shek in Nanjing—a Chinese expedition to investigate irrigation measures and draw up plans and maps for the construction of two roads suitable for automobiles along the Silk Road from Beijing to Xinjiang. Following his plans, major irrigation facilities were constructed, settlements erected, and roads built on the Silk Road from Beijing to Kashgar, which made it possible to completely bypass the rough terrain of Tarim Basin.

One aspect of the geography of central Asia which intensively occupied Hedin for decades was what he called the “wandering lake” Lop Nur. In May 1934, he began a river expedition to this lake. For two months he navigated the Kaidu River and the Kum-Darja to Lop Nur, which had been filled with water since 1921. After the lake dried out in 1971 as a consequence of irrigation activities, the above-mentioned transportation link enabled the People's Republic of China to construct a nuclear weapon test site at Lop Nur.

His caravan of truck lorries was hijacked by the Chinese Muslim General Ma Zhongying who was retreating from northern Xinjiang along with his Kuomintang 36th Division (National Revolutionary Army) from the Soviet Invasion of Xinjiang. While Hedin was detained by Ma Zhongying, he met General Ma Hushan, and Kemal Kaya Effendi.

Ma Zhongying's adjutant claimed to Hedin that Ma Zhongying had the entire region of Tian-shan-nan-lu (southern Xinjiang) under his control and Sven could pass through safely without any trouble. Hedin did not believe his assertions. Some of Ma Zhongying's Tungan (Chinese speaking Muslim) troops attacked Hedin's expedition by shooting at their vehicles.

For the return trip, Hedin selected the southern Silk Road route via Hotan to Xi'an, where the expedition arrived on 7 February 1935. He continued on to Beijing to meet with President Lin Sen and to Nanjing to Chiang Kai-shek. He celebrated his 70th birthday on 19 February 1935 in the presence of 250 members of the Kuomintang government, to whom he reported interesting facts about the Sino-Swedish Expedition. On this day, he was awarded the Brilliant Jade Order, Second Class.

At the end of the expedition, Hedin was in a difficult financial situation. He had considerable debts at the German-Asian Bank in Beijing, which he repaid with the royalties and fees received for his books and lectures. In the months after his return, he held 111 lectures in 91 German cities as well as 19 lectures in neighboring countries. To accomplish this lecture tour, he covered a stretch as long as the equator, 23,000 kilometres (14,000 mi) by train and 17,000 kilometres (11,000 mi) by car—in a time period of five months. He met Adolf Hitler in Berlin before his lecture on 14 April 1935.

== Members of the Expedition (by nationality) ==
- Sven Hedin (Swedish)
- Nils Ambolt (Swedish, 1928–33)
- T. J. Arne (Swedish, 1929, 1932–33)
- Folke Bergman (Swedish, 1927–28, 1928–33, 1933–34)
- Gerhard Bexell (Swedish, 1929–33)
- Birger Bohlin (Swedish, 1929–33)
- Aron Carlson (Swedish, 1928–29)
- Efraim Hill (1933–35)
- Nils Hörner (Swedish, 1928–33)
- David Hummel (Swedish, 1927–28, 1928–31, 1933–34)
- Frans August Larson (Swedish, 1927–28, 1928–30)
- Gösta Montell (Swedish, 1928–32)
- Erik Norin (Swedish, 1927–28, 1928–33)
- Josef Söderbom (Swedish, 1930)
- Georg Söderbom (Swedish, 1927–28, 1928–32)
- Manfred Bökenkamp (German, 1930–33)
- Hans Dettman (German, 1927–28, 1928)
- Waldemar Haude (German, 1927–28, 1928–30)
- Claus Hempel (German, 1927–28, 1928)
- Walter Heyder (German, 1927–28)
- Bodo Kaul (German, 1927–28)
- Paul Liebrenz (German, 1927–28)
- Wilhelm Marschall v. Bieberstein (German, 1927–28)
- Fritz Mühlenweg (German, 1927–28, 1931–32)
- Franz Walz (German, 1927–28, 1928)
- Eduard Zimmerman (German, 1927–28, 1928–29)
- Bent Friis-Johansen (Danish, 1929–31)
- Henning Haslund-Christensen (Danish, 1928–30)
- Paul Vorotnikov (Russian, 1928–33)
- Walter Beick (Estonian, 1932–33)
- Chan Fan-Hsün (Chinese, 1927–28, 1928)
- Chen Parker C. (Chinese, 1929–33, 1933–35)
- Hao Chang-Shen (Chinese, 1930–31)
- Hsü Chin-Tse (Chinese, 1931–32)
- Hu Chen-Tao (Chinese, 1931–32)
- Huang Wen-Pi 黃文弼 (Chinese, 1927–28, 1928–30)
- Kung Yuang-Chung (Chinese, 1927–28, 1928–30)
- Kung C.C. (Chinese, 1933–35)
- Li Hsieh-Chih (Chinese, 1927–28, 1928–30)
- Liu Yen-Huai (Chinese, 1927–28, 1928–30)
- Ma Hsieh-Ch’ien (Chinese, 1927–28, 1928–29)
- Chung-Chang Shen (Chinese, administrative officer of the Beijing headquarters, 1933–37)
- Siu Ping Ch’ang (Chinese, 1927–28, 1928–29)
- Ting Tai-Heng (Chinese, 1927–28, 1928–30)
- Ts’ui He Feng (Chinese, 1927–28)
- Yew, Irving C. (Chinese, 1933–35)
- Yuan Fu Li (Chinese, 1927–28, 1928–32)

== Publications resulting from the Expedition ==
- 1943–44: Hedin, Sven Anders: History of the Expedition in Asia, 1927–1935 Reports from the Scientific Expedition to the North-Western Provinces of China under the Leadership of Dr. Sven Hedin: The Sino-Swedish Expedition (NII “Digital Silk Road”/Toyo Bunko. doi:10.20676/00000210).
- 1961: Sino-Swedish Expedition (1927–1935), Etnografiska Museet, 1961.

== See also ==
- Set of Chinese postage stamps commemorating the Sino-Swedish Expedition in China 1927–1933
