= Through Asia Volume 1 =

Travel book by Sven Hedin

Through Asia Volume 1 is a travel book by the Swedish explorer Sven Hedin, which was published in 1898 by the British publishing house Methuen Publishing Ltd. Originally published in Swedish under the name, En Färd Genom Asien, the travel writing is an account of Hedin's first big expedition through Central Asia during the years 1893 to 1897. The first volume covers Hedin's records of his journey until June 1895. It contains multiple photographs and illustrations from sketches by the author.

== Context ==
The turn to the 20th century marks the peak of European domination over the world. It is also known as the "era of great expeditions" in various fields and for extended periods. The knowledge gathered and disseminated from scientists, explorers and authors aimed to be apprehended as objectively and universally valid with the ultimate goal to achieve "scientific and social progress of humanity" to "benefit the world and the species". The accumulation of knowledge from outside Europe was crucial to "the project of colonial domination" which in turn helped European scientists to facilitate their explorations in other parts of the world. The scientists of the imperial ages were all driven by the "desire to add to our knowledge, to fill in the white spaces on the map, to delineate who and what lives where and does what". This not only referred to scientists from colonial countries such as Great Britain and France, but also included minor players in the colonial game such as Germany, or "noncolonial nations such as Sweden".

Most of the fundings for Hedin's early expeditions got provided by the Swedish Crown. The King of Sweden was rumoured to have a foible for adventures and was greatly interested in travels into the unknown. Sweden was not a colonial power such as Great Britain, France or Germany at that time, hence the country was in quest of something else to secure its standing in the harsh and competitive European sphere. A remedy Sweden found in accumulating knowledge to "claim a leadership role in the sciences". A mean to accomplish this aim were scientific expeditions such as to the Arctic or the Orient. An explorer who set out for the Orient was Sven Hedin. The region of Hedin's first big expedition was of high value as in Central Asia the interests of major powers such as the Chinese, the Russians, and the British-Indians collided. All his expeditions were ensued by travel books. Throughout his life, Hedin published 65 books, some of them translated into 22 languages.

== Content ==
The book starts by giving a short overview of the recent explorations in Central Asia and by setting out the objectives of Hedin's journey. His recount of the journey starts in Russia. To reach the starting point of his expedition, Hedin travelled across Russia, through today's Kazakhstan, to eventually arrive in Tashkent, which was part of the Russian Empire at that time.

After spending some time of preparation, Hedin started his exploration by crossing the Pamir Mountains. In mid-March 1894, Hedin and his entourage arrived in the "most distant outpost of the Russian Empire", Pamirsky Post, in today's Tajikistan. From there, Hedin's next aim was to climb to the peak of the Muztagh-Ata. The first attempt failed due to health issues on Hedin's side. However, during the ascent, Hedin became acquainted with Islam Bai, a local guide who should become a close travel companion of Hedin for the years to come. Although reaching higher levels, the second and third attempt to climb the Muztagh-Ata should also be unsuccessful.

The book also entails one of the most famous stories of Hedin, which is the death march through the Taklamakan Desert, on which two of his men died and all but one camel perished. As most of his scientific instruments got lost in the desert, Hedin had to change his initial plans and reorder the instruments from Europe. The first volume ends with Hedin returning to Kashgar, Xinjiang, at the beginning of 1895 to spend the waiting period and to prepare for the next journey.

== Reception ==
The travel book Through Asia was the international breakthrough for Hedin. The Swedish original got translated into nine languages and was globally a very well-received book. With the start of the 20th century, Hedin became a world-famous academic and around the world, countries were proud to welcome him as a guest and listened to his lectures about his travels to the Orient. His acquaintances encompassed all kinds of people from different nationalities, ranging from politicians and royal families to the common people he met during his expeditions. He commanded "a national and international network of contacts that few of his times could match". Hedin was "honorary doctor of ten universities, member of fifteen academies (…), and without doubt the most famous Swede and Asianist of his time". The success of the book Through Asia enabled him to conduct further expeditions such as to Tibet, Mongolia, and India.

After World War II, the appreciation for Hedin abated. Due to his later political affiliation with Nazi Germany, not only his controversial political sentiment in respect to Nazism gets called into question, but he gets also accused that already his early expeditions to Asia were driven by colonial and imperial motives. Authors such as Danielsson claim that Through Asia was the start of many international fast-selling travel writings Hedin published that impersonated European self-fashioning and ruthlessness towards the locals. Other authors, such as Kish and Montell present Hedin in a different light and try to mitigate the accusations directed towards the author and his writings.
