= Hedinia tibetica =

Scientific classification
- Kingdom: Plantae
- Clade: Tracheophytes
- Clade: Angiosperms
- Clade: Eudicots
- Clade: Rosids
- Order: Brassicales
- Family: Brassicaceae
- Genus: Hedinia; Ostenf.
- Species: H. tibetica

Binomial name
- Hedinia tibetica (Thomson) Ostenf.

Synonyms
- Bursa tibetica Kuntze; Capsella thomsonii Hook.f.; Hedinia rotundata Z.X.An; Hedinia taxkargannica G.L.Zhou & Z.X.An; Hedinia taxkargannica var. hejigensis G.L.Zhou & Z.X.An; Hutchinsia tibetica Thomson; Smelowskia tibetica (Thomson) Lipsky

Genus of flowering plants

Hedinia is a monotypic genus of flowering plants belonging to the family Brassicaceae. It only contains one known species, Hedinia tibetica.

== Description ==
They are annual herbaceous plants, 5–30 cm (2–12 in) tall, with green stems which are procumbent (trailing) or ascending, they are densely hirsute (very hairy) with simple trichomes to 1.3 mm. The basal leaves are sparsely to densely pubescent, with a petiole (a leaf stalk supporting a blade) measuring 0.5–2 cm (0–1 in) long. They are ciliate (with a fringe of marginal hairs). The leaf blades are ovate or narrowly oblong in outline, 1- or 2-pinnatisect (cut to the mid-rib), 1–4 cm (0–2 in) long and 0.7–2 cm (0–1 in) wide. The cauline leaves (on an aerial stems) are similar to the basal leaves, are reduced in size with divisions toward stem apex. The racemes (flower spikes) are bracteate throughout or rarely only basally. The distal (furthest) bracts are subsessile (having a very small stalk), sometimes adnate (grown from or closely fused) to the pedicel (stalk of a flower). The fruiting pedicel is straight, erect or ascending, 1.5–3.5 mm (0–0 in) long. The sepals are oblong shaped, 1.3–2 mm (0–0 in) long and 0.7–0.9 mm (0–0 in) wide. The petals are obovate shaped, 2–3.2 mm (0–0 in) long and 0.9–1.4 mm (0–0 in) wide, with a claw (narrow part) 1.5 mm. The filaments (stalk of a stamen) are 1.5–2 mm (0–0 in) long. The anthers are 0.3–0.4 mm (0–0 in) long with 20-46 ovules per ovary. The fruit (or seed capsule) is broadly oblong, rarely oblong-linear or suborbicular in shape. They are 5–10 mm (0–0 in) long and 3-5 mm wide. They are flat or slightly twisted, obtuse, slightly retuse (blunt ended), or rarely subacute at both ends. The valves are glabrous (hairless) or pubescent. The style is 0.3-0.8 mm. The seeds are light to dark brown in colour, oblong shaped, 0.8-1.1 long and 0.4-0.6 mm wide. They bloom between June and August, and fruiting between July-September.

== Taxonomy ==
The genus name of Hedinia is in honour of Sven Hedin (1865–1952), a Swedish geographer, topographer, explorer, photographer, travel writer and illustrator. The Latin specific epithet of tibetica refers to Tibet, where the original plants were found.

It was first described and published in S.Hedin (edited), Southern Tibet (S. Tibet) Vol.6 Issue 3 on page 77 in 1922.

== Range and habitat ==
Its native range is from Central Asia to China and the Himalayas. It is found in the regions of China (in Qinghai and Xinjiang), East and West Himalayas, Kyrgyzstan, Nepal, Tadzhikistan and Tibet.

It grows in sandstone gravel, on alpine meadows, steppe, scree and sandy slopes. They can be found at an altitude of 3,900–5,800 metres (12,800–19,000 ft) above sea level. Including on the semi-shrub deserts of the upper slopes of the Qinghai-Xizang Plateau, and the Tibetan Plateau.

== Other sources ==
- Sven Anders Hedin, Southern Tibet; Discoveries in Former Times Compared with My Own Researches in 1906-1908, Volume 6, Part 3
