= Sven Hedin =

Swedish geographer, explorer, photographer, and illustrator (1865–1952)

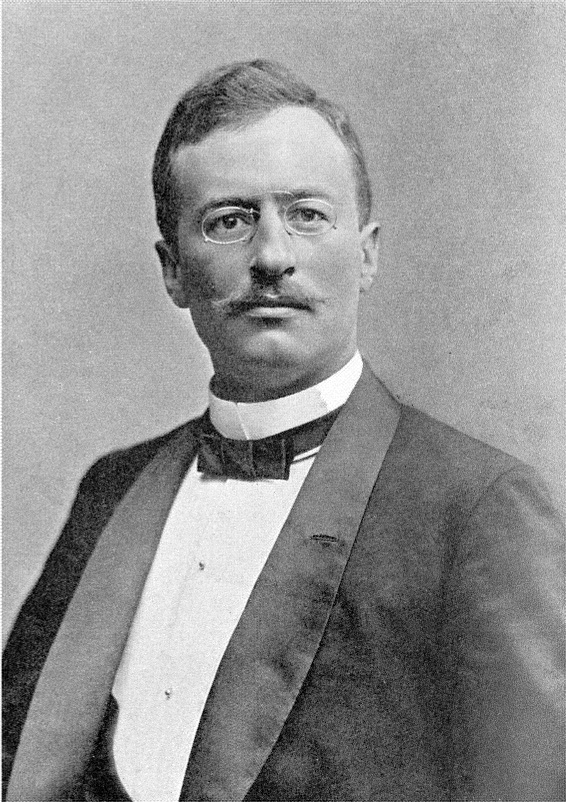
- Sven Hedin circa 1910
- Born: Sven Anders Hedin; 19 February 1865; Stockholm, Sweden
- Died: 26 November 1952 (aged 87); Stockholm, Sweden
- Writing career
- Language: Swedish
- Notable awards: Vega Medal (1898); Livingstone Medal (1902); Victoria Medal (1903)

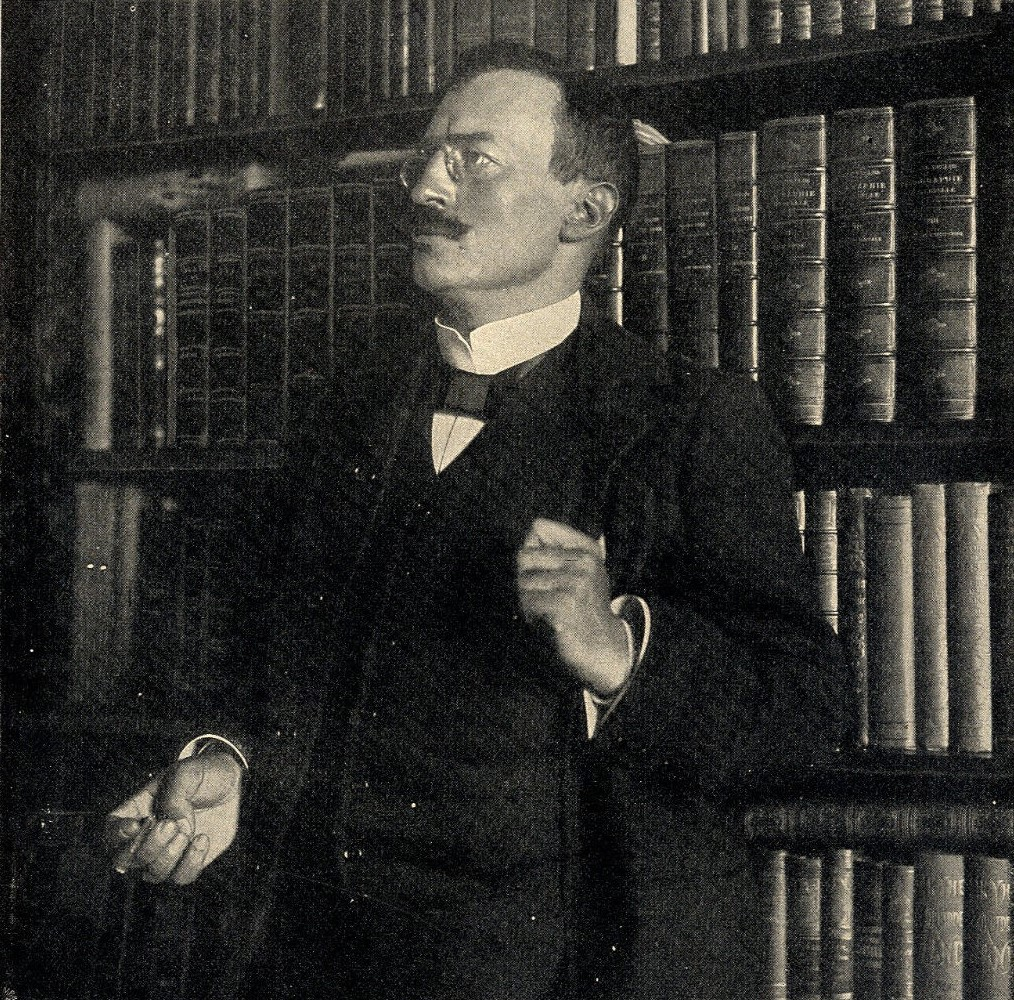
Dr. Sven Hedin at home in 1902

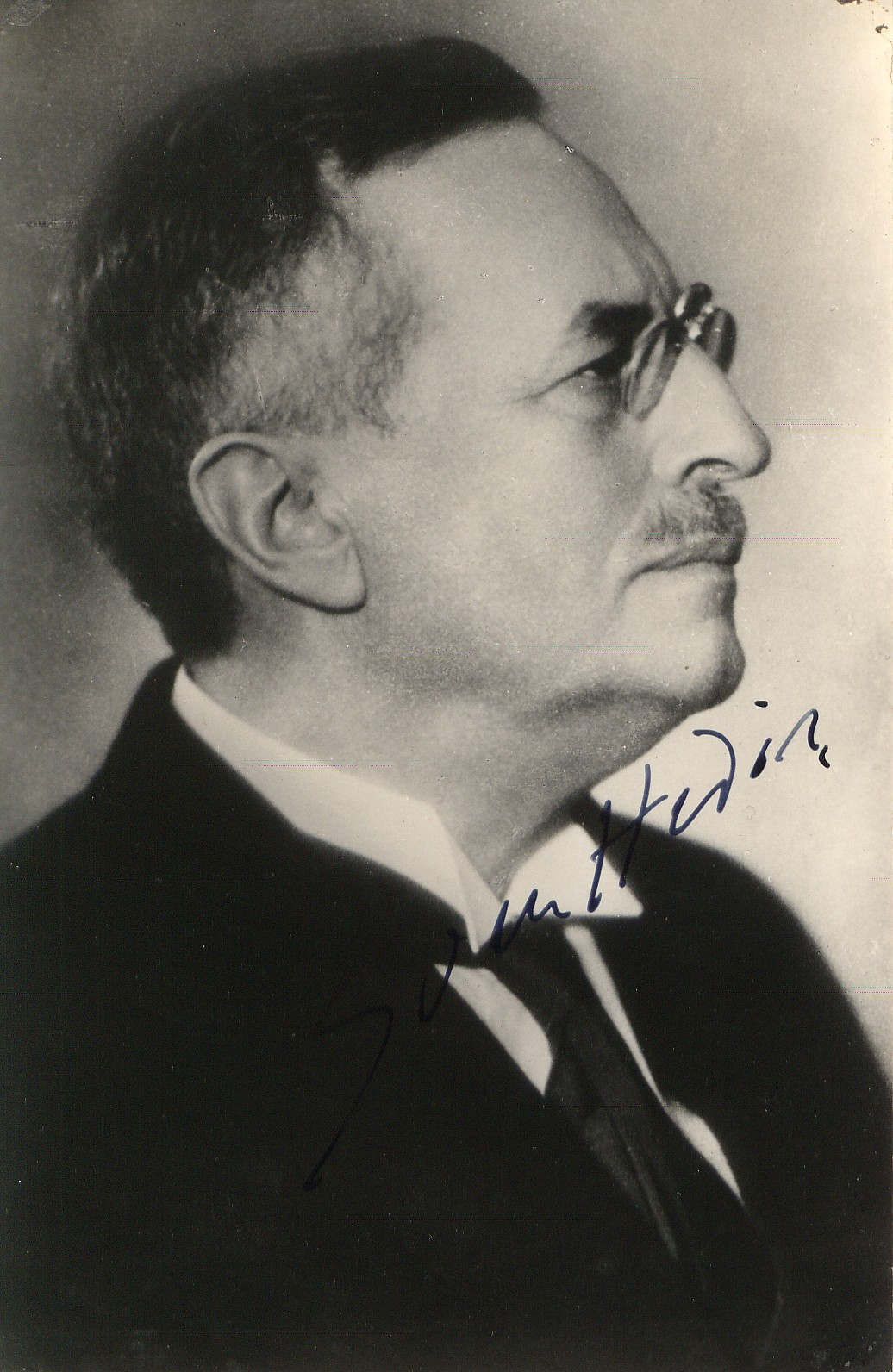
Sven Hedin signature on postcard to Johann Maria Farina 1935

Sven Anders Hedin, KNO1kl RVO, (19 February 1865 – 26 November 1952) was a Swedish geographer, topographer, explorer, photographer, travel writer and illustrator of his own works. During four expeditions to Central Asia, he made the Transhimalaya known in the West and located sources of the Brahmaputra, Indus and Sutlej Rivers. He also mapped lake Lop Nur, and the remains of cities, grave sites and the Great Wall of China in the deserts of the Tarim Basin. In his book Från pol till pol (From Pole to Pole), Hedin describes a journey through Asia and Europe between the late 1880s and the early 1900s. While traveling, Hedin visited Turkey, the Caucasus, Tehran, Iraq, lands of the Kyrgyz people and the Russian Far East, India, China and Japan. The posthumous publication of his Central Asia Atlas marked the conclusion of his life's work.

== Overview ==
At 15 years of age, Hedin witnessed the triumphal return of the Arctic explorer Adolf Erik Nordenskiöld after his first navigation of the Northern Sea Route. From that moment on, young Sven aspired to become an explorer. His studies under the German geographer and China expert, Ferdinand Freiherr von Richthofen, awakened a love of Germany in Hedin and strengthened his resolve to undertake expeditions to Central Asia to explore the last uncharted areas of Asia. After obtaining a doctorate, learning several languages and dialects, and undertaking two trips through Persia, he ignored the advice of Ferdinand von Richthofen to continue his geographic studies to acquaint himself with geographical research methodology; the result was that Hedin had to leave the evaluation of his expedition results later to other scientists.

Between 1894 and 1908, in three daring expeditions through the mountains and deserts of Central Asia, he mapped and researched parts of Chinese Turkestan (now Xinjiang) and Tibet which had been unexplored by Europeans until then. Upon his return to Stockholm in 1909 he was received as triumphantly as Adolf Erik Nordenskiöld. In 1902, he became the last Swede (to date) to be raised to the untitled nobility and was considered one of Sweden's most important personalities. As a member of two scientific academies, he had a voice in the selection of Nobel Prize winners for both science and literature. Hedin never married and had no children, rendering his family line now extinct.

Hedin's expedition notes laid the foundations for a precise mapping of Central Asia. He was one of the first European scientific explorers to employ indigenous scientists and research assistants on his expeditions. Although primarily an explorer, he was also the first to unearth the ruins of ancient Buddhist cities in Chinese Central Asia. However, as his main interest in archaeology was finding ancient cities, he had little interest in gathering data thorough scientific excavations. Of small stature, with a bookish, bespectacled appearance, Hedin nevertheless proved himself a determined explorer, surviving several close brushes with death from hostile forces and the elements over his long career. His scientific documentation and popular travelogues, illustrated with his own photographs, watercolor paintings and drawings, his adventure stories for young readers and his lecture tours abroad made him world-famous.

As an expert on Turkestan and Tibet, he obtained access to European and Asian monarchs, politicians, geographical societies, and scholarly associations. These figures and organizations exchanged gold medals, diamond-encrusted grand crosses, honorary doctorates, receptions, and logistical and financial support for his expeditions in return for his information on Central Asia. Hedin, along with Nikolai Przhevalsky, Sir Francis Younghusband, and Sir Aurel Stein, participated in the British-Russian competition for influence in Central Asia. Their travels received support because they mapped unrecorded areas, providing geographic information.

Hedin was honored in ceremonies in:

- 1890 by King Oscar II of Sweden
- 1890 by Shah Nāser ad-Dīn Schah
- 1896, 1909 by Czar Nicholas II of Russia
- from 1898 frequently by Kaiser Franz Joseph I of Austria-Hungary
- 1902 by the Viceroy of India Lord Curzon
- 1903, 1914, 1917, 1926, 1936 by Kaiser Wilhelm II
- 1906 by the Viceroy of India Lord Minto
- 1907, 1926, 1933 by the 9th Panchen Lama Thubten Choekyi Nyima
- 1908 by Emperor Mutsuhito
- 1910 by Pope Pius X
- 1910 by U.S. President Theodore Roosevelt
- 1915 and subsequently by Hindenburg
- 1929 and 1935 by Chiang Kai-shek
- 1935, 1939, 1940 (twice) by Adolf Hitler.

Hedin was, and remained, a figure of the 19th century who clung to its visions and methods also in the 20th century. This prevented him from discerning the fundamental social and political upheavals of the 20th century and aligning his thinking and actions accordingly.

Concerned about the security of Scandinavia, he favored the Swedish Navy's construction of the battleship Sverige. In World War I he specifically allied himself in his publications with the German Empire and its conduct of the war. Because of this political involvement, his scientific reputation was damaged among the Allied powers, along with his memberships in their geographical societies and learned associations, as well as any support for his planned expeditions.

After a less-than-successful lecture tour in 1923 through North America and Japan, he traveled on to Beijing to carry out an expedition to Chinese Turkestan (modern Xinjiang), but the region's unstable political situation thwarted this intention. He instead traveled through Mongolia by car and through Siberia aboard the Trans-Siberian Railway.

With financial support from the governments of Sweden and Germany, he led, between 1927 and 1935, an international and interdisciplinary Sino-Swedish Expedition to carry out scientific investigations in Mongolia and Chinese Turkestan, with the participation of 37 scientists from six countries. Despite Chinese counter-demonstrations and after months of negotiations in the Republic of China, was he able to make the expedition also a Chinese one by obtaining Chinese research commissions and the participation of Chinese scientists. He also concluded a contract which guaranteed freedom of travel for this expedition which, because of its arms, 300 camels, and activities in a war theater, resembled an invading army. However, the financing remained Hedin's private responsibility.

Because of failing health, the civil war in Chinese Turkestan, and a long period of captivity, Hedin, by then 70 years of age, had a difficult time after the currency depreciation of the Great Depression raising the money required for the expedition, the logistics for assuring the supplying of the expedition in an active war zone, and obtaining access for the expedition's participants to a research area intensely contested by local warlords. Nevertheless, the expedition was a scientific success. The archaeological artifacts which had been sent to Sweden were scientifically assessed for three years (or four years according to Chung-Chang Shen (C.C. Shen), who was the administrative officer for the Sino-Swedish Expedition Council, and drafted the contract), after which they were returned to China under the terms of the contract.

Starting in 1937, the scientific material assembled during the expedition was published in over 50 volumes by Hedin and other expedition participants, thereby making it available for worldwide research on eastern Asia. When he ran out of money to pay printing costs, he pawned his extensive and valuable library, which filled several rooms, making possible the publication of additional volumes.

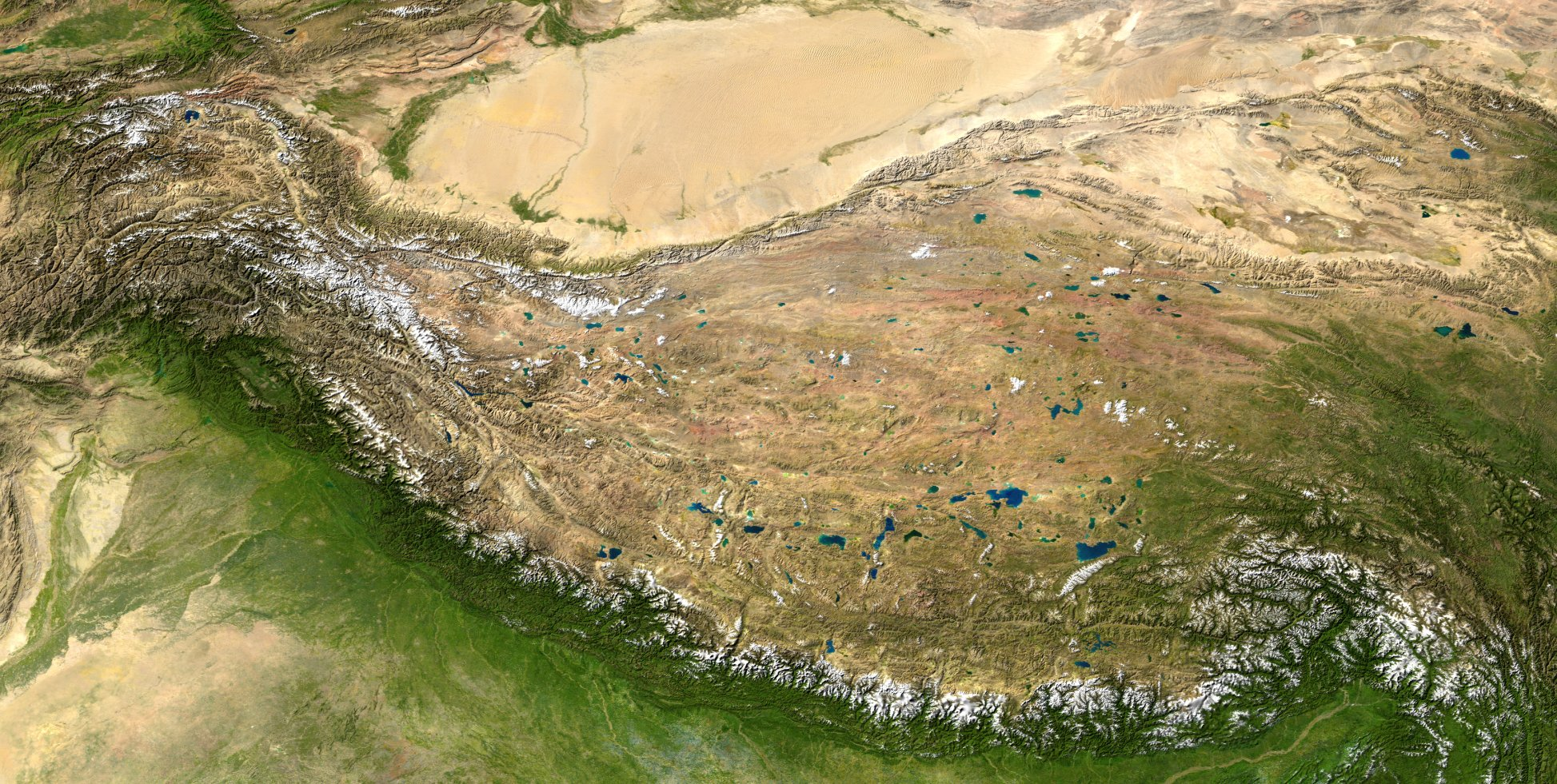
A view of the entire area of Central Asia opened up for cartography and research by Hedin in his expeditions. Below the Himalaya and Transhimalaya ranges, in the middle the Tibetan Plateau, above which is the Pamir Mountain range with the Tarim Basin and the Taklamakan Desert alongside.

In 1935, Hedin made his exclusive knowledge about Central Asia available, not only to the Swedish government, but also to foreign governments such as China and Germany, in lectures and personal discussions with political representatives of Chiang Kai-shek and Adolf Hitler.

Although he was not a National Socialist, Hedin's hope that Nazi Germany would protect Scandinavia from invasion by the Soviet Union, brought him in dangerous proximity to representatives of National Socialism, who exploited him as an author. This destroyed his reputation and put him into social and scientific isolation. However, in correspondence and personal conversations with leading Nazis, his successful intercessions achieved the pardoning of ten people condemned to death and the release or survival of Jews who had been deported to Nazi concentration camps.

At the end of the war, United States Army troops confiscated documents relating to Hedin's planned Central Asia Atlas. The U.S. Army Map Service later solicited Hedin's assistance and financed the printing and publication of his life's work, the Central Asia Atlas. Whoever compares this atlas with Adolf Stielers Hand Atlas of 1891 can appreciate what Hedin accomplished between 1893 and 1935.

Although Hedin's research was taboo in Germany and Sweden because of his conduct relating to Nazi Germany, and stagnated for decades in Germany, the scientific documentation of his expeditions was translated into Chinese by the Chinese Academy of Social Sciences and incorporated into Chinese research. Following recommendations made by Hedin to the Chinese Nationalist government in 1935, the routes he selected were used to construct streets and train tracks, as well as dams and canals to irrigate new farms being established in the Tarim and Yanji basins in Xinjiang and the deposits of iron, manganese, oil, coal and gold discovered during the Sino-Swedish Expedition were opened up for mining. Among the discoveries of this expedition should also be counted the many Asian plants and animals unheard of until that date, as well as fossil remains of dinosaurs and other extinct animals. Many were named after Hedin, the species-level scientific classification being hedini. But one discovery remained unknown to Chinese researchers until the turn of the millennium: in the Lop Nur desert, Hedin discovered in 1933 and 1934 ruins of signal towers which prove that the Great Wall of China once extended as far west as Xinjiang.

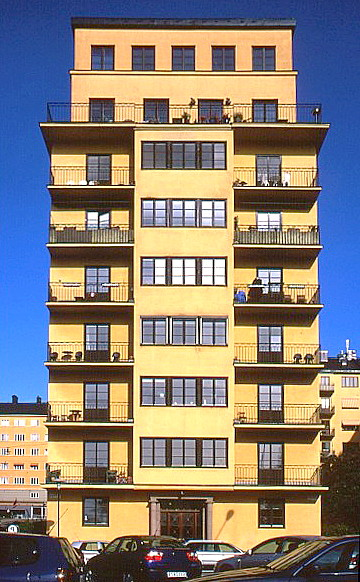
Hedin lived with family members in the upper three stories of this house in Stockholm, Norr Mälarstrand 66, from 1935 until his death in 1952

From 1931 until his death in 1952, Hedin lived in Stockholm in a modern high-rise in a preferred location, the address being Norr Mälarstrand 66. He lived with his siblings in the upper three stories and from the balcony he had a wide view over Riddarfjärden Bay and Lake Mälaren to the island of Långholmen. In the entryway to the stairwell is to be found a decorative stucco relief map of Hedin's research area in Central Asia and a relief of the Lama temple, a copy of which he had brought to Chicago for the 1933 World's Fair.

On 29 October 1952, Hedin's will granted the rights to his books and his extensive personal effects to the Royal Swedish Academy of Sciences; the Sven Hedin Foundation established soon thereafter holds all the rights of ownership.

Hedin died at Stockholm in 1952. The memorial service was attended by representatives of the Swedish royal household, the Swedish government, the Swedish Academy, and the diplomatic service. He is buried in the cemetery of Adolf Fredrik church in Stockholm.

== Biography ==
=== Childhood influences ===
Sven Hedin was born in Stockholm, the son of Ludwig Hedin, Chief Architect of Stockholm. When he was 15 years old Hedin witnessed the triumphal return of the Swedish Arctic explorer Adolf Erik Nordenskiöld after his first navigation of the Northern Sea Route.

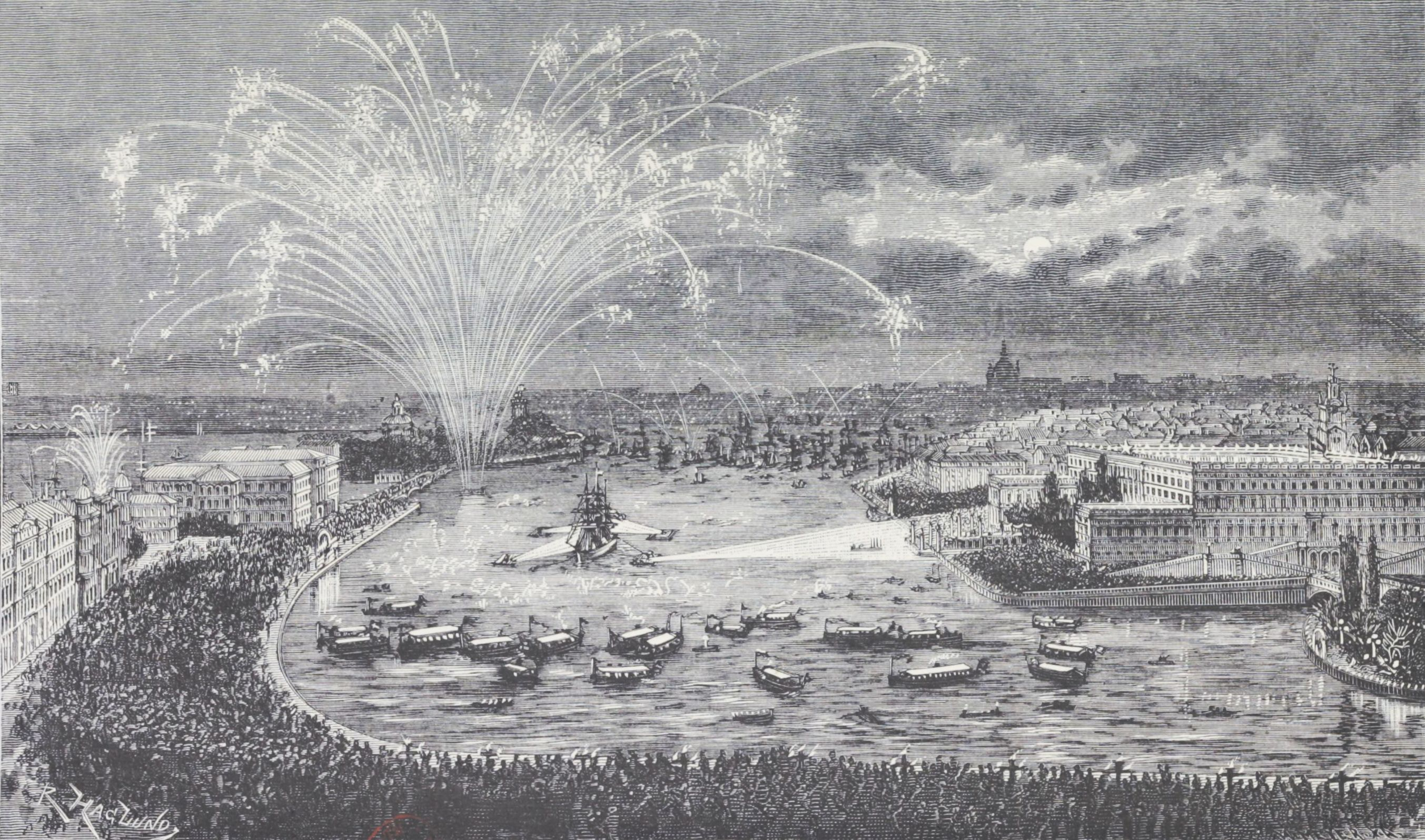
Stockholm on 24 April 1880

He describes this experience in his book My Life as an Explorer as follows:

On 24 April 1880, the steamer Vega sailed into Stockholms ström. The entire city was illuminated. The buildings around the harbor glowed in the light of innumerable lamps and torches. Gas flames depicted the constellation of Vega on the castle. Amidst this sea of light the famous ship glided into the harbor. I was standing on the Södermalm heights with my parents and siblings, from which we had a superb view. I was gripped by great nervous tension. I will remember this day until I die, as it was decisive for my future. Thunderous jubilation resounded from quays, streets, windows and rooftops. "That is how I want to return home some day," I thought to myself.

=== First trip to Iran (Persia) ===
In May 1885, Hedin graduated from Beskowska secondary school in Stockholm. He then accepted an offer to accompany the student Erhard Sandgren as his private tutor to Baku, where Sandgren's father was working as an engineer in the oil fields of Robert Nobel. Afterward he attended a course in topography for general staff officers for one month in summer 1885 and took a few weeks of instruction in portrait drawing; this comprised his entire training in those areas.

On 15 August 1885, he traveled to Baku with Erhard Sandgren and instructed him there for seven months, and he himself began to learn the Latin, French, German, Persian, Russian, English and Tatar languages. He later learned several Persian dialects as well as Turkish, Kyrgyz, Mongolian, Tibetan and some Chinese.

On 6 April 1886, Hedin left Baku for Iran (then called Persia), traveling by paddle steamer over the Caspian Sea, riding through the Alborz Range to Tehran, Esfahan, Shiraz and the harbor city of Bushehr. From there he took a ship up the Tigris River to Baghdad (then in Ottoman Empire), returning to Tehran via Kermanshah, and then travelling through the Caucasus and over the Black Sea to Constantinople. Hedin then returned to Sweden, arriving on 18 September 1886.

In 1887, Hedin published a book about these travels entitled Through Persia, Mesopotamia and the Caucasus.

=== Studies ===
From 1886 to 1888, Hedin studied under the geologist Waldemar Brøgger in Stockholm and Uppsala the subjects of geology, mineralogy, zoology and Latin. In December 1888, he became a Candidate in Philosophy. From October 1889 to March 1890 he studied in Berlin under Ferdinand Freiherr von Richthofen.

=== Second trip to Iran ===
On 12 May 1890, he accompanied as interpreter and vice-consul a Swedish legation to Iran which was to present the Shah of Iran with the insignia of the Order of the Seraphim. As part of the Swedish legation, he was at an audience of the shah Naser al-Din Shah Qajar in Tehran. He spoke with him and later accompanied him to the Elburz Mountain Range. On 11 July 1890, he and three others climbed Mount Damavand where he collected primary material for his dissertation. Starting in September he traveled on the Silk Road via cities Mashhad, Ashgabat, Bukhara, Samarkand, Tashkent and Kashgar to the western outskirts of the Taklamakan Desert. On the trip home, he visited the grave of the Russian Asian scholar, Nikolai Przhevalsky in Karakol on the shore of Lake Issyk Kul. On 29 March 1891, he was back in Stockholm. He published the books King Oscar's Legation to the Shah of Persia in 1890 and Through Chorasan and Turkestan about this journey.

=== Doctorate and career path ===
On 27 April 1892, Hedin traveled to Berlin to continue his studies under Ferdinand Freiherr von Richthofen. Beginning of July he went to the University of Halle-Wittenberg, Halle, attending lectures by Alfred Kirchhoff. Yet in the same month, he received the degree of Doctor of Philosophy with a 28-page dissertation entitled Personal Observations of Damavand. This dissertation is a summary of one part of his book, King Oscar's Legation to the Shah of Persia in 1890. Eric Wennerholm remarked on the subject:

I can only come to the conclusion that Sven [Hedin] received his doctorate when he was 27 years old after studying for a grand total of only eight months and collecting primary material for one-and-a-half days on the snow-clad peak of Mount Damavand.

Ferdinand Freiherr von Richthofen not only encouraged Hedin to absolve cursory studies, but also to become thoroughly acquainted with all branches of geographic science and the methodologies of the salient research work, so that he could later work as an explorer. Hedin abstained from doing this with an explanation he supplied in old age:

I was not up to this challenge. I had gotten out onto the wild routes of Asia too early, I had perceived too much of the splendor and magnificence of the Orient, the silence of the deserts and the loneliness of long journeys. I could not get used to the idea of spending a long period of time back in school.

Hedin had therewith decided to become an explorer. He was attracted to the idea of traveling to the last mysterious portions of Asia and filling in the gaps by mapping an area completely unknown in Europe. As an explorer, Hedin became important for the Asian and European powers, who courted him, invited him to give numerous lectures, and hoped to obtain from him in return topographic, economic and strategic information about inner Asia, which they considered part of their sphere of influence. As the era of discovery came to a close around 1920, Hedin contented himself with organizing the Sino-Swedish Expedition for qualified scientific explorers.

=== First expedition ===
Between 1893 and 1897, Hedin investigated the Pamir Mountains, travelling through the Tarim Basin in Xinjiang region, across the Taklamakan Desert, Lake Kara-Koshun and Lake Bosten, proceeding to study northern Tibet. He covered 26,000 kilometres (16,000 mi) on this journey and mapped 10,498 kilometres (6,523 mi) of them on 552 sheets. Approximately 3,600 kilometres (2,200 mi) led through previously uncharted areas.

He started out on this expedition on 16 October 1893, from Stockholm, traveling via Saint Petersburg and Tashkent to the Pamir Mountains. Several attempts to climb the 7,546 metres (24,757 ft) high Muztagata—called the Father of the Glaciers—in the Pamir Mountains were unsuccessful. He remained in Kashgar until April 1895 and then left on 10 April with three local escorts from the village of Merket to cross the Taklamakan Desert via Tusluk to the Khotan River. Since their water supply was insufficient, seven camels died of thirst, as did two of his escorts (according to Hedin's dramatized and probably inaccurate account). Bruno Baumann traveled on this route in April 2000 with a camel caravan and ascertained that at least one of the escorts who, according to Hedin, had died of thirst had survived, and that it is impossible for a camel caravan traveling in springtime on this route to carry enough drinking water for both camels and travelers.

According to other sources, Hedin had neglected to completely fill the drinking water containers for his caravan at the beginning of the expedition and set out for the desert with only half as much water as could actually be carried. When he noticed the mistake, it was too late to return. Obsessed by his urge to carry out his research, Hedin deserted the caravan and proceeded alone on horseback with his servant. When that escort also collapsed from thirst, Hedin left him behind as well, but managed to reach a water source at the last desperate moment. He did, however, return to his servant with water and rescued him. Nevertheless, his ruthless behavior earned him massive criticism.

In January 1896, after a stopover in Kashgar, Hedin visited the 1,500-year-old abandoned cities of Dandan Oilik and Kara Dung, which are located northeast of Khotan in the Taklamakan Desert. At the beginning of March, he discovered Lake Bosten, one of the largest inland bodies of water in Central Asia. He reported that this lake is supplied by a single mighty feeder stream, the Kaidu River. He mapped Lake Kara-Koshun and returned on 27 May to Khotan. On 29 June, he started out from there with his caravan across northern Tibet and China to Beijing, where he arrived on 2 March 1897. He returned to Stockholm via Mongolia and Russia.

=== Second expedition ===
Another expedition in Central Asia followed in 1899–1902 through the Tarim Basin, Tibet and Kashmir to Calcutta. Hedin navigated the Yarkand, Tarim and Kaidu rivers and found the dry riverbed of the Kum-darja as well as the dried out lake bed of Lop Nur. Near Lop Nur, he discovered the ruins of the 340 by 310 metres (1,120 by 1,020 ft) former walled royal city and later Chinese garrison town of Loulan, containing the brick building of the Imperial Chinese Army commander, a stupa, and 19 dwellings built of poplar wood. He also found a wooden wheel from a horse-drawn cart (called an arabas) as well as several hundred documents written on wood, paper and silk in the Kharosthi script. These provided information about the history of the city of Loulan, which had once been located on the shores of Lop Nur but had been abandoned around the year 330 CE because the lake had dried out, depriving the inhabitants of drinking water.

During his travels in 1900 and 1901 he attempted in vain to reach the city of Lhasa, which was forbidden to Europeans. He continued to Leh, in Ladakh district, India. From Leh, Hedin's route took him to Lahore, Delhi, Agra, Lucknow, Benares to Calcutta, meeting there with George Nathaniel Curzon, England's then Viceroy to India.

This expedition resulted in 1,149 pages of maps, on which Hedin depicted newly discovered lands. He was the first to describe yardang formations in the Lop Desert.

=== Third expedition ===
Between 1905 and 1908, Hedin investigated the Central Iranian desert basins, the western highlands of Tibet and the Transhimalaya, which for a time was afterward called the Hedin Range. He visited the 9th Panchen Lama in the cloistered city of Tashilhunpo in Shigatse. Hedin was the first European to reach the Kailash region, including the sacred Lake Manasarovar and Mount Kailash, the midpoint of the earth according to Buddhist and Hindu mythology. The most important goal of the expedition was the search for the sources of the Indus and Brahmaputra Rivers, both of which Hedin found. From India, he returned via Japan and Russia to Stockholm.

He returned from this expedition with a collection of geological samples which are kept and studied in the Bavarian State Collection of Paleontology and Geology of the Ludwig-Maximilians-Universität München. These sedimentary rocks—such as breccia, conglomerate, limestone, and slate, as well as volcanic rock and granite—highlight the geological diversity of the regions visited by Hedin during this expedition.

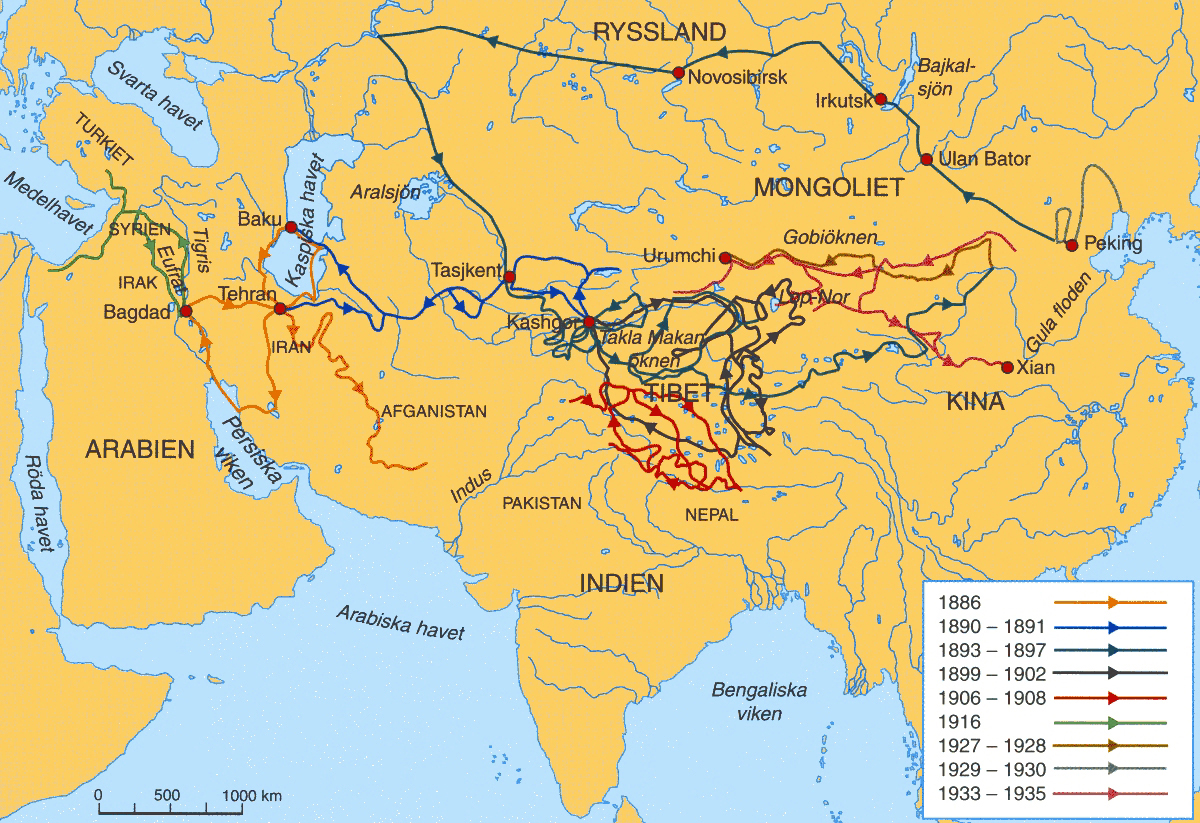
The explorations of Hedin 1886–1935. The routes of his colleagues during the Sino-Swedish Expedition of 1927–1935 are not included.

=== Mongolia ===
In 1923, Hedin traveled to Beijing via the United States—where he visited the Grand Canyon—and the Empire of Japan. Because of political and social unrest in China, he had to abandon an expedition to Xinjiang. Instead, he traveled with Frans August Larson (called the "Duke of Mongolia") in November and December in a Dodge automobile from Peking through Mongolia via Ulaanbaatar to Ulan-Ude, Russia and from there on the Trans-Siberian Railway to Moscow.

=== Fourth expedition ===
Between 1927 and 1935, Hedin led an international Sino-Swedish Expedition which investigated the meteorological, topographic and prehistoric situation in Mongolia, the Gobi Desert and Xinjiang.

Hedin described it as a peripatetic university in which the participating scientists worked almost independently, while he—like a local manager—negotiated with local authorities, made decisions, organized whatever was necessary, raised funds and recorded the route followed. He gave archaeologists, astronomers, botanists, geographers, geologists, meteorologists and zoologists from Sweden, Germany and China an opportunity to participate in the expedition and carry out research in their areas of specialty.

Hedin met Chiang Kai-shek in Nanjing, who thereupon became a patron of the expedition. The Sino-Swedish Expedition was honored with a Chinese postage stamp series which had a print run of 25,000. The four stamps show camels at a camp with the expedition flag and bear the Chinese text, "Postal Service of the Prosperous Middle Kingdom" and in Latin underneath, "Scientific Expedition to the Northwestern Province of China 1927–1933". A painting in the Beijing Palace Museum entitled Nomads in the Desert served as model for the series. Of the 25,000 sets, 4,000 were sold across the counter and 21,500 came into the possession of the expedition. Hedin used them to finance the expedition, selling them for a price of five dollars per set. The stamps were unwelcome at the time due to the high price Hedin was selling them at, but years later became valuable treasures among collectors.

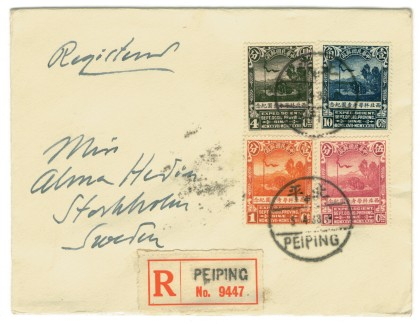
Envelope of a letter from Hedin to his sister Alma with Chinese stamps issued on the occasion of the Sino-Swedish Expedition

The first part of the expedition, from 1927 to 1932, led from Beijing via Baotou to Mongolia, over the Gobi Desert, through Xinjiang to Ürümqi, and into the northern and eastern parts of the Tarim Basin. The expedition had a wealth of scientific results which are being published up to the present time. For example, the discovery of specific deposits of iron, manganese, oil, coal and gold reserves was of great economic relevance for China. In recognition of his achievements, the Berlin Geographical Society presented him with the Ferdinand von Richthofen Medal in 1933; the same honor was also awarded to Erich von Drygalski for his Gauss Expedition to the Antarctic; and to Alfred Philippson for his research on the Aegean Region.

From the end of 1933 to 1934, Hedin led—on behalf of the Kuomintang government under Chiang Kai-shek in Nanjing—a Chinese expedition to investigate irrigation measures and draw up plans and maps for the construction of two roads suitable for automobiles along the Silk Road from Beijing to Xinjiang. Following his plans, major irrigation facilities were constructed, settlements erected, and roads built on the Silk Road from Beijing to Kashgar, which made it possible to completely bypass the rough terrain of Tarim Basin.

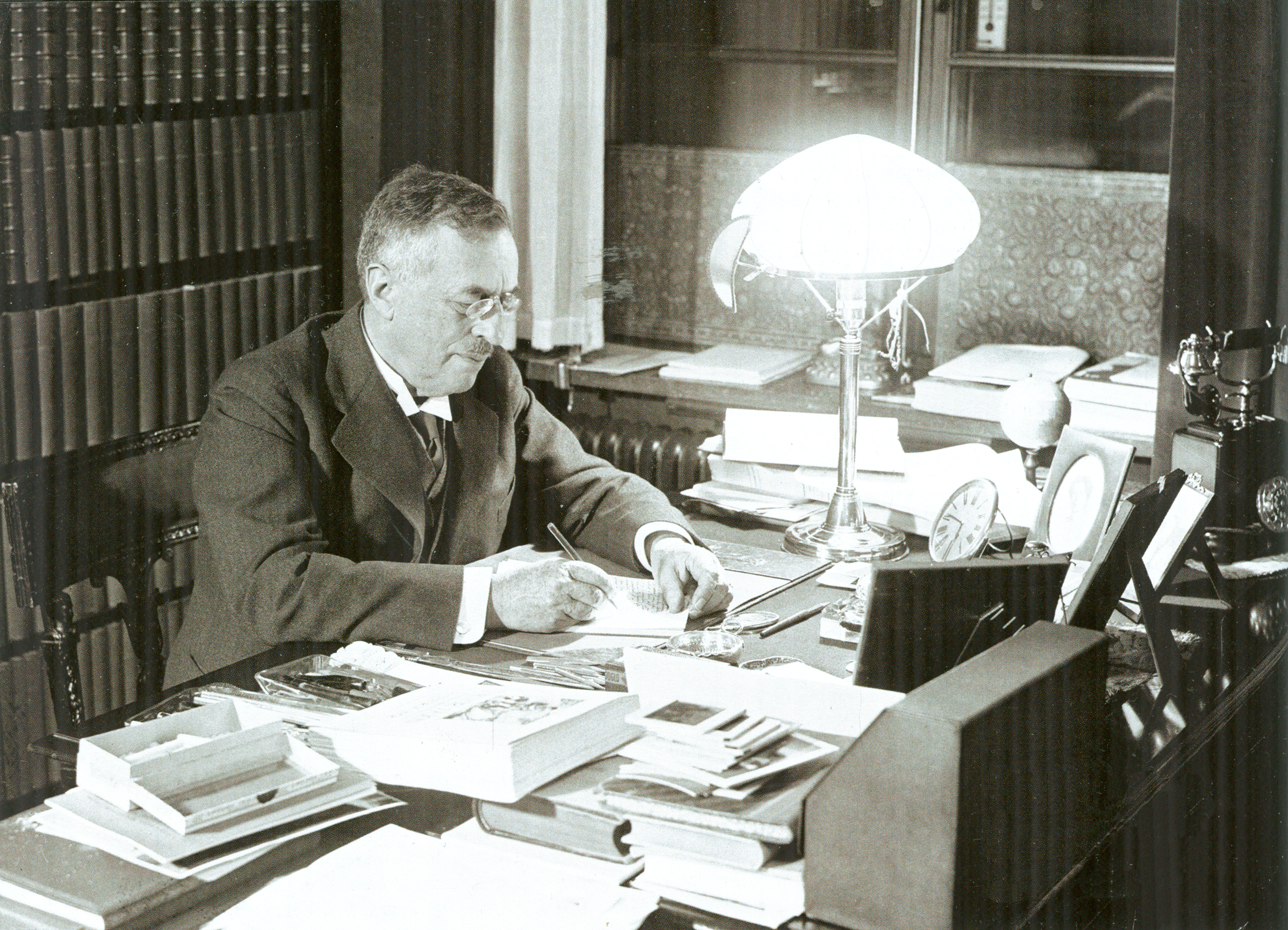
Sven Hedin at his desk in 1935

One aspect of the geography of central Asia which intensively occupied Hedin for decades was what he called the "wandering lake" Lop Nur. In May 1934, he began a river expedition to this lake. For two months he navigated the Kaidu River and the Kum-Darja to Lop Nur, which had been filled with water since 1921. After the lake dried out in 1971 as a consequence of irrigation activities, the above-mentioned transportation link enabled the People's Republic of China to construct a nuclear weapon test site at Lop Nur.

His caravan of truck lorries was hijacked by the Chinese Muslim General Ma Zhongying who was retreating from northern Xinjiang along with his Kuomintang 36th Division (National Revolutionary Army) from the Soviet Invasion of Xinjiang. While Hedin was detained by Ma Zhongying, he met General Ma Hushan, and Kemal Kaya Effendi.

Ma Zhongying's adjutant claimed to Hedin that Ma Zhongying had the entire region of Tian-shan-nan-lu (southern Xinjiang) under his control and Sven could pass through safely without any trouble. Hedin did not believe his assertions. Some of Ma Zhongying's Tungan (Chinese speaking Muslim) troops attacked Hedin's expedition by shooting at their vehicles.

For the return trip, Hedin selected the southern Silk Road route via Hotan to Xi'an, where the expedition arrived on 7 February 1935. He continued on to Beijing to meet with President Lin Sen and to Nanjing to Chiang Kai-shek. He celebrated his 70th birthday on 19 February 1935 in the presence of 250 members of the Kuomintang government, to whom he reported interesting facts about the Sino-Swedish Expedition. On this day, he was awarded the Brilliant Jade Order, Second Class.

At the end of the expedition, Hedin was in a difficult financial situation. He had considerable debts at the German-Asian Bank in Beijing, which he repaid with the royalties and fees received for his books and lectures. In the months after his return, he held 111 lectures in 91 German cities as well as 19 lectures in neighboring countries. To accomplish this lecture tour, he covered a stretch as long as the equator, 23,000 kilometres (14,000 mi) by train and 17,000 kilometres (11,000 mi) by car—in a time period of five months. He met Adolf Hitler in Berlin before his lecture on 14 April 1935.

== Political views ==
Hedin was a monarchist. From 1905 onwards he took a stand against the move toward democracy in his Swedish homeland. He warned of the dangers he assumed to be coming from Czarist Russia, and called for an alliance with the German Empire. Therefore, he advocated a strengthened national defence, with a vigilant military preparedness. August Strindberg was one of his opponents on this issue, which divided Swedish politics at the time. In 1912 Hedin publicly supported the Swedish coastal defense ship Society. He helped collect public donations for the building of the coastal defense ship HSwMS Sverige, which the Liberal and anti-militarist government of Karl Staaff had been unwilling to finance. In early 1914, when the Liberal government enacted cutbacks to the country's defenses, Hedin wrote the Courtyard Speech, in which King Gustaf V promised to strengthen the country's defenses. The speech led to a political crisis that ended with Staaff and his government resigning and being replaced by a non-party, more conservative government.

He developed a lasting affinity for the German empire, with which he became acquainted during his formal studies. This is also shown in his admiration for Kaiser Wilhelm II, whom he even visited in exile in the Netherlands. Influenced by imperial Russian and later the Soviet union's attempts to dominate and control territories outside its borders, especially in Central Asia and Turkestan, Hedin felt that Soviet Russia posed a great threat to the West, which may be part of the reason why he supported Germany during both World Wars.

He viewed World War I as a struggle of the German race (particularly against Russia) and took sides in books like Ein Volk in Waffen. Den deutschen Soldaten gewidmet (A People in Arms. Dedicated to the German Soldier). As a consequence, he lost friends in France and England and was expelled from the British Royal Geographical Society, and from the Imperial Russian Geographical Society. Germany's defeat in World War I and the associated loss of its international reputation affected him deeply. That Sweden gave asylum to Wolfgang Kapp as a political refugee after the failure of the Kapp Putsch is said to be primarily attributable to his efforts.

== Hedin and Nazi Germany ==
Hedin's conservative and pro-German views eventually translated into sympathy for the Third Reich, and this would draw him into increasing controversy towards the end of his life. Adolf Hitler had been an early admirer of Hedin, who was in turn impressed with Hitler's nationalism. He saw the German leader's rise to power as a revival of German fortunes, and welcomed its challenge against Soviet Communism. He was not an entirely uncritical supporter of the Nazis, however. His own views were shaped by traditionalist, Christian and conservative values, while National Socialism was in part a modern revolutionary-populist movement. Hedin objected to some aspects of National Socialist rule, and occasionally attempted to convince the German government to relent in its anti-religious and anti-Semitic campaigns.

Hedin met Adolf Hitler and other leading Nazi Party leaders repeatedly and was in regular correspondence with them. The politely-worded correspondence usually concerned scheduling matters, birthday congratulations, Hedin's planned or completed publications, and requests by Hedin for pardons for people condemned to death, and for mercy, release and permission to leave the country for people interned in prisons or concentration camps. In correspondence with Joseph Goebbels and Hans Dräger, Hedin was able to achieve the printing of the Daily Watchwords year after year. Hedin directly interviewed Hitler in October 1939, one month after the invasion of Poland, where Hitler claimed that there could be peace if the United Kingdom and France recognized the German occupation of Czechoslovakia.

On 29 October 1942, Hitler read Hedin's book entitled, America in the Battle of the Continents. In the book Hedin promoted the view that President Franklin D. Roosevelt was responsible for the outbreak of war in 1939 and that Hitler had done everything in his power to prevent war. Moreover, Hedin argued that the origins of the Second World War lay not in German belligerence but in the Treaty of Versailles. This book deeply influenced Hitler and reaffirmed his views on the origins of the war and who was responsible for it. In a letter to Hedin the following day Hitler wrote, "I thank you warmly for the attention you have shown me. I have already read the book and welcome in particular that you so explicitly detailed the offers I made to Poland at the beginning of the War". Hitler continued, "without question, the individual guilty of this war, as you correctly state at the end of your book, is exclusively the American President Roosevelt."

The Nazis attempted to achieve a close connection to Hedin by bestowing awards upon him—later scholars have noted that "honors were heaped upon this prominent sympathizer." They asked him to present an address on Sport as a Teacher at the 1936 Summer Olympics in Berlin's Olympic Stadium. They made him an honorary member of the German-Swedish Union Berlin (German: Deutsch-Schwedische Vereinigung Berlin e.V.) In 1938, they presented him with the City of Berlin's Badge of Honor (German: Ehrenplakette der Stadt Berlin). For his 75th birthday on 19 February 1940 they awarded him the Order of the German Eagle; shortly before that date it had been presented to Henry Ford and Charles Lindbergh. On New Year's Day 1943 they released the Oslo professor of philology and university rector Didrik Arup Seip from the Sachsenhausen concentration camp at Hedin's request to obtain Hedin's agreement to accept additional honors during the 470th anniversary of the Ludwig-Maximilians-Universität München. On 15 January 1943, he received the Gold Medal of the Bavarian Academy of Sciences (Goldmedaille der Bayerischen Akademie der Wissenschaften). On 16 January 1943 he received an honorary doctorate from the faculty of natural sciences of the Ludwig-Maximilians-Universität München. On the same day, the Nazis founded in his absence the Sven Hedin Institute for Inner Asian Research located at Mittersill Castle, which was supposed to serve the long-term advancement of the scientific legacy of Hedin and Wilhelm Filchner as Asian experts. However, it was instead misused by Heinrich Himmler as an institute of the Research Association for German Genealogical Inheritance (Forschungsgemeinschaft Deutsches Ahnenerbe e.V.). On 21 January 1943, he was requested to sign the Golden Book of the city of Munich.

Hedin supported the Nazis in his journalistic activities. After the collapse of Nazi Germany, he did not regret his collaboration with the Nazis because this cooperation had made it possible to rescue numerous Nazi victims from execution, or death in extermination camps.

Senior Jewish German archeologist Werner Scheimberg, sent in the expedition by the Thule Society, "had been one of the companions of the Swedish explorer Sven Hedin on his excursions in the East, with archaeological and to some extent esoteric purposes".

Hedin was trying to discover the mythological place of Agartha and reproached the Polish explorer and visiting professor Antoni Ossendowski for having been gone where the Swedish explorer wasn't able to come, and thus was personally invited by Adolf Hitler in Berlin and honoured by the Führer during his 75th birthday feast.

=== Criticism of National Socialism ===
Johannes Paul wrote in 1954 about Hedin:

Much of what happened in the early days of Nazi rule had his approval. However, he did not hesitate to criticize whenever he considered this to be necessary, particularly in cases of Jewish persecution, conflict with the churches and bars to freedom of science.

In 1937 Hedin refused to publish his book Deutschland und der Weltfrieden (Germany and World Peace) in Germany because the Reich Ministry for Public Enlightenment and Propaganda insisted on the deletion of Nazi-critical passages. In a letter Hedin wrote to State Secretary Walther Funk dated 16 April 1937, it becomes clear what his criticism of National Socialism was in this time before the establishment of extermination camps:

When we first discussed my plan to write a book, I stated that I only wanted to write objectively, scientifically, possibly critically, according to my conscience, and you considered that to be completely acceptable and natural. Now I emphasized in a very friendly and mild form that the removal of distinguished Jewish professors who have performed great services for mankind is detrimental to Germany and that this has given rise to many agitators against Germany abroad. So I took this position only in the interest of Germany.

My worry that the education of German youth, which I otherwise praise and admire everywhere, is deficient in questions of religion and the hereafter comes from my love and sympathy for the German nation, and as a Christian I consider it my duty to state this openly, and, to be sure, in the firm conviction that Luther’s nation, which is religious through and through, will understand me.

So far I have never gone against my conscience and will not do it now either. Therefore, no deletions will be made.

Hedin later published this book in Sweden.

=== Efforts on behalf of deported Jews ===
After he refused to remove his criticism of National Socialism from his book Deutschland und der Weltfrieden, the Nazis confiscated the passports of Hedin's Jewish friend Alfred Philippson and his family in 1938 to prevent their intended departure to American exile and retain them in Germany as a bargaining chip when dealing with Hedin. The consequence was that Hedin expressed himself more favorably about Nazi Germany in his book Fünfzig Jahre Deutschland, subjugated himself against his conscience to the censorship of the Reich Ministry of Public Enlightenment and Propaganda, and published the book in Germany.

On 8 June 1942, the Nazis increased the pressure on Hedin by deporting Alfred Philippson and his family to the Theresienstadt concentration camp. By doing so, they accomplished their goal of forcing Hedin against his conscience to write his book Amerika im Kampf der Kontinente in collaboration with the Ministry of Public Enlightenment and Propaganda and other government agencies and to publish it in Germany in 1942. In return, the Nazis classified Alfred Philippson as "A-prominent" and granted his family privileges which enabled them to survive.

For a long time Hedin was in correspondence with Alfred Philippson and regularly sent food parcels to him in Theresienstadt concentration camp. On 29 May 1946, Alfred Philippson wrote to him (translation, abbreviated quotation):

My dear Hedin! Now that letters can be sent abroad I have the opportunity to write to you…. We frequently think with deep gratitude of our rescuer, who alone is responsible for our being able to survive the horrible period of three years of incarceration and hunger in Theresienstadt concentration camp, at my age a veritable wonder. You will have learned that we few survivors were finally liberated just a few days before our intended gassing. We, my wife, daughter and I, were then brought on 9–10 July 1945 in a bus of the city of Bonn here to our home town, almost half of which is now destroyed….

Hedin responded on 19 July 1946 (translation, abbreviated quotation):

…It was wonderful to find out that our efforts were not in vain. In these difficult years we attempted to rescue over one hundred other unfortunate people who had been deported to Poland, but in most cases without success. We were however able to help a few Norwegians. My home in Stockholm was turned into something like an information and assistance office, and I was excellently supported by Dr. Paul Grassmann, press attaché in the German embassy in Stockholm. He too undertook everything possible to further this humanitarian work. But almost no case was as fortunate as yours, dear friend! And how wonderful, that you are back in Bonn….

The names and fates of the over one hundred deported Jews whom Hedin tried to save have not yet been researched.

=== Efforts on behalf of deported Norwegians ===
Hedin supported the cause of the Norwegian author Arnulf Øverland and for the Oslo professor of philology and university director Didrik Arup Seip, who were interned in the Sachsenhausen concentration camp. He achieved the release of Didrik Arup Seip, but his efforts to free Arnulf Øverland were unsuccessful. Nevertheless, Arnulf Øverland survived the concentration camp.

=== Efforts on behalf of Norwegian activists ===
After the third senate of the highest German military court (Reichskriegsgericht) in Berlin condemned to death for alleged espionage the ten Norwegians Sigurd Jakobsen, Gunnar Hellesen, Helge Børseth, Siegmund Brommeland, Peter Andree Hjelmervik, Siegmund Rasmussen, Gunnar Carlsen, Knud Gjerstad, Christian Oftedahl and Frithiof Lund on 24 February 1941, Hedin successfully appealed via Colonel General Nikolaus von Falkenhorst to Adolf Hitler for their reprieve. Their death sentences were converted on 17 June 1941 by Adolf Hitler to ten years of forced labor. The Norwegians Carl W. Mueller, Knud Naerum, Peder Fagerland, Ottar Ryan, Tor Gerrard Rydland, Hans Bernhard Risanger and Arne Sørvag who had been condemned to forced labor under the same charge received reduced sentences at Hedin's request. Unfortunately, Hans Bernhard Risanger died in prison just a few days before his release.

Falkenhorst was sentenced by a joint British-Norwegian military tribunal to be executed by firing squad on 2 August 1946 due to his role in the summary execution of British prisoners of war during Operation Freshman. Hedin intervened on his behalf on 4 December 1946, arguing that Falkenhorst had likewise striven to pardon the ten Norwegians condemned to death. Falkenhorst's death sentence was commuted to 20 years in prison. He was released early from Werl Prison on 13 July 1953.

== Awards ==
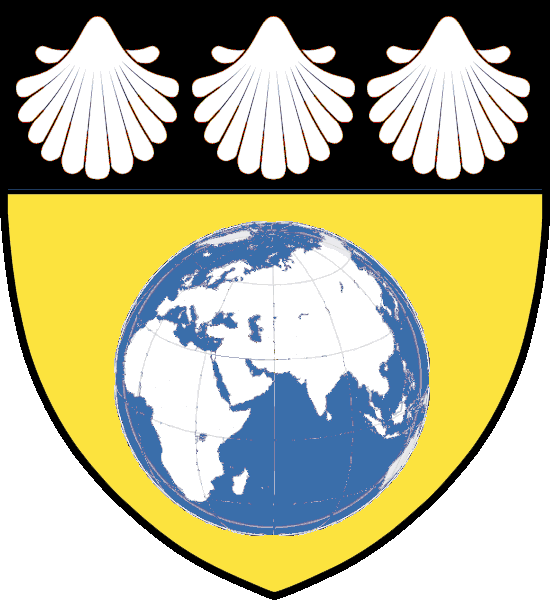
COA for Sven Hedin

Because of his outstanding services, Hedin was raised to the untitled nobility by King Oskar II in 1902, the last time any Swede was to receive a charter of nobility. Oskar II suggested that he prefix the name Hedin with one of the two common predicates of nobility in Sweden, "af" or "von", but Hedin abstained from doing so in his written response to the king. In many noble families in Sweden, it was customary to do without the title of nobility. The coat of arms of Hedin, together with those of some two thousand noble families, is to be found on a wall of the Great Hall in Riddarhuset, the assembly house of Swedish nobility in Stockholm's inner city, Gamla Stan.

In 1905, Hedin was admitted to membership in the Royal Swedish Academy of Sciences and in 1909 to the Royal Swedish Academy of War Sciences. From 1913 to 1952 he held the sixth of 18 chairs as an elected member of the Swedish Academy. In this position, he had a vote in the selection of Nobel Prize winners.

He was an honorary member of numerous Swedish and foreign scientific societies and institutions which honored him with some 40 gold medals; 27 of these medals can be viewed in Stockholm in a display case in the Royal Coin Cabinet.

He received honorary doctorates from the University of Oxford (1909), the University of Cambridge (1909), Heidelberg University (1928), Uppsala University (1935), the Ludwig-Maximilians-Universität München (1943), from the Handelshochschule Berlin (1931) (all Dr. phil. h.c.), from the University of Breslau (1915, Dr. jur. h.c.), and from the University of Rostock (1919, Dr. med. h.c.).

Numerous countries presented him with medals. In Sweden he became a Commander 1st Class of the Royal Order of the North Star (KNO1kl) with a brilliant badge and Knight of the Royal Order of Vasa (RVO). In the United Kingdom he was named Knight Commander of the Order of the Indian Empire by King Edward VII. As a foreigner, he was not authorized to use the associated title of Sir, but he could place the designation KCIE after his family name Hedin. Hedin was also a Grand Cross of the Order of the German Eagle.

In his honor have been named a glacier, the Sven Hedin Glacier; a lunar crater Hedin; a genus of flowering plants, Hedinia; a species of the flowering plant, Gentiana hedini (now a synonym of Comastoma falcatum (Turcz.) Toyok.); the beetles Longitarsus hedini and Coleoptera hedini; a butterfly, Fumea hedini Caradja; a spider, Dictyna hedini; a fossil hoofed mammal, Tsaidamotherium hedini; a fossil Therapsid (a "mammal-like reptile") Lystrosaurus hedini; and streets and squares in the cities of various countries (for example, "Hedinsgatan" at Tessinparken in Stockholm).

A permanent exhibition of articles found by Hedin on his expeditions is located in the Stockholm Ethnographic Museum.

In the Adolf Frederick church can be found the Sven Hedin memorial plaque by Liss Eriksson. The plaque was installed in 1959. On it, a globe with Asia to the fore can be seen, crowned with a camel. It bears the Swedish epitaph:

Asia's unknown expanses were his world—Sweden remained his home.

The Sven Hedin Firn in North Greenland was named after him.

== Research on Hedin ==
=== Source material ===
A survey of the extensive sources for Hedin research shows that it would be difficult at present to come to a fair assessment of the personality and achievements of Hedin. Most of the source material has not yet been subjected to scientific scrutiny. Even the DFG project Sven Hedin und die deutsche Geographie had to restrict itself to a small selection and a random examination of the source material.

The sources for Hedin research are located in numerous archives (and include primary literature, correspondence, newspaper articles, obituaries and secondary literature).

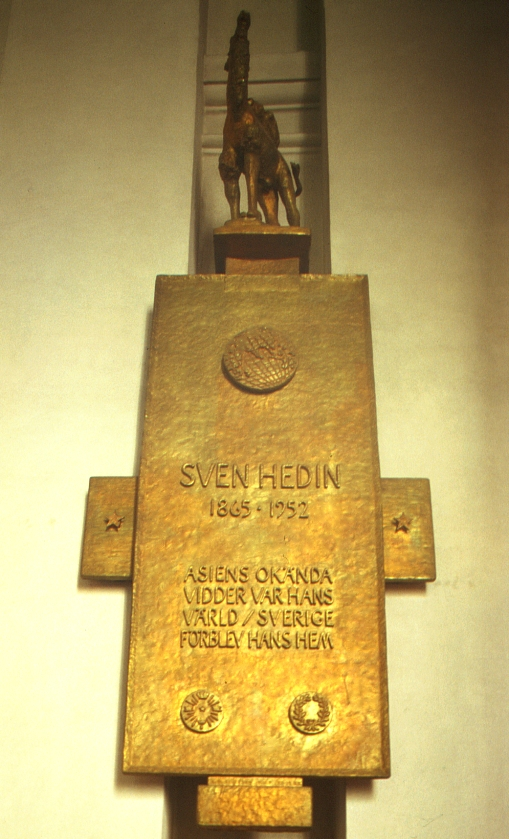
Memorial plaque with epitaph for Hedin by Liss Eriksson (1959) in the Adolf Fredrik church, Stockholm

- Hedin's own publications amount to some 30,000 pages.
- There are about 2,500 drawings and watercolors, films and many photographs.
- To this should be added 25 volumes with travel and expedition notes and 145 volumes of the diaries he regularly maintained between 1930 and 1952, totaling 8,257 pages.
- The extensive holdings of the Hedin Foundation (Sven Hedins Stiftelse), which holds Hedin effects in trust, are to be found in the Ethnographic Museum and in the National Archives in Stockholm.
- Hedin's correspondence is in the archive of the German Foreign Office in Bonn, in the German Federal Archives in Koblenz, at the Leibniz Institute for Regional Geography in Leipzig, and above all in the Ethnographic Museum and in the National Archives in Stockholm. Most of the correspondence in Hedin's estate is in the National Archives and accessible to researchers and the general public. It includes about 50,000 letters organized alphabetically according to country and sender as well as some 30,000 additional unsorted letters.
- The scientific effects as well as a collection of newspaper articles about Hedin organized by year (1895–1952) in 60 bound folios can be found in the Ethnographic Museum.
- The finds from Tibet, Mongolia and Xinjiang are, among other places, in Stockholm in the Ethnographic Museum (some 8,000 individual items), in the Institutes of Geology, Minearology and Paleontology of Uppsala University, in the depots of the Bavarian State Collection of Paleontology and Geology in Munich, and in the National Museum of China, Beijing.

=== Hedin's documentation ===
During his expeditions Hedin saw the focus of his work as being in field research. He recorded routes by plotting many thousands of kilometers of his caravan itinerary with the detail of a high resolution topographical map and supplemented them with innumerable altitude measurements and latitude and longitude data. At the same time he combined his field maps with panoramic drawings. He drafted the first precise maps of areas unresearched until that date: the Pamir mountains, the Taklamakan desert, Tibet, the Silk Road and the Himalayas. He was, as far as can be scientifically confirmed, the first European to recognize that the Himalayas were a continuous mountain range.

He systematically studied the lakes of inner Asia, made careful climatological observations over many years, and started extensive collections of rocks, plants, animals and antiquities. Underway he prepared watercolor paintings, sketches, drawings and photographs, which he later published in his works. The photographs and maps with the highest quality printing are to be found in the original Swedish publications.

Hedin prepared a scientific publication for each of his expeditions. The extent of documentation increased dramatically from expedition to expedition. His research report about the first expedition was published in 1900 as Die geographisch-wissenschaftlichen Ergebnisse meiner Reisen in Zentralasien 1894–97 (Supplement 28 to Petermanns Mitteilungen), Gotha 1900. The publication about the second expedition, Scientific Results of a Journey in Central Asia, increased to six text and two atlas volumes. Southern Tibet, the scientific publication on the third expedition, totalled twelve volumes, three of which were atlases. The results of the Sino-Swedish Expedition were published under the title of Reports from the scientific expedition to the north-western provinces of China under leadership of Dr. Sven Hedin. The sino-Swedish expedition. This publication went through 49 editions.

This documentation was splendidly produced, which made the price so high that only a few libraries and institutes were able to purchase it. The immense printing costs had to be borne for the most part by Hedin himself, as was also true for the cost of the expeditions. He used the fees and royalties which he received from his popular science books and for his lectures for the purpose.

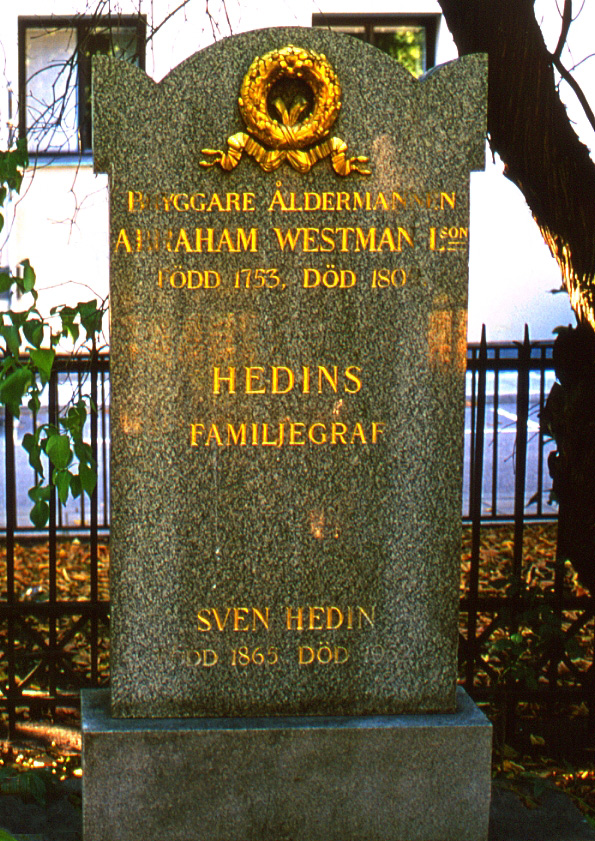
Hedin's Gravestone in the cemetery of Adolf Fredriks church in Stockholm, Sweden

Hedin did not himself subject his documentation to scientific evaluation, but rather handed it over to other scientists for the purpose. Since he shared his experiences during his expeditions as popular science and incorporated them in a large number of lectures, travelogues, books for young people and adventure books, he became known to the general public. He soon became famous as one of the most well-recognized personalities of his time.

D. Henze wrote the following about an exhibition at the Deutsches Museum entitled Sven Hedin, the last explorer:

He was a pioneer and pathfinder in the transitional period to a century of specialized research. No other single person illuminated and represented unknown territories more extensively than he. His maps alone are a unique creation. And the artist did not take second place to the savant, who deep in the night rapidly and apparently without effort rapidly created awe inspiring works. The discipline of geography, at least in Germany, has so far only concerned itself with his popularized reports. The consistent inclusion of the enormous, still unmined treasures in his scientific work are yet to be incorporated in the regional geography of Asia.

=== Current Hedin research ===
A scientific assessment of Hedin's character and his relationship to National Socialism was undertaken in the late 1990s and early 2000s at the University of Bonn by Professor Hans Böhm, Dipl.-Geogr. Astrid Mehmel and Christoph Sieker M.A. as part of the DFG Project Sven Hedin und die deutsche Geographie (Sven Hedin and German Geography).

== Literature ==
=== Primary ===
==== Scientific documentation ====
- Sven Hedin: Die geographisch-wissenschaftlichen Ergebnisse meiner Reisen in Zentralasien 1894–97. Supplementary volume 28 to Petermanns Mitteilungen. Gotha 1900.
- Sven Hedin: Scientific results of a journey in Central-Asia. 10 text and 2 map volumes. Stockholm 1904–1907. Volume 4
- Sven Hedin: Trans-Himalaya: Discoveries and Adventures in Tibet, Volume 1 1909 VOL. II
- Sven Hedin: Southern Tibet. 11 text and 3 map volumes. Stockholm 1917–1922. VOL. VIII
- Reports from the scientific expedition to the north-western provinces of China under leadership of Dr. Sven Hedin. The sino-Swedish expedition. Over 50 volumes to date, contains primary and secondary literature. Stockholm 1937 ff.
- Sven Hedin: Central Asia atlas. Maps, Statens etnografiska museum. Stockholm 1966. (appeared in the series Reports from the scientific expedition to the north-western provinces of China under the leadership of Dr. Sven Hedin. The sino-Swedish expedition; Ausgabe 47. 1. Geography; 1)
- Sven Anders Hedin, Folke Bergman (1944). History of the expedition in Asia, 1927–1935, Part 3. Stockholm: Göteborg, Elanders boktryckeri aktiebolag.
- Central Asia and Tibet: Towards the Holy City of Lassa, Volume 1
- THROUGH ASIA
- Through Asia, Volume 1

==== German editions ====
a) Biography

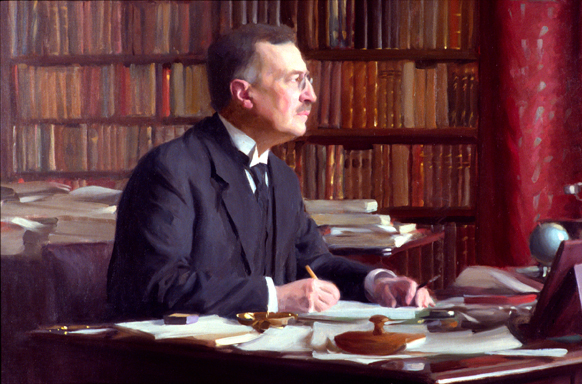
- Sven Hedin by Carl Emil Österman 1923
  Verwehte Spuren. Orientfahrten des Reise-Bengt und anderer Reisenden im 17. Jahrhundert, Leipzig 1923.

b) Popular works

- Durch Asiens Wüsten. Drei Jahre auf neuen Wegen in Pamir, Lop-nor, Tibet und China, 2 vol., Leipzig 1899; neue Ausgabe Wiesbaden 1981.
- Im Herzen von Asien. Zehntausend Kilometer auf unbekannten Pfaden, 2 vol., Leipzig 1903.
- Abenteuer in Tibet, Leipzig 1904; new edition Wiesbaden 1980.
- Transhimalaja. Entdeckungen und Abenteuer in Tibet, Leipzig 1909–1912; new edition Wiesbaden 1985.
- Zu Land nach Indien durch Persien. Seistan und Bclutschistan, 2 vol., Leipzig 1910.
- Von Pol zu Pol, 3 vol., Leipzig 1911–1912; new edition Wiesbaden 1980.
- Bagdad – Babylon – Ninive, Leipzig 1918
- Jerusalem, Leipzig 1918.
- General Prschewalskij in Innerasien, Leipzig 1922.
- Meine erste Reise, Leipzig 1922.
- An der Schwelle Innerasiens, Leipzig 1923.
- Mount Everest, Leipzig 1923.
- Persien und Mesopotamien, zwei asiatische Probleme, Leipzig 1923.
- Von Peking nach Moskau, Leipzig 1924.
- Gran Canon. Mein Besuch im amerikanischen Wunderland, Leipzig 1926.
- Auf großer Fahrt. Meine Expedition mit Schweden, Deutschen und Chinesen durch die Wüste Gobi 1927– 1928, Leipzig 1929.
- Rätsel der Gobi. Die Fortsetzung der Großen Fahrt durch Innerasien in den Jahren 1928–1930, Leipzig 1931.
- Jehol, die Kaiserstadt, Leipzig 1932.
- Die Flucht des Großen Pferdes, Leipzig 1935.
- Die Seidenstraße, Leipzig 1936.
- Der wandernde See, Leipzig 1937.
- Im Verbotenen Land, Leipzig 1937

c) Political works

- Ein Warnungsruf, Leipzig 1912.
- Ein Volk in Waffen, Leipzig 1915.
- Nach Osten!, Leipzig 1916.
- Deutschland und der Weltfriede, Leipzig 1937 (unlike its translations, the original German edition of this title was printed but never delivered; only five copies were bound, one of which is in the possession of the F. A. Brockhaus Verlag, Wiesbaden).
- Amerika im Kampf der Kontinente, Leipzig 1942

d) Autobiographical works

- Mein Leben als Entdecker, Leipzig 1926.
- Eroberungszüge in Tibet, Leipzig 1940.
- Ohne Auftrag in Berlin, Buenos Aires 1949; Tübingen-Stuttgart 1950.
- Große Männer, denen ich begegnete, 2 volumes, Wiesbaden 1951.
- Meine Hunde in Asien, Wiesbaden 1953.
- Mein Leben als Zeichner, published by Gösta Montell in commemoration of Hedin's 100th birthday, Wiesbaden 1965.

e) Fiction

- Tsangpo Lamas Wallfahrt, 2 vol., Leipzig 1921–1923.

Most German publications on Hedin were translated by F.A. Brockhaus Verlag from Swedish into German. To this extent Swedish editions are the original text. Often after the first edition appeared, F.A. Brockhaus Verlag published abridged versions with the same title. Hedin had not only an important business relationship with the publisher Albert Brockhaus, but also a close friendship. Their correspondence can be found in the Riksarkivet in Stockholm. There is a publication on this subject:

- Sven Hedin, Albert Brockhaus: Sven Hedin und Albert Brockhaus. Eine Freundschaft in Briefen zwischen Autor und Verleger. F. A. Brockhaus, Leipzig 1942.

=== Bibliography ===
- Willy Hess: Die Werke Sven Hedins. Versuch eines vollständigen Verzeichnisses. Sven Hedin – Leben und Briefe, Vol. I. Stockholm 1962. likewise.: First Supplement. Stockholm 1965
- Manfred Kleiner: Sven Anders Hedin 1865–1952 – eine Bibliografie der Sekundärliteratur. Self-published Manfred Kleinert, Princeton 2001.

=== Biographies ===
- Detlef Brennecke: Sven Hedin mit Selbstzeugnissen und Bilddokumenten. Rowohlt, Reinbek bei Hamburg 1986, 1991. ISBN 3-499-50355-7
- Johannes Paul: Abenteuerliche Lebensreise – Sieben biografische Essays. including: Sven Hedin. Der letzte Entdeckungsreisende. Wilhelm Köhler Verlag, Minden 1954, pp. 317–378.
- Alma Hedin: Mein Bruder Sven. Nach Briefen und Erinnerungen. Brockhaus Verlag, Leipzig 1925.
- Eric Wennerholm: Sven Hedin 1865–1952. F. A. Brockhaus Verlag, Wiesbaden 1978. ISBN 3-7653-0302-X
- Axel Odelberg: Äventyr på Riktigt Berättelsen om Upptäckaren Sven Hedin. Norstedts, Stockholm 2008 (new biography in Swedish, 600 pages).

=== Hedin and National Socialism ===
- Mehmel, Astrid: Sven Hedin und nationalsozialistische Expansionspolitik. In: Geopolitik. Grenzgänge im Zeitgeist Bd. 1 .1 1890 bis 1945 ed. by Irene Diekmann, Peter Krüger und Julius H. Schoeps, Potsdam 2000, pp. 189–238.
- Danielsson, S.K.: The Intellectual Unmasked: Sven Hedin's Political Life from Pan-Germanism to National Socialism. Dissertation, Minnesota, 2005.

== See also ==
- List of explorations
- Swedish intervention in Persia
- Sino-Swedish Expedition
- Adolf Erik Nordenskiöld
- Vega expedition

Cultural offices
| Preceded by Hans Hildebrand | Swedish Academy, Seat No 6; 1913–1952 | Succeeded by Sten Selander |
