= Walter Beick =

Baltic German ornithologist (1883–1933)

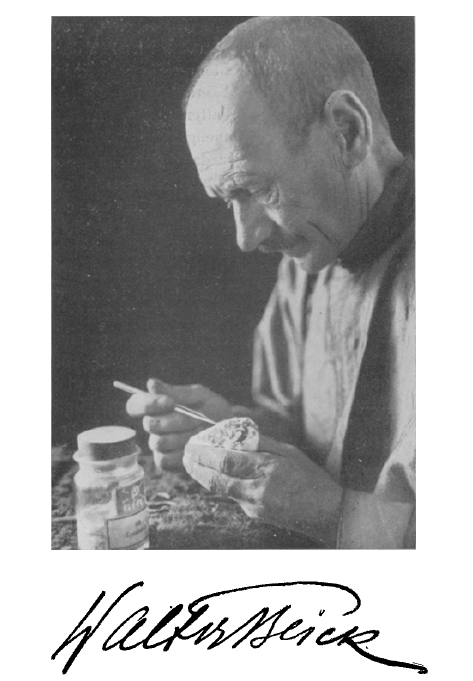
- Portrait of Walter Beick used by Erwin Stresemann in a tribute article
- Died: 25 March 1933
- Occupation: Forestry scientist, zoological collector, scientific collector

Walter Beick (1 October 1883 – 25 March 1933) was a Russian ornithologist of Baltic German descent who explored and studied the birdlife of Tibet and Mongolia. He made large collections of specimens and several species have been described based on his collections and named after him.

== Life ==
Beick was born in Võru, Estonia, which was then a Baltic province of Russia. The son of a lawyer, he went to school at St. Petersburg in the gymnasium of Dr Wiedemann and then at the Eberswalde forestry school. He served in the First World War with the Russian army and was wounded on the German front. He then settled in Russian Turkestan and from 1916 began to make hunting trips from the Ala-tau mountains. His knowledge of the region led to him being chosen to lead a commando expedition against nomadic tribes. In 1917, he moved to Prezewalsk on the shore of Issy-Kul and in 1918 he worked in the forest service in Sepsinsk. He was briefly the director of the Forest School in Werny. In 1920, he was forced to give up all his possessions including his collections to the Bolsheviks and fled to Chinese Turkestan, where he lived by hunting and fishing. In 1925 he was supported for a collection expedition to Ebi Nor by the Berlin Museum under the director Paul Matschie. He travelled to Siningfu in 1927 where he met and travelled with Wilhelm Filchner and then moved on to the South Tetung followed by Koku Nor along with Friedrich Wagner. He then moved to Sining and stayed for two years. He joined Birger Bohlin of the Sino-Swedish Expedition led by Sven Hedin and spent some time in Tsag Nor and was hoping to return to Germany. On the way at Wajan Tori he suffered from a breakdown and in a fit of depression he shot himself. He was buried in the desert with a cross inscribed "Walter Beick, 25 March 1933" at 42° N, 101° 19′ 6″ E.

Subspecies that have been named after him include the following, although not all are now considered valid.

- Dendrocopus major beicki Stresemann, 1927 a subspecies of the great spotted woodpecker
- Prunella rubeculoides beicki Mayr, 1927 a subspecies of the robin accentor
- Phoenicurus schisticeps beicki Stresemann, 1927 a subspecies of the white-throated redstart
- Cinclus cinclus beicki Meise, 1928 a subspecies of the white-throated dipper
- Aegolius funereus beickianus Stresemann, 1928 a subspecies of the boreal owl
- Carpodacus synoicus beicki Stresemann, 1930 a subspecies of the Sinai rosefinch
- Calandrella cheleensis beicki Meise, 1933 a subspecies of the Asian short-toed lark
- Ithaginis cruentus beicki Mayr & Birckhead, 1937 a subspecies called Beick's blood pheasant
- Rhopophilus pekinensis beicki Meise, 1937 a subspecies of the Beijing babbler
- Luscinia calliope beicki Meise, 1937 a subspecies of the Siberian rubythroat
