= Gösta Montell =

Karl Gösta Montell (1899–1975) was a Swedish ethnographer.

== Life ==
Montell was born in Pajala, Sweden, on 7 November 1899. His research focused on Inner Mongolia, Outer Mongolia, and the Chinese Summer Palace at Chengde (then known as Rehe). He was a member of Sven Hedin's Sino-Swedish Expedition to Central Asia in 1929–1933, and the extensive ethnographic collection, which he acquired on behalf of Hedin is now housed in the Ethnographic Museum (Statens etnografiska museum) in Stockholm. He subsequently became Director of the Asian Department of that museum. He died in Stockholm on 2 January 1975.

== Selected publications ==
- An archaeological collection from the Rio Loa Valley, Atacama. with comments on the excavation by Claus Royem. Oslo Etnografiske Museums Skrifter. Band 5, Heft 1, Oslo 1926.
- Dress and ornaments in ancient Peru. Archaeological and Historical Studies. Göteborg, 1929.
- with Sven Hedin: The Chinese lama temple Potala of Jehol. Exhibition of historical and ethnographical collections. Made by Dr. Gösta Montell, member of Dr. Sven Hedin's Expeditions, and donated by Vincent Bendix. Chicago: Century of Progress Exposition 1932 (Weltausstellung 1933/1934).
- Ethnographische Forschung. In: Petermanns Geographische Mitteilungen 1935, Gotha 1935, pp. 294–295.
- The Lama Temple Potala of Jehol. Plan of the Monastery-Ground. In: Geografiska Annaler. Band 17, Supplement: Hyllningsskrift Tillagnad Sven Hedin (1935), S. 175–184.
- Sven Hedin’s Archaeological Collections from Khotan: Terra-cottas from Yotkan and Dandan-Uiliq. In: The Bulletin of the Museum of Far Eastern Antiquities. Band 7, 1936, S. 145–221.
- Mongol Life and a Journey to Etsingol. In: Journal of the Royal Central Asian Society. Issue XXIV, October 1937.
- Sven Hedin’s Archaeological Collections from Khotan II (appendix by Helmer Smith (S. 101–102)), In: The Bulletin of the Museum of Far Eastern Antiquities. Band 10, 1938, S. 83–113.
- Durch die Steppen der Mongolei. Mit einem Vorwort von Sven Hedin und zahlreichen Abbildungen nach Aufnahmen des Verfassers. Union Deutsche Verlagsgesellschaft, Stuttgart 1938.
- Ferdinand Lessing and Gösta Montell: Yung-Ho-Kung, an Iconography of the Lamaist Cathedral in Peking: With Notes on Lamaist Mythology and Cult. In: Reports from Scientific Expedition to the North-western Provinces of China under the Leadership of Dr. Sven Hedin. The Sino-Swedish Expedition. Publ. 18. Part VIII. Ethnography. 1, Stockholm 1942.
- As Ethnographer in China and Mongolia 1929–1932. History of the Expedition in Asia 1927–1935. General Reports of Travels and Fieldworks by Folke Bergman, Gherard Bexell, Birger Bohlin, Gösta Montell. In: Reports from Scientific Expedition to the North-western Provinces of China under the Leadership of Dr. Sven Hedin. The Sino-Swedish Expedition. Publ. 26, Part IV, Stockholm 1945.
- with Dietrich Lutze: Unter Göttern und Menschen. Erinnerungen an glückliche Jahre in Peking. F. A. Brockhaus Verlag, Wiesbaden 1948.
- Sven Hedin, the Explorer. In: Geographiska annaler. Band 36, 1954, S. 1–8.
- with Werner Schultze: Sven Hedin Ausstellung in Deutschland. Aus den Sammlungen der Sven-Hedin-Stiftung in Stockholm. F. A. Brockhaus Verlag, Wiesbaden 1955.
- Sven Hedin’s mapping in Asia. In: Bull. of Geological Institutions of Uppsala University. Band XL, Uppsala 1961, S. 479–484.
- Gösta Montell (ed.): Sven Hedin - Mein Leben als Zeichner. Zum 100. Geburtstag von Sven Hedin. Brockhaus Verlag, Wiesbaden 1965.
- The Explorer. In: Ethnos. Band 30, 1965, S. 7–24.

== See also ==
- Sven Hedin
