= Jin Kemu =

Jin Kemu (Chinese: 金克木; pinyin: Jīn Kèmù; 1912–2000) was a Chinese poet, scholar, translator and essay writer, professor of Beijing University.

In 1935 he started to write poems and novels. In his early years he had different careers as a librarian, newspaper editor and English teacher. In 1941 he went to India, studied ancient Indian literature, Buddhism, philosophy and returned China in 1946. At the time he was one of few scholars in China who knew Sanskrit and Pali language.

In 1946, the Department of Oriental Languages and Literature was established in Beijing University. Jin kemu joined in 1948, he and Ji Xianlin together contributed in developing the Department of Oriental Languages and Literature.

He has translated some ancient India literature and philosophy works into Chinese. In his old age he continued to write essays which are considered among the finest essays in contemporary China.
