= Jiřice =

Jiřice may refer to places in the Czech Republic:

- Jiřice (Nymburk District), a municipality and village in the Central Bohemian Region
- Jiřice (Pelhřimov District), a municipality and village in the Vysočina Region
- Jiřice, a village and part of Kostelec nad Labem in the Central Bohemian Region
- Jiřice, a village and part of Řendějov in the Central Bohemian Region
- Jiřice u Miroslavi, a municipality and village in the South Moravian Region
- Jiřice u Moravských Budějovic, a municipality and village in the South Moravian Region
