= Balada pro banditu =

Czech stage musical play

Balada pro banditu (English: A Ballad for a Bandit) is a Czech stage musical play and film with music by Miloš Štědroň and screenplay by Milan Uhde.

== Story ==
Songs by camp fire based on the novel Nikola Šuhaj loupežník (The Bandit Nikola Šuhaj) by Ivan Olbracht. Actors sing to guitar accompaniment the song "Guy from Kolochava".

== Film ==
- Directed by Vladimír Sís.
- Nikola Šuhaj .... Miroslav Donutil
- Erzsika .... Iva Bittová
- Morana .... Blanka Rudová
- Erzsika's father .... František Derfler
- Erzsika's brother .... Martin Havelka
- Nikola's brother .... Petr Maláč
- Mageri ..... Bolek Polívka
- Chief Policeman .... Jiří Pecha
- Derbak .... Pavel Zatloukal
- Derbaková .... Evelyna Steimarová
- Danko .... Vladimír Hauser
- Uhrín .... Daniel Dítě
- Morana's sister .... Michaela Dudová
- Morana's sister .... Alice Hásová
- Gravedigger .... Rudy Kovanda
- Kubeš .... Pavel Nový
- František Kocourek
- Gustav Opočenský
- Greenhorns

=== Premiere cast - Divadlo Husa na Provázku, Brno ===
- Directed by Zdeněk Pospíšil. The play had its première in Spring 1975.
- Nikola Šuhaj .... Miroslav Donutil
- Erzsika .... Iva Bittová
- Morana .... Blanka Rudová
- Erzsika's father .... František Derfler
- Erzsika's brother .... Martin Havelka
- Nikola's brother .... Petr Maláč
- Mageri ..... Bolek Polívka
- Chief Policeman .... Jiří Pecha
- Derbak .... Pavel Zatloukal
- Derbaková .... Evelyna Steimarová
- Danko .... Vladimír Hauser
- Uhrín .... Daniel Dítě
- Morana's sister .... Michaela Dudová
- Morana's sister .... Alice Hásová
- Gravedigger .... Rudy Kovanda
- Kubeš .... Pavel Nový
- František Kocourek
- Gustav Opočenský
- Greenhorns

=== Divadlo Šumperk ===
- Directed by Ondrej Elbel. The premiere took place on 31 October 2009 in 7:30 p.m. in theatre in Šumperk.
- Nikola Šohaj .... Václav Vítek
- Erzsika .... Lenka Koštáková
- Morana .... Olga Kaštická
- Mageri .... Petr Komínek
- Derbak .... Jiří Bartoň
- Oreb Danko, Jura Šohaj .... Vojtěch Lipina
- Commander of Police Officer's .... Lukáš Matěj
- Andrej, Kubeš, Icu Šohaj .... Jan Kroneisl
- Drač, gendarme Bouda .... Petr Král
- Granny Derbaková .... Bohdana Pavlíková
- Mrs. Derbaková's daughter, a girl of Kolochava .... Vendula Fialová
- Mailman, gendarme .... Jiří Konečný
- Gendarme .... Pavel Orság

== Songs ==
- Zabili, zabili (They killed, They killed)
- Křížem, krážem (Crisscross)
- Tmavá nocka (The Dark Night)
- Ani tak nehoří (Not So Much Burn)
- Nepůjdu od tebe (I will not go from you)
- Šibeničky (Small Gallows)
- Nebudu orat ani set
- Pod javorem (Under the Maple)
- Tam u řeky na kraji
- Tam na hoře (Up There)
- Pojďme chlapci pojďme krást
- Kamarádi moji (My Friends)
- Večer mizí
- Chodí horou 300 ovec
- Dobrý večer nám (Good Evening Us)
- Jatelinka dobrá
- Stavěli, stavěli
- Řekněte mamce, prokrista (Tell mum, for Christ's sake)
