= František Šimůnek =

Czech ski jumper

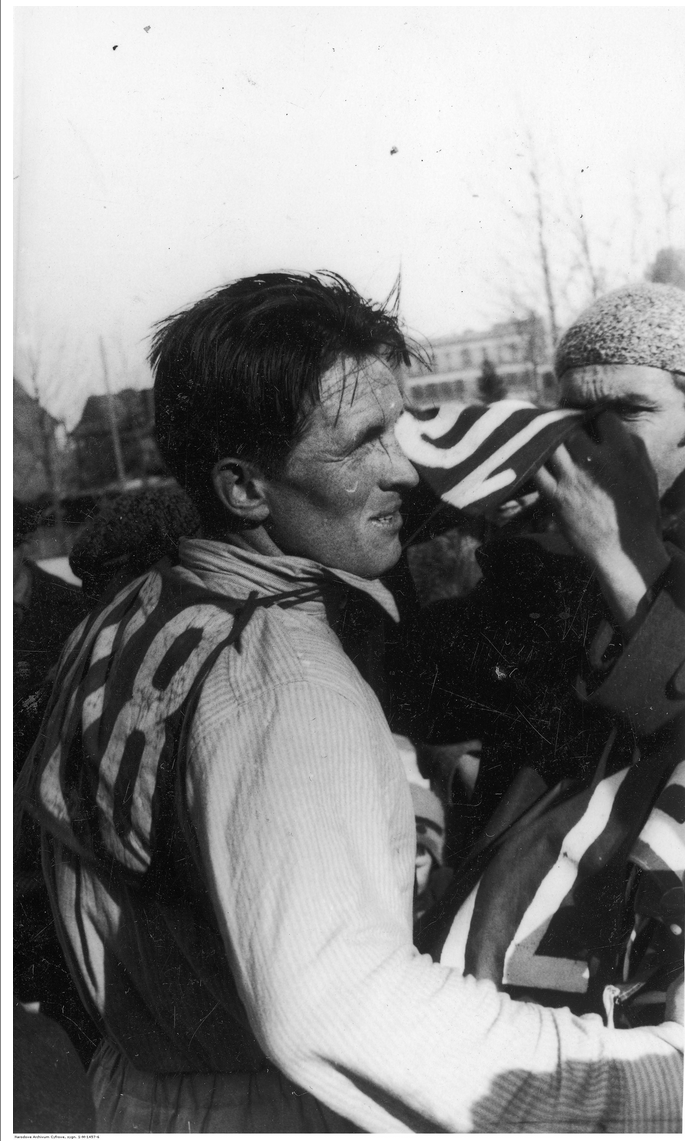
- Šimůnek in 1934

Personal information
- Born: 2 December 1910 Zlatá Olešnice, Bohemia, Austria-Hungary
- Died: 17 July 1989 (aged 78) Řendějov, Czechoslovakia
Medal record
Men's cross-country skiing
Representing Czechoslovakia
World Championships
Silver medal – second place	1933 Innsbruck	4 x 10 km

František Šimůnek (2 December 1910 – 17 July 1989) was a Czech Nordic skier who competed for Czechoslovakia in the 1930s. He won a silver medal in the 4 x 10 km at the 1933 FIS Nordic World Ski Championships in Innsbruck.

Šimůnek was born in Zlatá Olešnice in December 1910. He finished 8th in the Nordic combined and 23rd in ski jumping at the 1932 Winter Olympics in Lake Placid. Four years later he finished 5th in both the 4 x 10 km cross-country and the Nordic combined, and 11th in the 18 km cross-country event at the 1936 Winter Olympics in Garmisch-Partenkirchen. He also competed in the 1948 Winter Olympics held in St. Moritz, and finished 36th in Nordic combined and 72nd in 18 km event.

He died in Řendějov on 17 July 1989, at the age of 78.
