= Olbracht =

The name Olbracht refers to several people:

- Jan I Olbracht, English John I Albert (1459–1501), King of Poland
- Ivan Olbracht, born Karel Zeman (1882–1952), Czech writer
