= Antal Stašek =

Czech writer and lawyer

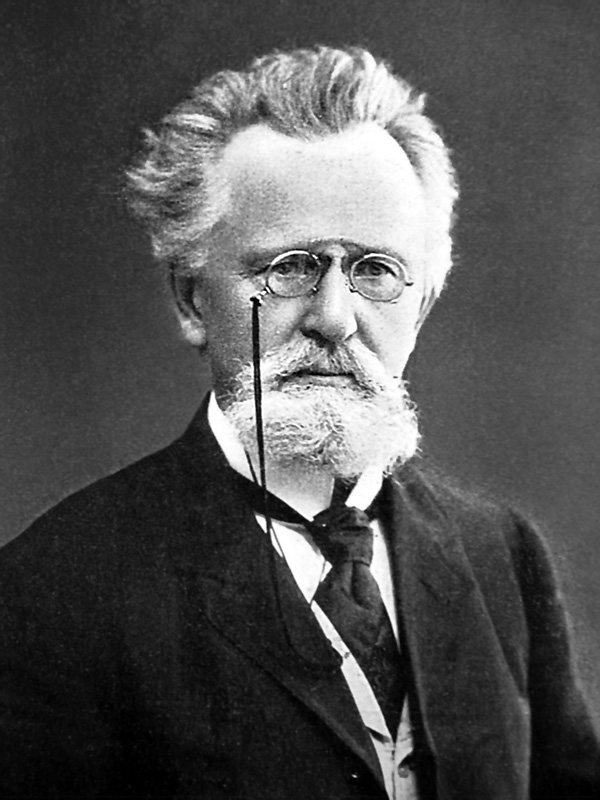
- Antal Stašek
- Born: Antonín Zeman; 22 July 1843; Stanový, Kingdom of Bohemia
- Died: 9 October 1931 (aged 88); Prague, Czechoslovakia
- Occupations: Writer, lawyer
- Spouse: Kamila Schönfeldová
- Children: Ivan Olbracht

Antal Stašek (born Antonín Zeman) (22 July 1843 – 9 October 1931) was a Czech writer and lawyer.

== Life and work ==
Stašek was born in the village of Stanový (now part of Zlatá Olešnice) in northern Bohemia. From 1877, Stašek was a successful barrister in Semily. His work is mainly set in the area around the Krkonoše mountains that straddle the border between the Czech Republic and Poland. Stašek was heavily influenced by socialism and social justice and was perhaps the first Czech writer to work with these themes.

His best known novel is Matusch the Shoemaker and his Friends, published posthumously in 1932. Stašek worked briefly in Mohelnice before moving in 1913 to Prague, where he spent the rest of his life. The writer Ivan Olbracht was his son.
