= Ivan Olbracht =

Czech writer, journalist and translator (1882-1952)

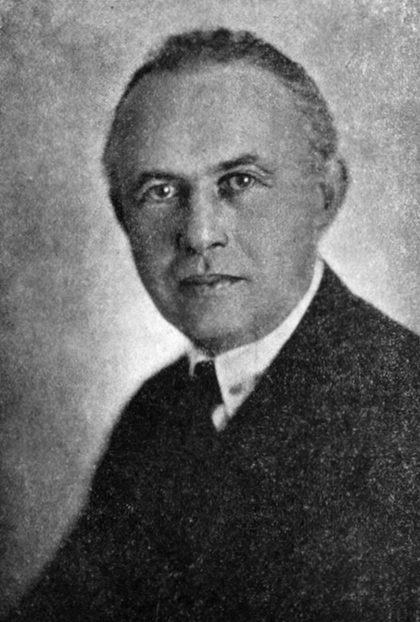
- Ivan Olbracht before 1929
- Born: Kamil Zeman; 6 January 1882; Semily, Kingdom of Bohemia, Austria-Hungary
- Died: 30 December 1952 (aged 70); Prague, Czechoslovakia
- Occupations: Poet, journalist
- Spouse: Helena Malířová
- Relatives: Antal Stašek (father)
- Writing career
- Notable work: Anna Proletářka

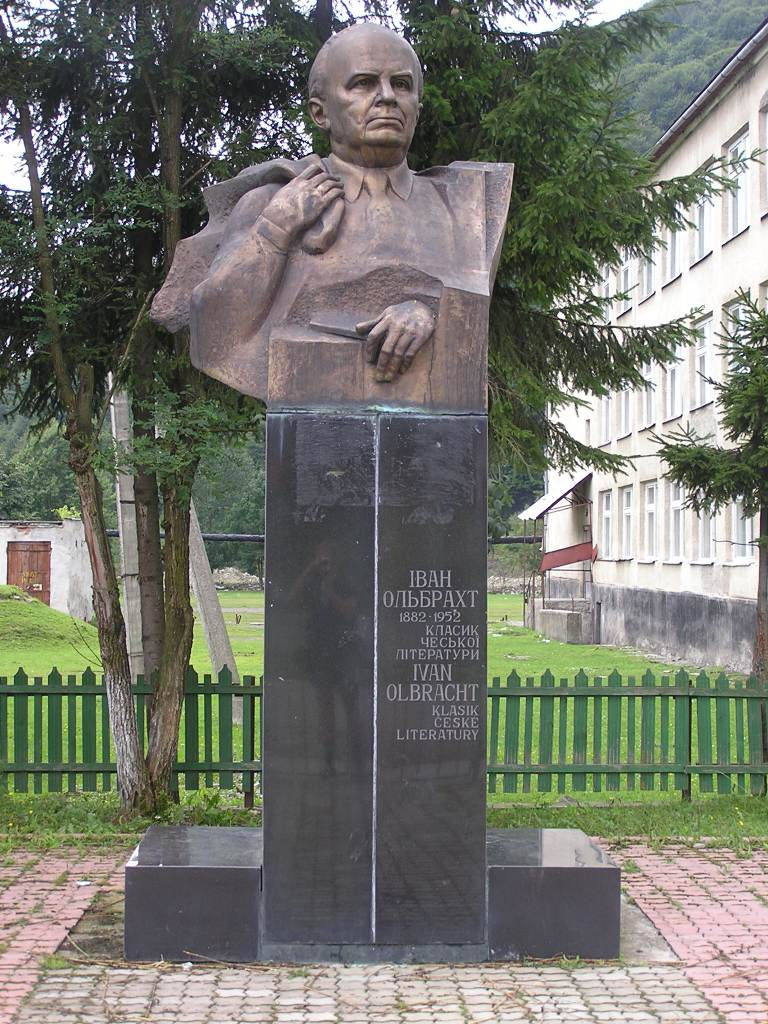
Ivan Olbracht memorial in Kolochava village, now part of Ukraine.

Ivan Olbracht, born Kamil Zeman (6 January 1882 – 20 December 1952), was a Czech writer, journalist, censor and translator of German prose.

== Biography ==
The son of writer Antal Stašek and his Jewish-born Catholic convert wife Kamila Schönfeldová. Olbracht studied law and philosophy in Prague and Berlin, he left before graduation, however, choosing the career of a journalist. In 1905, he first began editing a social-democratic workers' newspaper in Vienna (Dělnické listy, Historical Papers), where he worked until 1916. When he first began publishing fiction, he primarily focused on stories and novels with a psychological theme. This phase of his writing life coincided with the First World War. His works after the War are an experimentation in blending fiction with real events.

Later, he became an editor in Prague (Právo lidu, The People's Right). In 1920, he spent six months living in the Soviet Union. The following year, he joined the Communist Party of Czechoslovakia and began working for Rudé právo. He was twice imprisoned due to his communist views, first in 1926 (in Slezská Ostrava) and later in 1928 (in Pankrác Prison).

In 1929, together with six other writers, Olbracht signed a protest statement against the new leadership of the Communist Party. This resulted in his expulsion from the party and loss of his editorial post. Without political obligations or a job, he turned his attention entirely toward writing. The ensuing years were some of his most productive. Beginning in 1931, he started to travel regularly to Carpathian Ruthenia, in the east of Czechoslovakia. The region, which was inhabited mostly by Rusyn peasants and Jews, created a deep impression on him. His experiences there inspired some of his best works. His novel, Nikola Šuhaj loupežník (Nikola Šuhaj, Outlaw), published in 1933 was based on a real person. The story spoke of a peasant Robin Hood who robbed the rich to provide for the poor. The book eventually acquired the status of a folktale.

In 1934, he co-wrote the screenplay for Marijka nevěrnice (Marijka the Unfaithful). The following year, he published Hory a staletí (Mountains and Centuries), which was a combination of political ethnography and criticism of what he perceived as the Czechoslovak government's colonialist policies in Podkarpatská Rus. In 1937, his book Golet v údolí (Golet in the Valley) was published. The book consisted of three interwoven stories about Orthodox Jews. The longest of the stories was "Smutné oči Hany Karadžičové" (The Sad Eyes of Hana Karadžičová), a sad tale of a Jewish girl who is ostracized by her village for marrying an atheist Jew. "Golet in the Valley" was the last of his works. His books set in Carpathian Ruthenia are regarded as his best, reflecting his gift of combining documentary realism and fictional drama.

Fear of persecution drove him to the small town of Stříbřec during World War II. There he once again joined the Communist Party and was active in the resistance. He worked for a while in the Ministry of Information after the war. His writings during that period were limited to adaptations, including the retelling of Bible stories for children.

== Selected works ==
- Anna the Proletarian (Anna Proletářka)
- The Strange Friendship of Jesenius the Actor (Podivné přátelství herce Jesenia)
- Nikolai Schuhaj, Highwayman (Nikola Šuhaj loupežník)
- Grilled mirror (Zamřížované zrcadlo)

== Films ==
- Olbracht & Kolochava {2009}, director: Sergey Gubsky (Ukraine), Video on YouTube, Video on YouTube

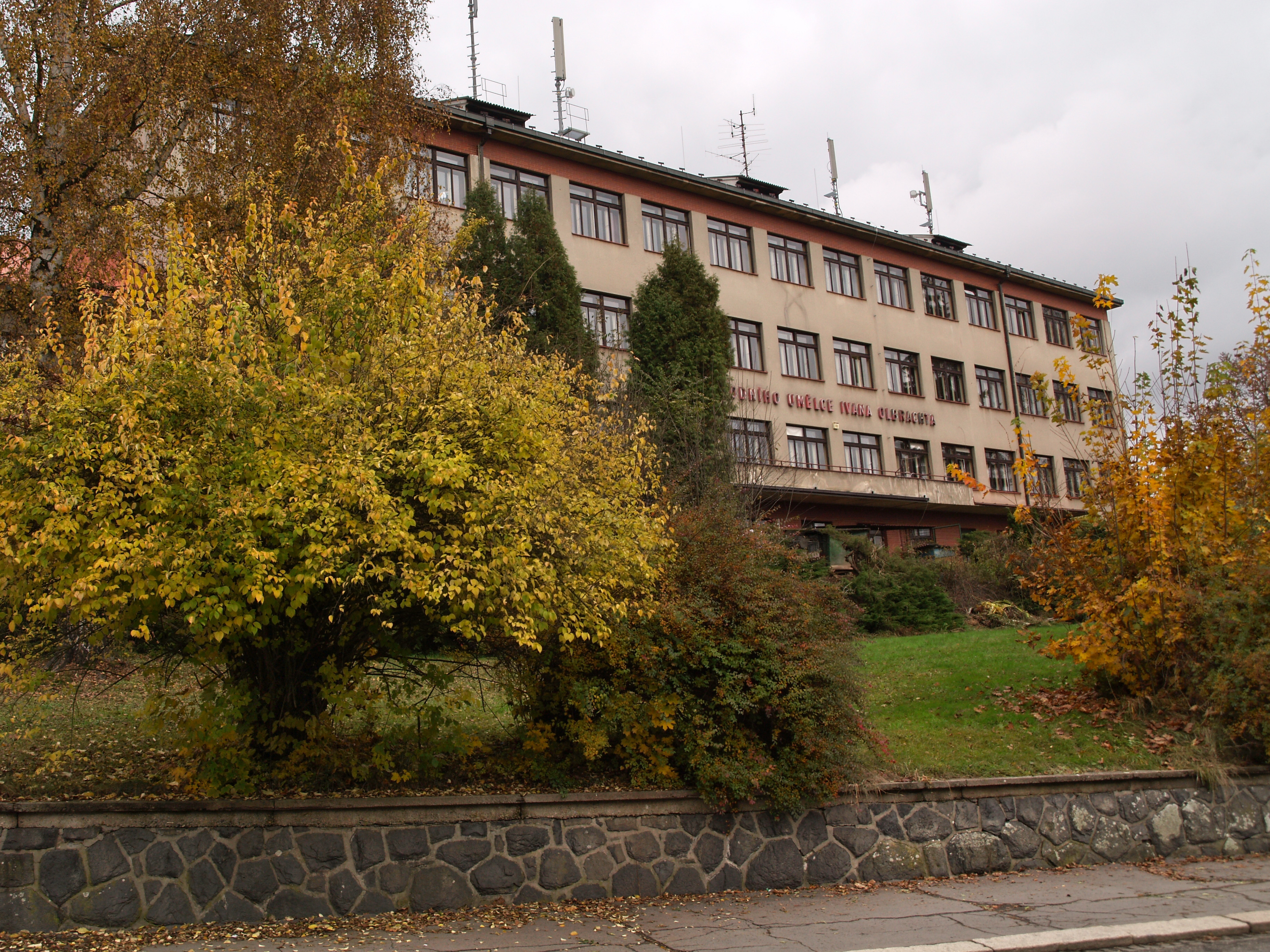
A school named after Olbracht in the Czech town of Semily.
