= Zlatá Olešnice (Jablonec nad Nisou District) =

- Municipality
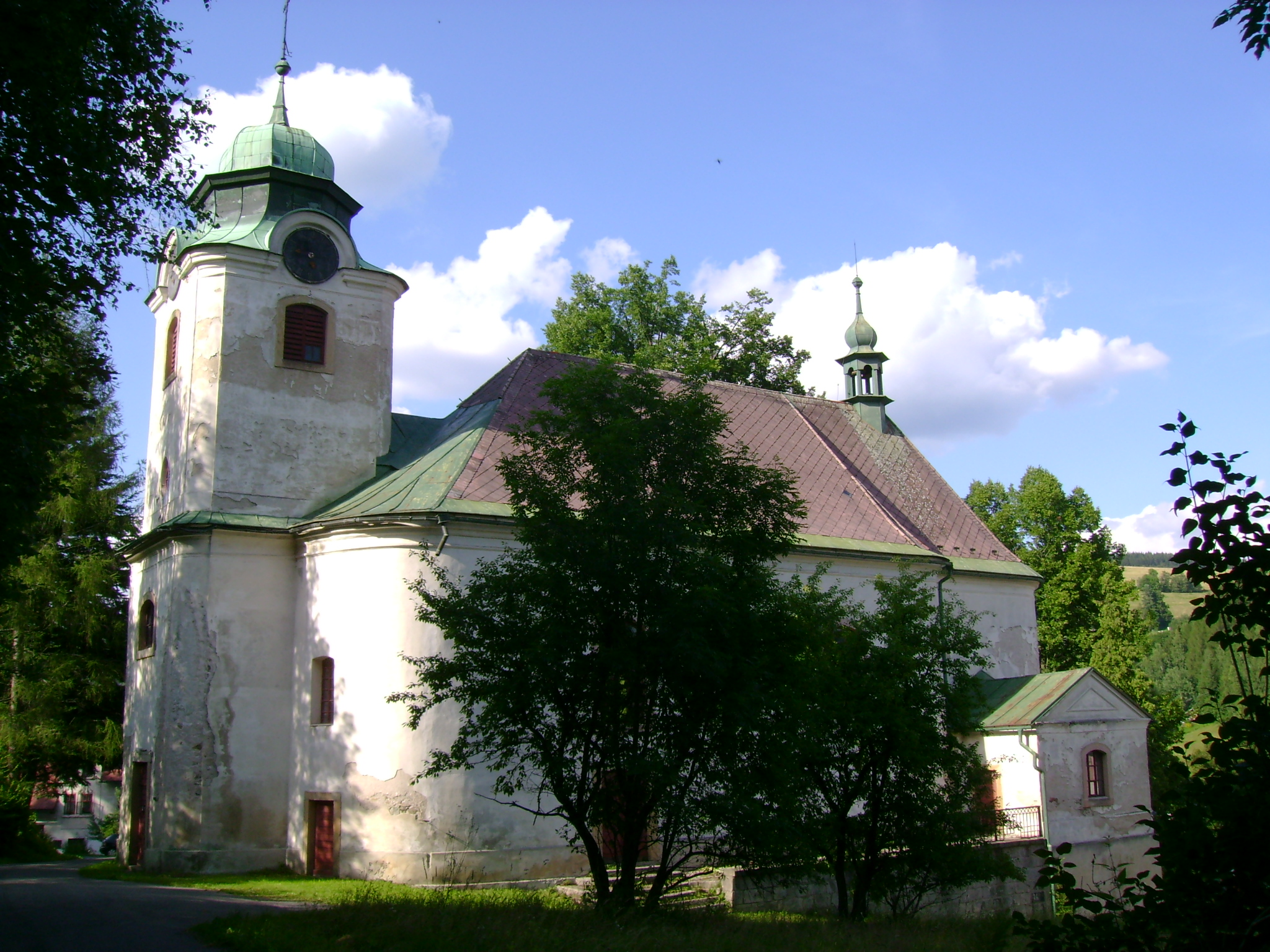
- Church of Saint Martin

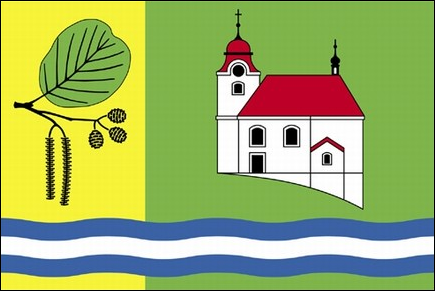
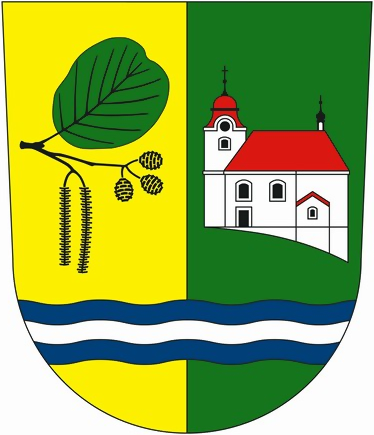
- Flag Coat of arms

- Location in the Czech Republic
- Coordinates: 50°42′31″N 15°21′13″E
- Country: Czech Republic
- Region: Liberec
- District: Jablonec nad Nisou
- First mentioned: 1352

Area
  - Total: 15.94 km^{2} (6.15 sq mi)
- Elevation: 535 m (1,755 ft)

Population (2026-01-01)
  - Total: 506
  - Density: 31.7/km^{2} (82.2/sq mi)
- Time zone: UTC+1 (CET)
  - Summer (DST): UTC+2 (CEST)
- Postal code: 468 47
- Website: www.zlata-olesnice.cz

Zlatá Olešnice is a municipality and village in Jablonec nad Nisou District in the Liberec Region of the Czech Republic. It has about 500 inhabitants.

== Administrative division ==
Zlatá Olešnice consists of four municipal parts (in brackets population according to the 2021 census):

- Zlatá Olešnice (423)
- Lhotka (37)
- Návarov (7)
- Stanový (29)

== Demographics ==
Historical population
Year	Pop.	±%
1869	2,224	—
1880	2,194	−1.3%
1890	2,022	−7.8%
1900	2,039	+0.8%
1910	1,788	−12.3%
1921	1,598	−10.6%
1930	1,488	−6.9%
1950	947	−36.4%
1961	814	−14.0%
1970	705	−13.4%
1980	612	−13.2%
1991	554	−9.5%
2001	531	−4.2%
2011	488	−8.1%
2021	496	+1.6%
Source: Censuses

== Notable people ==
- Antal Stašek (1843–1931), writer
- František Šimůnek (1910–1989), Nordic skier
- Helena Wilsonová (1937–2019), photographer
