= Nikola Šuhaj loupežník =

Czech novel by Ivan Olbracht

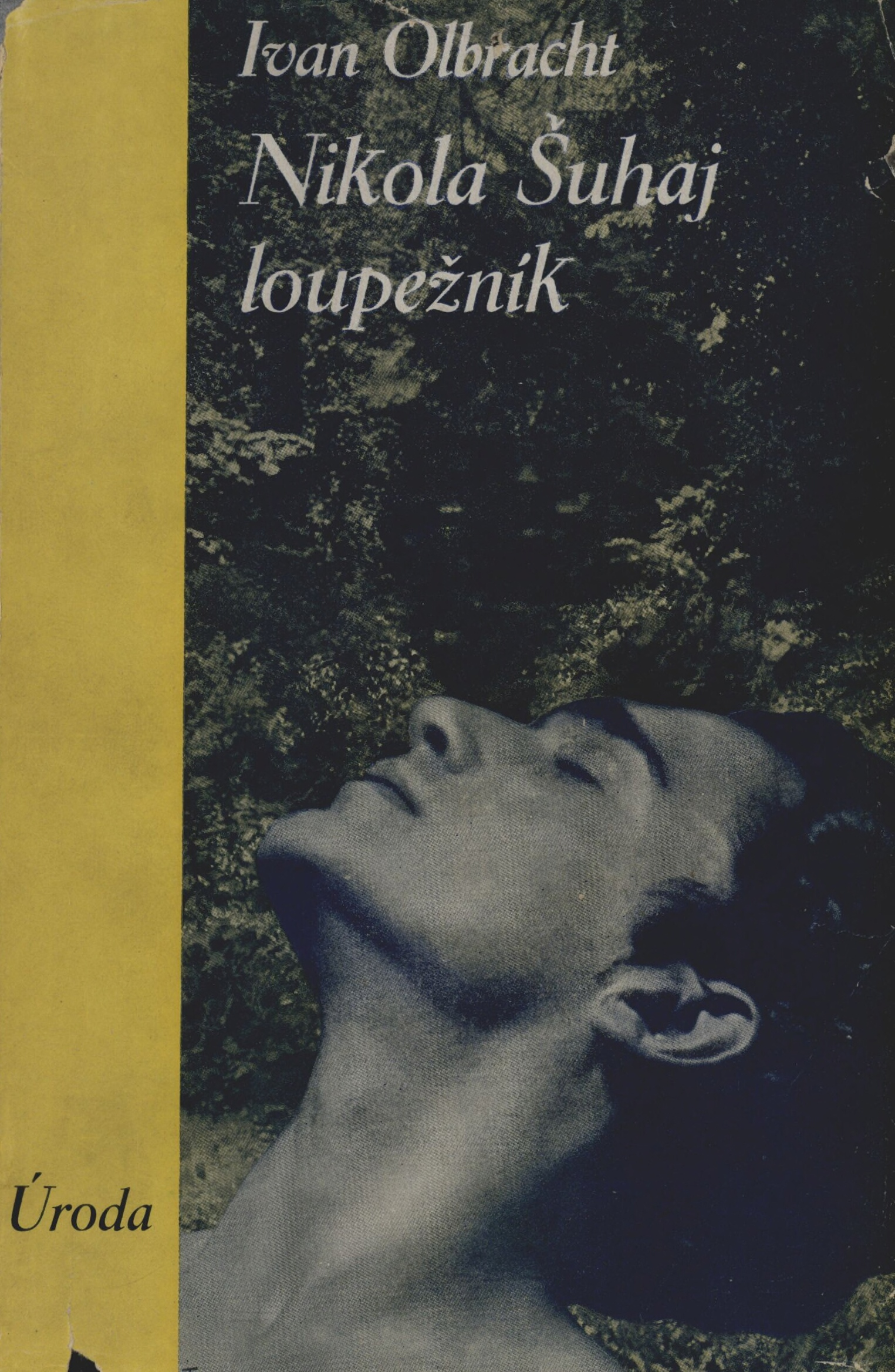
Nikola Šuhaj loupežník

Nikola Šuhaj loupežník is a Czech novel by Ivan Olbracht. It was first published in 1933.

The story takes place in Carpathian Ruthenia, especially after, but including the duration of the World War One.

== Plot ==
The whole story is set in Ruthenia. This region is forgotten, and people here are very poor and their only livelihood is the forests, where they say God lives and where there are a variety of enchanted places where even the wildlife won't approach. The novel writes two separate stories- the legend of Nikola and his real life - that blend together. The book is an allegory for legitimate justice and people's desire for freedom.

The plot of the book begins with the war, when the young Nikola Šuhaj and his German friend escape from a POW Camp and hide in the hut of a Russian woman. There, they concoct a potion that makes them bulletproof. On the second day, however, they discover that the Russian woman was a witch, kill her, and flee. They then go their separate ways, never to be seen again. After the war, Nikola returned home to his native village of Koločava, where he lives with Eržika, his girlfriend. After the war Kolocava is in ruins, and the people begin rioting, looting the local notary and Jewish shops, hoping to depose the mayor and establish a new order. The next day the government sends an armed escort of soldiers who establish order. At this moment, however, Nikola becomes the feared robber of legend. The government attempts to catch and apprehend him. Once a price is put on his head, however, a friend of his betrays him and kills him with an ax in a meadow. The friend never receives the reward promised. Nikola is buried at the cemetery of Koločava without tombstones and without a coffin, but his legend lives on in the local forests.
