= Helena Wilsonová =

Czech photographer

- Wilsonová in 2015
- Born: Helena Pospíšilová; 15 August 1937; Návarov, Czechoslovakia
- Died: 14 August 2019 (aged 81); Toronto, Canada
- Spouse: Paul Wilson
- Children: Jake Wilson

Helena Wilsonová (née Pospíšilová; 15 August 1937 – 14 August 2019) was a Czech photographer.

== BIography ==
Pospíšilová was born in the village of Návarov. After her family estate was confiscated by the state in 1948 (see 1948 Czechoslovak coup d'état), they moved to Prague, where she worked for the Academy of Sciences and also published her works in the Umění a řemesla magazine. In 1972, she married Canadian translator Paul Wilson. When Wilson was expelled from Czechoslovakia in 1977, they moved to Canada together.

She continued working as a photographer for art magazines, galleries and catalogues. One of her best-known works is a cycle of photographs taken in Cuba in 1995, later exhibited under the title The Faces of Havana. In 2011, a major exhibition of her photographs took place in Prague's Libri Prohibiti.

She died in Toronto a day before her 82nd birthday.
