= Ernest Maria Müller =

Czech bishop

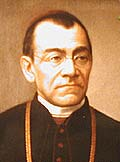
Ernest Maria Müller

Ernest Maria Müller (30 June 1822 in Jiřice u Miroslavi – 28 September 1888 in Linz) was a Czech clergyman and bishop for the Roman Catholic Diocese of Linz. He was ordained in 1846. He was appointed bishop in 1885.
