= Stříbřec =

- Municipality
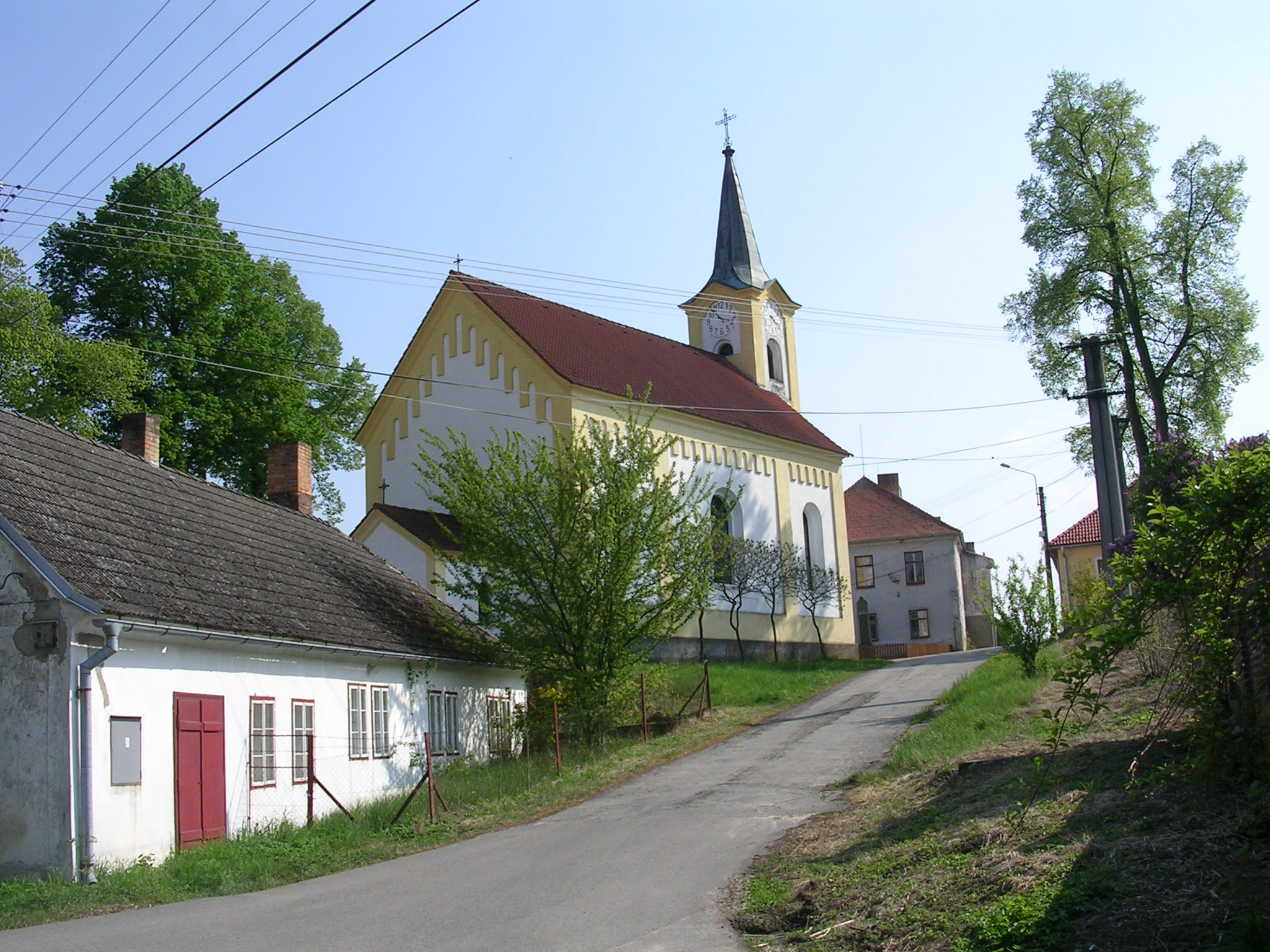
- Church of Saint John of Nepomuk

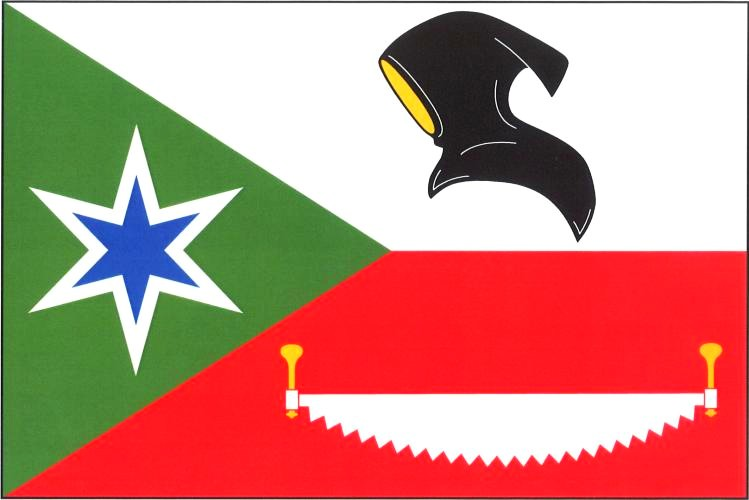
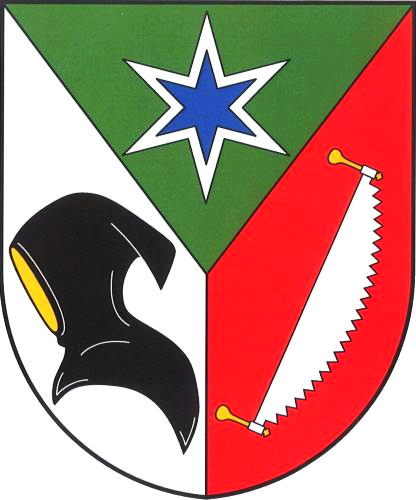
- Flag Coat of arms

- Location in the Czech Republic
- Coordinates: 49°1′48″N 14°52′42″E
- Country: Czech Republic
- Region: South Bohemian
- District: Jindřichův Hradec
- First mentioned: 1370

Area
  - Total: 18.96 km^{2} (7.32 sq mi)
- Elevation: 442 m (1,450 ft)

Population (2026-01-01)
  - Total: 419
  - Density: 22.1/km^{2} (57.2/sq mi)
- Time zone: UTC+1 (CET)
  - Summer (DST): UTC+2 (CEST)
- Postal codes: 378 18, 379 01
- Website: www.stribrec.cz

Stříbřec is a municipality and village in Jindřichův Hradec District in the South Bohemian Region of the Czech Republic. It has about 400 inhabitants.

Stříbřec lies approximately 17 kilometres (11 mi) south-west of Jindřichův Hradec, 30 km (19 mi) east of České Budějovice, and 123 km (76 mi) south of Prague.

== Administrative division ==
Stříbřec consists of three municipal parts (in brackets population according to the 2021 census):

- Stříbřec (246)
- Libořezy (72)
- Mníšek (134)

== Demographics ==
Historical population
Year	Pop.	±%
1869	1,437	—
1880	1,584	+10.2%
1890	1,566	−1.1%
1900	1,567	+0.1%
1910	1,547	−1.3%
1921	1,449	−6.3%
1930	1,340	−7.5%
1950	962	−28.2%
1961	947	−1.6%
1970	758	−20.0%
1980	635	−16.2%
1991	492	−22.5%
2001	423	−14.0%
2011	441	+4.3%
2021	452	+2.5%
Source: Censuses
