= Jiřice (Nymburk District) =

- Municipality
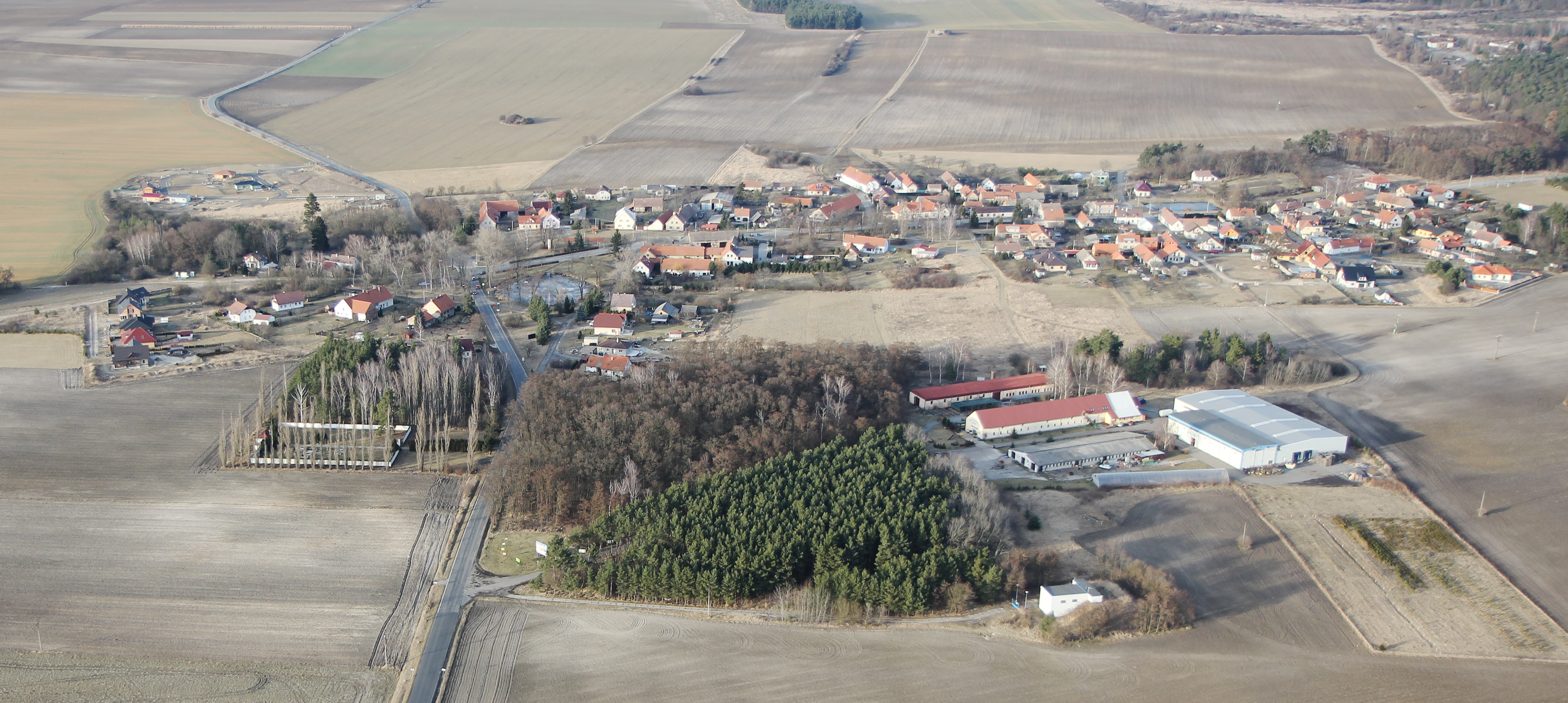
- Aerial view

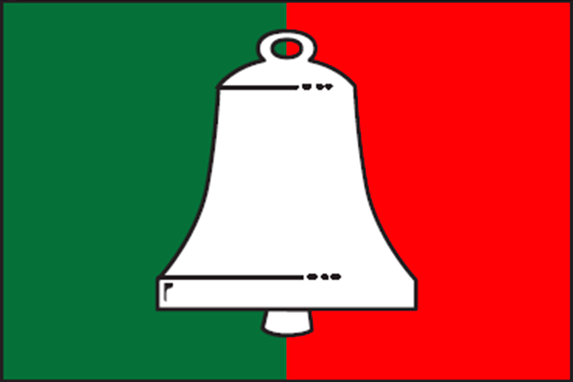
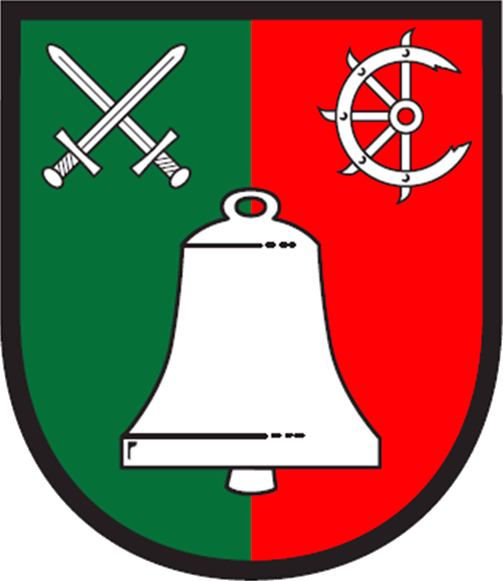
- Flag Coat of arms

- Location in the Czech Republic
- Coordinates: 50°15′9″N 14°50′13″E
- Country: Czech Republic
- Region: Central Bohemian
- District: Nymburk
- First mentioned: 1479

Area
  - Total: 8.37 km^{2} (3.23 sq mi)
- Elevation: 247 m (810 ft)

Population (2026-01-01)
  - Total: 325
  - Density: 38.8/km^{2} (101/sq mi)
- Time zone: UTC+1 (CET)
  - Summer (DST): UTC+2 (CEST)
- Postal code: 289 22
- Website: www.obecjirice.cz

Jiřice is a municipality and village in Nymburk District in the Central Bohemian Region of the Czech Republic. It has about 300 inhabitants.

== Demographics ==
Historical population
Year	Pop.	±%
1869	272	—
1880	312	+14.7%
1890	334	+7.1%
1900	392	+17.4%
1910	450	+14.8%
1921	460	+2.2%
1930	428	−7.0%
1950	174	−59.3%
1961	166	−4.6%
1970	178	+7.2%
1980	166	−6.7%
1991	130	−21.7%
2001	135	+3.8%
2011	581	+330.4%
2021	1,094	+88.3%
Source: Censuses

== Economy ==
The Jiřice Prison is the main employer in Jiřice. It is classified as a low-, medium- and high-security prison for men with a capacity of 766 prisoners. It employs more than 250 people.
