= Jiřice u Moravských Budějovic =

- Municipality
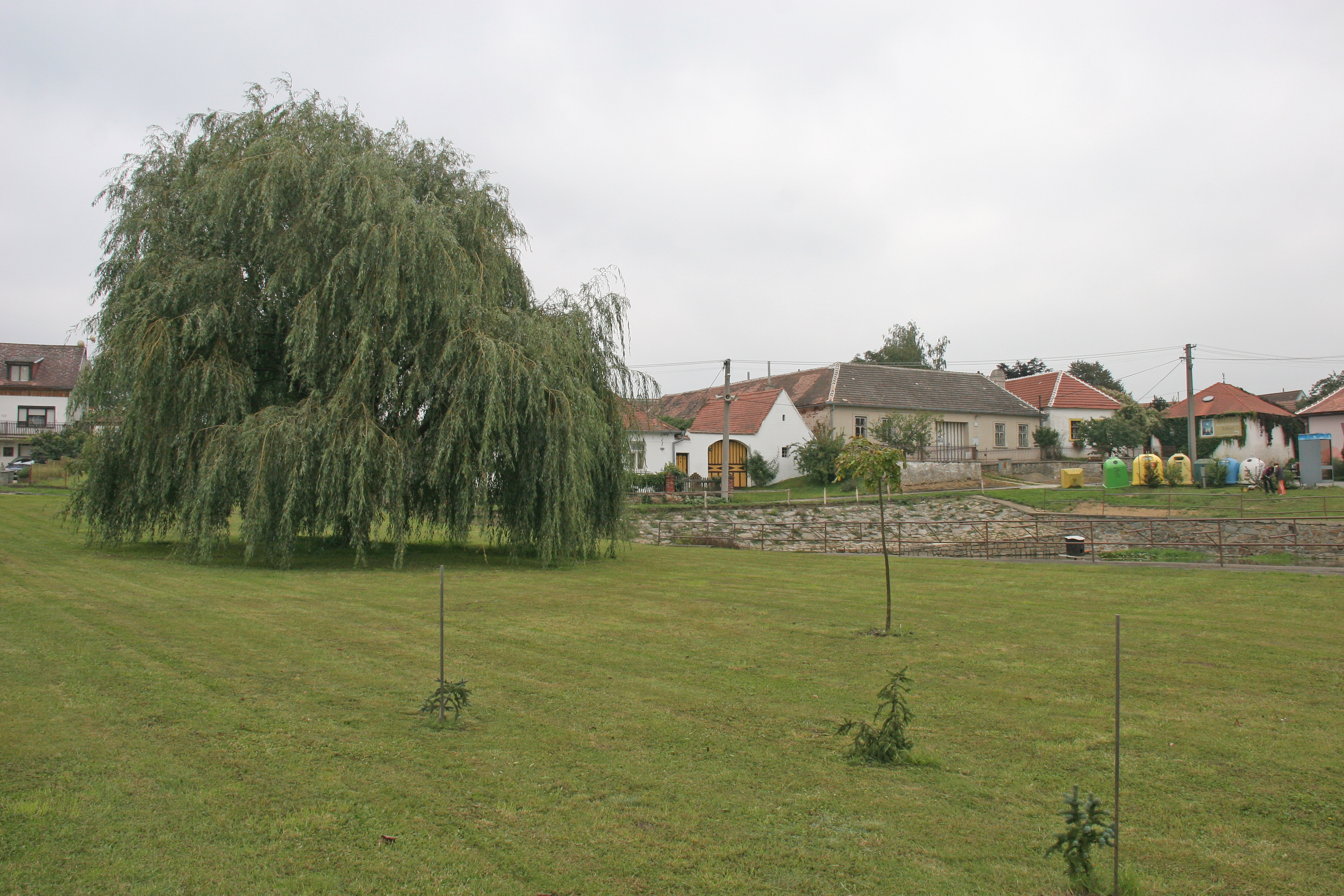
- Centre of Jiřice u Moravských Budějovic

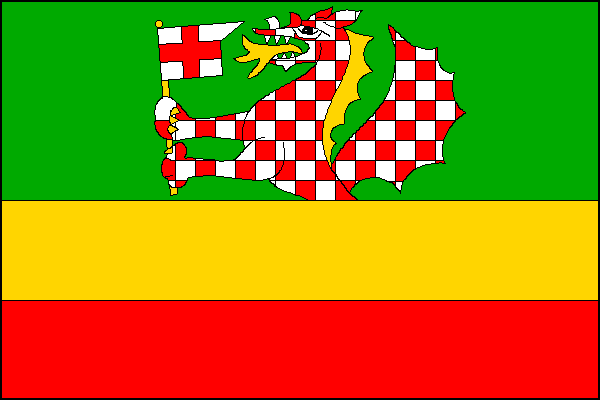
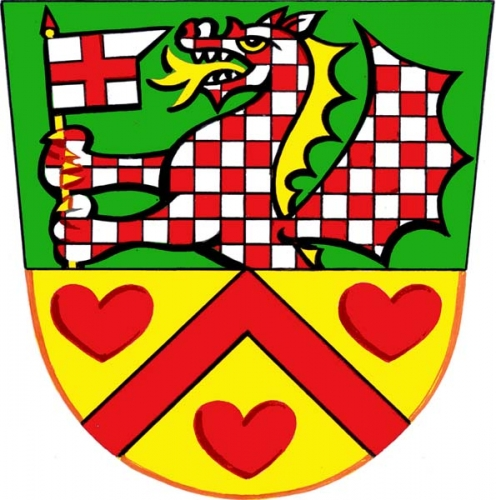
- Flag Coat of arms

- Location in the Czech Republic
- Coordinates: 48°59′38″N 15°55′31″E
- Country: Czech Republic
- Region: South Moravian
- District: Znojmo
- First mentioned: 1349

Area
  - Total: 3.84 km^{2} (1.48 sq mi)
- Elevation: 382 m (1,253 ft)

Population (2026-01-01)
  - Total: 59
  - Density: 15/km^{2} (40/sq mi)
- Time zone: UTC+1 (CET)
  - Summer (DST): UTC+2 (CEST)
- Postal code: 671 54
- Website: www.jiriceumb.cz

Jiřice u Moravských Budějovic is a municipality and village in Znojmo District in the South Moravian Region of the Czech Republic. It has about 60 inhabitants.

Jiřice u Moravských Budějovic lies approximately 18 kilometres (11 mi) north-west of Znojmo, 56 km (35 mi) south-west of Brno, and 163 km (101 mi) south-east of Prague.

== Demographics ==
Historical population
Year	Pop.	±%
1869	127	—
1880	131	+3.1%
1890	147	+12.2%
1900	162	+10.2%
1910	160	−1.2%
1921	142	−11.3%
1930	140	−1.4%
1950	112	−20.0%
1961	136	+21.4%
1970	126	−7.4%
1980	99	−21.4%
1991	65	−34.3%
2001	54	−16.9%
2011	59	+9.3%
2021	52	−11.9%
Source: Censuses
