= Jiřice u Miroslavi =

- Municipality
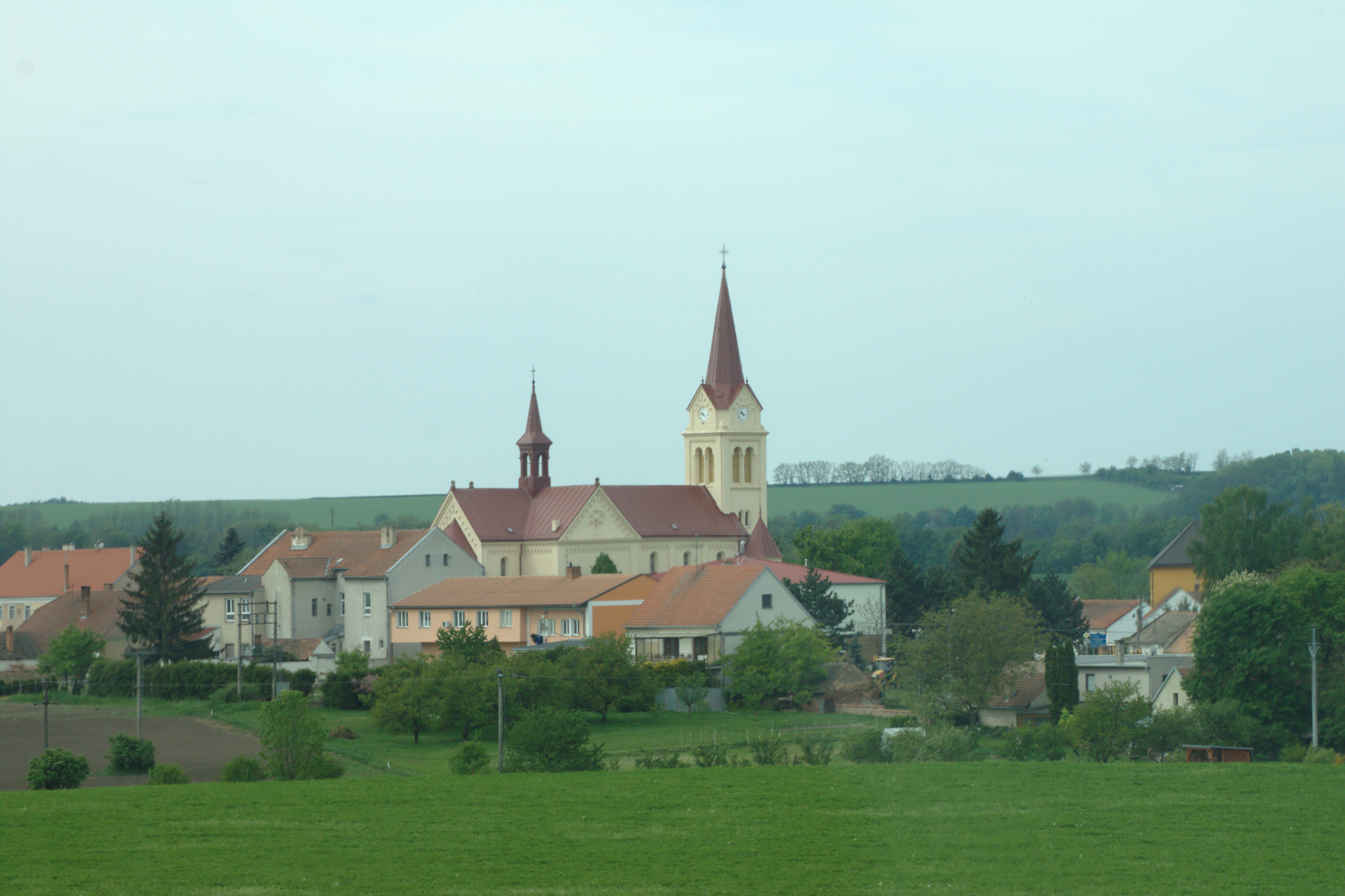
- Church of Saint Anne

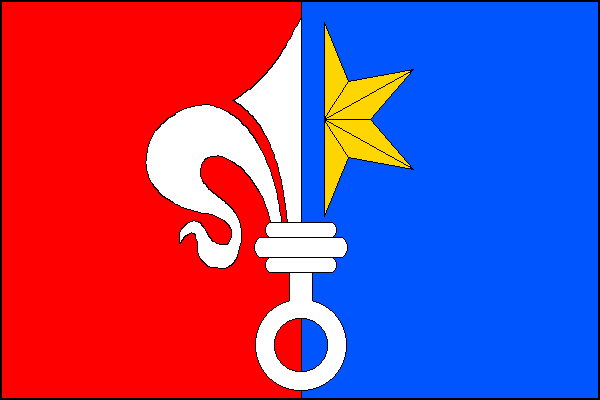
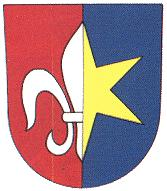
- Flag Coat of arms

- Location in the Czech Republic
- Coordinates: 48°55′15″N 16°23′31″E
- Country: Czech Republic
- Region: South Moravian
- District: Znojmo
- First mentioned: 1385

Area
  - Total: 8.53 km^{2} (3.29 sq mi)
- Elevation: 198 m (650 ft)

Population (2026-01-01)
  - Total: 472
  - Density: 55.3/km^{2} (143/sq mi)
- Time zone: UTC+1 (CET)
  - Summer (DST): UTC+2 (CEST)
- Postal code: 671 78
- Website: www.jirice.cz

Jiřice u Miroslavi is a municipality and village in Znojmo District in the South Moravian Region of the Czech Republic. It has about 500 inhabitants.

Jiřice u Miroslavi lies approximately 28 kilometres (17 mi) east of Znojmo, 35 km (22 mi) south-west of Brno, and 193 km (120 mi) south-east of Prague.

== Demographics ==
Historical population
Year	Pop.	±%
1869	659	—
1880	748	+13.5%
1890	661	−11.6%
1900	719	+8.8%
1910	684	−4.9%
1921	711	+3.9%
1930	708	−0.4%
1950	424	−40.1%
1961	397	−6.4%
1970	393	−1.0%
1980	387	−1.5%
1991	402	+3.9%
2001	425	+5.7%
2011	423	−0.5%
2021	451	+6.6%
Source: Censuses

== Notable people ==
- Ernest Maria Müller (1822–1888), bishop
