= Řendějov =

- Municipality
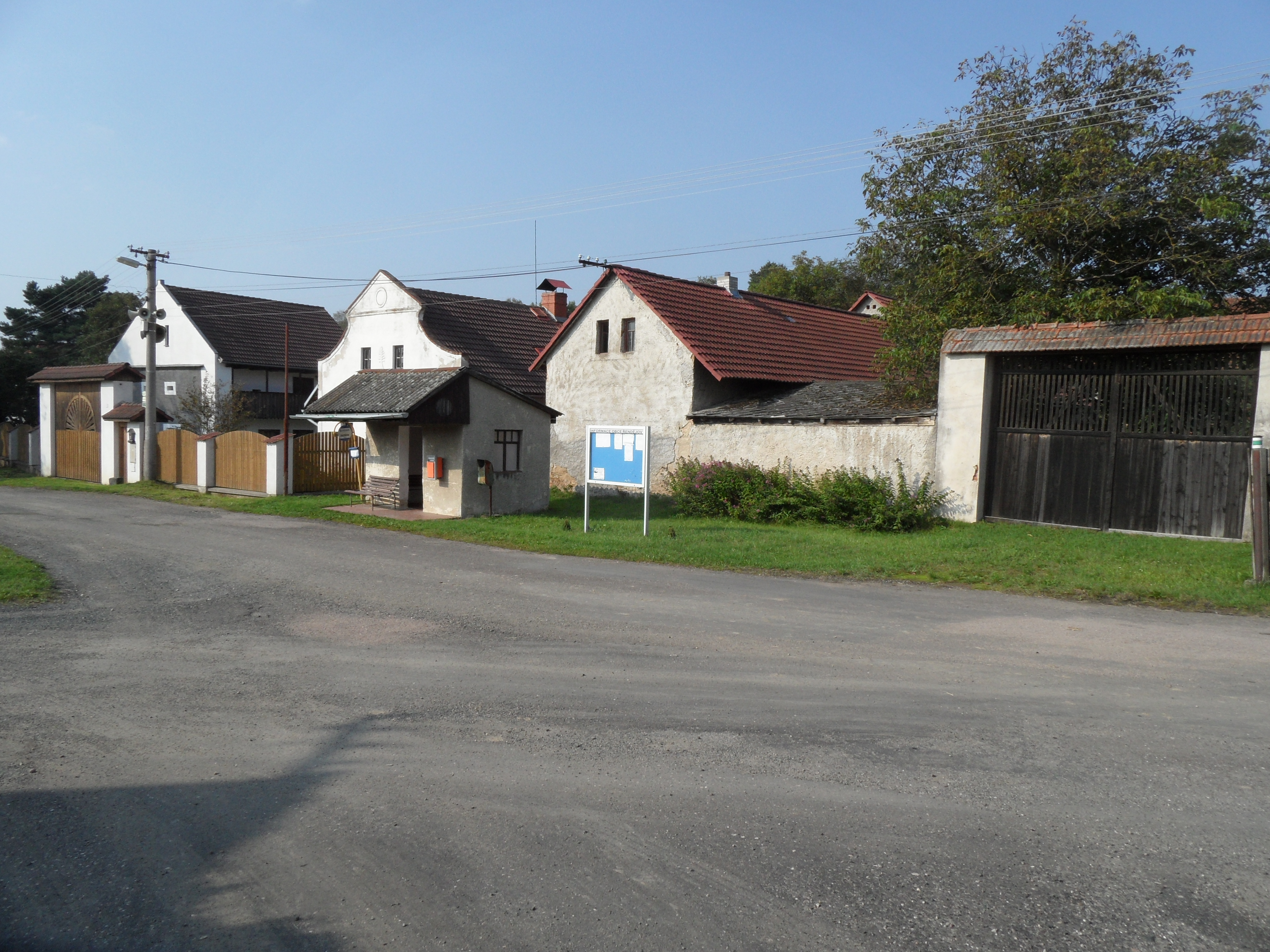
- Crossroads in Řendějov

- Location in the Czech Republic
- Coordinates: 49°46′4″N 15°4′50″E
- Country: Czech Republic
- Region: Central Bohemian
- District: Kutná Hora
- First mentioned: 1380

Area
  - Total: 8.40 km^{2} (3.24 sq mi)
- Elevation: 458 m (1,503 ft)

Population (2026-01-01)
  - Total: 252
  - Density: 30.0/km^{2} (77.7/sq mi)
- Time zone: UTC+1 (CET)
  - Summer (DST): UTC+2 (CEST)
- Postal code: 285 22
- Website: www.rendejov.kh.cz

Řendějov is a municipality and village in Kutná Hora District in the Central Bohemian Region of the Czech Republic. It has about 300 inhabitants.

== Administrative division ==
Řendějov consists of four municipal parts (in brackets population according to the 2021 census):

- Řendějov (29)
- Jiřice (91)
- Nový Samechov (56)
- Starý Samechov (39)

== Demographics ==
Historical population
Year	Pop.	±%
1869	715	—
1880	684	−4.3%
1890	611	−10.7%
1900	648	+6.1%
1910	589	−9.1%
1921	587	−0.3%
1930	503	−14.3%
1950	419	−16.7%
1961	412	−1.7%
1970	354	−14.1%
1980	315	−11.0%
1991	275	−12.7%
2001	258	−6.2%
2011	248	−3.9%
2021	215	−13.3%
Source: Censuses
