= Kolochava =

Kolochava Колочава
- Village
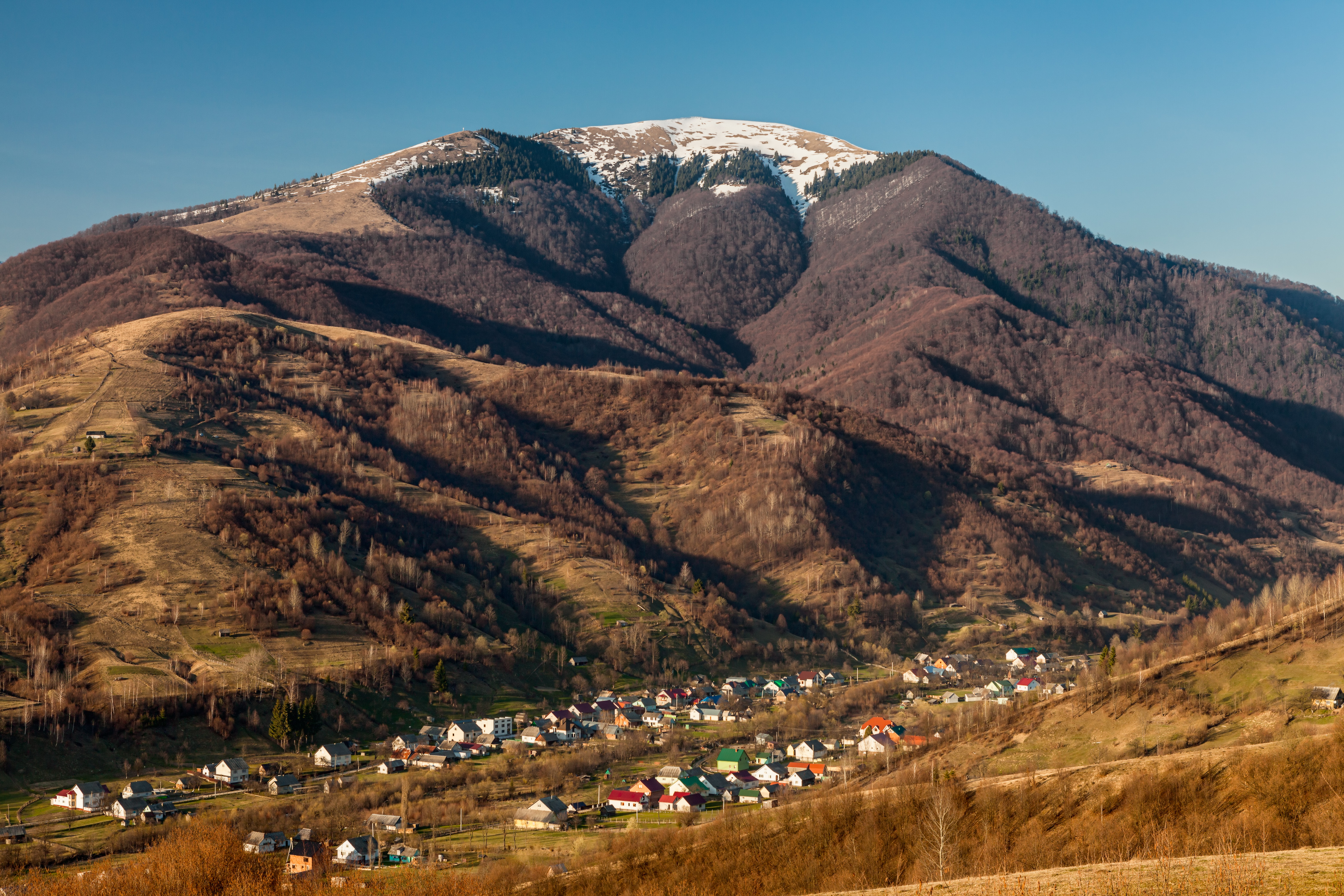

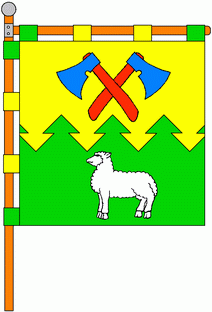
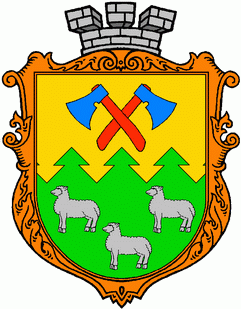
- Flag Coat of arms
- Interactive map of Kolochava
- Location within Zakarpattia Oblast Location within Ukraine
- Coordinates: 48°26′12″N 23°44′1″E
- Country: Ukraine
- Oblast: Zakarpattia Oblast
- Raion: Khust Raion
- Hromada: Kolochava rural hromada
- Population (2001): 5,026

Kolochava (Ukrainian: Колочава) is a village in Khust Raion, Zakarpattia Oblast, Ukraine.

Kolochava was previously located in Mizhhiria Raion until it was abolished and its territory was merged into Khust Raion on 18 July 2020 as part of the administrative reform of Ukraine, which reduced the number of raions of Zakarpattia Oblast to six.

From 1976 to 1992, it had the status of an urban-type settlement, but it was demoted to village status on 6 March 1992.

The village is ethnically Rusyn.
