= Scandinavian design =

20th-century design movement

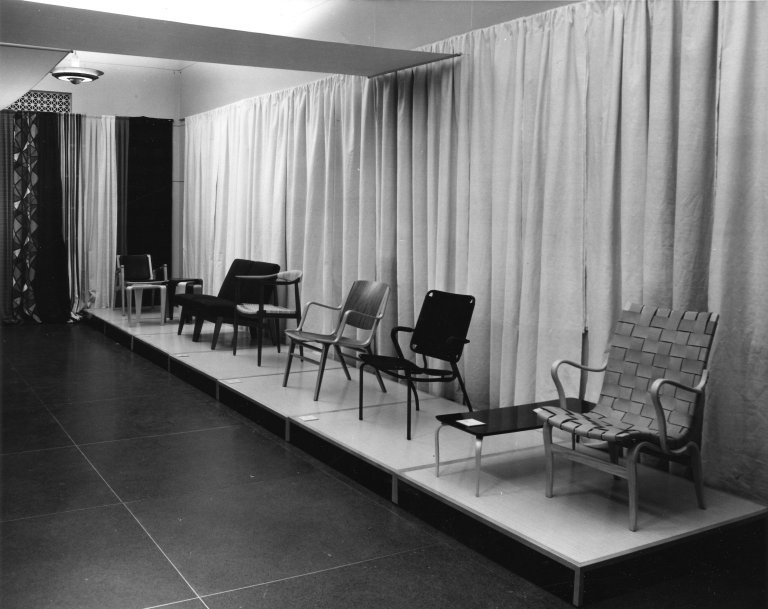
The Brooklyn Museum's 1954 "Design in Scandinavia" exhibition launched "Scandinavian Modern" furniture on the American market.

Scandinavian design is a design movement characterized by simplicity, minimalism and functionality that emerged in the early 20th century, and subsequently flourished in the 1950s throughout the five Nordic countries: Denmark, Finland, Norway, Sweden, and Iceland.

Scandinavian designers are known especially for household goods including furniture, textiles, ceramics, lamps, and glass, but Scandinavian design has been extended to industrial design of products such as consumer electronics, mobile phones, and cars.

== Overview ==
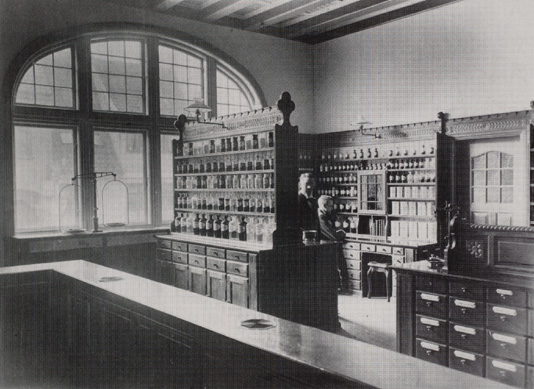
Skønvirke in architecture: Roskilde's Swan Apothecary (1899)

In 1914, the Danish Selskabet for Dekorativ Kunst (Company for Decorative Arts) launched its Skønvirke^{da} (literally "Graceful Work") magazine. Its title became the name of a new Danish style of arts and crafts, both in objects and in architecture, to rival Art Nouveau and Jugendstil.

From the 1930s, designers such as Alvar Aalto (architecture, furniture, textiles), Arne Jacobsen (chairs), Borge Mogensen (furniture), Hans J. Wegner (chairs), Verner Panton (plastic chairs), Poul Henningsen (lamps), and Maija Isola (printed textiles) helped to create a "golden age of Scandinavian design".

Scandinavian textile artists became known for their pile rugs early in the 20th century, while brightly-coloured Scandinavian textiles became popular across the western world after the Second World War.

The Lunning Prize, awarded to outstanding Scandinavian designers between 1951 and 1970, was instrumental in making Scandinavian design a recognized commodity, and in defining its profile.

In 1954, the Brooklyn Museum held its "Design in Scandinavia" exhibition, and a fashion for "Scandinavian Modern" furniture began in America. Scandinavian design is by no means limited to furniture and household goods. It has been applied to industrial design, such as of consumer electronics, mobile phones, and cars.

The concept of Scandinavian design has been the subject of scholarly debate, exhibitions and marketing agendas since the 1950s. Many emphasize the democratic design ideals that were a central theme of the movement and are reflected in the rhetoric surrounding contemporary Scandinavian and international design. Others, however, have analyzed the reception of Scandinavian design abroad, seeing in it a form of myth-making and racial politics.

== In the Nordic nations ==
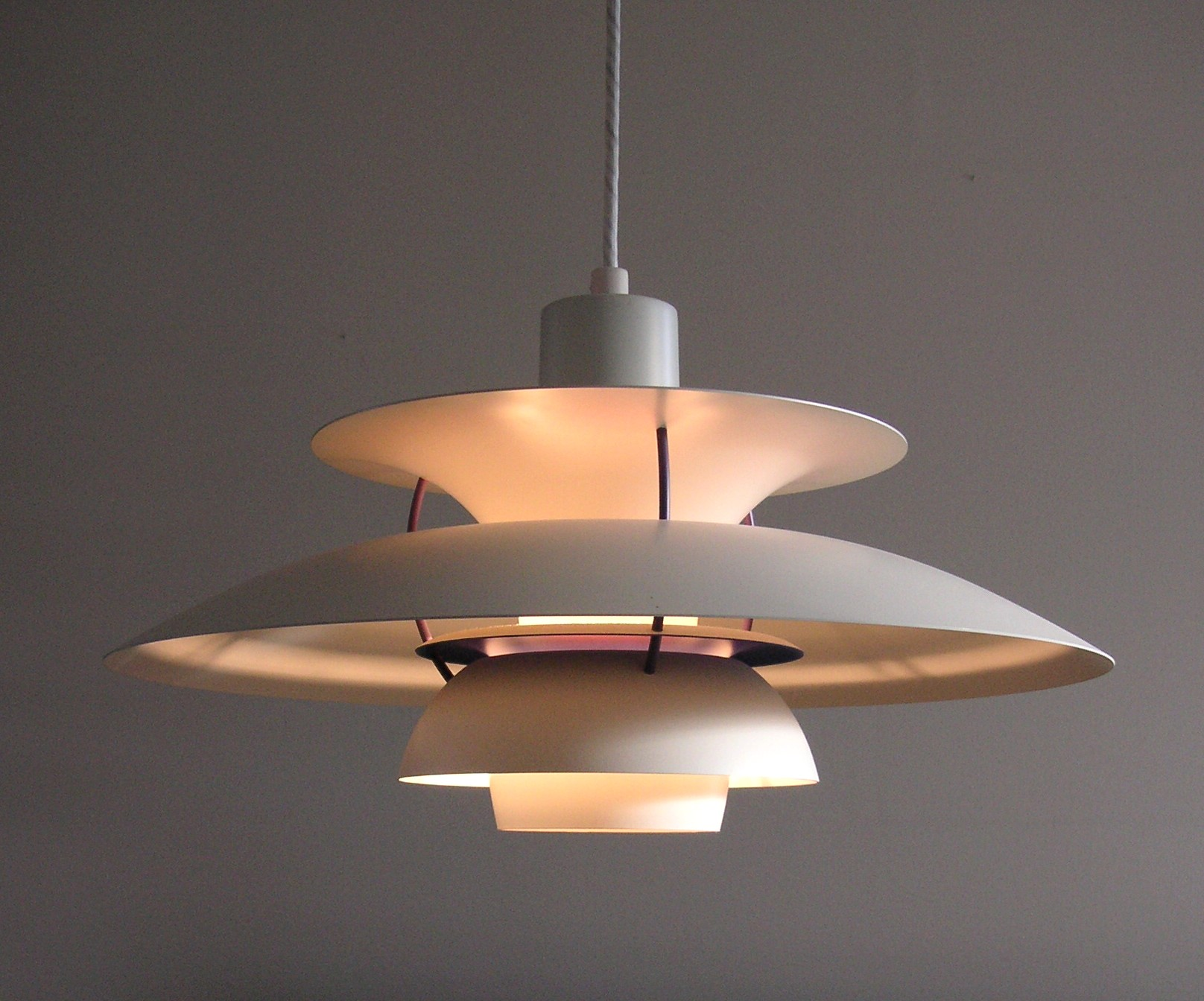
PH-lamp (1958 version), Denmark

=== In Denmark ===
Danish Design is a style of functionalistic design and architecture that was developed in mid-20th century. Influenced by the German Bauhaus school, many Danish designers used the new industrial technologies, combined with ideas of simplicity and functionalism to design buildings, furniture and household objects, many of which have become iconic and are still in use and production, such as Arne Jacobsen's 1958 Egg chair and Poul Henningsen's 1926 PH-lamps. After the Second World War, conditions in Denmark were ideally suited to success in design. The emphasis was on furniture but architecture, silver, ceramics, glass and textiles also benefitted from the trend. Denmark's late industrialisation combined with a tradition of high-quality craftsmanship formed the basis of gradual progress towards industrial production.

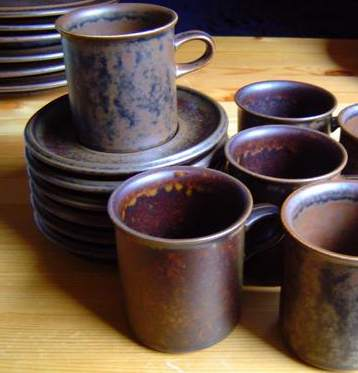
Ceramic series Ruska designed by Ulla Procopé for Arabia, Finland

=== In Finland ===
Finnish design spans clothing, engineering design, furniture, glass, lighting, textiles, and household products. The "Design from Finland" mark was created in 2011. Finland's Design Museum (formerly called the Museum of Art and Design) has a collection founded in 1873, while Helsinki's University of Art and Design, established in 1871, now forms part of Aalto University.

Prominent Finnish designers include Alvar Aalto (vases, furniture), Aino Aalto (glassware), Kaj Franck (glass, tableware), Klaus Haapaniemi (fabric prints), Simo Heikkilä (furniture), Kristina Isola (textiles), Maija Isola (Marimekko prints), Harri Koskinen (glass, homeware), Mika Piirainen^{fi} (clothing, accessories), Timo Sarpaneva (glass, homeware), Oiva Toikka (glass art), Tapio Wirkkala (glass art, glassware), Eero Aarnio (plastic furniture), Sanna Annukka^{fi} (screenprints), Anu Penttinen^{fi} (glass), Aino-Maija Metsola^{fi} (textiles, homeware), and Maija Louekari^{fi} (tableware, homeware).

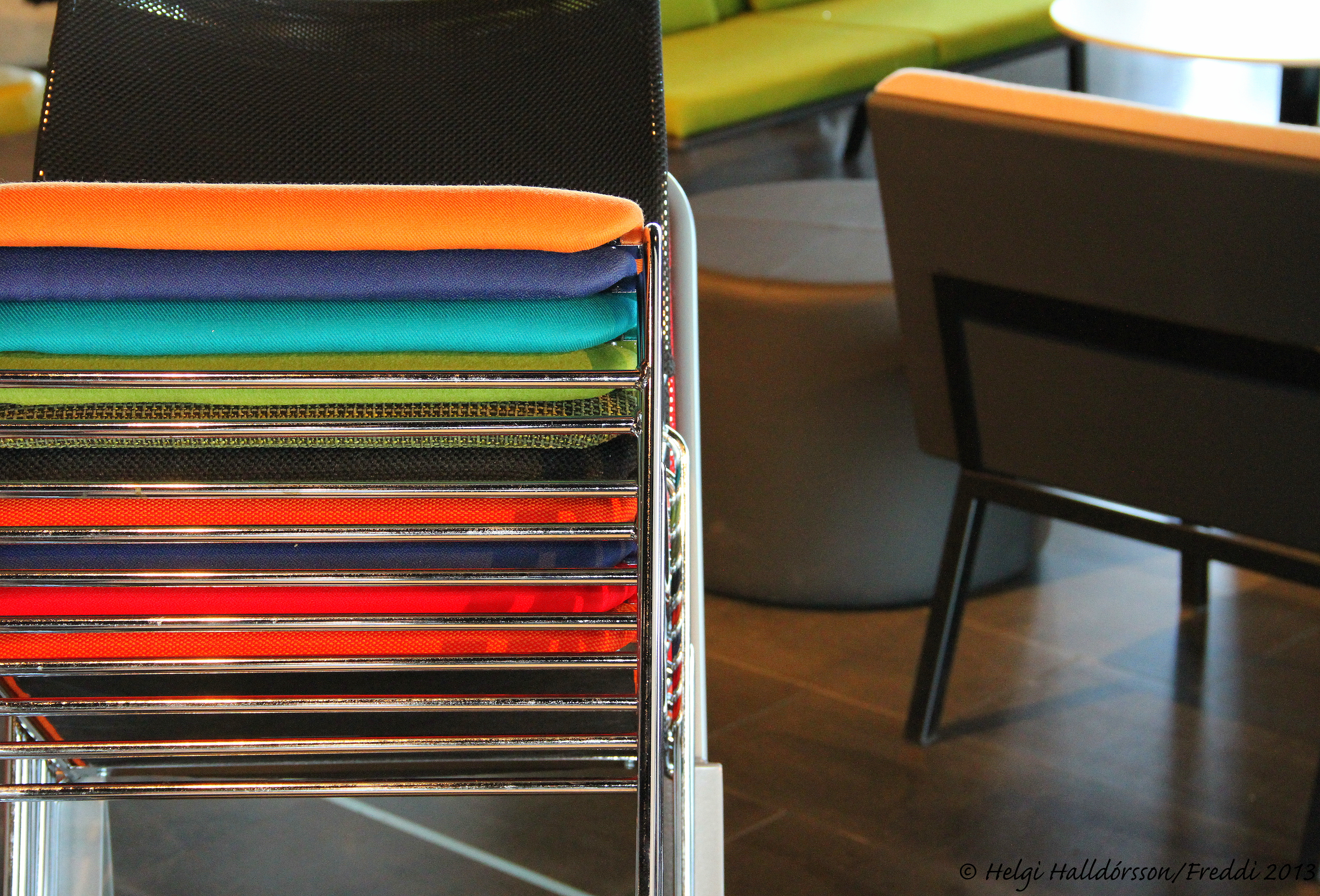
Stacking chairs, Iceland

=== In Iceland ===
Design in Iceland is a relatively young tradition, starting in the 1950s but now growing rapidly. The country's limited options for manufacturing and its constrained choice of materials have both forced designers to be innovative, though wool remains a staple material, whether felted or knitted. Iceland's Museum of Design and Applied Art, aiming to record Icelandic design from 1900 onwards, opened in 1998. The Iceland Academy of the Arts was also founded in 1998, soon followed by its Faculty of Architecture and Design, which has promoted a distinctively Icelandic character in the nation's design.

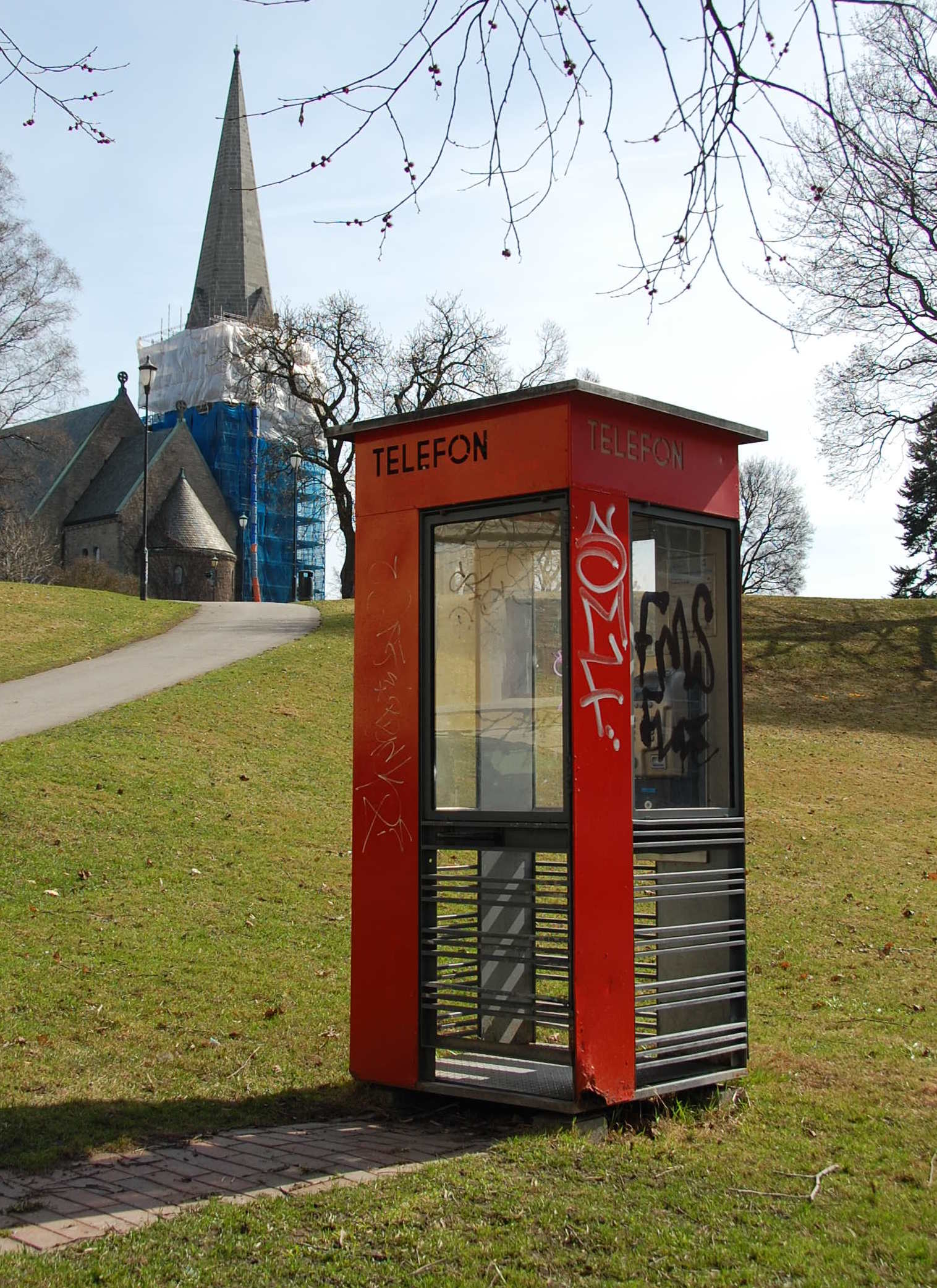
Telephone Kiosk by Georg Fredrik Fasting, Norway

=== In Norway ===
Norwegian design has a strong minimalist aesthetic. Designed items include lamps and furniture. Qualities emphasised include durability, beauty, functionality, simplicity, and natural forms.

The Norwegian Centre for Design and Architecture, "DogA", is housed in a former transformer station in Oslo. Norway holds an annual design exhibition called "100% Norway" at the London Design Fair.

Prominent Norwegian furniture designers include Hans Brattrud, Sven Ivar Dysthe, Olav Eldøy, Olav Haug, Fredrik A. Kayser, and Ingmar Relling.

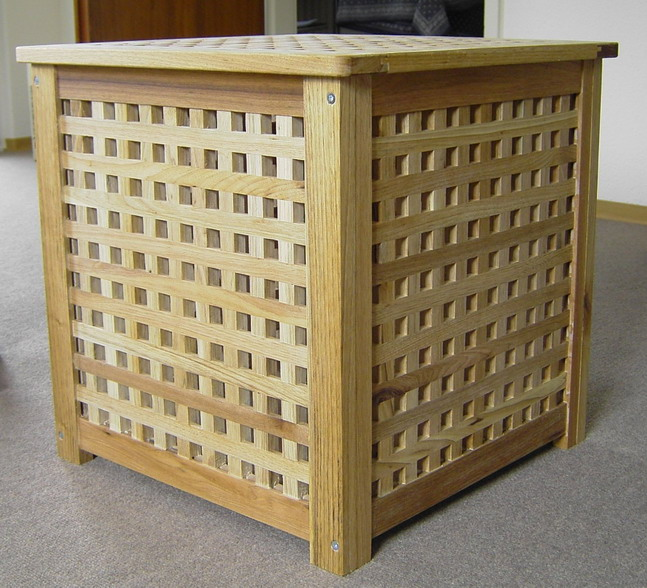
"HOL" furniture for IKEA, Sweden

=== In Sweden ===
Swedish design is considered minimalist, with an emphasis on functionality and simple clean lines. This has applied especially to furniture. Sweden is known for traditional crafts including glass and Sami handicrafts. Swedish design was pioneered by Anders Beckman^{sv} (graphics), Bruno Mathsson (furniture), Märta Måås-Fjetterström and Astrid Sampe (textiles), and Sixten Sason (industrial design).

Organisations that promote design in Sweden include Svensk Form^{sv}, the Swedish Society of Crafts and Design, founded in 1845; the Swedish Industrial Design Foundation^{sv}, known as SVID; the Swedish Arts Council; and the Swedish Centre for Architecture and Design (known as ArkDes) on the island of Skeppsholmen in Stockholm, beside the Moderna Museet.
