= Design House Stockholm =

Swedish design publisher and retailer

- Company type: Privately held
- Industry: Design, retail
- Founded: January 29, 1992
- Founder: Anders Färdig
- Headquarters: Stadsgården 6, 10th floor, 116 45 Stockholm, Sweden
- Key people: founder & CEO: Anders Färdig
- Products: Furniture, Lighting, Fashion, Tableware
- Revenue: ▲102 million SEK (2013)
- Number of employees: 45 (2013)
- Website: designhousestockholm.com

Design House Stockholm is a design production and retail company, self described as a 'publisher of design,' for Scandinavian design, including Scandinavian modern.

== History ==
Design House Stockholm was founded in 1992 by Anders Färdig, who had previously owned the brands Höganäs and Boda Nova. Using his vast knowledge in design management from prior experience managing Boda Nova and Höganäs, Färdig created a network of independent designers that remains the platform from which Design House Stockholm operates today. In 1997 the Design House Stockholm product collection was launched, starting with Harri Koskinen's Block Lamp that immediately became a worldwide success Harri Koskinen’s Block Lamp designed in 1996 - which still remains among Design House Stockholm's best-selling products, and have won several awards.

Design House Stockholm has distinguished itself as a publisher of design, similar to the way publishing houses work with authors, rather than an average producer that selects a designer to design a specific product. The company lets designers present their personal ideas, of which some are selected for production. The company’s CEO Anders Färdig says Design House Stockholm’s ambition is to be a mirror of notable Scandinavian design today the term ‘Scandinavian’ referring to a philosophic and aesthetic perspective, rather than geography and nationality. Färdig also points out that: "We are a product dropper, not a name-dropper". This is not a political statement; it is a philosophy.

The company has been represented in MoMA’s permanent collection by Harri Koskinen’s Block Lamp since 2000.

== Designers ==
Over 60 independent designers are represented in the company’s collection; including internationally known names such as Claesson Koivisto Rune, Form Us With Love, Harri Koskinen and Timo Sarpaneva. The company also has distinguished itself by often choosing young, promising designers in addition to more established names, such as Family Chairs by Lina Nordqvist, "Toupie" salt & pepper shakers by Jessika Källeskog and not least "Block Lamp" by Harri Koskinen.

The Elsa Beskow Collection

In 2013, Design House Stockholm launched a collection for the kitchen based on Elsa Beskow’s illustrations. The collection was designed by Catharina Kippel and launched in collaboration with Bonnier Group.

== Retail shops ==
Design House Stockholm currently has eight concept shops within retail stores: Nordiska Kompaniet in Stockholm and Gothenburg; Selfridges, Oxford Street in London, Frankfurt, Jönköping, and Båstad; Zinc Details in San Francisco; and Urban Home in Bangkok.

Design House Stockholm's products are also on sale at prominent design stores such as Museum of Modern Art in New York and Conran Shop in London and Paris.

== See also ==
- Design companies of Sweden
- Modernist architecture in Scandinavia
