= Höganäs =

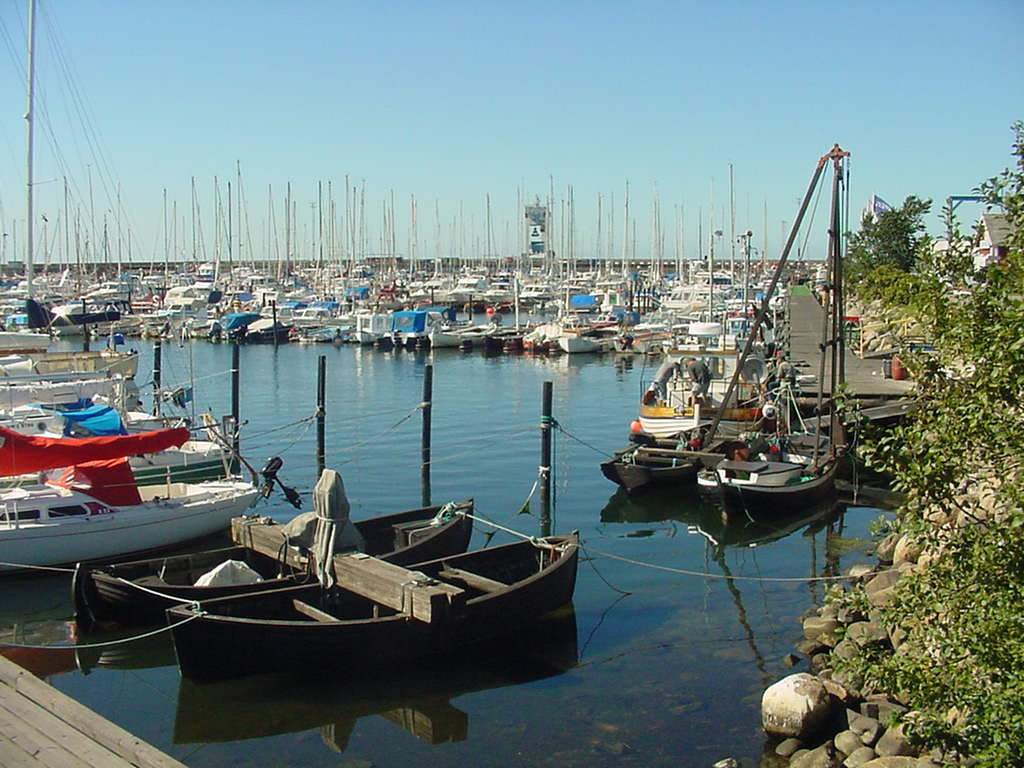
- Höganäs harbour in September 2002

- Coat of arms

- Location within Scania Location within Sweden Location within European Union
- Coordinates: 56°12′N 12°34′E
- Country: Sweden
- Province: Scania
- County: Scania County
- Municipality: Höganäs Municipality

Area
  - Total: 182 km^{2} (70 sq mi)

Population (31 December 2010)
  - Total: 24,608
  - Density: 1,595/km^{2} (4,130/sq mi)
- Time zone: UTC+1 (CET)
  - Summer (DST): UTC+2 (CEST)

Höganäs (Swedish: [ˈhø̂ːɡaˌnɛːs]) is a locality and the seat of Höganäs Municipality, Scania County, Sweden. Its population was 14,107 in 2010.

Höganäs is nationally known for its ceramics industry, Höganäs Keramik. Höganäs Keramik is part of Iittala Group.

Höganäs has the main office of Höganäs AB, one of the world's biggest iron powder manufacturers with subsidiaries around the world. The Höganäs AB company was founded by Count Eric Ruuth in 1797, which makes it one of Sweden's oldest companies.

== History ==
Höganäs began as a small fishing village in the parish of Väsby, documented in 1488 in the written form Høyenæss. In the middle of the 17th century it had 17 homes. Coal was found in the area, and mining started in 1797. In 1798 a railway with wooden rails was built. It was the first of its kind in Sweden and was used to transport coal from the mine to the harbour. The population started to grow and new dwellings were built for the miners. During the 19th century more industries were built using clay for making ceramic products. Höganäs is well known still today for ceramics. The coal mines, however, were closed in the 1960s. In 1936, when Höganäs got the title of a city it had 6,915 inhabitants. Since 1971 it is the seat of Höganäs Municipality, encompassing the Kullaberg peninsula with totally around 24,000 inhabitants.

In 2009, the city began accepting the euro in its shops, restaurants, banks, and other businesses. More than 30 shops accept euros in cash as a part of a PR attempt.

== Gallery ==
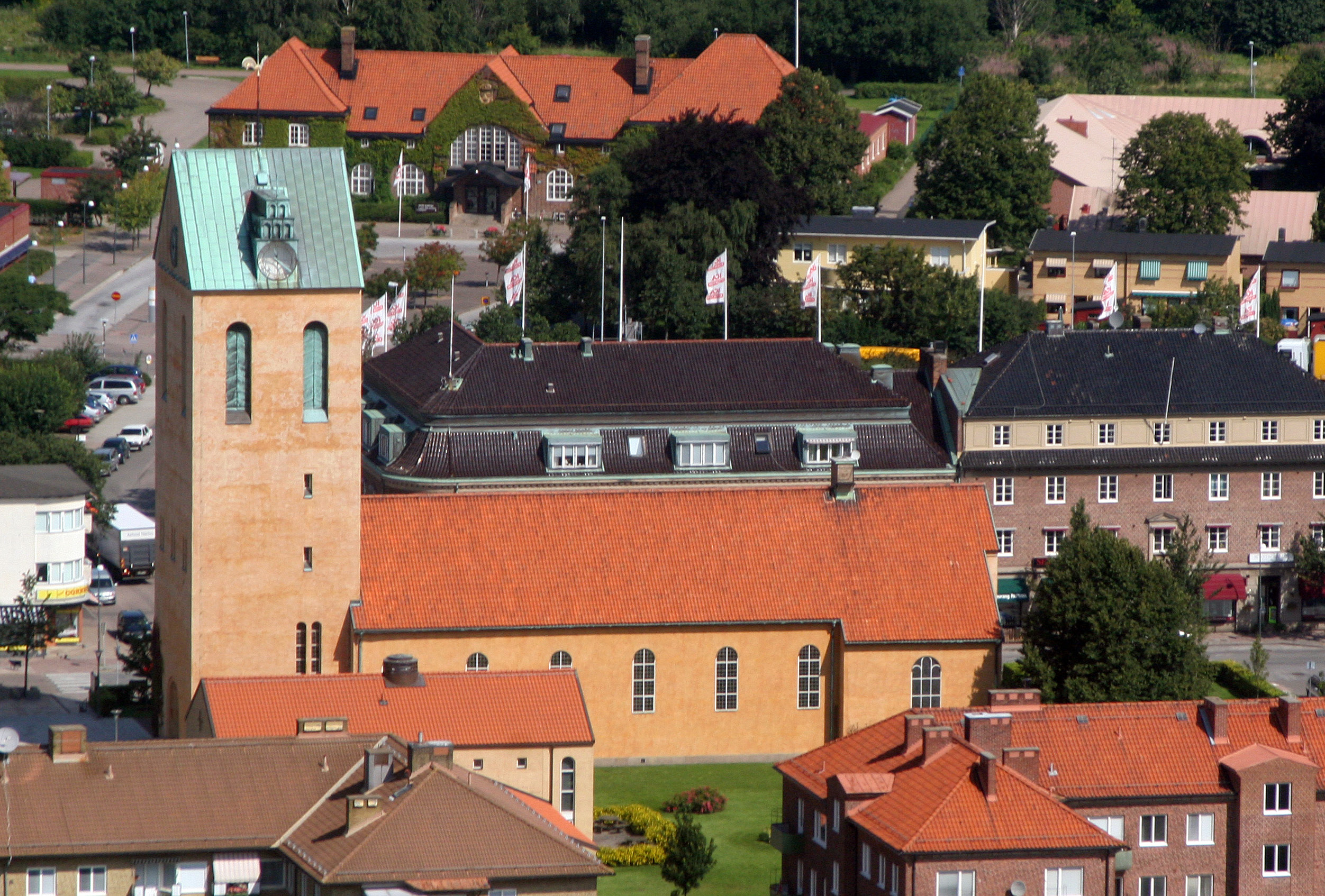
Höganäs church.

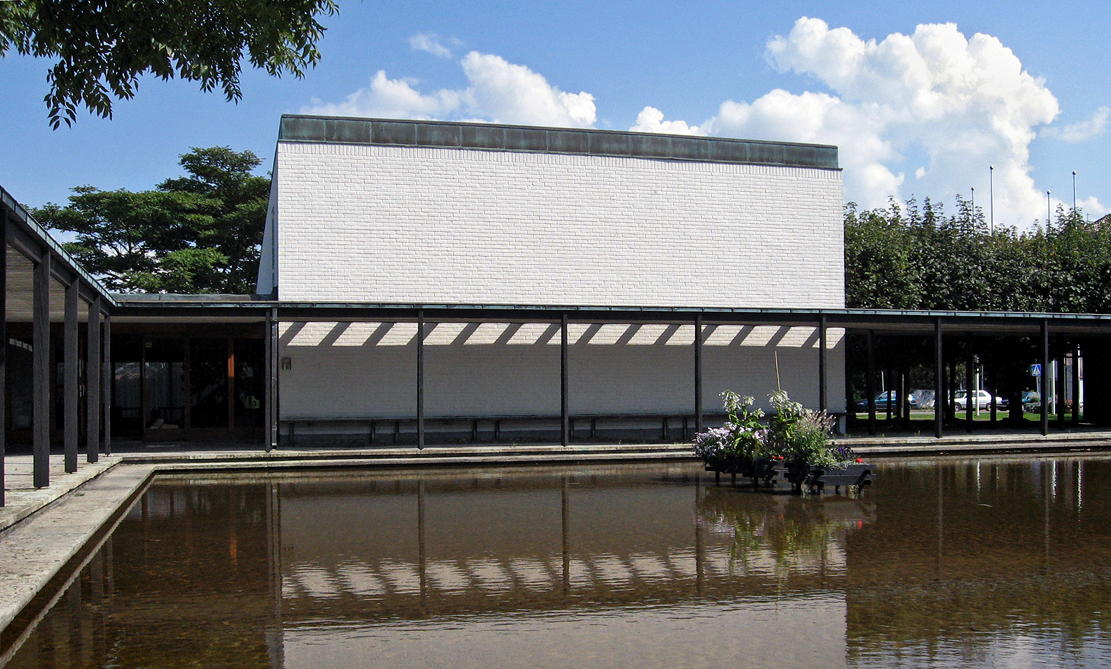
Höganäs Town hall courtyard.

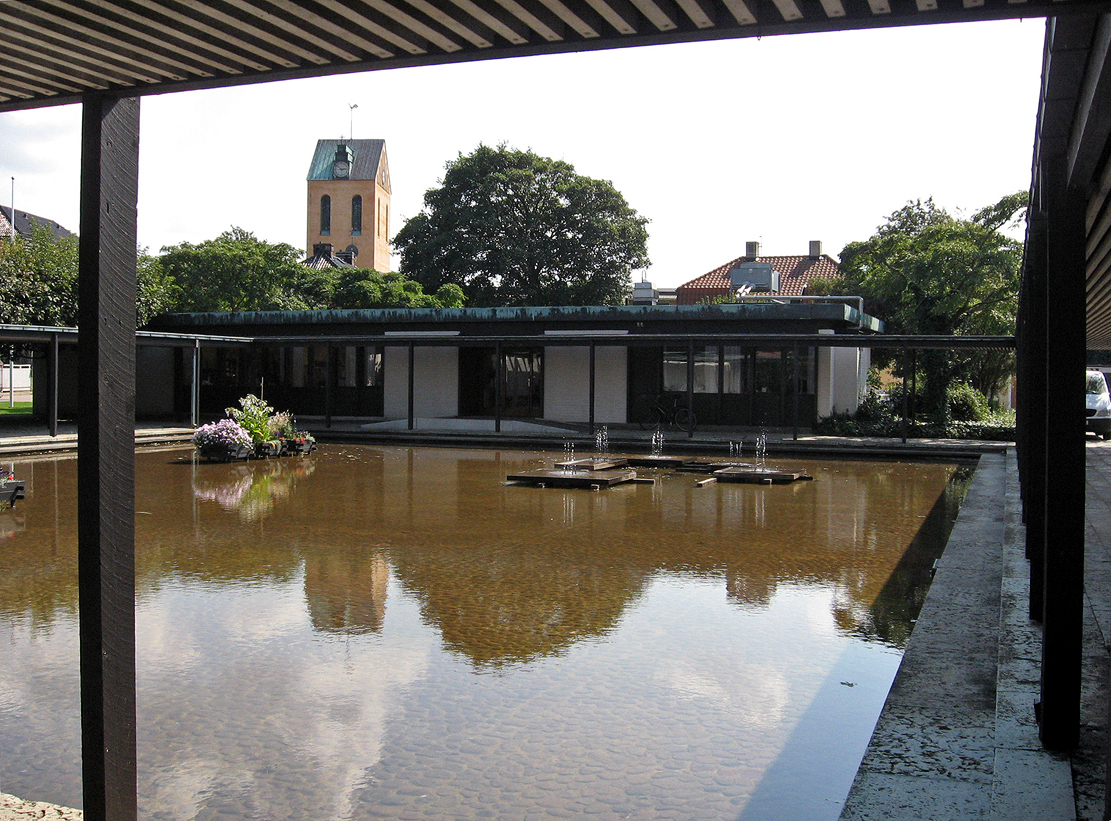
Höganäs Town hall courtyard.

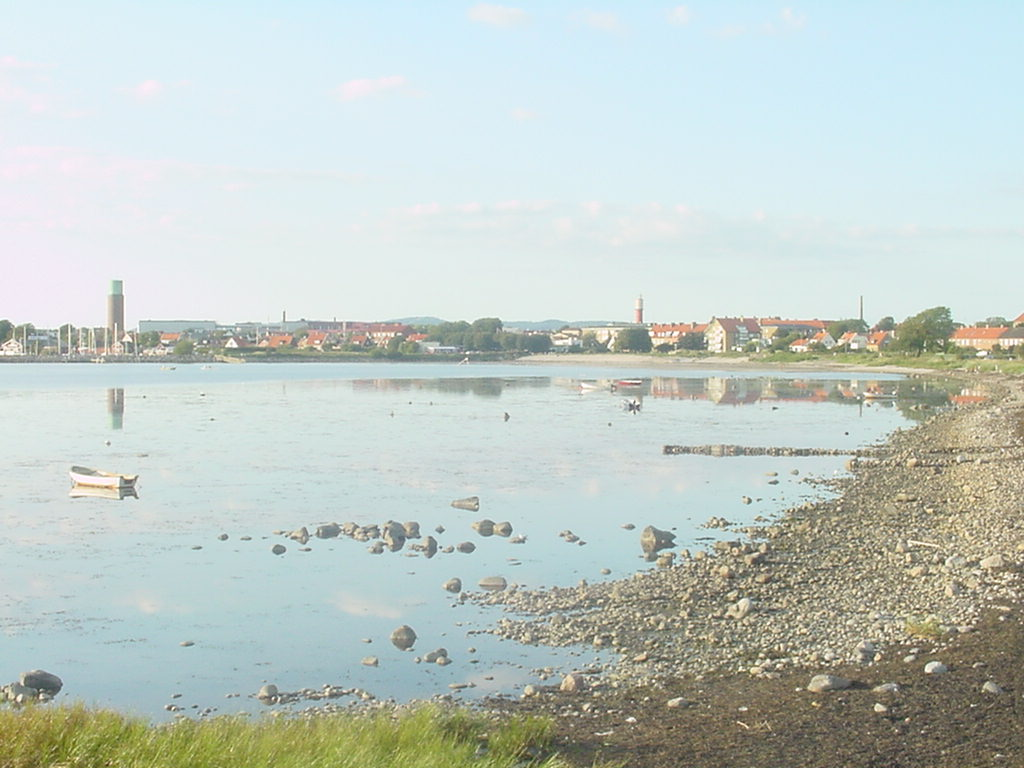
Höganäs harbor.

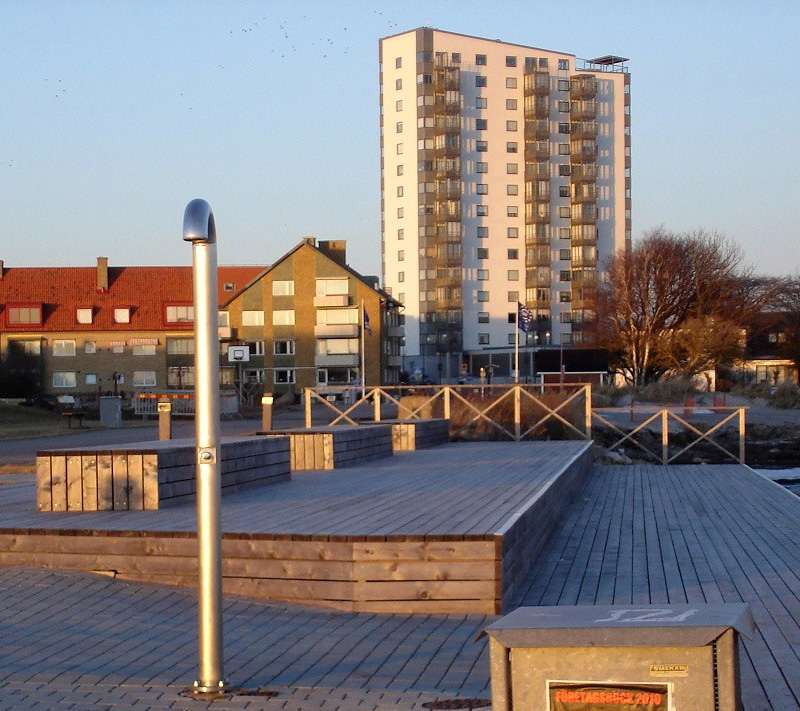
Jefast house.
