= Fatty container =

Record storage box designed by Harri Koskinen

The Fatty Container (or simply the Fatty) is a vinyl record storage box designed by the Finnish designer Harri Koskinen in 1998 for company Schmidinger as part of their Möbel Kollektion range.

== Models ==
There are two models, with catalogue numbers 7100 and 7150 from the Möbel Kollektion. Both are nearly identical in finish. They are made of quality birch plywood finished with a light clear lacquer, with rounded corners formed by bending the plywood. This bending is enabled by the inside having a further two pieces of plywood which allow the bending of the rounded sides, as well as also the flush fitting of the flat sides and lid. Two strong metal hinges are on either side of the back end of the lid, the front end of which has a catch for keeping it closed, with a loop for using a padlock if desired by the user.

=== The 7100 'Hockerkiste' ===
('Hockerkiste' translates from the German as 'Stool Crate')

- Dimensions: (external) W400mm x D400mm x H400mm / (internal) W380mm x D380mm x H380mm.
- Capacity: 53 Litres (approx.).
- Weight: 4.7 kg (approx.).
- Features: No handles, designed for storing records in situ, and can be used as a stool (or stools, if many units placed together).

=== The 7150 'Kiste' ===
('Kiste' translates from the German as 'Crate')

- Dimensions: (external) W200mm x D400mm x H400mm / (internal) W180mm x D380mm x H380mm.
- Capacity: 25 Litres (approx.).
- Weight: 3.4 kg (approx.).
- Features: Handle on the lid, designed for carrying records.

== Quality ==
While technically they are handmade, machinery is used in some of the construction processes for the boxes. The €198 (7100) and €172 (7150) retail price in continental Europe for each unit is extremely expensive when compared to similar, although lesser designed products using simpler materials, which offer the record collector an alternative at between 10–20% of the price. However, in its favour, the Fatty is arguably far superior ergonomically and is intended equally as a piece of furniture to sit on (in the case of the 7100). That, along with being designed by a much in demand designer, Harri Koskinen, may account for this relatively high pricing.

== See also ==
- Block Lamp
