= Kaj Franck =

Finnish artist and designer (1911–1989)

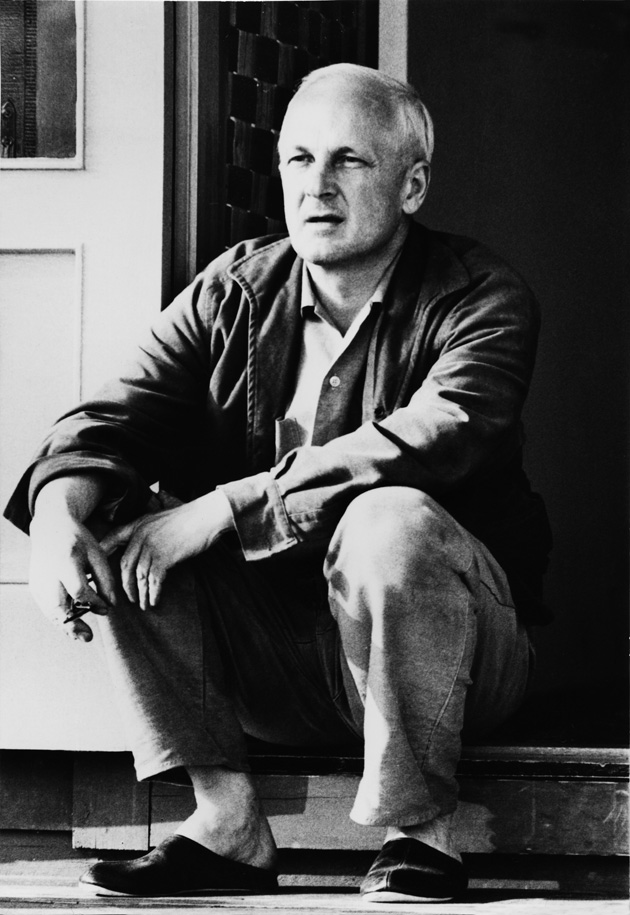
- Born: 9 November 1911; Vyborg
- Died: 26 September 1989 (aged 77); Santorini
- Resting place: Hietaniemi cemetery
- Occupation: Designer, glass artist
- Awards: Prince Eugen Medal (1964); Lunning Prize (1955); Compasso d'Oro (1957)

Kaj Gabriel Franck (9 November 1911 – 26 September 1989) was one of the leading figures of Finnish design and an influential figure in design and applied arts between 1940 and 1980.

== Biography ==
Franck was born in Vyborg, Grand Duchy of Finland to parents Kurt Franck and Genéviève "Vevi" Ahrenberg. He was a Swedish-speaking Finn, and he was of German descent through his father.

Franck was artistic director of the Arabia ceramics company (now part of Iittala Group) and artistic director and teacher at the College of Applied Arts – the predecessor of the University of Art and Design Helsinki (now Aalto University) – since 1945, but created designs for other companies as well. He received the 1957 Compasso d'Oro Gran Premio Internazionale career prize, was awarded the Prince Eugen Medal in 1964.

The Design Forum Finland awards the yearly Kaj Franck Design Prize to a designer or team of designers working in the spirit of the late Kaj Franck. Recipients of the prize include Oiva Toikka (1992), Yrjö Kukkapuro (1995), Heikki Orvola (1998), Eero Aarnio (2008), Simo Heikkilä (2011) and Harri Koskinen (2014).

The Mint of Finland released a collector coin with the theme “Kaj Franck and Industrial Art” in January 2011. The coin commemorates the one hundredth anniversary of his birth.

Franck died in Santorini, Greece in 1989 and is buried in the Hietaniemi Cemetery in Helsinki.
