= Heikki Orvola =

Finnish designer and planner (born 1943)

Heikki Orvola (born November 29, 1943, in Helsinki) is a Finnish designer and planner.

== Career ==
He started his career as a designer in the 1960s. In 1968, he started to work at the Nuutajärvi glassworks. In 1972, he designed the Aurora set of glasses for Iittala. With Fujiwo Ishimoto he designed the Illusia tableware for Arabia Ceramics Factory.

In the 1980s, Orvola designed for Marimekko. In 1987, he designed the candleholder Kivi, which is still in production today at Iittala. In 1998, he designed the Verna goblet, as well as a set of glasses called Palazzo for Iittala. His design work can be found in Finnish museums as well as abroad.

Orvola received an Order of the Lion of Finland medal in 1984 and in 1988, he won the Kaj Franck Design Prize. In 2002, he received the title of professor.
