= Block Lamp =

Light fitting designed by Harri Koskinen

The Block Lamp is a lightfitting designed by Finnish designer Harri Koskinen, and produced by Design House Stockholm. It is a seemingly simple design of a lightbulb held inside two shaped pieces of clear glass, measurements 10.2 x 15.9 x 8.9 cm (4" x 6.3" x 3.5"). After designing the lamp in 1996, Koskinen first went to Iittala, who turned him down. The Block Lamp has been part of MoMA's permanent collection since 2000, and has been showered with design awards including: Excellent Swedish Design in 1998, the Design Plus Award at the Ambiente Trade Fair in Frankfurt in 1999 as well as the Best New Product at the Accent Show in New York in 1999.
