= Schmidiger =

Schmidiger is a surname. Notable people with the surname include:

- Cyrill Schmidiger (born 1978), Swiss footballer
- Edy Schmidiger (1916–?), Swiss boxer
- Reto Schmidiger (born 1992), Swiss alpine skier

== See also ==
- Schmidinger
