= Harri Koskinen =

Finnish designer

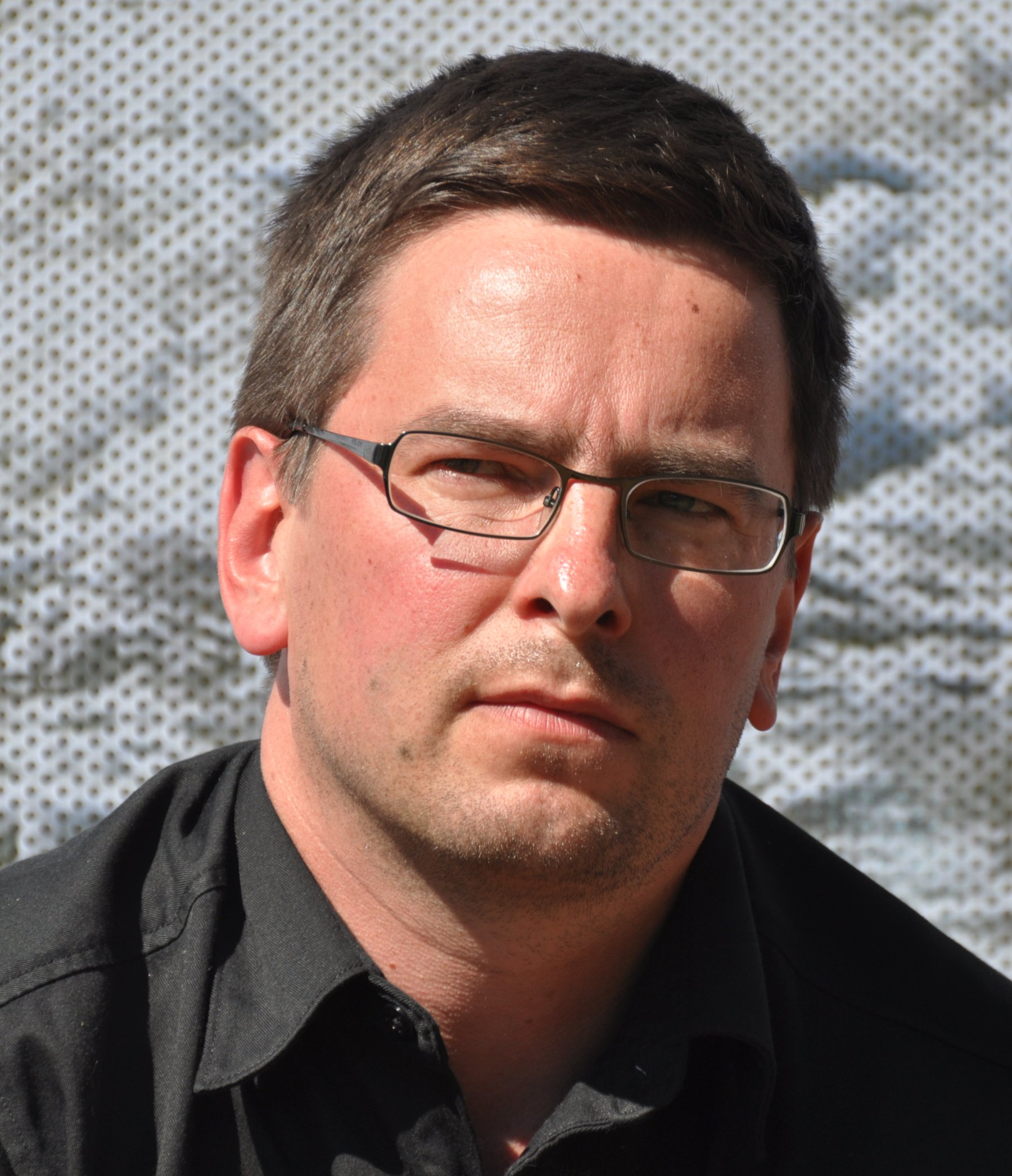
Harri Koskinen in 2012.

Harri Koskinen is a Finnish designer, born 1970 in Karstula, Finland. He has studied at the Institute of Art and Design in Helsinki.

== Career ==
Koskinen is probably best known for his Block Lamp, a lightbulb held inside two shaped pieces of clear glass, which is exhibited in MoMA in New York City. Also very well known for the two variants of his Fatty container (models 7150 and 7100) designed in 1998 for Schmidinger; basically very expensive vinyl record carrying box and storage units respectively, made from Birch plywood with rounded corners as well as a well designed and finished construction.

Koskinen has designed for many different labels and companies, across many types of article; from furniture to cookware, as well as commercial packaging. His designs are manufactured by companies including Iittala, Artek, Fiskars, Design House Stockholm and Muuto.

Harri Koskinen signed a cooperation agreement with Iittala and was appointed Iittala's design director in 2011.

== Products ==
- Block Lamp (1996), Design House Stockholm
- Fatty Container (1998), Schmidinger
- Candle Lantern (1999), Iittala
- Genelec 8000-series speakers (2002), Genelec
- Muu Chaise (2003), Montina
- Iittala Carafe 125 (2006), Iittala
- Korona Light (2014), Valoarte
- Genano 100- and 200-series air purifiers

== Awards ==
- Torsten and Wanja Söderberg Prize in 2009
- Compasso d'Oro in 2004 for the Muu chair
- Pro Finlandia medal in 2007.
- Named Young Designer of the Year by Design Forum Finland in 2000
- Excellent Swedish Design in 1998 (The Block Lamp)
- Design Plus Award at the Ambiente Trade Fair in Frankfurt (The Block Lamp)
- Best New Product at the accent show in New York in 1999 (The Block Lamp)
- The Block lamp became part of MoMA's permanent collection in 2000.

== See also ==
- Fatty container
- Block Lamp
