= Höganäs Keramik =

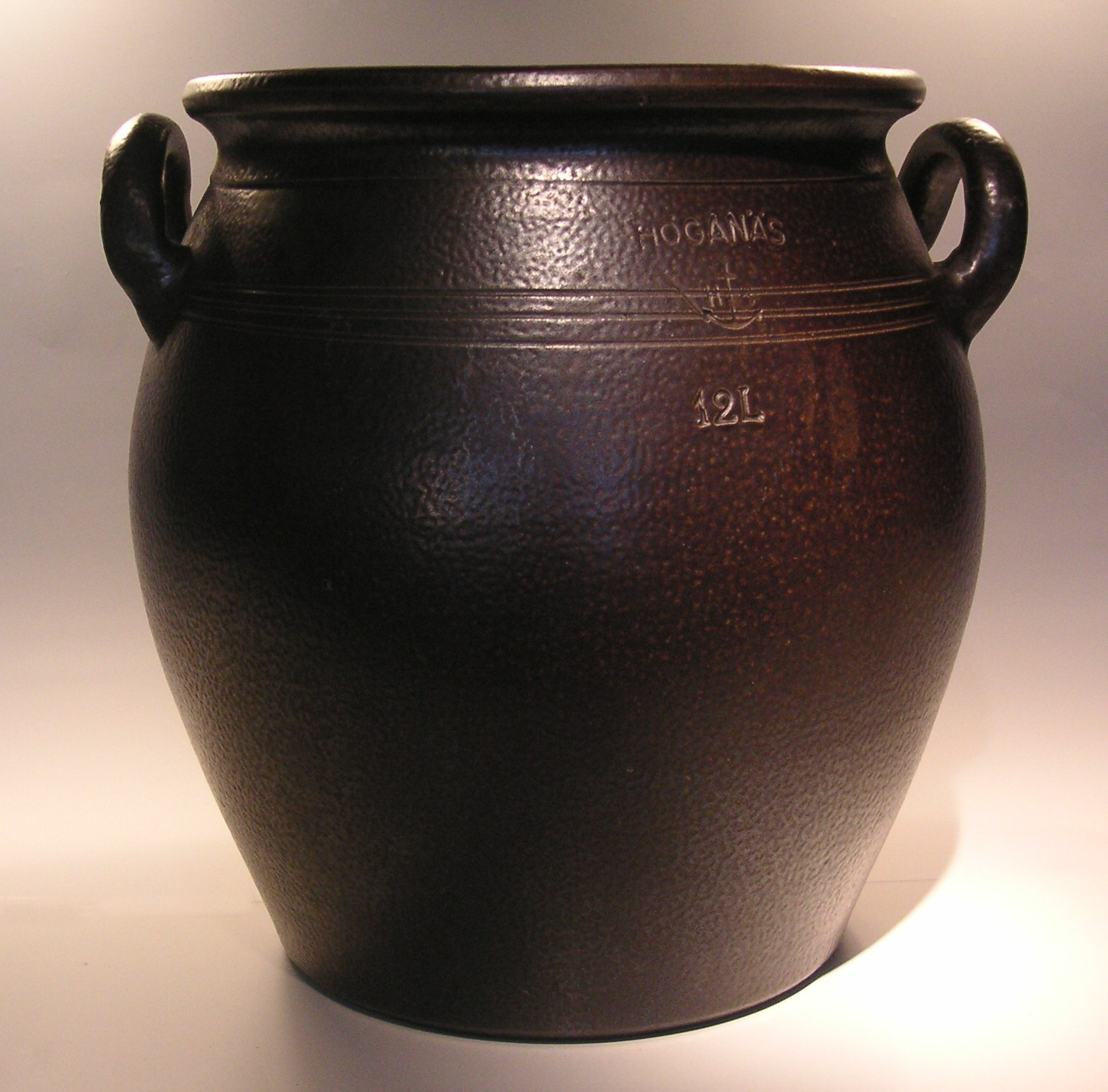
Classical Höganäskrus (Höganäs pot)

Höganäs Keramik began its manufacturing operations in 1909. It is now a design company and a part of Iittala Group, which is also known for BodaNova, Rörstrand and Iittala design brands.

The company's range includes stoneware from Höganäs Keramik, cutlery, glass, serving products from BodaNova and porcelain tableware from Rörstrand.

== History ==
The company was founded in 1909 and was originally called Andersson & Johansson's Pottery Factory. Sigfrid Johansson was glazier and colleague Karl Andersson was master turner. The production of ceramics in earthenware was initially conducted in rather modest forms, but already after five years - 1914 - it was possible to participate in the Baltic exhibition in Malmö. During the 1920s, the factory was expanded to accommodate five turntables. Since Höganäs AB in 1926 switched completely to stoneware production, it was possible to take over their premises for pottery production. During the 1930s came the first own collections. They now began to manufacture various refractory products for trade, including ashtrays with red glaze.

A factory twice the size was taken into use in the 1940s, and in 1948 the business was transformed into a limited company. Molds, pots and pans became increasingly common elements in the range. During the exhibition H55 in Helsingborg, the ceramic series Old Höganäs was launched, inspired by the light lead-glazed goods from Höganäsbolaget. During this time, several well-known artists are also associated with the factory, including John Andersson, Signe Persson-Melin and Hertha Bengtsson.
