= Oiva Toikka =

Finnish glass designer (1931–2019)

Oiva Kalervo Toikka
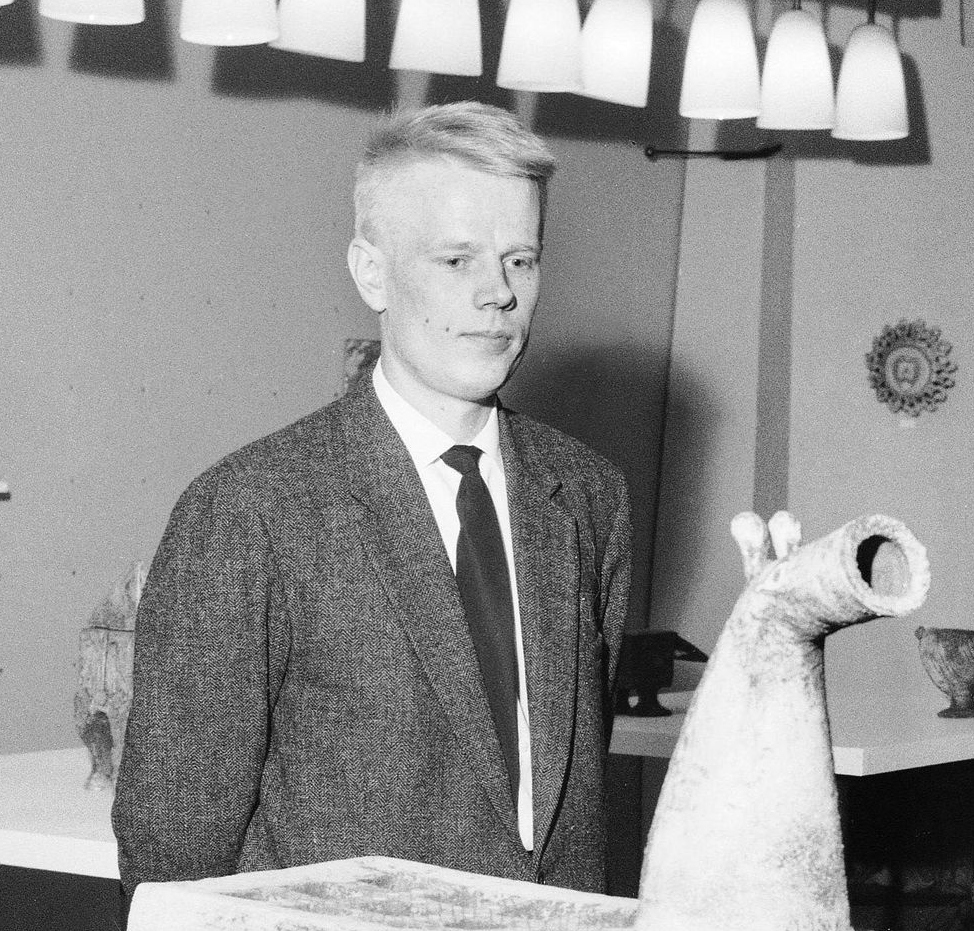
- Toikka in 1958
- Born: 29 May 1931; Viipurin maalaiskunta, Finland
- Died: 22 April 2019 (aged 87); Helsinki, Finland
- Education: University of Art and Design Helsinki
- Employer: Iittala
- Notable work: Birds by Toikka, Kastehelmi
- Spouse: Inkeri Toikka
- Awards: Kaj Franck Design Prize; Prince Eugen Medal; Pro Finlandia

Oiva Kalervo Toikka (29 May 1931 – 22 April 2019) was a Finnish glass designer, best known for his designs for Iittala.

== Biography ==
Oiva Toikka was born in Viipurin maalaiskunta, the rural municipality surrounding then-Finnish Vyborg, now part of Russia. He grew up in a farm and was influenced by the rich history of the area.

Oiva Toikka was renowned for his designs for glassware for the Finnish design company Iittala. Originally trained in ceramics at the University of Art and Design Helsinki, he took up glass design later in life. Some of his best known works are the Kastehelmi and Flora tableware from the 1960s and the Pioni and Krouvi collections from the 1970s.

Along with his glassware designs, Toikka is best known for his designs for the Iittala "Birds by Toikka" series. From 1972 until his death in 2019, Toikka created over 400 mouth-blown glass birds. Although Toikka originally worked at the Nuutajärvi glassworks in Urjala, his designs are currently produced at the Iittala glass factory in Hämeenlinna.

Toikka enjoyed success, too, in other creative outlets. He worked as a stage and costume designer, generally with Finnish director Lisbeth Landefort, whose autobiography he illustrated. In his later years, he was also associated with productions by the Finnish National Theatre and the Finnish National Opera. He has also occasionally contributed textile designs to the Marimekko collections.

Toikka's awards include the Lunning Prize in 1970, Finnish State Award for Crafts and Design in 1975, Pro Finlandia Medal in 1980, Kaj Franck Design Prize in 1992, Finland Prize in 2000 and Prins Eugen Medal in 2001.

== Literature ==
- Hannes, Alfons & Kermer, Wolfgang & Eisch, Erwin: Die Sammlung Wolfgang Kermer, Glasmuseum Frauenau: Glas des 20. Jahrhunderts; 50er bis 70er Jahre, pp. 56–58. Schnell & Steiner, München–Zürich, 1989 (Bayerische Museen, 9.) ISBN 3-7954-0753-2
- Birds by Toikka 2008. Publication of the Iittala Group. Helsinki, 2008.
- Dawson, Jack: Oiva Toikka: Glass and Design. Werner Söderström, 2007.
