= Orbit chair =

Chair designed by Ingmar Relling

Origin
- Designer: Ingmar Relling
- Country: Norway
- Date: 1976

Specifications
- Materials: Wood frame leather cover
- Style: Modernist
- Height: 87 centimetres (34 in)
- Width: 78.5 centimetres (30.9 in)
- Depth: 47 centimetres (19 in)

Orbit chairs are a type of recline chair designed by the Norwegian furniture designer Ingmar Relling in 1976 for A/S Sykkylven kurvvarefabrikk in Sykkylven Municipality, Norway. The Orbit was designed in a functional style, with a distinct, curved wooden framework. Related to the Orbit is the Siesta chair, and to some degree, many of Relling's laminated wooden frame chairs, such as Nordic, Tema, Rest, Optima, Bonus, and "420". The chair was sold and marketed abroad by the Westnofa export organization. During Ingmar Relling's career, he developed furniture for the following companies: Ekornes, Tennfjord Furniture Factory, Vatne Lenestolfabrikk, Hjellegjerde, and Pedro, which all have manufactured comparable designs to the Orbit chair. The Orbit was among the first recline chairs to feature a laminated wooden frame, allowing for slide movement to adjust the recline position. The Orbits upholstery was covered in cowhide. Ingmar Relling received the Jacob's Award in 1978 and the King's Medal in gold in 1999.
