= Simo Heikkilä =

Finnish designer and interior architect (born 1943)

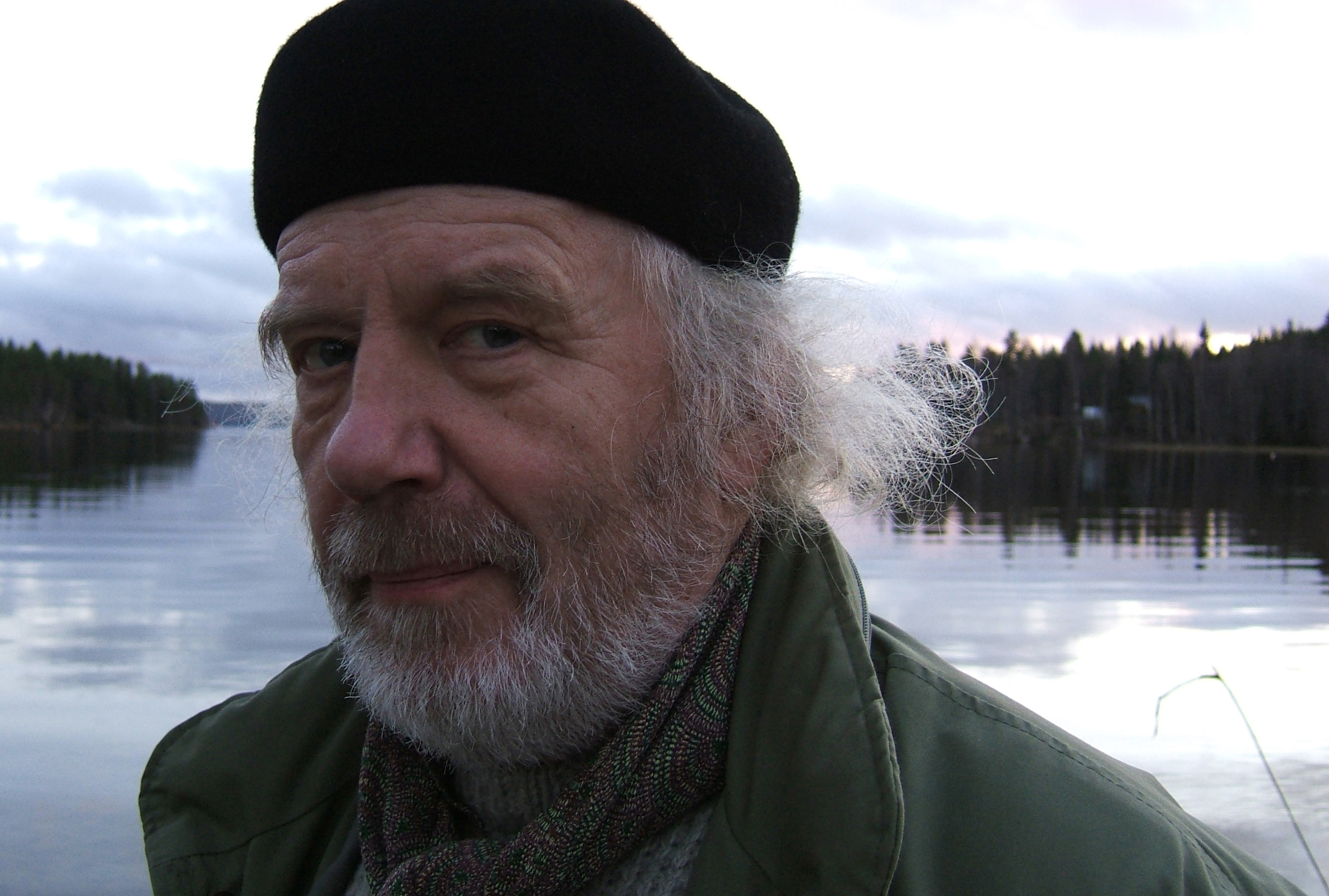
Simo Heikkilä

Simo Heikkilä (born May 2, 1943) is a Finnish designer and interior architect. He is known as a designer, teacher and collaborator with a concern for dying craft skills. Heikkilä established his own studio in 1971. He began his career designing shops and exhibitions for Marimekko and then moved into designing furniture. Heikkilä has acted as the Director of Aalto University's Wood Studio and is an honorary fellow of Aalto University.

Born in Helsinki, Heikkilä has received numerous design awards including the Pro Finlandia medal in 2003 and the Kaj Franck Design Prize in 2011. The prize jury for the Kaj Franck Design Prize noted that "with his humorous touch, Heikkilä has guided young people towards an ecological and practical use of material."

In 2009 Heikkilä invited a group of 21 international designer, including Ronan and Erwan Bouroullec, Konstantin Grcic and Jasper Morrison, to reinterpret the Sami knife or leuku. Each designer was sent an original knife made by a Sami craftsman and given the simple brief to make it better. At the time Simo Heikkilä said of the project, "The leuku is a beautiful and functional object, pure in shape, well balanced and simply composed. Locally developed objects like this are vanishing all over the world." The results of the collaboration were exhibited in Finland and the Saint-Étienne Design Biennial in France, and published as a book.
