= Timo Sarpaneva =

Finnish designer, sculptor and educator

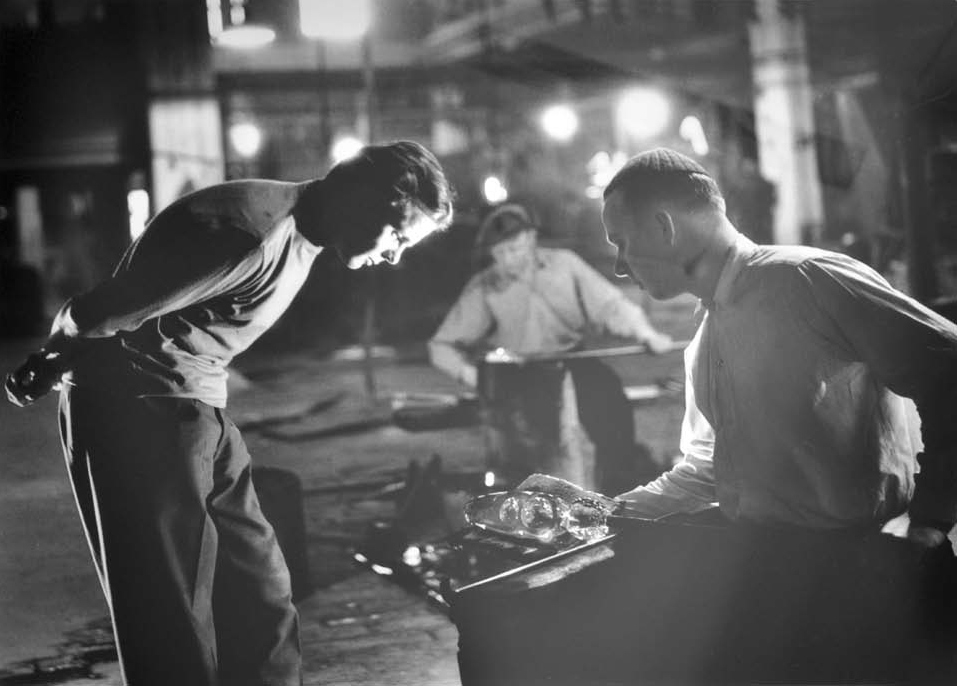
- Sarpaneva (left) in the 1950s
- Born: Timo Tapani Sarpaneva; 31 October 1926; Helsinki, Finland
- Died: 6 October 2006 (aged 79); Helsinki, Finland
- Resting place: Hietaniemi Cemetery, Helsinki
- Education: School of Art and Design, Aalto University
- Occupations: Artist; industrial designer; educator
- Spouses: Ann Mari Pi, nee Holmberg (m. 1954–1970); Marjatta née Svennevig
- Children: 4
- Awards: Silver Medal – Triennale di Milano 1951 Kukko; Lunning Prize 1956; Grand Prix – Triennale di Milano 1957 Exhibition architecture; Grand Prix – Triennale di Milano 1957 Glass collection; Gold Medal – Concorso Internazionale della Ceramica d'Arte Contemporanea, Faenza 1976 Suomi

Timo Tapani Sarpaneva (31 October 1926 – 6 October 2006) was an influential Finnish designer, sculptor, and educator best known in the art world for innovative work in glass, which often merged attributes of display art objects with utilitarian designations. While glass remained his most commonly addressed medium, he worked with metal, wood, textiles, and porcelain (china). Sarpaneva has entered homes around the world through his industrial design of upscale, artistically conceived items, including cast-iron cookware and porcelain dinnerware. His work was among the key components that helped to launch Finland's reputation as a trailblazer of design.

== Biography ==
=== Early ===
As with his grandfather's anvil prominently displayed to introduce visitors to his 2002 retrospective exhibition at the Design Museum in Helsinki, Timo Sarpaneva narrated his family heritage as that of craftsmen. He would mention his maternal grandfather, a blacksmith, whose profession Sarpaneva claimed as his family's tradition "for hundreds of years", and said others were textile artists noting his mother used to make tea cozies. His one-year-older brother Pentti was a graphic designer and made bronze and silver jewelry. With hyperbole, Timo Sarpaneva said he already knew in the womb that he would become a craftsman. His professional response to glass was related to his early memories of molten metal in his grandfather's workshop. A childhood sensation that he would periodically recount later as inspirational for his innovative approach to glass objects spoke of transparency and space:

At the age of eight or nine, I held a piece of ice in my hand until I'd made a hole in it with my warm finger.

Sarpaneva's organic hole in a glass body then appeared at roughly the same time as Henry Moore began to make use of concavities in his human sculptures, and some of his other work with glass is suggestive of that experience.

=== Employment ===
Sarpaneva graduated from the Institute for Industrial Arts (the forerunner of the University of Arts and Design) in Helsinki in 1948 and received a PhD h.c. later. Shortly after he began to work with glass, he won the Iittala competition in engraved glass and was hired by the company in 1951 (other sources mention the previous year) as a designer and director of exhibitions. He won his first Grand Prix at the 1954 Milan Triennale for his clear glass series, which also went to his already well-established colleague at Iittala, Tapio Wirkkala. In 1956, Sarpaneva embraced colored glass as he developed Iittala's new upscale i-linja (i-line) series of plates, bottles, and other objects. Radical for that time, his involvement extended to the design of the packaging and of Iittala's name with a prominent, white, lower-case letter i in a red circle as the new line's trademark, which the company then adopted as its universal logo through the 21st century. i-linja won him his second Grand Prix at the 1957 Milan Triennale, where he also received a Grand Prix for his design of the Finnish exhibition.

In the meantime, he worked on his English at the newly opened Helsinki branch of Berlitz International in the second half of the 1950s, soon began to teach at his alma mater, including a course in linoleum block printing for students of textile design, and became full professor in 1976. Having already worked for the textiles association PMK in the 1950s (and planned an eventually canceled 1957 Triennale garment show for Marimekko in an early recognition that ready-made fashion was beginning to be appreciated as an industrial art), he continued in the 1960s with cloth designs for Tampella and acted as an artistic director for the Swedish textile company Kinnasand between 1964 and 1972, after which he started his association with the German porcelain producer Rosenthal. He commuted between Helsinki and Murano (Venice, Italy) for six years in the 1990s, making mostly sculptures with the Venini glassmakers and the renowned craftsman Pino Signoretto. All along, despite a hiatus in the 1970s when Iittala sought to cancel some of its glass production techniques, Sarpaneva maintained a creative relationship with his first employer for most of his productive life. He was survived by his four adult children and his wife of nine years, Marjatta née Svennevig, whom he married at Helsinki Cathedral in 1997 after 30 years of living together and who designed his tombstone at the Hietaniemi Cemetery, now closed to further burials, the last resting place of numerous people influential in Finnish history, politics, and culture.

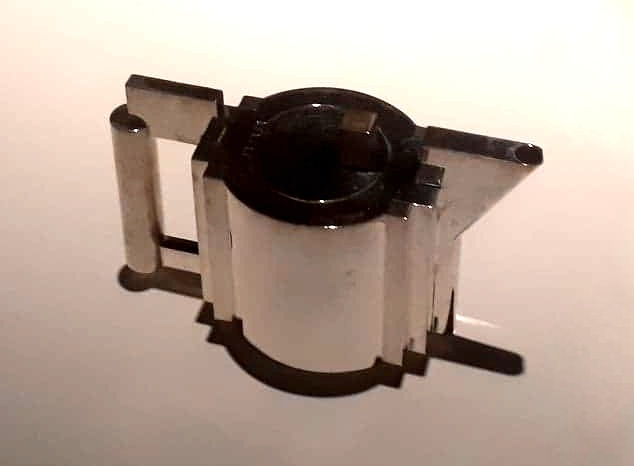
Mäntyniemi silverware (1992) was designed for the new, eponymous presidential residence.

=== Pro Finlandia ===
A degree of patriotism translated both to his close acquaintance with Finland's long-serving President Urho Kekkonen, from whom Sarpaneva received the Pro Finlandia Medal of the Order of the Lion of Finland in 1958 for his success at the Milan Triennale, and to the names of some of his internationally marketed production, Finlandia for a "bark glass" vase series and Suomi ("Finland") for a tableware design. He designed glass vases and silver dinnerware for the presidential residence Mäntyniemi opened in 1993. The image of Finland as a trailblazer of design has long been based on its post-World War II success and on the reputation of Sarpaneva and a handful of its other "designer heroes".

== Work ==
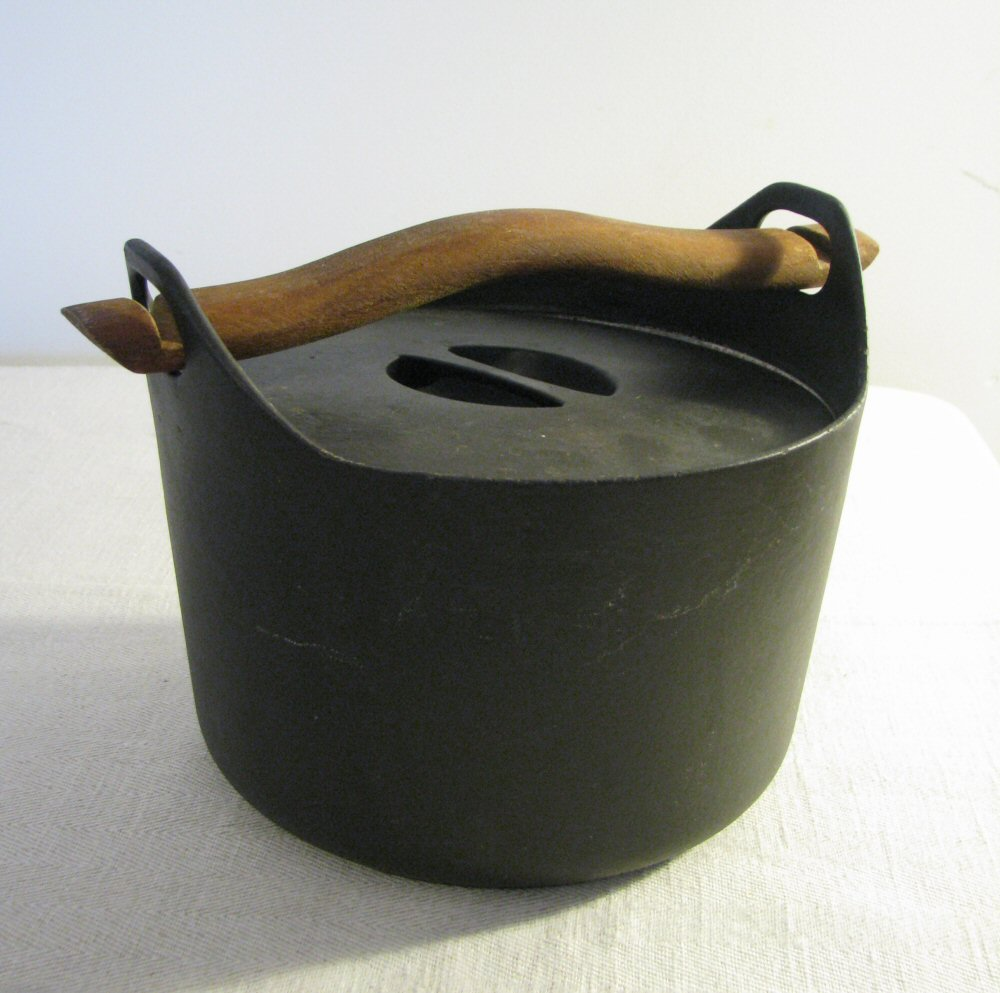
Cast-iron pot (1959), historically modern for "a damned good stew".

The cast-iron pot (cauldron, casserole) Sarpaneva designed in 1959 (production from 1960), which made it onto a Finnish postal stamp in 1998, became emblematic of his creative approach – modern in a way that did not lean too heavily on novelty, it rethought a traditional piece, put history and humanity back into industrial design, and made "a damn good reindeer stew in the process". Having reintroduced it to market in 2003, the manufacturer, Iittala, considers its timeless and ingenious design to be as functional in the kitchen as it is appealing on the dining table. Work like Sarpaneva's proved that the intrinsic quality of materials reduced to their most basic, sensuous essence, shaped by the creative imagination of an artist, beat all the kitsch in the world.

Sarpaneva thought the turning point in his career came for him at the age of 22 when he received the second prize in the Riihimäki Glass Design Contest – second only to his college professor, Arttu Brummer, who won the top award. Sarpaneva worked intermittently with metal, wood, textiles, ceramics, and porcelain (china), while glass remained his main medium from his earliest awards for much of his life, both in industrial design and in display art objects. Trained as a graphic designer, he spent the majority of his life in industrial design while seeing himself more as an artist than a designer. But he discounted the option with a joke when confronted with rumors that Andy Warhol had suggested Sarpaneva's fabrics were masterstrokes ready to be framed as paintings. Nevertheless, Sarpaneva's international career opened up with a comparable feat in textile design when he received a silver medal at the 1951 Milan Triennale for his submission Kukko, an embroidered tea cozy styled as a rooster (hence its Finnish name) with the bird's serrated red comb as its handle, mistaken by some at the exhibition for a carnival hat.

== Textiles ==
In the 1950s–1960s, Sarpaneva created fabric designs for a number of companies associated in PMK (Puuvillatehtaitten myyntikonttori, "Cotton Mills' Sales Office").

=== Ambiente ===
His radical, painterly Ambiente series designed for a linen division of Tampella in the mid-1960s brought robotization to cloth pattern production. Close to 2,000 automated machine settings, which Sarpaneva called "industrial monotypes", enabled extensive variation in color schemes, from intense crimson and turquoise to subtle pea green, cream, and black. Blurring, merging, and distortion resulted in fluid psychedelic patterns and added another layer to the number of options the modified two-sided rotary printing opened for its manufacturers and marketers.

The production was based on an invention Sarpaneva made when visiting a manufacturer of packaging paper, where the printing press was malfunctioning so that the colors mixed and bled on the paper. Sarpaneva thought that achieving the same effect intentionally on cloth would create a varying, fluid pattern where exactly the same pattern would never be repeated. Ambiente attracted international attention, provoking Andy Warhol to jokingly suggest to Sarpaneva that he should sell the line as unique pieces of art, adding that "you would be a millionaire".

== Porcelain ==
=== Suomi ===
Sarpaneva's work in industrial design received its highest recognition with his porcelain (china) full-line dinner service Suomi ("Finland"), on which he worked for four years (some sources say three or two). Commissioned by the German company Rosenthal, which first considered the concept too simple, it was launched in its "studio-line" in 1976. The originally all-white modern classic with gently rounded corners was made part of the permanent collection of the Centre Georges Pompidou in Paris as an example of contemporary design and has remained in production through the 2010s. Sarpaneva said his inspiration came from the forms of rocks rounded and polished by moving water. It combined the circle with the square, a merger of the organic forms of the craft tradition and the straight lines associated with modern industry. The pieces of the chip-resistant service appealed to the hand as well as the eye. Big, comfortable handles made the cups sturdy and easy to hold, rims on the plates prevented spills, tea and coffee pots poured without dripping.

Still in the 1970s, Rosenthal made Suomi the canvass for high-art surface designs limited to 500-set runs by artists renowned at the time, including Salvador Dalí and Victor Vasarely. The company also adjusted Suomi for customers looking to inject self-expression. It manufactured Suomi in a parallel Porcelaine noire series and allowed customers to mix and purchase the luminous white and uncommon black-porcelain pieces in any desired contrastive combination. In a separate modification, the producer catered to those seeking more opulence with gold- and platinum-trimmed Suomi series. Such marketing was not always appreciated on aesthetic grounds with the argument that the decorated versions of various sorts related poorly to Sarpaneva's refined shapes, and that Suomi was extraordinary only in plain white.

=== Limited series ===
On the occasion of launching his Sun in the Forest cup-and-saucer set in London, Sarpaneva said his forms were sometimes inspired by sound.

When I go very deep into the forest, all of my senses are alerted. That is when I can hear with my eyes.

Direct references to sound translated to images also accompanied the promo material with his mug-and-saucer combo Song of the Troll.

== Glass ==
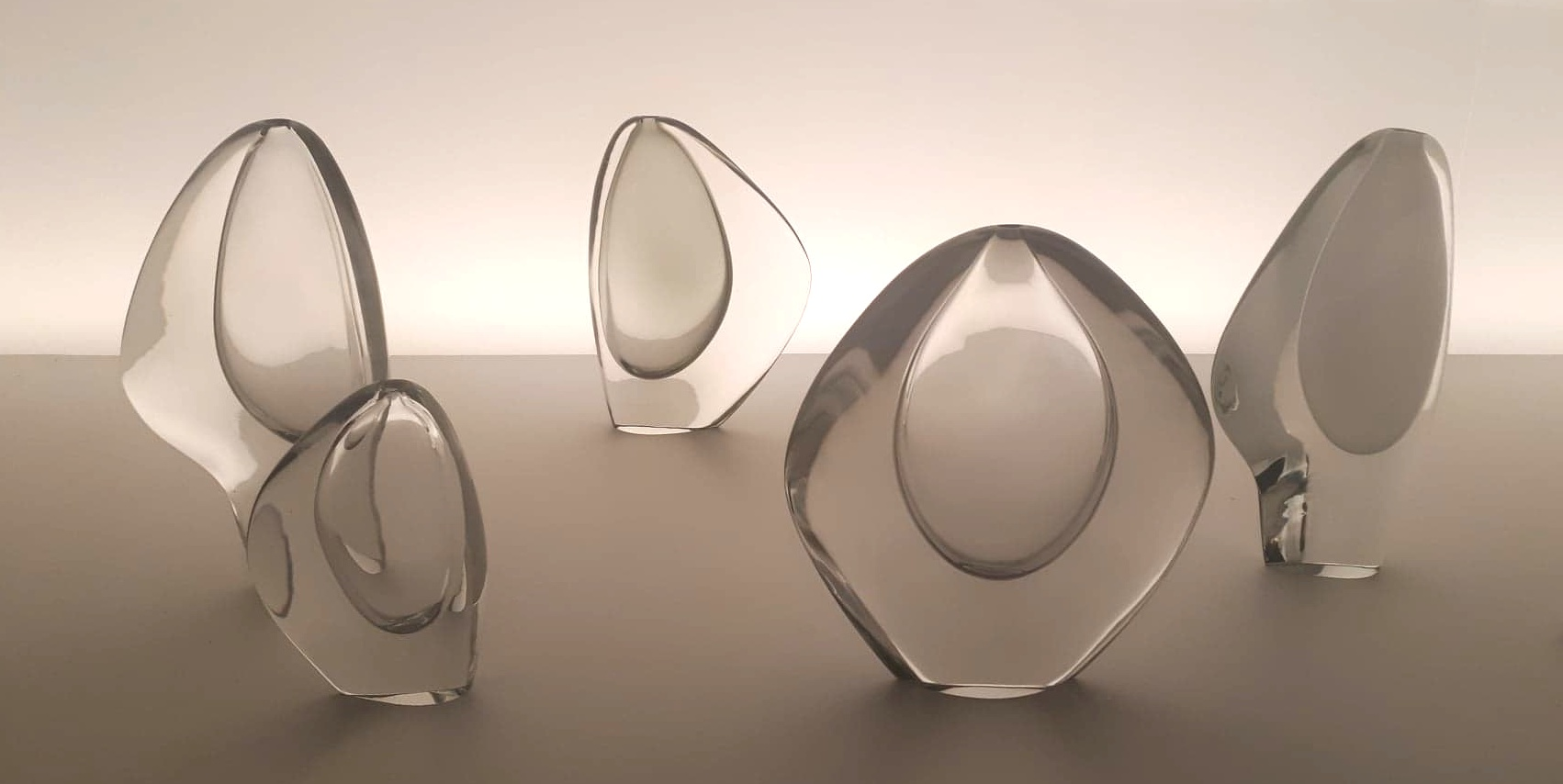
Lansetti, among the Grand Prix winners of Milan triennale 1954.

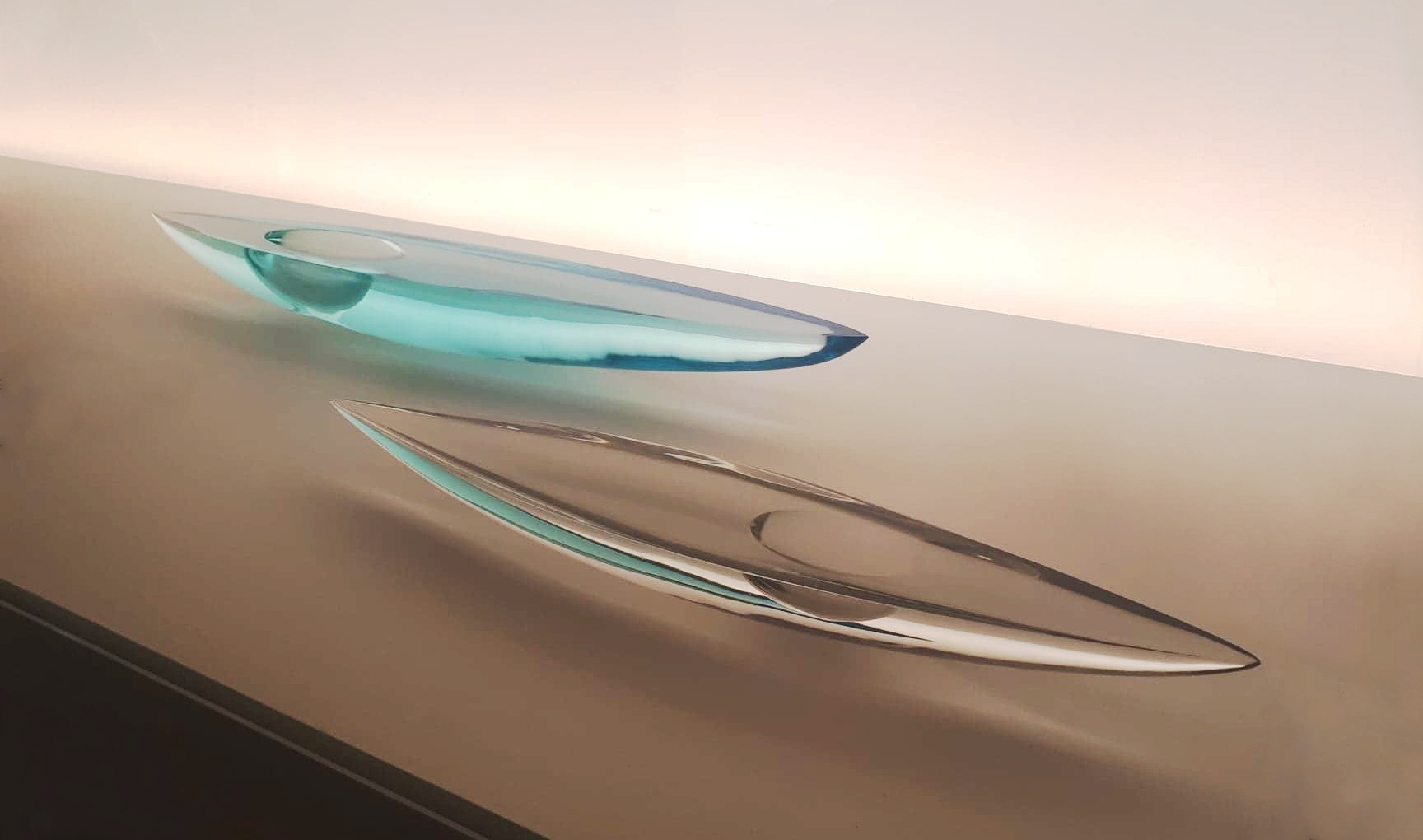
Kajakki, among the Grand Prix winners of Milan triennale 1954.

Sarpaneva was a prolific designer of glass art, both sculpture and functional objects. He pioneered many new methods in glass making, together with the glassblowers of Iittala glassworks. Among the new methods developed was the wet-stick method where spherical spaces within glass are created not by blowing, but by protruding a wet stick into the glass mass. The contact with the hot mass causes the water to evaporate whereupon the vapor blows a cavity into the glass. The glassmakers of Iittala developed a habit of picking up, on their way to work, fallen branches of apple trees, a type of wood particularly well-suited for the purpose. This method is central to many of Sarpaneva's glass art series, such as Kajakki and Orchid.

=== Lancet, Kajakki and Orchid ===
Sarpaneva's first international recognition in glass work came with a Grand Prix from the Milan Triennale in 1954 that included Sarpaneva's series Orkidea ("Orchid"), Kajakki ("Kayak"), and Lansetti ("Lancet") adopted for production by Iittala. He said of his favorite material:

Glass is very mysterious. It's changing all the time. That's what makes it magical. It released me from the conventional and the three-dimensional. It opened its deepest reaches to me and took me on a journey to a fourth dimension. I understood the opportunities that clear, transparent glass gives to an artist and designer.

The amoeboid abstraction "Lancet II" of the latter series, an asymmetrical clear-glass vase whose shape is only partly echoed by its hollow center, was selected by the U.S. magazine House Beautiful as "The Most Beautiful Design Object of the Year" 1954. At his hands distinctions between pure and applied art gradually became less and less meaningful – the glass vases he created in the 1950s exhibited clear sculptural qualities long before he decided to sever his connection with the vessel as a form in 1964 and to make pure sculpture in glass. The Lancet went on to inspire future generations of artists, including architect Ian Simpson whose London skyscraper One Blackfriars was inspired by its shape.

=== Jääpuikko ===
The Jääpuikko decanters are a series of glass vessels designed by the Finnish artist and industrial designer Timo Sarpaneva in 1958. Produced by the Finnish glass manufacturer Iittala, these pieces show Sarpaneva's approach to glassmaking, blending utility with sculptural aesthetics inspired by natural forms. The name "Jääpuikko," which translates to "icicle" in English, reflects the decanters' elongated, tapering shape that evokes the crystalline structure and organic irregularity of hanging ice formations.

=== Finlandia ===
The Finlandia line of "bark glass" vases produced by Iittala in 1964-1970 brought about another innovation, mass-produced household objects each of which was, in a way, exclusive. The collection was distinguished by the presence of thick glass with a rough surface that brought to mind snow and ice, replacing in one blow the smooth, thin, streamlined colored glass of the 1950s. Sarpaneva recalled:

I found a heap of discarded wooden molds used for making polished glass and decided to make a different kind of glass with them. Each piece was slightly different in its shape and surface.

Glass was poured or blown into the molds and allowed to remain long enough for the molds to burn, thereby roughening the surfaces. Each time the mold was blown into, the grain texture changed causing each object in the Finlandia series to be unique although mold-blown. The molds were gradually, and intentionally, destroyed through repeated contact with glass heated to 500 °C (932 F). The changing surface gave each piece a natural randomized "bark" effect created by the carbonized wood, which could not otherwise be convincingly created by an artist.

=== Sculpture ===
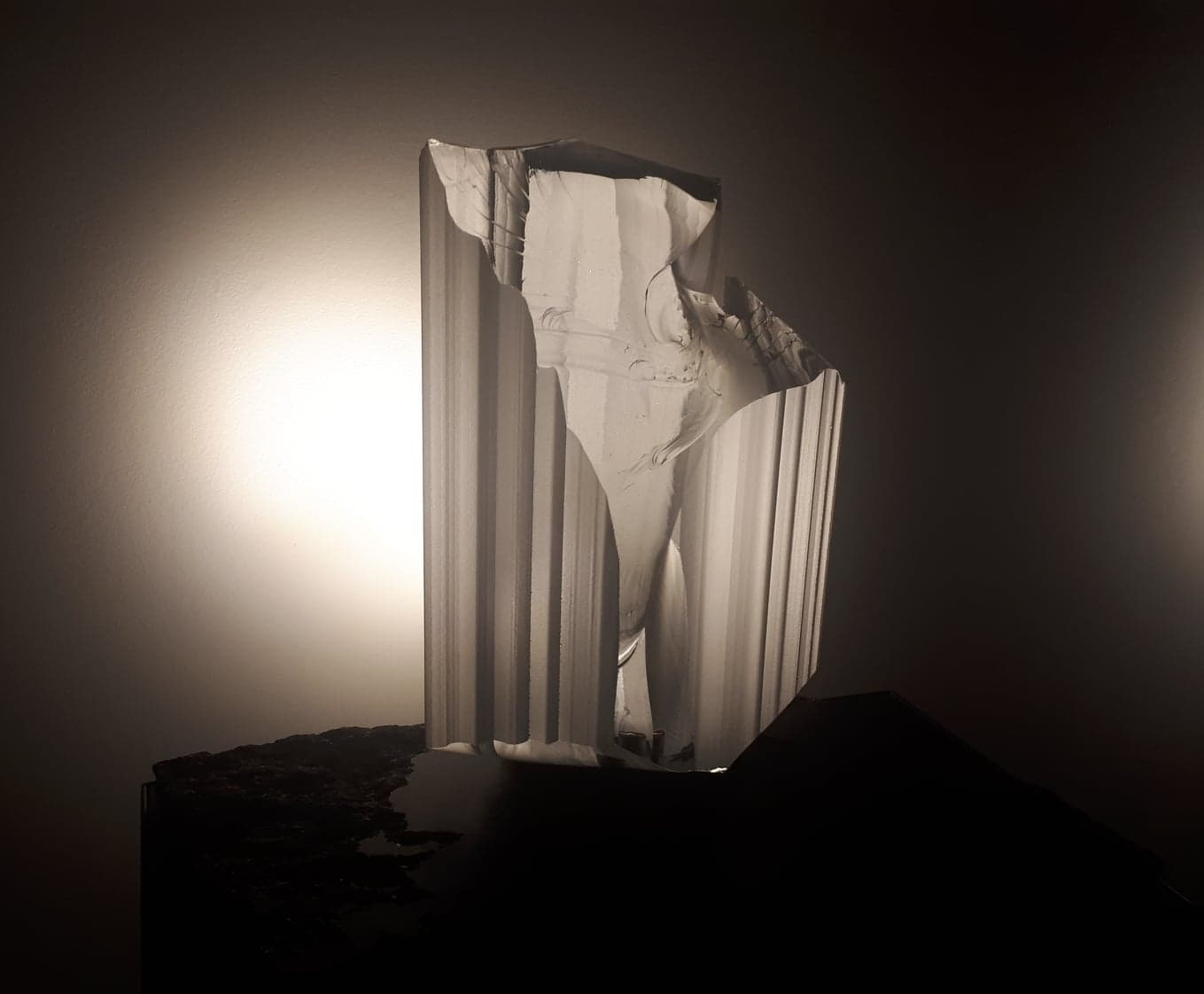
The Year Zero glass sculpture.

==== Pack Ice / Mirror of the Sea ====
Sarpaneva made his and Finland's largest glass sculpture, Ahtojää ("Pack Ice," renamed from Jäävuori, "Iceberg"), for the Finnish pavilion at Expo 67 in Montreal in 1967. It was then bought by the City of Tampere and remained in storage until 1988 when it was installed in the entrance lobby of the KoskiKeskus shopping mall opened in downtown Tampere in March of that year. The 12 m (36 ft.) long and 6.4 m (21 ft.) wide triangle is suspended from the ceiling and filled with 488, up to 1 m (3.3 ft.) high, faceted and noduled glass turrets. Sarpaneva expanded his original concept by attaching Meren peili ("Mirror of the Sea") below Ahtojää, mirror panes interpreting the surface of the sea (the Baltic Sea is partly covered with ice around Finland in the winter, but ice-free in the summer), in order to reminisce on fluidity and the cycle of life, which also subsumed a Finnish take on the two manifestations of the country's denotative multitude of lakes – white ice in the winter and a blue mirror in the summer. Nordic art specialists often compared Sarpaneva's ability to capture light along with its hues to looking through ice beneath the sea.

==== Smile ====
Glass was also the material of his rare work that addressed trans-Atlantic cultural influences. The small, black blown-glass piece Smile with a glossy finish features two large Disneyesque ears rising above a mouth and refers to Mickey Mouse. The ears signify Mickey's state of being, while the sculpture transforms Mickey into a set of abstract geometric relationships.

== Recognition ==
=== Awards ===
- 1951 Silver Medal, for Kukko ("Rooster"), IX Triennale, Milan
- 1954 Grand Prix, glass, X Triennale, Milan
- 1957 Grand Prix, for exhibition architecture, XI Triennale, Milan
- 1957 Grand Prix, glass, XI Triennale, Milan
- 1956 Lunning Prize
- 1976 Gold Medal, for Suomi, Concorso Internazionale della Ceramica d'Arte Contemporanea, Faenza

=== Honorifics ===
- 1958 Pro Finlandia Medal of the Order of the Lion of Finland
- 1963 Honorary Royal Designer for Industry, Royal Society of Arts, London
- 1967 Honorary Doctor, Royal College of Art, London
- 1985 Academico de Honor Extranjero ("Professor Honoris Causa"), Academia de Diseño, Instituto de Cultura de la Ciudad de México
- 1993 Honorary Doctor, School of Art and Design, Aalto University, Helsinki

== Market ==
Sarpaneva's artistically conceived design lines gained in resale value to the degree that forgeries became profitable. The Finnish police estimated the total value of the forgeries of his and some of his peers' designs reached millions of euros and expected it to grow. Occasional, partly tongue-in-cheek, criticism of some of the designs – that the versatile teak handle with the cast-iron pot would get lost, that white Suomi showed tea stains unlike classic British brown tea pots – did not undermine their appreciation. Historically, Christie's executives commented on growth in resale value especially with Sarpaneva's glass creations for the Italian Venini company. Older objects from the same series would be more valuable, for instance, an item from the first year of the Kajakki (Kayak) series, which ran from 1953 to 1959, might fetch 50% more than the same object from the last year of production. Bargain hunters occasionally reported high returns, including the purchase of a Sarpaneva glass plate for 25 cents in a garage sale, which turned out to have a resale value of US$1,000.
