= Schmidinger =

Schmidinger is a surname. Notable people with the surname include:

- Gregor Schmidinger (born 1985), Austrian screenwriter and director
- Krista Schmidinger (born 1970), American alpine skier
- Walter Schmidinger (1933–2013), Austrian actor

== See also ==
- Schmidiger
