= Iittala =

Finnish glass and homewares company

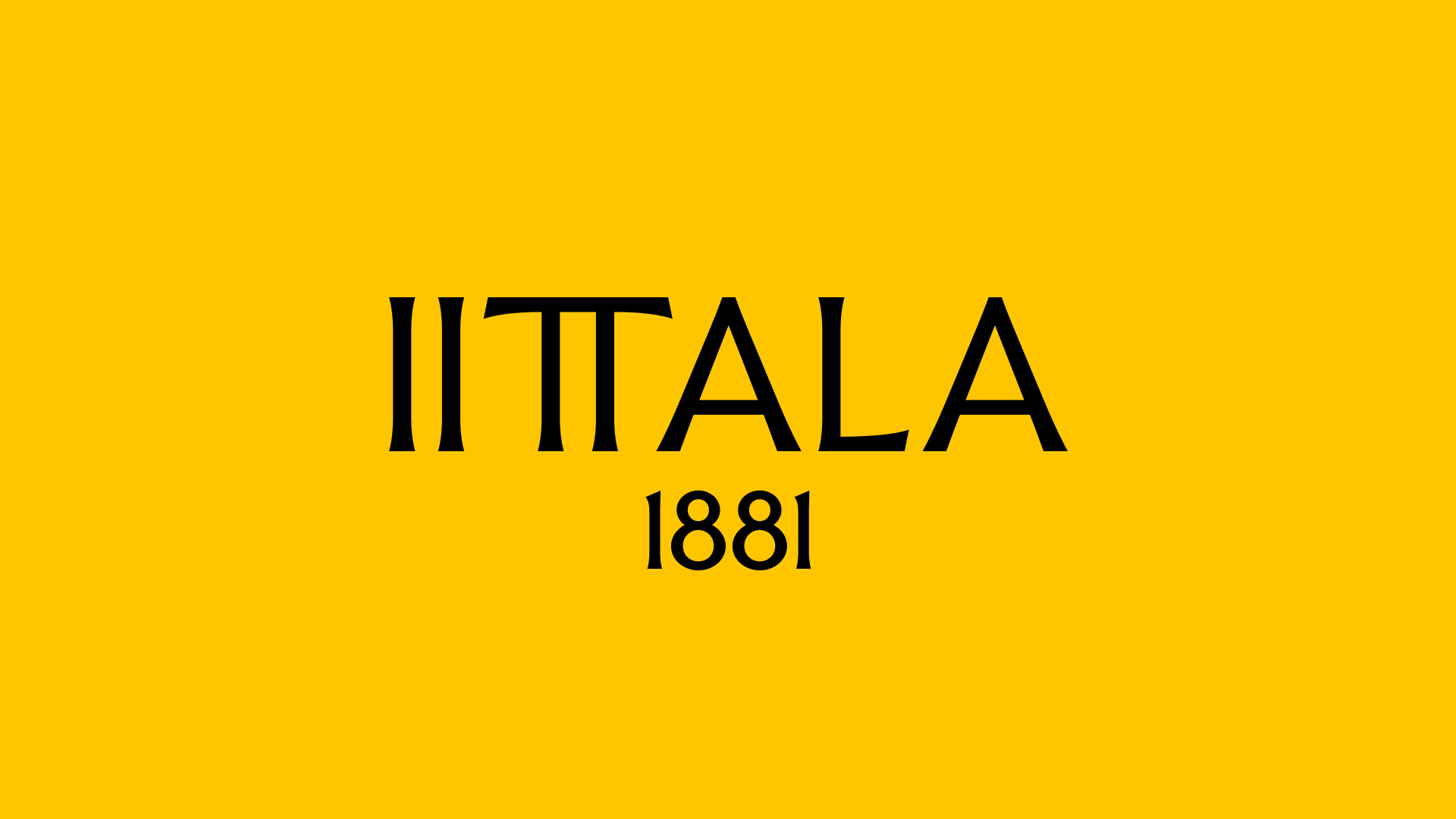
- Industry: Glass
- Founded: 1881; 145 years ago in Iittala, Finland
- Founder: Peter Magnus Abrahamson
- Headquarters: Finland
- Parent: Fiskars
- Website: iittala.com

Iittala, founded as a glassworks in 1881, is a Finnish design brand specialising in design objects, tableware and cookware.

Iittala has strong design roots in glasswares and art glass which can be seen in the early designs of Aino Aalto glasses designed by Aino Aalto in 1932; Alvar Aalto’s Savoy Vase (Aalto Vase) from 1936; Oiva Toikka’s Birds by Toikka glass birds collection that has been made since 1962, his glassware set Kastehelmi from 1964 and Tapio Wirkkala’s glasses Tapio from 1952. and Ultima Thule from 1968.

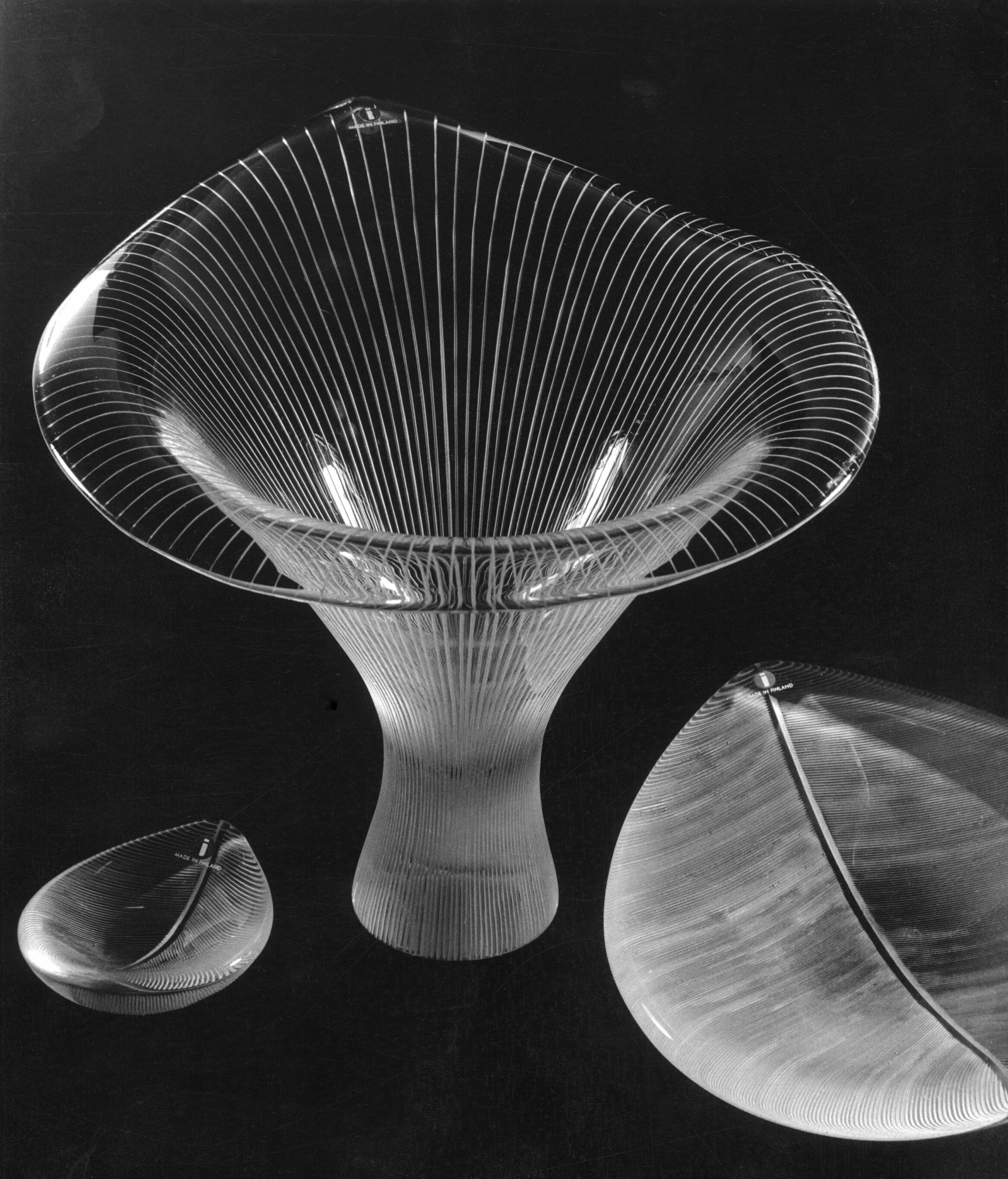
Kanttarelli vase by Tapio Wirkkala (1946)

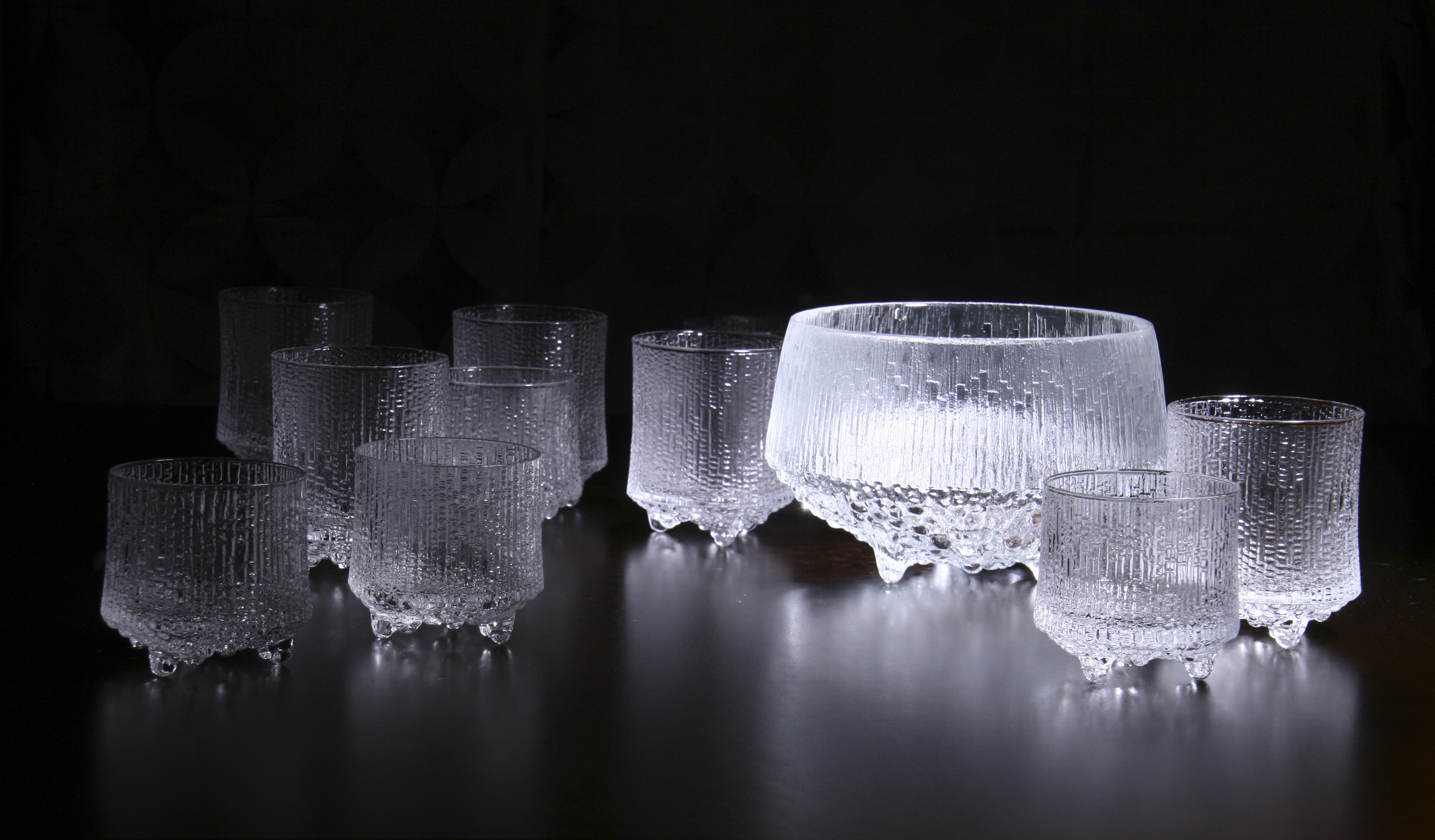
Ultima Thule collection by Tapio Wirkkala (1968)

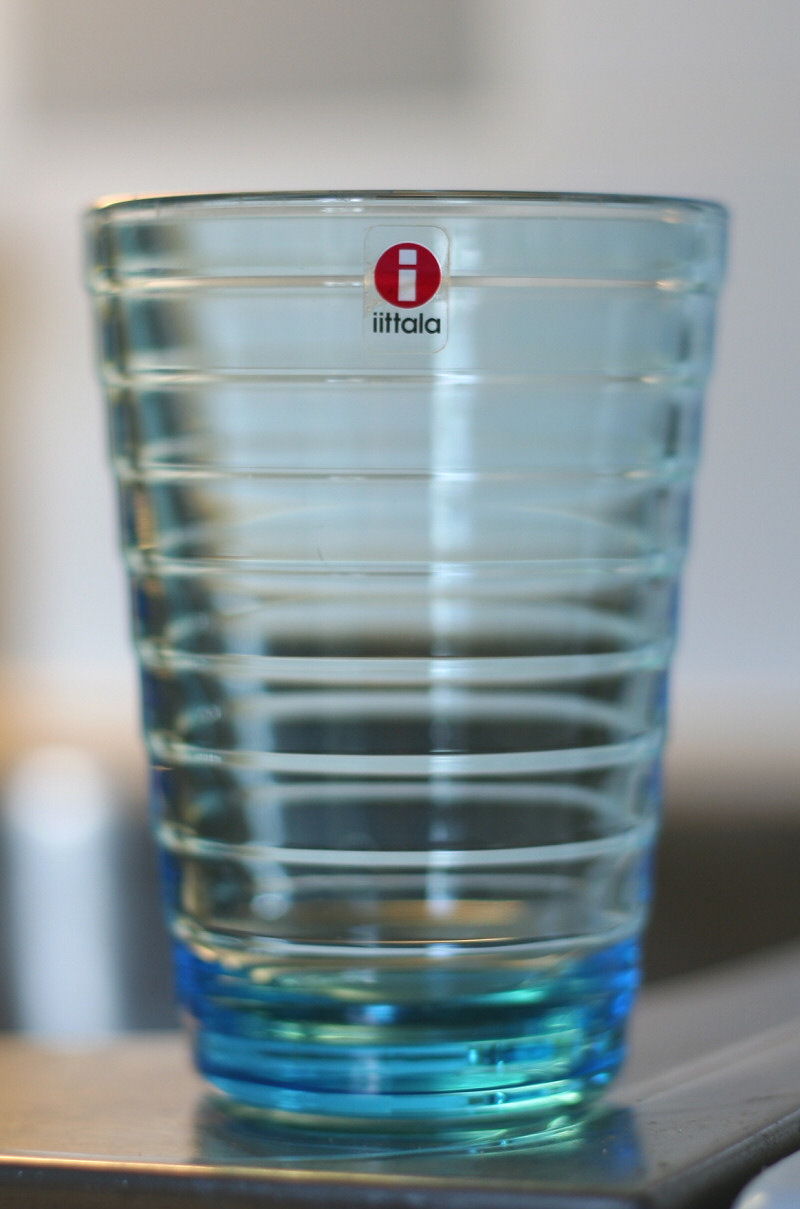
Glass by Aino Aalto

Iittala has expanded from glass to other materials, such as ceramics and metal while keeping with their key philosophy of progressive elegant and timeless design, such as Kaj Franck’s Teema ceramic tableware from 1952 and Timo Sarpaneva's cast iron pot Sarpaneva from 1960.

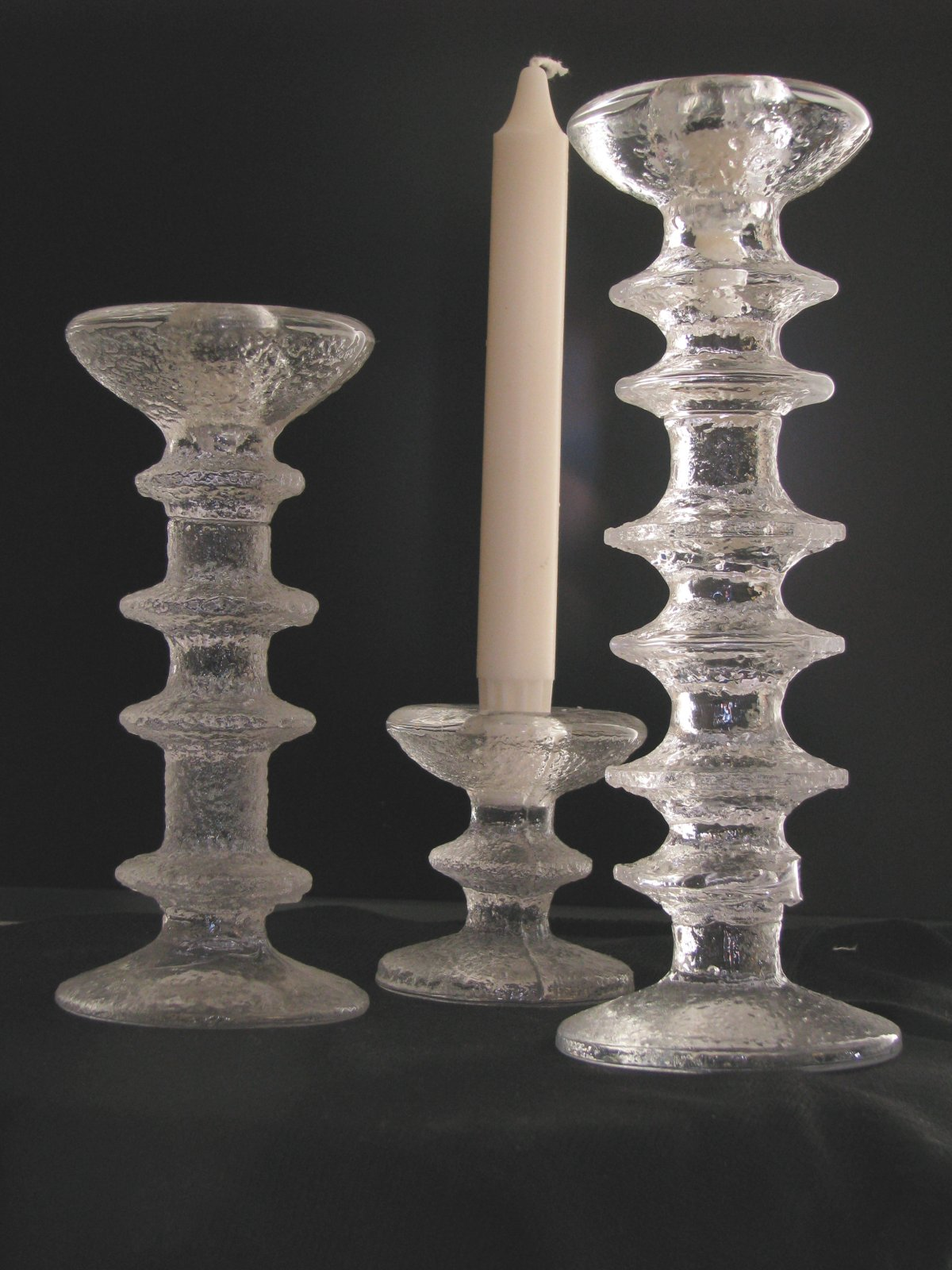
Candlesticks by Timo Sarpaneva

Iittala focuses on timeless design which can be seen not only in older creations but in the modern classics. For example, cookware Tools designed by Björn Dahlström in 1998; Heikki Orvola’s Kivi candleholders from 1988; Alfredo Häberli's ceramic Origo tableware designed in 1999 and the Essence glasses from 2001; Anu Penttinen's Vitriini from 2010 and the tableware Sarjaton using ceramic, glass, wood and textile as materials, designed by Harri Koskinen, Aleksi Kuokka, Musuta and Samuji in 2012.

Iittala products are made in China, Vietnam, Thailand and Romania. Some glassware is still made in Finland.

Iittala's i-logo in a red circle, designed by Timo Sarpaneva in 1956, was replaced by a new logo in "fire yellow" in 2024.

== History ==
In April 1881, in the village of Iittala in the southern province of Finland, the Swede Peter Magnus Abrahamson, after having left the Nuutajärvi glassworks, founded the Iittala Glasbruks Aktiebolag. Due to the lack of skilled glassblowers in Finland, the first 17 glassblowers came from the Limmared glassworks in Sweden. They, along with the local Swedish glassblower Johan Fredrik Gauffin, who was part owner, made the first glass objects on November 24, 1881.

In February 1888, Abrahamson left the loss-making Iittala glassworks, and Anders Andersson, the chairman of the board, took over the directorship of the Iittala glassworks. In 1865, the Swede Anders Norstedt resigned as administrator of the Nuutajärvi glassworks and moved to Helsinki to handle his business interests. By 1895, Anders Norstedt was the majority shareholder of the Iittala Glasbruks Aktiebolag.

Clas Norstedt, the son of Anders Norstedt, started at the Iittala glassworks in autumn 1895 as a clerk. Later he became the factory manager, and in spring 1896, after his father's death, Clas Norstedt was promoted to deputy director. Clas Norstedt was highly qualified and was the first Finnish professional in the field of glass, but he was content just managing and supervising technical aspects at the glassworks, so he traveled throughout Finland on many commercial business trips. It was during his tenure that the Iittala Glassworks enjoyed its first boom.

In 1898, a second directly fired glass furnace with five crucibles had to be built to meet demand. One furnace was used to blow pharmacy glassware, and the other furnace made household glass and crystal.

An initiative by Norstedt resulted in Iittala's iron mold foreman, Alfred Gustafsson, becoming the first in-house designer at Iittala Glassworks. In 1903, Gustafsson created the glass series "Great Men" to passively protest Russian rule.

In 1917, due to the First World War, raw materials began to become difficult to obtain, inflation caused prices to rise, and wages soared, resulting in Norstedt giving up the Iittala glassworks. Karhula Oy, part of the A. Ahlström Group (a timber refinery), bought the Iittala glassworks, and Norstedt resigned from the board in March 1917.

Up until 1910–1920, Iittala Glassworks produced glassware using imported molds, resulting in products that were very similar within Finland and abroad.

In time, the entire ownership of Iittala stock went to the Ahlström Group. Though Iittala no longer existed as an independent company, Iittala continued to have a separate corporate identity until 1935, when the Iittalan Lasitehdas Osakeyhtiö was formed with the Karhula Company. From then on, products were produced under Karhula-Iittala.

In 1932, Göran Hongell was hired by Karhula-Iittala and became the first designer hired for a Finnish glassworks. Hongell initiated collaboration between designers and glassblowers by bringing drawings to the glass workshop to ask about technical aspects of blowing the object.

At the Karhula-Iittala design competition in 1932, Aino Aalto's famous Bölgeblick won second place. Bölgeblick tumblers went into mass production in 1949. They were discontinued in 1960, but production restarted at the Karhula glassworks in 1983. Since 1994, the Iittala Glassworks have taken over the production, where they are still being made to this day.

With demand for bottles and glasses increasing since 1932, Hans Ahlström from the Ahlström Group started to modernize the Karhula and Iittala glassworks in 1935.

Ahlström officially divided the production of Karhula-Iittala products in 1937. Iittala Glassworks would concentrate on hand-blown glass, while Karhula Glassworks would take over all automated glass production. The plans, which had been around as early as 1933, were delayed because of WW2, though working methods and furnaces were modernized anyway in 1937. Some of the changes at the Iittala glassworks included the conversion of a single special crucible furnace and the old four-crucible furnace into six crucibles. An 8-crucible regenerative furnace was also built, but the substantially increased output did not change the fact that all exported Iittala products were still sold under the Karhula brand, and within Finland, Iittala products were still sold under Karhula-Iittala. After the taking over of the Viiala glassworks by Karhula Oy and Riihimäen Lasi Oy, a separate furnace for blowing electric lamps was built since the employees, as part of the deal, went to the Iittala glassworks.

During the Winter War and the Continuation War, part of the Second World War, production came to a halt due to shortages of materials and labor. Production restarted in 1946, and factory modernization was continued by Antero Järvinen. In 1947, a new gas center and compressed air system were built. The special single crucible furnace was converted into a day tub, and the six crucibles were upgraded to eight crucibles. Flame cutting was introduced, allowing for cleaner cuts than the cracking method. Järvinen also started to push an agenda to make design more prominent within the Iittala glassworks. This was continued when Hkan Södermaström became the administrator in 1950 and further pushed the Iittala glassworks to apply design to the entire range of products.

With much of Iittala's production being lamp glass for the international market, Valto Kokko was hired in 1963. He was not only responsible for designing lamp glass and printed matter, but he was also involved in advertising and exhibitions. Though lamp glass manufacturing profits were shrinking, a separate lamp glass factory was built in 1971. The new factory was used to produce lights for homes and public facilities. Industrial lights were first produced in 1975 for Ahlström's Varkaus paper mill.

Sales of their products in Finland were also continuously under competition from the ever-growing import of foreign glassware, but Iittala enjoyed continued success until the mid-1970s oil crisis, when it had to cut back on its operations. In 1981, Iittala was Finland's largest exporter of glass, accounting for 77% of exports. In 1983, Iittala Glassworks had 530 employees. Glass manufacturing was relocated to another Ahlström business unit in 1985 since Iittala was now focused mainly on exports.

In 1988, the owners of the Iittala glassworks, A. Ahlström Corporation and Wärtsilä, the owners of Nuutajärven Lasi, the Humppila glassworks, and Napapiirin Lasi, merged into Iittala-Nuutajärvi Oy. Ahlström retained 70% of the shares, and Wärtsilä retained 30%. Product collections stayed the same, but the brand name Iittala was used for exports.

In 1990, Iittala-Nuutajärvi Oy was sold to the Hackmann Group, which had acquired Arabia and Rörstrand-Gustavsberg. The Designor business area of the Hackman Group was renamed Iittala oy ab in 2003.

In 2004, the Italian ALI Group bought the Hackman Group and sold the business area Iittala oy ab to the Iittala management and the international private equity investment company ABN AMRO Capital.

In 2007, Iittala was bought by Fiskars and is now a group within the Fiskars Corporation. The operative management of Iittala holds 3 percent of the shares.

Structurally, the Iittala Group has been merged into Fiskars Corporation, and within the main 3 divisions of Fiskars are Home, Garden, and Outdoor.

== Design history ==
Thanks to a design archiving system created by Erkki Vesanto in 1936, all designs are not too closely related to each other.

With a few exceptions, until the 1920s Iittala's glassblowers, product models and designs still came from Sweden, Germany, Denmark and Belgium.

Iittala's first in house designer was Alfred Gustafsson. Through an initiative by then deputy director Claës Norstedt in 1903 Alfred Gustafsson created his most famous works, the glass tumblers series Great Men. This series was a passive protest against Russian rule and depicted men that were instrumental to Finnish society and culture.

The 1920s and '30s was Iittala's crystal age, in 1929 Iittala was recognized by the World Exposition in Barcelona for the crystals that were being produced at their glassworks.

In 1932 Göran Hongell, was hired by Karhula-Iittala and became the first designer hired for a Finnish glassworks. Hongell initiated collaboration between designers and glassblowers by bringing drawings to the glass workshop to ask about technical aspects of blowing the object. Karhula-Iittala also collaborated with many other designers including Gunnel Nyman and Lisa Johansson-Pape.

Aino and Alvar Aalto brought functionalism to Finland and Iittala in the 1930s. In 1932 Aino Aalto entered and earned second place in the Karhula-Iittala design competition with her Bölgeblick series. The glass was presented to international audiences in London in 1933 and at the Milano Triennial in 1936, where Aino Aalto won the gold medal. The design featured not just simplicity but a new functionalism, as they were stackable. Aino Aalto glasses are still being manufactured.

Alvar Aalto created the Aalto Vase in 1936. The piece was first displayed at the 1937 Paris World Exposition and remains in production at the littala glassworks more than 75 years after its introduction.

Antero Järvinen as director in 1946 had the foresight to set the stage for designers to become the driving force of Iittala and in a competition in Stockholm this played out with the entries not just being sandblasting and engraving but also designing an engraving to go on vases designed by Iittala's Göran Hongell. Tapio Wirkkala won first place and the 2nd and 3rd-place winner was Kaj Franck. Järvinen was very pleased with the outcome of the competition and Wirkkala and Franck were given free rein to design art glass at the Iittala glassworks. Thanks to the efforts of Kaj Franck and Tapio Wirkkala the attitude to glass changed. Clarity and refraction of light began to be appreciated from a new perspective.

Since the late 1940s, the designers Göran Hongell and Erkki Vesanto concentrated on serial production while Tapio Wirkkala and Kaj Franck focused on designing art glass. The results could be seen, with the Karhula-Iittala catalogue of 1949 being completely different than its predecessors and containing objects of beauty.

Göran Hongell's Aarne glass set, designed in 1948, was awarded a gold medal at the 1954 Milan Triennale – and is still in production.

Järvinen's push to make design more relevant was continued when Håkan Södermaström became the administrator in 1950 and further pushed the Iittala glassworks to apply design to the entire range of products. At the Fairs in Helsinki in 1950, Karhula-Iittala was awarded gold for their products and the public voted Tapio Wirkkala's Kantarelli as the most beautiful object at the exhibition.

The 1950s were a further highlight for Finnish design starting with the Milan Triennale from 1951 awarding Finland 25 prizes. 3 Grand Prix's were awarded to Tapio Wirkkala and Timo Sarpaneva received a Silver Medal. In 1954 another Grand Prix was awarded to Wirkkala. This was followed by the Milan Triennale awarding Timo Sarpaneva a Grand Prix in 1957.

In 1952 Kaj Franck, who was also the artistic director of Arabia, designed the Kilta series for Arabia. The design of this series, which was renamed into Teema in 1981 has all the core ideas and values of Iittala within it, incorporating high quality and multipurpose timeless design. Teema is still in production and new colours and sizes are regularly designed by Heikki Orvola and Oiva Toikka making sure that the new pieces keep the spirit of Franck's design.

Iittala set high standards for their products as Löflund recounts that Timo Sarpaneva's Orkidea of which only a few could be made in an hour sometimes had only one pass inspection and at times none at all were passed. The design and high quality of Iittala's products ensured Iittala receiving high praise throughout the world as their winning of the magazine House Beautiful's Most Beautiful Object of 1954, for Orkidea shows.

With the rise of art glass, designers’ names became the bases for sales and Timo Sarpaneva designed the red i-label for his i-collection which in 1956 became the symbol for the Iittala brand, albeit the Karhula name was still used for Iittala glassworks products in the early 1960s.

Kaj Franck designed the original cone shaped glass set Kartio in 1956.

Timo Sarpaneva's cast iron pot Sarpaneva from 1960 proved that the essential quality of materials can be reduced to the most basic essence by a creative imaginative artist.

Oiva Toikka created the dew drop glassware Kastehelmi in 1964, which along with Tapio Wirkkala's glasses Ultima Thule from 1968 are still in production today.

Oiva Toikka's best known design creations Birds by Toikka have been made since 1971.

In 1972 Heikki Orvola designed the Aurora set of glasses for Iittala. With Fujiwo Ishimoto he designed the Illusia tableware for Arabia.

Valto Kokko created his first extensive glassware set, Avec in 1973. His best known set Otso is from 1978 and since 1981 Otso is part of the collection of Modern Art in New York.

Heikki Orvola's Kivi candleholders from 1988 are another design.

The cookware Tools was created by Björn Dahlström in 1998 in collaboration with world class chefs.

In 1998 Stefan Lindfors designed the unconventional open-handled ceramic series Ego.

Working closely with select international designers resulted in designs that stayed true to the core values of Iittala but also expanded the shape of glasswares as can be seen with Alfredo Häberli's Essence glasses and carafe.

The striped ceramic eggcup by Alfredo Häberli in 2001 proved so successful that the entire range of Origo became striped, which made it an ideal counterbalance to Iittala's Teema designs.

Anu Penttinen's clear and strong coloured glass boxes Vitriini from 2010 marked another new direction for Iittala's products.

With a modern interpretation of Finnish traditions and 6 designers the tableware Sarjaton, meaning no series, as the colours and style are interchangeable, using ceramic, glass, wood and textile as materials, was launched in 2012.

== Designers ==
Göran Hongell (1902–1973)

Göran Hongell was one of the pioneers of Finnish glass tradition. Hired by Karhula-Iittala in 1932 he went on to become the first permanent designer to be hired by a Finnish glassworks in 1940. To create his glassware he worked with glassblowers to develop special techniques and colour hues. His creations were simple and unadorned, with a spirit of modernism combined with attenuated art deco.

- Designs for Iittala: Silko (1938); Maininki (1938); Säde (1939); Hongellin hattu (1941); Aarne (1948); Aulanko (1950s).
- Designs still in production at Iittala: Aarne (1948).
- Awards: Aarne (1948): gold - Milan Triennale (1954).

Aino Aalto (1894–1949)

Aino Aalto designed buildings, interiors, furniture, and textiles. She also designed together with her husband Alvar Aalto.

- Designs for Iittala: Bölgeblick series (1932); Aalto tumbler (in collaboration with Alvar Aalto - 1933); Aalto Flower (in collaboration with Aino Aalto - 1939).
- Designs still in production at Iittala: Bölgeblick, glasses, pitcher, plate - renamed Aino Aalto.
- Awards: Exhibition architecture for Artek: Grand Prix - Milan Triennale (1936); Bölgeblick (1932): gold - Milan Triennale (1954).

Alvar Aalto (1898–1976)

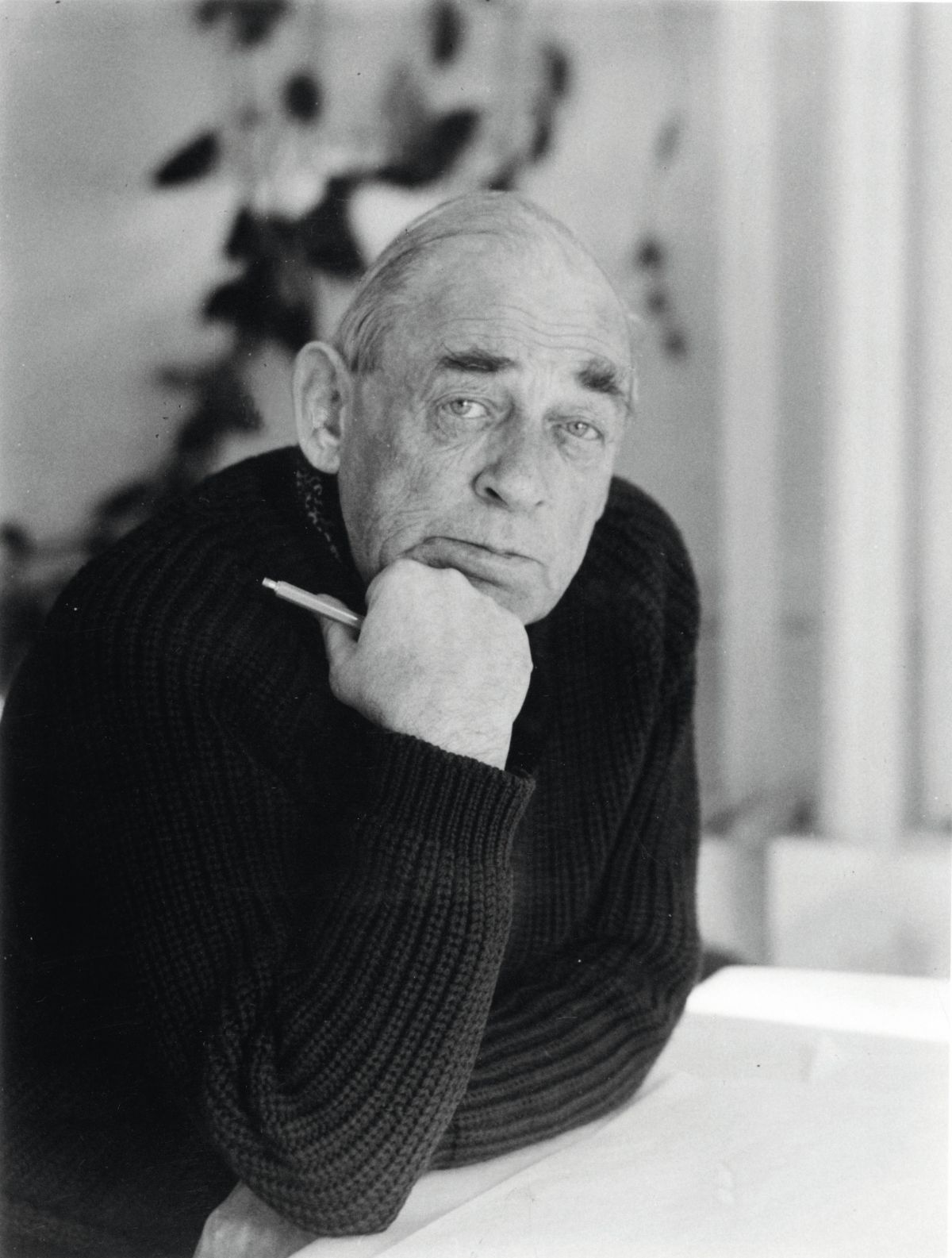
Alvar Aalto in 1960

Alvar Aalto and his wife Aino Aalto often collaborated in their design work.

- Designs for Iittala: Aalto tumbler (in collaboration with Aino Aalto - 1933); Aalto / Savoy bowl (1936); Savoy / Aalto vase (1936); Aalto / Savoy double (1936); Aalto Flower (in collaboration with Aino Aalto - 1939).
- Designs still in production at Iittala: Aalto collection, bowl, votive, vase, flower set.

Tapio Wirkkala (1915–1985)

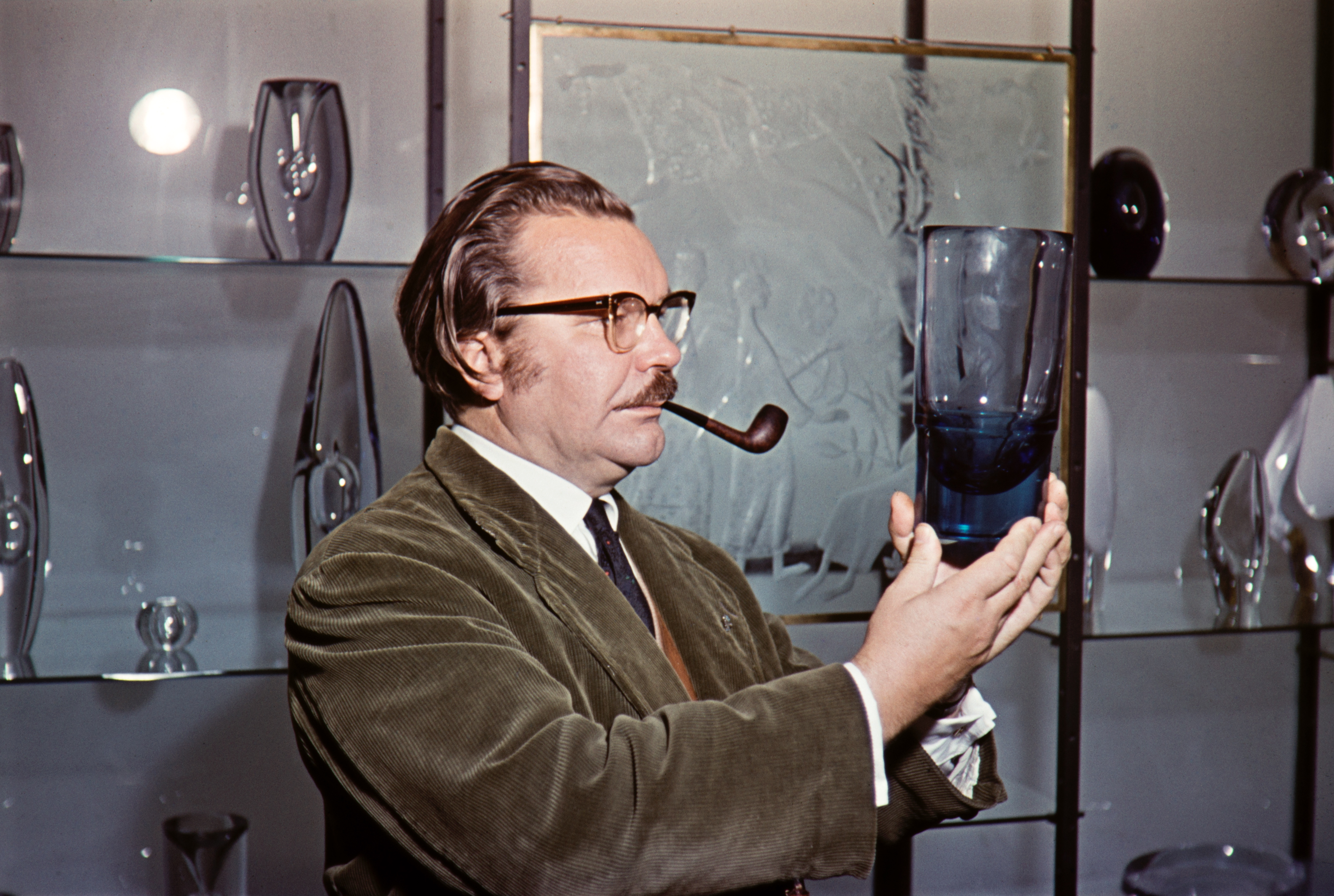
Tapio Wirkkala at the Iittala glass factory

Tapio Wirkkala designed banknotes, graphic art, sculptures, furniture, jewellery and glass products. He produced more than 400 glassware pieces and art glass pieces. Wirkkala was known for his work in glass making and his close collaboration with workers resulted in new techniques and design objects.

- Designs for Iittala: Finestra (1946); Pitsi (1947); Kantarelli (1951); Viinirypäle / Päärynä (1947); Kalvolan kanto (1948); Jääpala (1951); Jäävuori (1951); Tokio (1954); Tapio (1954); Marsalkansauva (1954); Rondo (1957); Romantica (1960); Paadrin (1960); Jäänsärkiä (1968).
- Designs still in production at Iittala: Kantarelli (Chantarelle); Gaissa; Ultima Thule; Tapio.
- Awards: Kantarelli, Viinirypäle / Päärynä, Varsanjalka, Kalvolan kanto, Tunturi, Jäkälä, Jääpala (1951); Jäävuori - Milan Triennale (1951); Tokio, Tapio, Marsalkansauva - Milan Triennale (1954); Tiima, Rondo - Milan Triennale (1957); Romantica (1960); Paadrin Jää - Milan Triennale (1960); Jäänsärkiä, Ultima Thule: bowl - Milan Triennale (1968); Lunning Prize (1951); Order of the Lion of Finland (1955); Prince Eugen Medal (1980).

Kaj Franck (1911–1989)

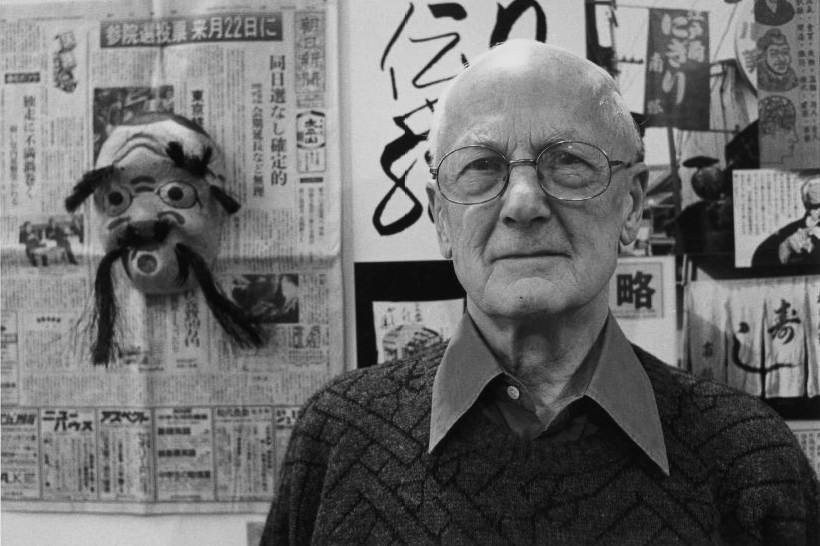
Kaj-Franck in 1989

Kaj Franck, the conscience of Finnish design would remove everything excessive so his designs would be left with only the essentials. Some of his most famous objects are the Teema tableware and the glass series Kartio.

- Designs for Iittala: "Kaivonkatsoja" (1946); Lakaisija (1946); Onkia (1946); Teema (Kilta) (1952); Kartio (1956); Tupa (1948).
- Designs still in production at Iittala: Teema; Kartio; Purnukka; Ateenan aamu.
- Awards: Milan Triennale (1951); Milan Triennale (1954); Milan Triennale (1957); Lunning Prize (1955); Order of the Lion of Finland (1957); Prince Eugen Medal (1964).

Alfredo Häberli (1964)

Alfredo Häberli is an international designer based in Zurich.

- Designs for Iittala: Essence (2001); Kid's Stuff (2001); Senta (2003); Tris (2003); Origo (1999).
- Designs still in production at Iittala: Essence; Senta; Origo.

Heikki Orvola (1943)

Heikki Orvola works with glass, ceramics, cast iron and textiles. In 1998 Orvola won the Kaj Franck prize.

- Designs for Iittala: "Aurora" (1972); Kivi (1987); Palazzo Pro Arte (1988); Verna goblet (1998); Verna vase (2004); Korento (2011).
- Designs still in production at Iittala: Kivi; Korento; Aurora.
- Awards: Kaj Franck Design Prize (1998); Order of the Lion of Finland (1984)

Timo Sarpaneva (1926–2006)

Timo Sarpaneva is a master of materials such as glass, porcelain, cast iron and textile as well as graphic art. Saraneva's I-line became the Iittala trademark in 1956. His works can be found in international art and design museums. Orkidea has been described as the most beautiful object on earth.

- Designs for Iittala: Lansetti II (1952); Orkidea (1954); tumbler i (1956); Tsaikka (1957); stackable bottle (1959); sarpaneva (1960); Festivo (1966); Claritas (1984).
- Designs still in production at Iittala: Tsaikka; Orkidea; Claritas; Festivo; Sarpaneva; Steel plate.
- Awards: I-line (1954); Lunning Prize (1956); Order of the Lion of Finland (1958); Honorary Doctorate: Aalto University (1993)

Oiva Toikka (1931)

Oiva Toikka is best known for his "Birds" collection which has so far produced 400 glass art objects. His Kastehelmi selection and range also enjoys great success.

- Designs for Iittala: Kastehelmi (1964)Flora (1966); Birds (1971); Annual Cube (1977); Niili (1989); Delta (1989); Vaskooli (1988); Full Moon (1989).
- Designs still in production at Iittala: Birds; Annual Cube; Kastehelmi.
- Awards: Lunning Prize (1970); Order of the Lion of Finland (1980); World Glass Now 85 (YEAR); Kaj Franck Design Prize (1992); Prince Eugen Medal (2001).

== Citations ==
=== References ===
- Riitta Nikula (ed), Heroism and the Everyday. Museum of Finnish Architecture, Helsinki, 1994.
