= Stockholm City Court =

Defunct court in Stockholm

- Stockholms rådhusrätt
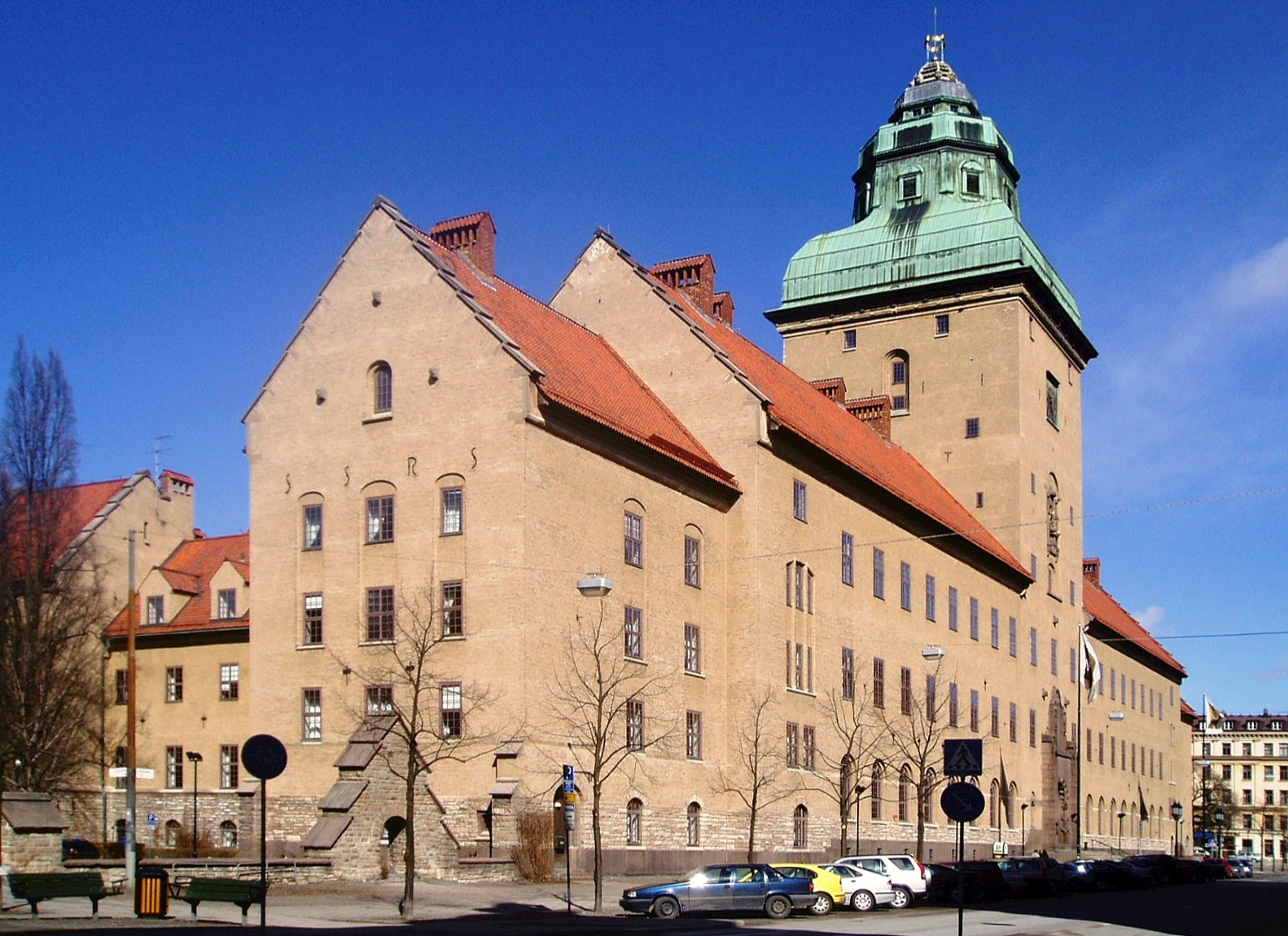
- Stockholm Court House where the city court was located from 1915 to 1971.
- Interactive map of Stockholm City Court
- 59°19′51″N 18°2′37″E
- Established: Middle Ages
- Dissolved: 1971
- Location: Stockholm
- Coordinates: 59°19′51″N 18°2′37″E
- Appeals to: Svea Court of Appeal

Stockholm City Court (Swedish: Stockholms rådhusrätt) was a city court in the City of Stockholm from the Middle Ages to 1971 when Stockholm District Court was established whose judicial district included the newly formed Stockholm Municipality. Stockholm City Court was located in Stockholm Court House from 1915 to 1971.

== History ==
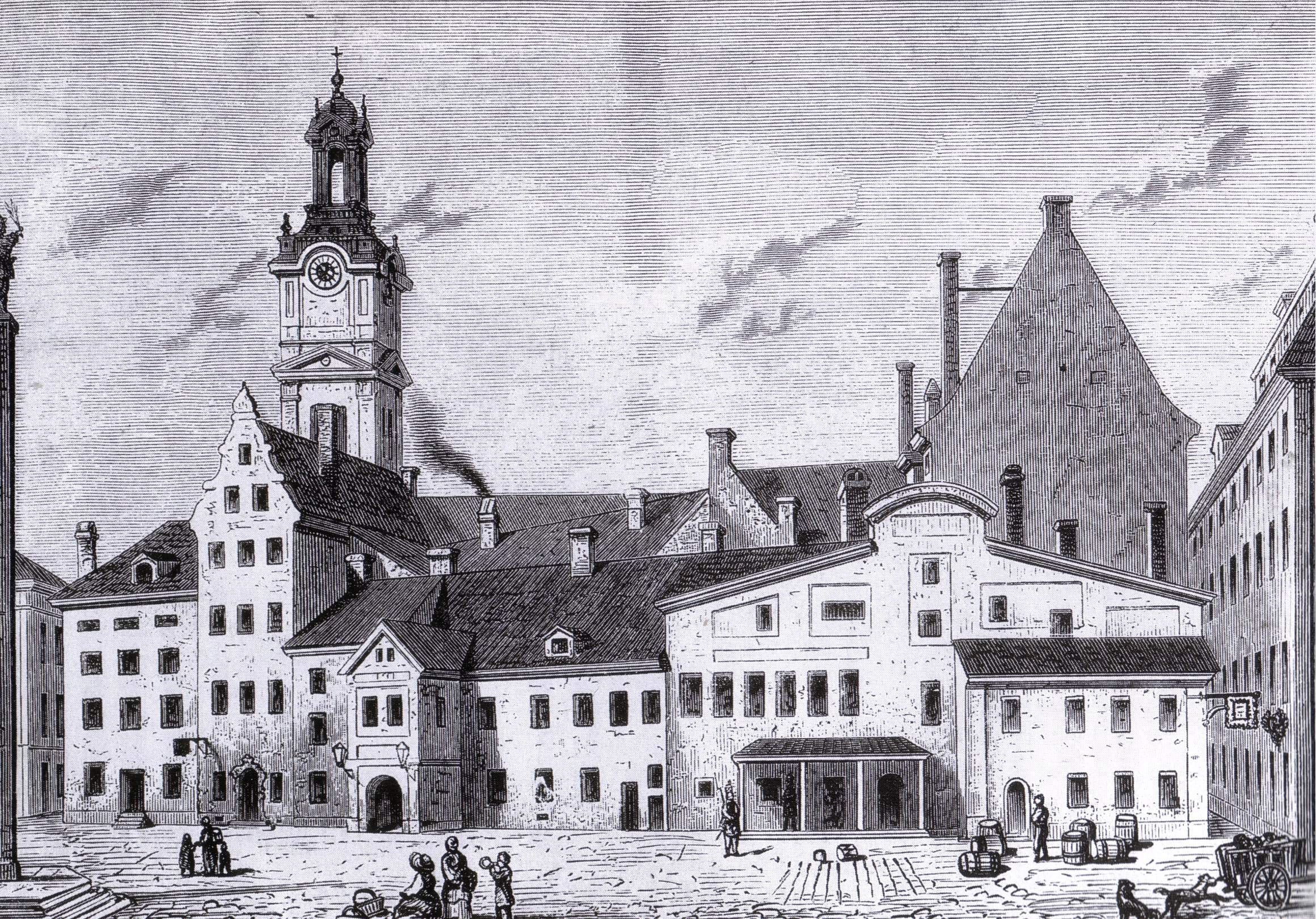
Rådstugan where the city court from the Middle Ages to 1732. Today its the Stockholm Stock Exchange Building.

=== Early history ===
Stockholm was under the jurisdiction of a city court (rådhusrätt) from the middle of the 13th century. Initially, the city court held its hearings in a town hall in the neighborhood Rådstugan (now Gamla stan) between Stortorget and the Storkyrkan and the southern cemetery. Not much is known about what this town hall looked like; it was likely no higher than two storeys tall and contained only one courtroom. The town hall was burnt down during a city fire in May 1330 when most of the city, including the castle and the church, were destroyed. The town hall was rebuilt on the same site as it had previously stood, and the neighboring house to the west was also bought and built together with the town hall. Between the buildings a walkway was constructed, called rådstugugången, which led from the old town hall over to the new courtroom in the neighboring house. A third courtroom was added after another fire in 1407, and at the end of the 1570s the building underwent several extensive repairs, both externally and internally. In the middle of the 17th century, the town hall began to become cramped, and the Governor of Stockholm Klas Fleming proposed in 1640 that a new town hall be built. This issue arose shortly after the magistrate's duties were divided into four colleges. However, there was no new town hall, and the premises problems were temporarily solved by all colleges except the College of Justice (Justitiekollegiet) moving to other premises in the city. In the 1660s and 1670s, the city court's overcrowding was discussed once again. No new town hall was built this time either, but instead another of the neighboring houses was bought, Braheska huset, and merged with the former town hall complex.

=== 18th and 19th centuries ===
In 1724, the city court bought a fourth neighboring property, the so-called Kanngjutarehuset at Stortorget. In the 1730s, however, the city court moved to new premises at Riddarhustorget in Gamla stan. In connection with this, the trial court (kämnärsrätt) took over some of the rooms in the Braheska huset. The new town hall was located in the former Bonde Palace. There were several reasons for moving: partly the old town hall had become too crowded, partly it was too costly with constant repairs and maintenance of the old buildings, partly the king and the magistrate wanted the city to have a dignified and suitable town hall. In February 1732, the new town hall was ready for occupancy. In December 1753, the town hall was seriously damaged in a fire and almost the entire building was destroyed. After the fire, the city court returned to the old town hall complex at Stortorget, waiting for the new town hall to be repaired. At the end of the 1750s, the premises could be used again. In the 1870s, complaints began to be made about the town hall's premises. The critics considered that these "were outdated and unsuitable for their purpose." Initially, there were plans to rebuild the old town hall or build new buildings on the adjacent plots.

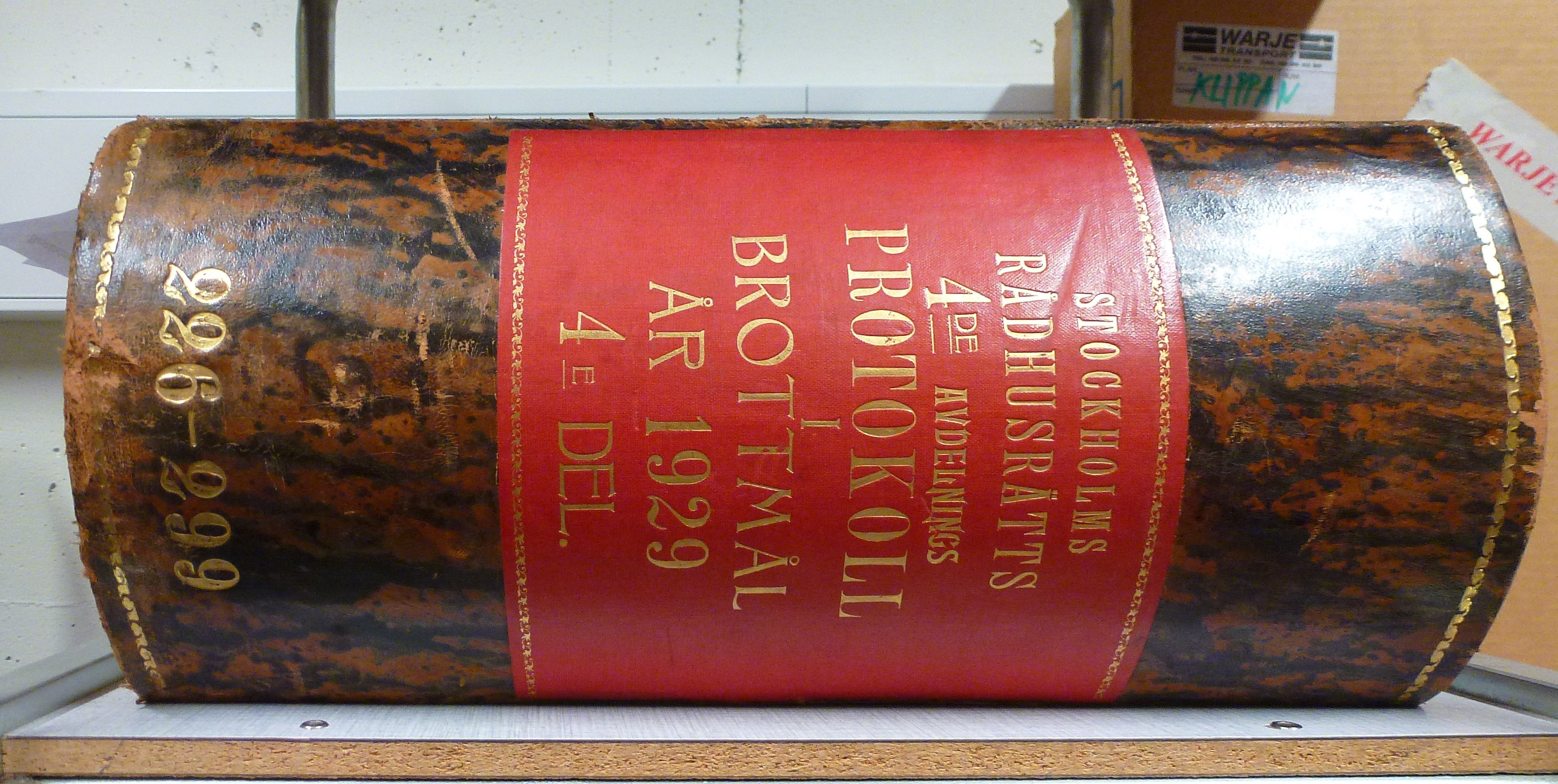
Stockholm City Court minutes from 1929 in the Stockholm City Archives.

=== 20th century ===
At the beginning of the 20th century, however, it was agreed to build a completely new town hall on the site of Eldkvarn, where the current Stockholm City Hall is located. In 1903, an architectural competition was announced where the competitors would submit proposals for the design of the town hall. The competition was won by Ragnar Östberg, who in 1906 was commissioned to design the new town hall. Östberg was finished with the sketches the following year, but then a motion was presented in the city council (stadsfullmäktige) which instead wanted to locate the new town hall in neighborhood of Fruktkorgenon Kungsholmen. In 1908, the city council finally decided that the new town hall would be located on Kungsholmen, and the idea of building on site of Eldkvarn was abandoned. Östberg's drawings were set aside, and the task of drawing the town hall now went instead to Carl Westman, who had finished in third place in the architectural competition in 1906. The construction work took place during the first half of the 1910s (1912–1915), and in the autumn of 1915 the new Stockholm Court House in National Romantic style at Scheelegatan was inaugurated. The new Stockholm police station had also been built in the same area during the years 1904–1912 (the police station was, so to speak, towards the back of the town hall, across Agnegatan). The town hall was built in two parallel larger lengths that were connected to each other by three different buildings. Initially, the town hall also contained housing for, among others, the doorman and the caretaker, as well as a restaurant. From the end of the 1940s, the public sector, and thus the municipalities, had been given more and more tasks: the education in Sweden had been expanded, social care and housing construction as well, all technical services in the form of electricity, sewer and water. In the early 1950s, the so-called Large Municipality Reform (Storkommunreformen) was implemented, and the smallest municipalities disappeared. The purpose of the reform was to create logical and rational municipal divisions. The bourgeois municipalities would be so large that they could offer the service that society could expect. The court territorial jurisdiction (domsaga) was also affected by the municipal changes and rationalized. The judicial districts became significantly larger than they had been before. Further municipal reforms were implemented in the 1960s and 1970s, when, among other things, the old stad concept disappeared. In 1965, the city courts were nationalized, as was the Stockholm City Court, and in the early 1970s the new lower court reform came into force. The assize courts (häradsrätt) and city courts (rådhusrätt) disappeared and were replaced by district courts (tingsrätt). The Tingshusbyggnadsskyldigen ceased at the same time. In 1971, the Stockholm District Court was established, whose judicial district included the newly formed Stockholm Municipality. As before, both the court and the chancellery were located in Stockholm.
