= Westman =

Westman may refer to:

- Westman Region, Manitoba, Canada
- Westman Islands, an archipelago off the south coast of Iceland
- Celts in Ireland were called Westmen in Old Norse

== People with the surname ==
- Alf Westman (1921–1998), Swedish hurdler, 1948 Summer Olympian
- Axel Westman (1894-1960), Swedish physician and university professor
- Benjamin Westman (born 1976), American-Swedish football manager
- Carl Westman (1866–1936), Swedish architect and interior designer
- Cody Westman (born 1978), Canadian filmmaker/musician
- Edvard Westman (1865–1917), Swedish painter
- Elisabeth Westman (born 1966), Swedish road cyclist
- Emil Westman (1894–1935), Swedish-Danish artist
- Erika Westman (born 1971), Swedish curler
- Frida Westman (born 2001), Swedish ski jumper
- Gunnar Westman (1915–1985), Danish sculptor
- Gucci Westman (born 1971), American makeup artist, cosmetic designer
- Hans Westman (1905–1991), Swedish architect
- Henrik Westman (1940–2019), Swedish politician
- James Westman (born 1972), Canadian baritone singer
- Johanna Westman (born 1969), Swedish children's book author and television host
- Jonas Westman (1909–1983), Swedish skier, 1936 Winter Olympian
- Karl Gustaf Westman (1876–1944), Swedish politician
- Karl Ivan Westman (1889–1970), Swedish diplomat
- Lars Westman (writer) (1934–2021), Swedish journalist
- Lars Westman (1938–2025), Swedish film maker and cartoonist
- Magnus Westman (born 1966), Swedish ski jumper, 1992 and 1992 Winter Olympian
- Nydia Westman (1902–1970), American actress and singer
- Richard A. Westman (born 1959), American politician
- Robin M. Westman (2002–2025), American mass shooter
- Roger Westman (1939–2020), English architect
- Rolf Westman (1927–2017), Finnish professor
- Tom Westman (born 1964), American reality TV personality
- Torsten Westman (1920–2012), Swedish architect

== See also ==
- Westmann (disambiguation)
