= Westmann =

Westmann may refer to

== People ==
- Stephan (Kurt) Westmann (1893 Berlin – 1964), German doctor who settled in England
- Alexander Westmann (1848 – 1923), Finnish Russian diplomat
- Editha Westmann (born 1963, Seesen), German politician
- Wilhelm Westmann (1813, Vienna – 1881, Vienna), Austrian architect

== Other ==
- Westmann Isles (Icelandic: Vestmannaeyjar), an archipelago of Iceland
- Vestmanna (Danish: Vestmannahavn) ("Westman Harbor")

== See also ==
- Westman (disambiguation)
- Westermann
- Westerman
