= Westermann (disambiguation) =

Westermann may refer to:

- Westermann, family name
- Westermann Verlag, German publishing house
  - Westermanns Monatshefte, German periodical

== See also ==
- Westerman
