= Historical fires of Stockholm =

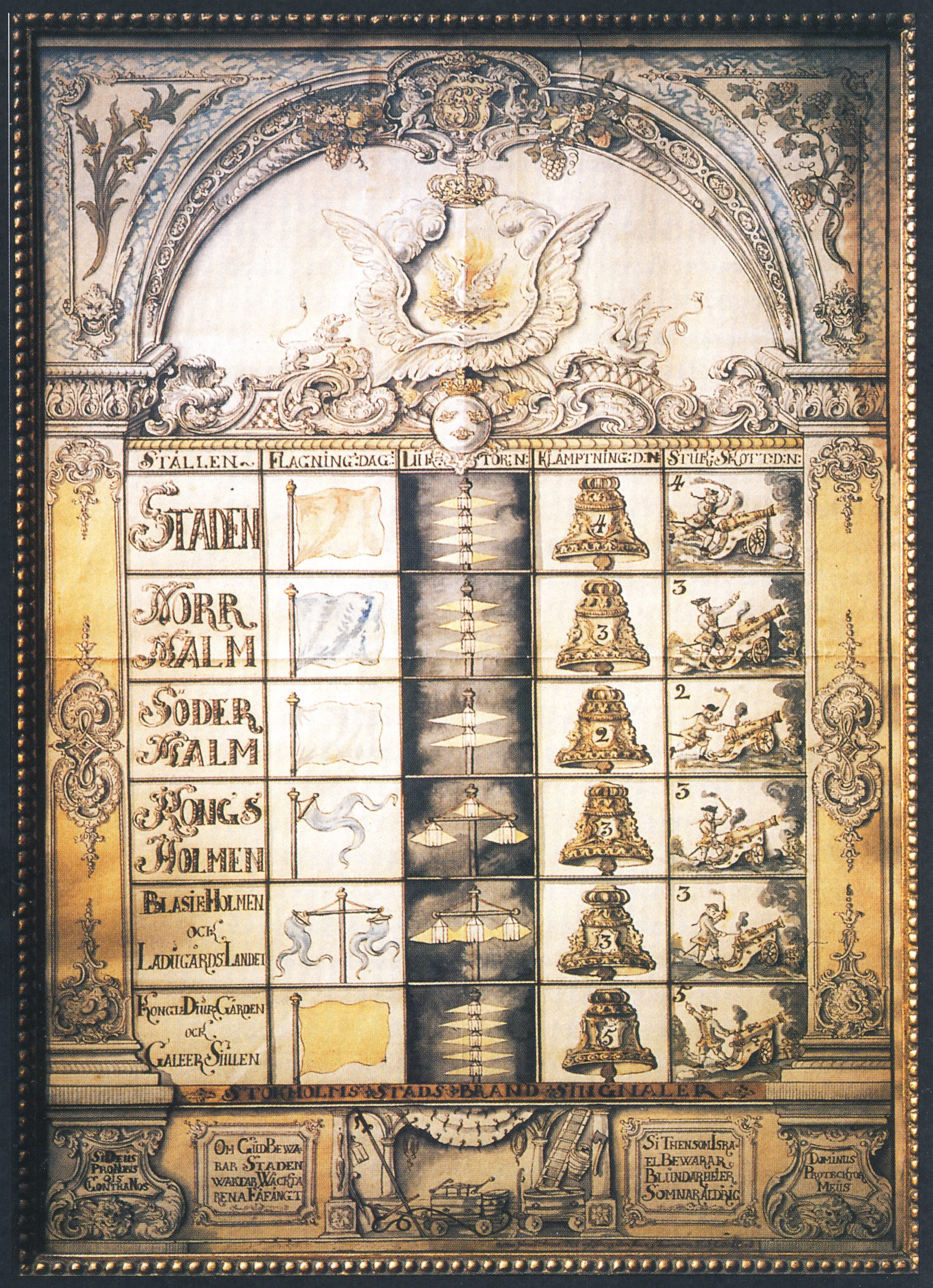
Stockholm fire signals in 1768

Stockholm has largely escaped looting and natural disasters, but the city's major scourges have been fires, which in the worst cases have wiped out entire neighborhoods. The population of Stockholm has historically lived in constant fear of the outbreak of fire, because the risk of fires in the 16th- and 17th-century Swedish cities was great. Each citizen remained on night watch well into the 19th century. The worst fire in the history of Stockholm was the fire of Clara in 1751, which evolved into a firestorm spreading from Riddarfjärden to Södermalm.

Only through fire retardant buildings, organized fire services, better fire fighting equipment, and running water from fire hydrants (after 1861), could fires be reduced and maintained. However, aside from the misery and damage that large fires caused in Stockholm, there were also benefits, such as the planning of new districts, neighborhoods, and streets.

== Fire protection, fire alarms and fire fighting ==
Even during the medieval period, the city laws had regulations to prevent the occurrence of fires. In 1661, Stockholm produced its first fire regime. Householders were required to shout in order to alert people to the outbreak of fire. The city was divided into districts headed by fire chiefs, and building owners were required to have some fire equipment, such as filling the house with water barrels during the summer.

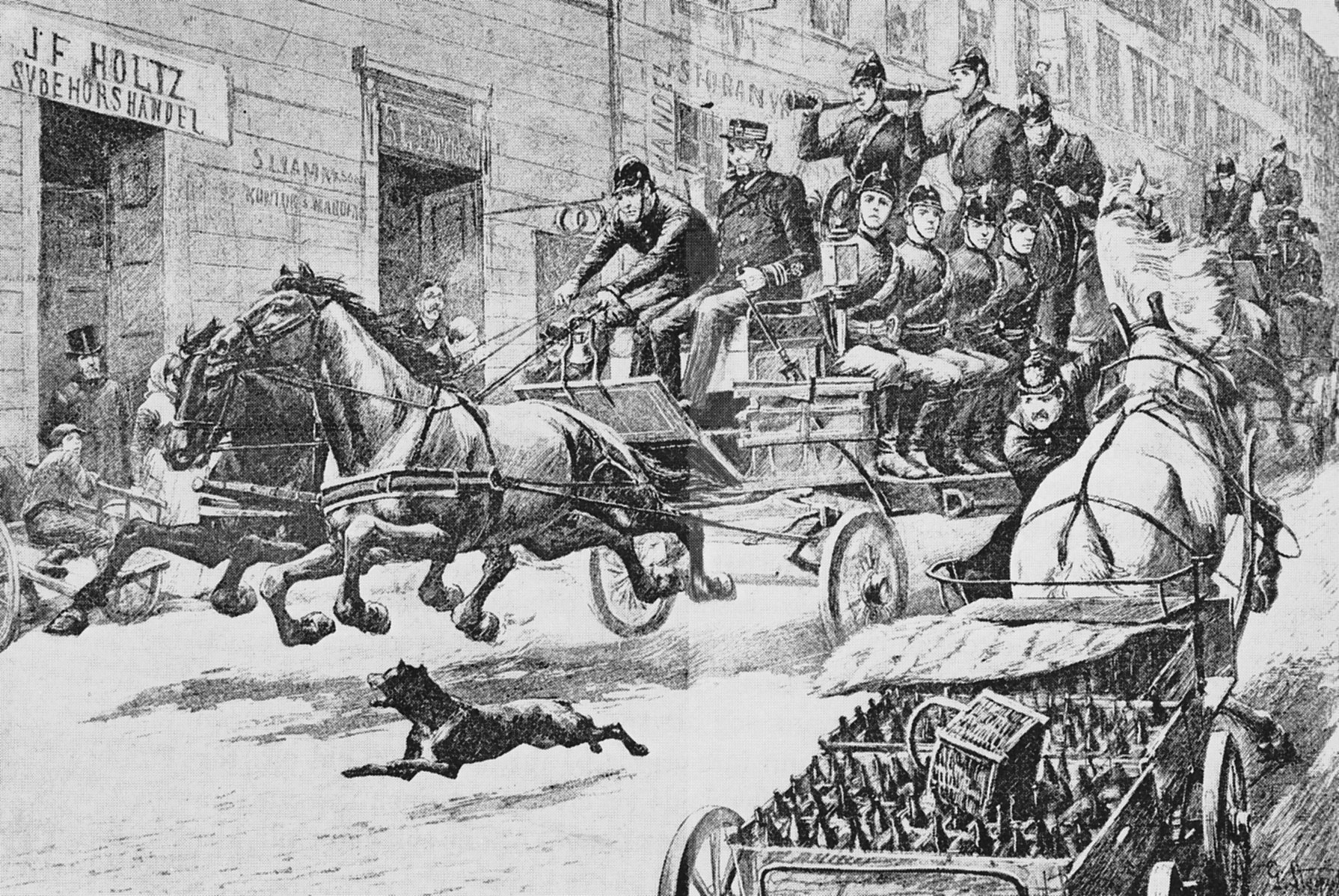
Stockholm Fire called out, 1880s

When a fire broke out, church bells would ring and the care tower (watch tower) on Brunk Hill would hoist different signals. In one case in Skeppsholmen, there was a fire on salute batteries, and a certain number of cannon shots alerted the people in the town that it was burning. A decree of December 18, 1728, established a series of measures to provide a warning in the event of a fire. The sighting of unusual smoke was to be immediately reported to the master or mistress (under penalty of a fine), who would then pass it on to the churches to see if they agreed with the tower watch. This system would alert the watchmen in the towers in every neighborhood in which there was a fire at night. Later, they used particular church bells, flags, and cannon shots to warn of a fire. A fire on Södermalm required two signals. In Norrmalm, on Kungsholmen, and on the peninsula of Blasieholmen, three signals were used. The Old Town had four, and on the island of Djurgården, five rings were sounded.

In 1731, a solid brandvaktskår was established, the precursor to the Stockholm fire brigade. The Fire Union was funded by the city treasury and also patrolled at night, but the "care" or night watch that every citizen was required to keep extended well into the 19th century.

In 1746, the Swedish insurance company Brandcontoiret was established in Stockholm. It supported the city's fire safety through grants to include water and better insurance policies for stone buildings. In 1828, the city's public Stood Fire Company was founded. The seat of the company's board was in the Ship's Bridge 20.

In 1875, a new fire regime appeared in Stockholm, which for the first time possessed a professional fire department. Stockholm would have seven fire stations and two main stations, one in Norrmalm and one in Södermalm. Previously, there had been eldsläckningsmanskap, but it was male volunteers who put out the fires.

== Fires before the 1600s ==
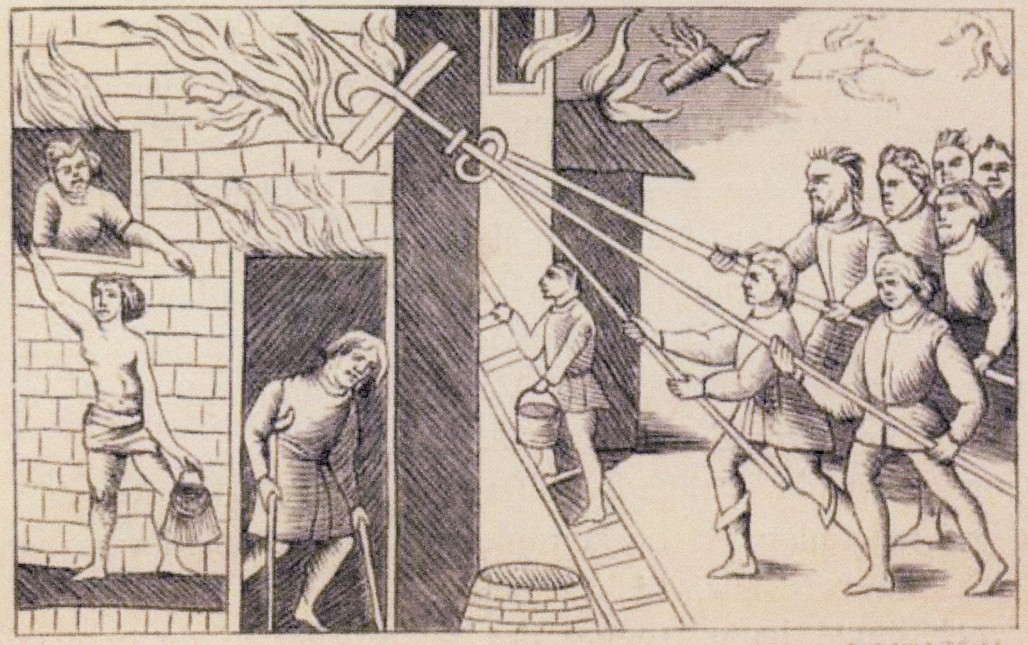
Fire-fighting in Stockholm in the 1500s

Throughout its history, Stockholm has been struck by many large fires, one of the oldest documented fires ravaging the city on April 14, 1297. The years 1330, 1344, 1407, 1411, 1419, 1445, 1458, and 1495 saw the city ravaged by major fires. The fire of 1407 was caused by a lightning strike and was alleged by some sources to have claimed up to 1,600 casualties. This fire destroyed many areas, including the Black Friars' Monastery of Stockholm.

After the year 1501, the building of wooden houses was banned inside the city walls. In 1552, the ban against fire hazards within the city was tightened so that the wooden houses in the town center were to be demolished and replaced with stone. However, there were still flammable wooden buildings, such as outhouses and sheds, left in the yard.

In 1555, there was a fire on Stadsholmen's west side outside the new city wall, and all the houses from the Great Gråmunkegränd to Kornhamnstorg burned to the ground. They caught fire in pitch at the newly built fort along the shore. In order to fight the fire, individuals had to run to the east side of Stadsholmen to collect water to extinguish the fire.

== Fires in the 1600s ==
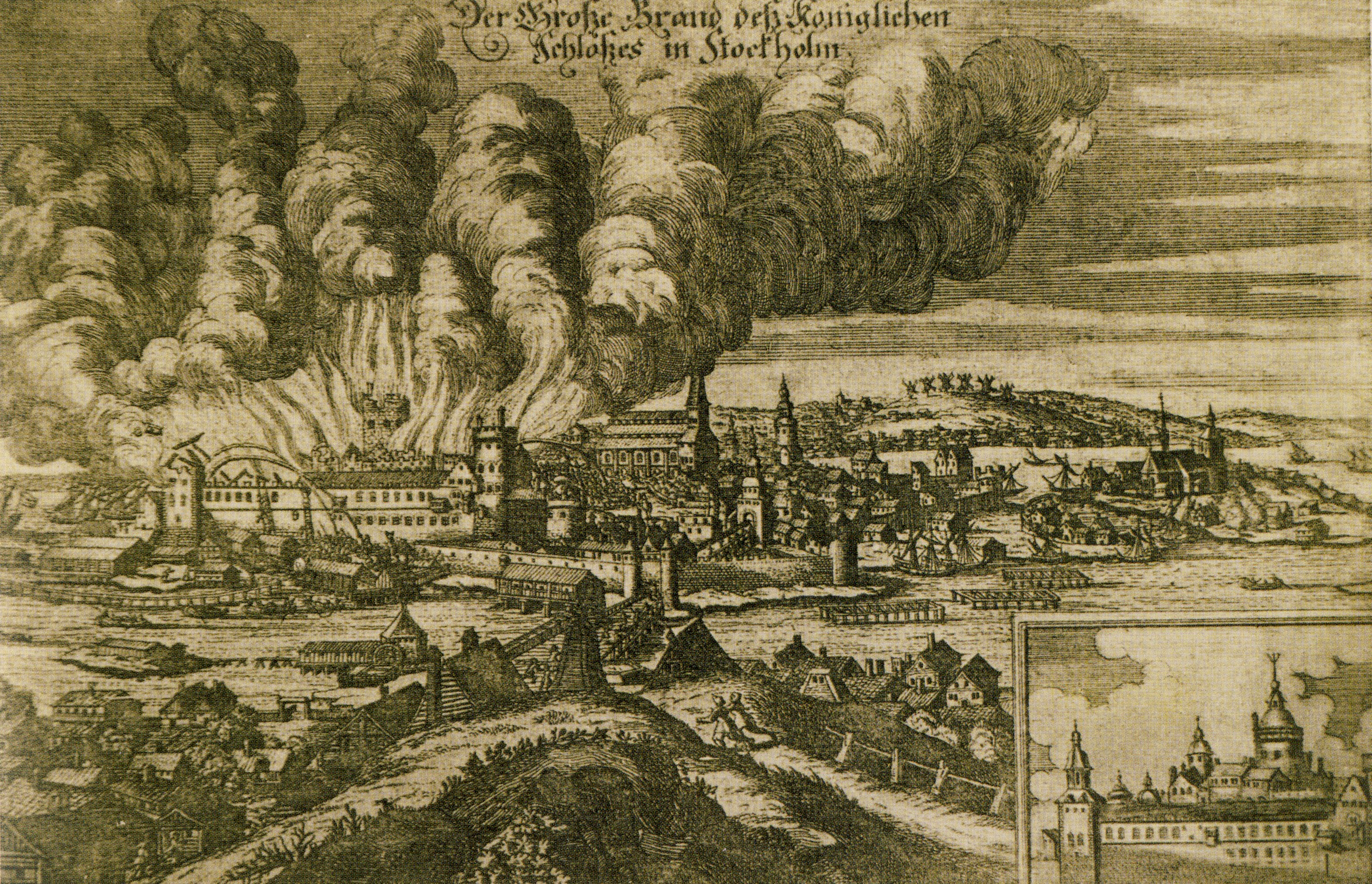
Palace fire in 1697

Among the first fires that broke out on a large scale prior to the city plan changes was the Great Fire in 1625 that devastated the southwestern parts of Stadsholmen. The fire began in the evening of September 1, 1625, in a house along the bottom at Kåkbrinken and extended all the way up to the West Long Street stone house, and for some time the German church was under threat. The fire lasted three days and destroyed a fifth of the infrastructure of Stockholm at the time.

The fire resulted in the building of a new city over the burnt areas. Here was built the city's first main street, called Great King Street (now Stora Nygatan). The transformation is considered to be Stockholm's first settlement. Another consequence of the fire disaster was a tightening of the fire prevention measures, in which the fire chief and master of rotation would inspect chimneys and brädtak, and ensure that the houses had the mandatory fire fighting equipment.

After a fire in 1642 that devastated the eastern part of Brunkebergsåsen and destroyed 247 houses, the city planned part of Government Street to become the main street. It was the beginning of street regulation during Clas Larsson Fleming in the neighborhood that is now called Östermalm. To help prevent the spread of fire, stringent rules were created to put pressure on landowners to build stone houses, rather than the more flammable wooden ones.

Another major fire during the 1600s was the Tre Kronor fire on May 7, 1697, during which the castle was completely destroyed, except for the newly constructed north wing. Most of Sweden's former national archives and the royal library were destroyed. Afterwards, the palace architect Nicodemus Tessin the Younger designed a brand new Royal Palace.

== Fires in the 1700s ==
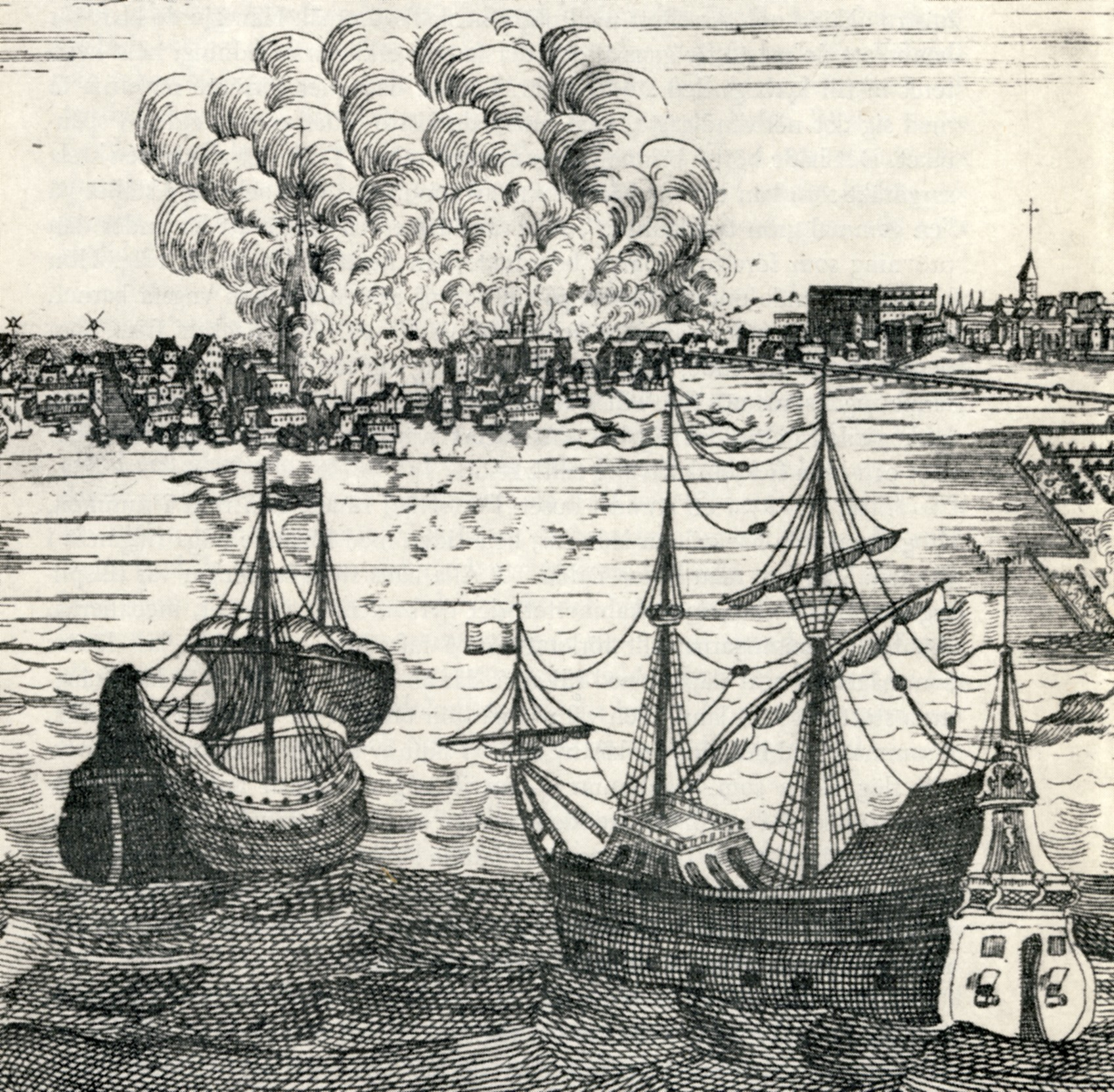
Fire of Clara in 1751

Despite all precautions and new regulations, large fires continued to break out in Stockholm. Approximately 200 houses burned down in Norrmalm in 1719, while the Catherine fire in 1723 destroyed 500 houses, as well as other buildings and the Katarina Church on Södermalm. On the night of May 1, 1723, a fire began in a mill in the Maria Church and spread eastward, resulting in the collapse of the Catherine Church dome and the tower.

The fire of the Catherine Church in 1723 was not the only church which caught fire in that year. During a night between May 14 and 15, a violent storm raged over Stockholm. Lightning struck St. Jacob's Church (today the King's Garden) and Clara Church. Jacob's Church tower was burned and destroyed, while Clara Church received minor damage.

The worst fire that Stockholm survived occurred in 1751. It broke out in Norrmalm, developed into a firestorm, and spread from Riddarfjärden (an arm of the lake Mälaren) to Södermalm. Klara Church was badly damaged and 221 houses were completely destroyed. Brandcontoiret in Stockholm intended to pay about 784,000 dollars in insurance money, but it lacked the funds to cover the full amount. Only some of the affected homeowners had insured their houses, so the total cost of the fire was significantly higher than that sum. One person who was hit hard by the fire was geologist and mineralogist Daniel Tilas, whose house was completely destroyed. The fire demolished not only his home, but also the materials that he had gathered during 20 years of work and that would have been a Swedish and a global mineral history collection. His life's work had gone up in smoke. There was panic in the population that the fire was deliberately set, namely by one suspected arsonist.

In 1759, the city was hit again by a disastrous fire to the same extent as the Clara Church fire eight years earlier. In Sweden, this fire is named Mariabranden (Swedish brand= fire). The Mary fire in 1759 in the Maria parish in Södermalm destroyed 300 houses and the Maria Magdalena church. About 2,000 people were left homeless. The fire broke out on Thursday, July 19, 1759, in a bakery at a fishmonger in the appellate Hill (currently Brännkyrkagatan) at Mary Hill. At the time, there was a severe drought no water with which to fight the fire. Fire officers were advised to act logically, and it was decided not to extinguish the house that burned down, but rather to "counter-fire with a vengeance" further away.

Outside Sweden, this fire is most famous due to an occult anecdote that claims that the Swedish scientist and mystician Emanuel Swedenborg, through a sort of clairvoyance, "saw" the fire from Gothenburg. In the original Swedish edition of Lars Berquist's biography of Swedenborg, the date of the dinner in question is given as "July 29," but in the English translation this is corrected to "July 19," the very day of the fire. There is nothing else in Berquist's account that suggests that Swedenborg's report took place any time later than the 19th.

== Fires in the 1800s ==
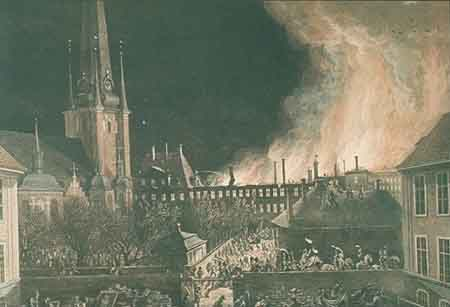
Riddarholm Fire 1802

Due to factors including more and more houses were built in stone, fire was no longer used for heating, lighting, and cooking, and a professional fire department had been created, large urban fires ceased in the late 19th century. However, fires in individual buildings such as palaces, factories, and churches were still common.

The 19th century began with a fierce fire, the Riddarholm fire, which ravaged Riddarholmen on November 15, 1802. The fire started early in the morning in the Administrative Court's old house (Cruuska palace) and was caused by a guard master's negligent use of fuel. The fire quickly spread to the southern side of the house and lit the roof of the old King's House (Wrangel Palace), destroying many antiques, including the nearly 300-year-old woodcut Blood Carlsbad painting that was stored in the Administrative Services Archives of Wrangel palace.

Another palace destroyed in a major fire was De la Gardie Palace at Norrström, south of King's Garden. In 1793, the theater was rebuilt. During a show on November 24, 1825, someone detected the smell of smoke on stage. Actor Lars Hjortsberg urged the audience to evacuate the hall. All spectators escaped unharmed, despite the theater only having one narrow exit. However, the fire still caused three casualties amongst the staff. The damage was extensive, but the remains of the buildings were salvaged.

Lightning striking church towers and tall buildings, which then acted as lighting conductors, were a common cause of fires. On July 28, 1835, Riddarholmskyrkan was hit by lightning and, at the same time, lightning struck the bottom of the Katarina Church and Kungsholms church tower. The Riddarholmskyrkan towers could not be saved. The church roof and the vault collapsed the following day after having caught fire, although the church hall survived. The new tower at Riddarholmskyrkan was built in 1841, and was made of cast iron to better withstand fire.

Factory buildings were also victims of flames. On January 22, 1842, fires burned down A. Bergman's cotton spinning mill at Stadsgården. The building and 1,000 fathoms of wood burned up. The fire was so strong that onlookers across the Salt Lake on Skeppsbron were showered with soot and sparks. The fire that had started in the factory's gas works caused more casualties, and led to 200 people losing their jobs when the factory abandoned the flammable gas and moved operations to Harg at Nyköping, where they could use water power instead.

Late in the evening of November 11, 1873, a fire broke out in the Palinska house, resulting in the deaths of several people. The city realized that this could have been prevented with a time and purpose under fire. The fire led to the acceleration of the ongoing work with Fire Guard, and the formation of the Stockholm fire in the 1875-year fire regime.

The nights of June 19 – December 20, 1875, saw a fire sweep through the central printer. This fire killed four people, and Heinrich Neuhaus' unique panorama of Stockholm was destroyed. The panorama, which was in the process of printing, as well as the lithographic stones, were rendered useless.

The most famous factory fire was Eldkvarn in eastern Kungsholmen, which burned on October 31, 1878. The event gave rise to the phrase "not since Eldkvarn burned" in the sense of "a very long time ago". Eldkvarn was a steam-powered mill, hence the name. The fire, believed to have been caused by flour dust falling onto a gaslamp which ignited, started just before 17:01 two floors up in the northeast corner of the house no. 1 at Hantverkargatan. The mill could continue to grind after the fire and was used up to 1906. On the Eldkvarn plot, with the block name of Eldkvarn, the Stockholm City Hall was later built.

The same year that Eldkvarn burnt, a fire broke out in the German Church in the Old Town. Such a church fire in the middle of Old Town could have been disastrous, but the new fire department quickly responded and prevented the fire from spreading. The fire started early on the morning of October 7, 1878. This time, Stockholm's church bells were tolled, reminiscent of the old methods of warning of a fire. The church's 16th century spire collapsed with its bells on the church vault, but the interior survived. In 1886, the church received its current tower.

== Fires since 1900 ==
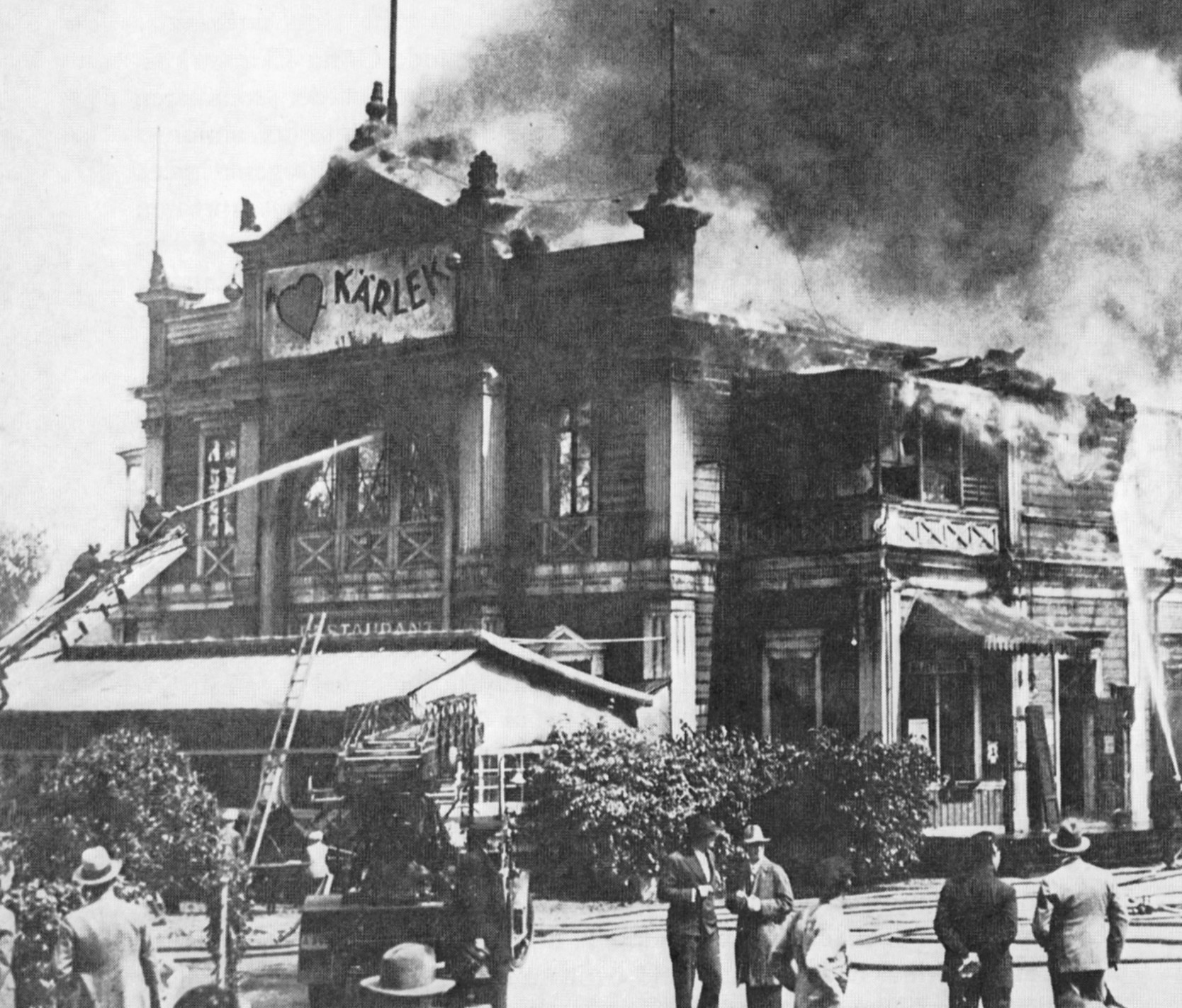
Djurgården Theater fire in 1929

The Djurgården Theatre at Skansen on Djurgården Southern was twice ravaged by fire. Fire broke out at the old Djurgården Theatre on May 19, 1865, destroying the building just when the theatre was beginning its second season. It was rebuilt and re-inaugurated on 20 June 1867. On 21 June, 1929, the building went up in flames again and the wooden building disappeared in a few hours. The fire had begun in the kitchen area and spread quickly. Although the people who were in the building managed to save themselves, some firefighters had minor injuries. How the fire started could not be clarified.

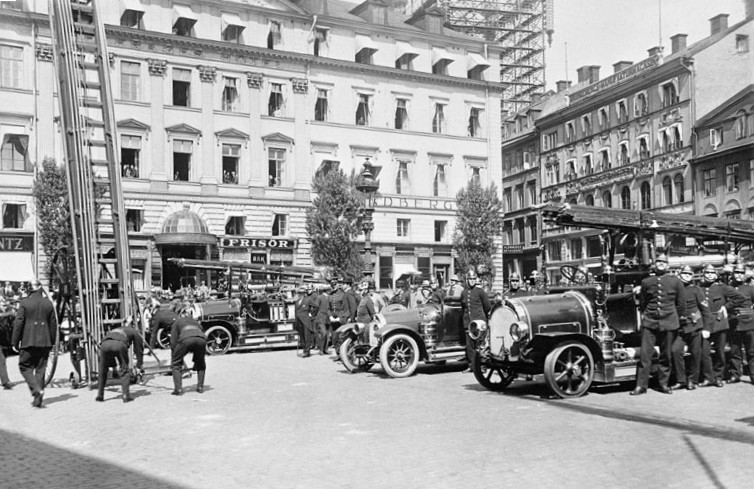
Fire Meeting on Brunkebergstorg 1921

One of the worst fires the Stockholm Fire Brigade experienced since its formation in 1875 was a fire in 1937 in the central dairy at Torsgatan. The fire broke out on February 8, 1937, caused by a welder working in the attic above the fourth floor. He first attempted to extinguish the fire himself, but failed. The fire brigade was alerted and quickly arrived on the site. The men not only had to fight the fire, but also work under difficult conditions, including heavy ice (the temperature was 10 degrees below zero) and a wax layer of 3,500 kg, which began to melt and burn, and hindered the firefighters considerably. Two firefighters were cut off by the fire. One hung outside a window and fell, later dying of his injuries. The other was rescued at the last minute. Some acetylene cylinders exploded, injuring another firefighter. A stairwell threatened to collapse and officers had to withdraw the men. In the end, all of Stockholm's firefighters engaged in fire extinguishing, and all the firefighters were called to duty. In total, there were 70 people on the site, including managers, the fire chief, firefighters, and teachers from officers' school. Only after seven hours was the fire considered to be under control. The damage cost over a million dollars and Stockholm's milk supply was threatened.

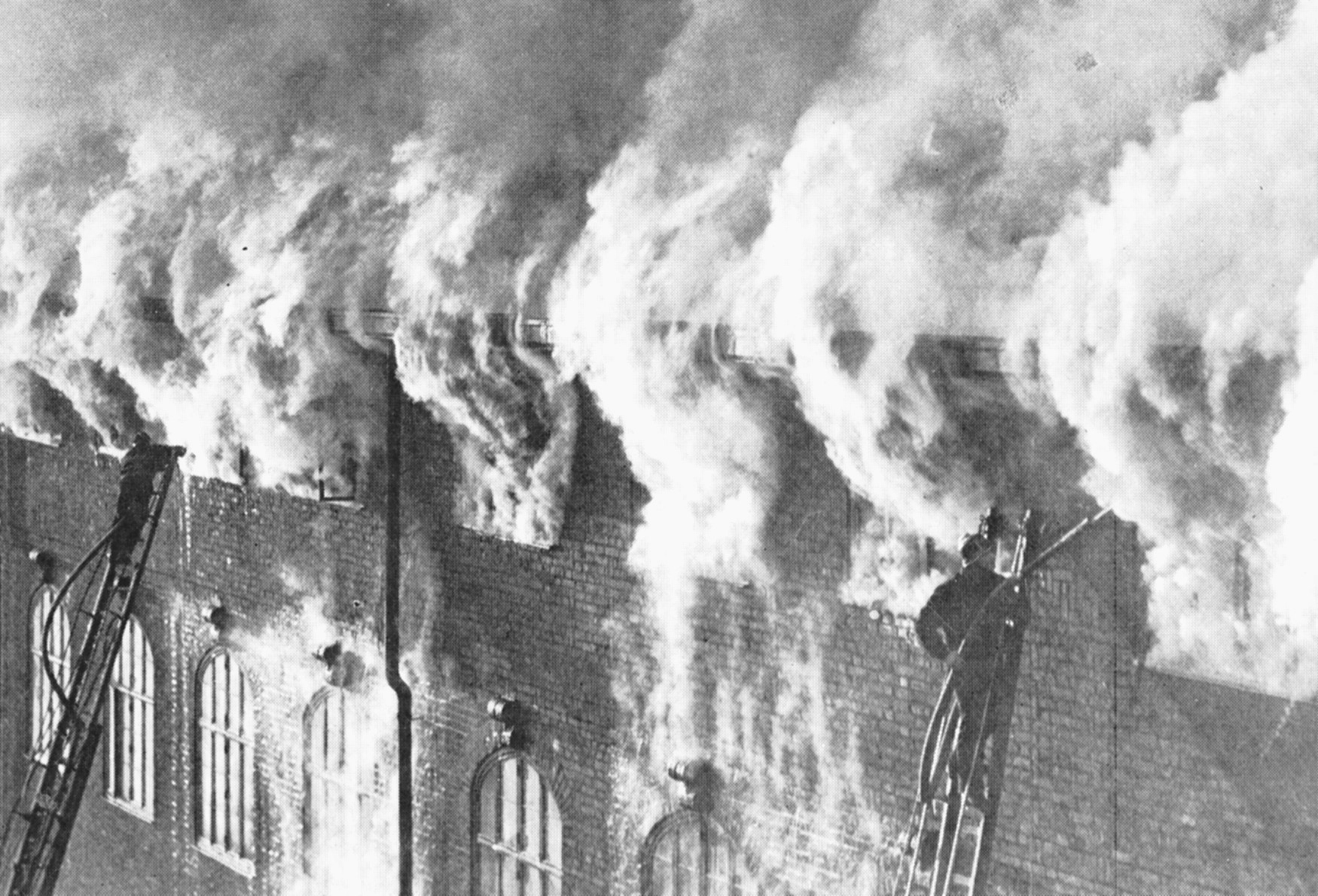
Milk Centre Fire of 1937

On September 5, 1970, IKEA's furniture warehouse at King's Curve burned. The cause of the fire was a short circuit in the large billboard. Codan paid an indemnity of 23 million; it was at that time the largest insurance loss in Sweden.

During the night of May 17, 1990, Catherine's Church burned for the second time. The church tower collapsed and went through the church vault. All that was left was the church walls, but a few valuable textiles and church silver were saved. An investigation into the cause of the fire was inconclusive.

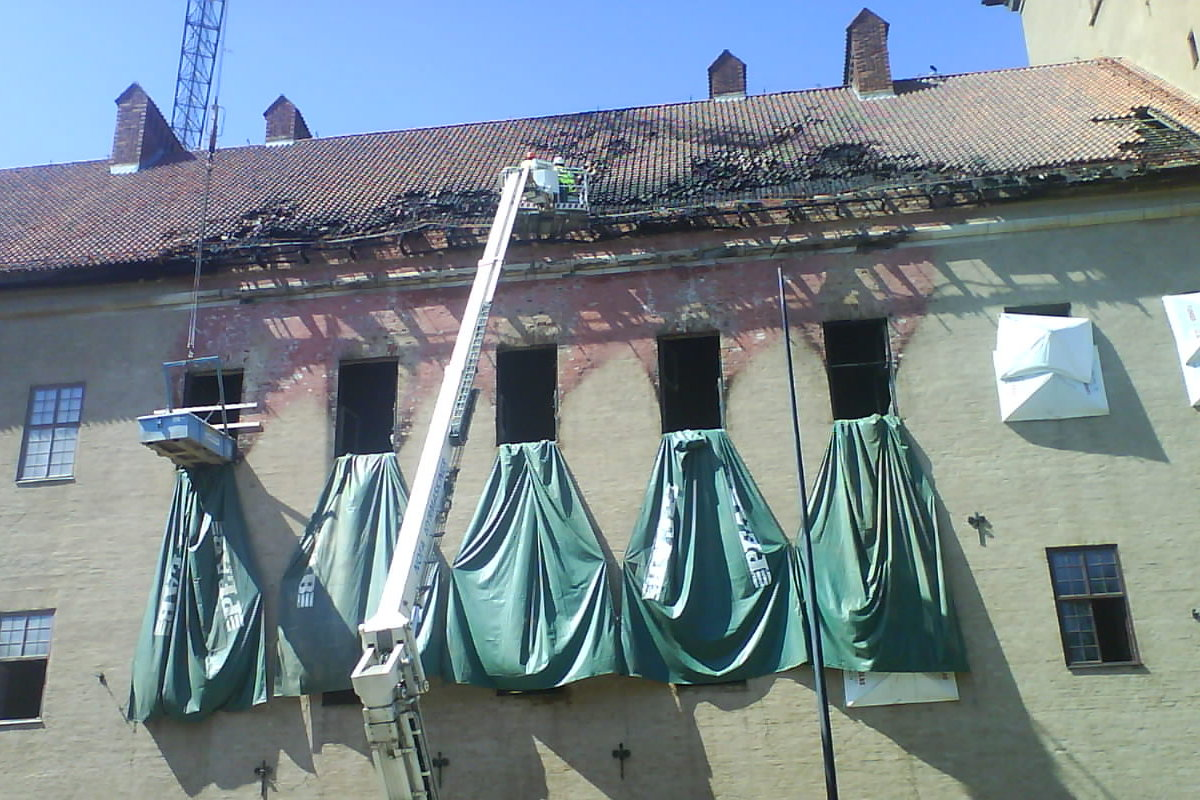
The fire in the Stockholm Court House in June 2008

Another notable fire hit Stockholm in 1990. On 28 September 1990, there was a large fire in the iron trade, John Wall's premises at the corner of Drottninggatan and Slöjdgatan. The fire destroyed the historic hardware store and a large part of the settlement in the district of Adam and Eve.

At two o'clock on the night of June 5, 2008, a fire broke out on the third floor of the Court House's west wing. It took up to 70 firefighters about three hours to control. The fire in the Town Hall was dramatic and, when emergency services arrived at the building, it was a fully developed fire, five- to 10-foot-high flames reached out of the windows. The fire department estimated that the entire third floor of the south wing was destroyed by fire. Since renovation work was being carried out, the building was empty and no people were hurt.
