= Listed buildings in Södermanland County =

There are 55 listed buildings (Swedish: byggnadsminne) in Södermanland County.

== Eskilstuna Municipality ==
Image	Name	Premises	Number of buildings	Year built	Architect	Coordinates	ID
	Öster-, Västerrekarne häraders tingshus	Stengeten 3, 4	10			59.36843°N 16.51934°E	21300000012760
	Kvarteret Stövaren 18	Stövaren 18	7			59.36805°N 16.52015°E	21300000012762
	Televerkets hus	Vinkelhaken 3	1			59.37147°N 16.51519°E	21300000012757
	Jäders prästgård	Övlingeby 1:7; Previously Övlingeby 1:5	4			59.41010°N 16.69816°E	21300000012768
	Rademachersmedjorna	Vallonen 8	12			59.37380°N 16.50764°E	21300000012763
	Stora Sundby slott	Stora Sundby 17:1	12			59.27111°N 16.12345°E	21300000012782
	Torshälla kvarn	Mjölnaren 1	1			59.42131°N 16.47073°E	21300000012775

== Flen Municipality ==
Image	Name	Premises	Number of buildings	Year built	Architect	Coordinates	ID
	Bogårdens komministerbostad	Bogården 1:1	3			59.06026°N 16.84307°E	21300000012795
	Flens station	Orresta 4:1, 3:7	2			59.05736°N 16.58851°E	21300000012790
	Harpsunds herrgård	Harpsund 5:1, 6:1; Previously Harpsund 5:11	14			59.09885°N 16.48441°E	21300000012806
	Hällefors bruksherrgård	Hällefors bruk 1:116	3			59.15349°N 16.48773°E	21300000012814
	Malmköpings tingshus	Lagmannen 1	1			59.13452°N 16.72787°E	21300000012797
	Orresta gård	Stamhemmanet 1	2			59.05568°N 16.59370°E	21300000012789
	Von Rosens jaktstuga	Helgesta Gård 2:5; Previously Brotorp 1:1; Helgesta-Lund 1:4	1			59.05019°N 16.81954°E	21300000012791
	Ådö kaptensboställe	Ådö 1:1	13			59.03392°N 16.77865°E	21300000012793
	Åkerö säteri	Åkerö 1:1	3			58.89292°N 16.57128°E	21300000012788

== Gnesta Municipality ==
Image	Name	Premises	Number of buildings	Year built	Architect	Coordinates	ID
	Stationshuset	Gnesta 4:31	1	1907	Folke Zettervall	59.04821°N 17.31171°E	21300000012833
	Björnlunda gamla prästgård	Björnlundagården 1:8; Previously 1:9	2			59.07009°N 17.14688°E	21300000012832
	Elghammars herrgård	Älghammar 1:2	17			59.05880°N 17.07930°E	21300000012820
	Heby herrgård	Heby 5:1	3			59.13896°N 17.21286°E	21300000012843
	Kramphults pörte	Herrökna 3:3; Previously 1:1, 2:1	1			59.12461°N 16.91790°E	21300000012836

== Katrineholm Municipality ==
Image	Name	Premises	Number of buildings	Year built	Architect	Coordinates	ID
	Gamla posthuset	Katrineholm 4:2; Previously 4:1	1			58.99692°N 16.20955°E	21300000012858
	Claestorps herrgård	Klastorp 1:1	22			58.96288°N 16.12288°E	21300000012872
	Eriksbergs slott	Eriksberg 1:1	6			58.93282°N 16.37880°E	21300000012870
	Hagbyberga herrgård	Hagbyberga 4:1	6			58.85644°N 16.55839°E	21300000012856
	Holbonäs säteri	Hålbonäs 2:1	4			59.03982°N 16.51729°E	21300000012863
	Katrineholms järnvägsstation	Katrineholm 4:1	1			58.99685°N 16.20826°E	21300000012860
	Spetebyhalls herrgård	Speteby 2:24, 2:17, 2:18	7			58.99568°N 16.41067°E	21300000012861
	Östra Vingåkers kyrkstall	Hastferstäpporna 1:1; Previously Östra Vingåkers kyrka 1:1	1			58.96834°N 16.11336°E	21300000012873

== Nyköping Municipality ==
Image	Name	Premises	Number of buildings	Year built	Architect	Coordinates	ID
	Residenset	Residenset 8	1	1806		58.75341°N 17.00842°E	21300000012887
	Tingshuset	Tingshuset 1 Previously Väster 1:9	1	1909–1910	Carl Westman	58.75535°N 17.00137°E	21300000012876
	Nyköpingshus	Nyköpingshus 1	5	1100–talet		58.74842°N 17.01152°E	21300000012877
	Pihlska gården	Åvallen 1	4	1720s		58.75177°N 17.01539°E	21300000012885
	Sankt Anna sjukhus Hospitalet	Sjukvårdaren 12; Previously 11	1	1799		58.75668°N 17.00662°E	21300000012895
	Stora Kungsladugården	Stora Kungsladugården 2:1	10			58.74495°N 16.96911°E	21300000012874
	Tistads herrgård	Tista 2:5	25	1630s	Fredrik Wilhelm Hoppe	58.82430°N 16.89065°E	21300000012875
	Ullaberg	Karreby 1:2	1	18th century		58.83049°N 17.11527°E	21300000012896
	Vida regementsskrivarställe	Vida 1:5, 1:6; Previously Vida 1:1	9			58.74499°N 16.92154°E	21300000012899
	Östermalma herrgård	Östra Malma 2:2; Previously 2:1	9	1650s		58.95107°N 17.15792°E	21300000012900

== Oxelösund Municipality ==
Image	Name	Premises	Number of buildings	Year built	Architect	Coordinates	ID
	Gamla vattentornet i Oxelösund	Oxelö 7:62	1			58.66896°N 17.11720°E	21300000012905
	Hävringe båk	Fiske 1:1	none			58.60332°N 17.31372°E	21300000012909

== Strängnäs Municipality ==
Image	Name	Premises	Number of buildings	Year built	Architect	Coordinates	ID
	Kvarteret Generalen 8	Generalen 8	2			59.38106°N 17.01764°E	21300000012951
	Kvarteret Jägmästaren 4	Jägmästaren 4	1			59.37213°N 17.03161°E	21300000012952
	Biskopsgården	Bispen 3	4			59.37483°N 17.03626°E	21300000012937
	Domkapitelhuset; Även kallat Konsistoriehuset	Kyrkberget 3	1			59.37547°N 17.03312°E	21300000012938
	previously stathuset Byggeback	Aspö-Lagnö 1:11	1			59.47766°N 17.08285°E	21300000012910
	Lyktan; Gamla biskopsgården	Kyrkberget 1	1			59.37469°N 17.03438°E	21300000012943
	Gamla gymnastikhuset	Brokikaren 1	1			59.37555°N 17.03657°E	21300000019915
	Grassegården	Grassegården 1	5			59.37787°N 17.03149°E	21300000012944
	Gripsholms slott	Gripsholms slott 1:1	47			59.25665°N 17.21128°E	21300000012921
	Gropgården	Helsingen 3	4			59.37829°N 17.03173°E	21300000012946
	Kungsbergs kungsgård	Kungsberg 2:1	8			59.43923°N 16.93589°E	21300000012913
	Lektorsgården; Även kallad Malmenius gård	Brokikaren 1	1			59.37540°N 17.03735°E	21300000012956
	Paulinska huset Även kallat Ulfhällska huset	Domherren 1	1			59.37471°N 17.03512°E	21300000012957
	Rektorsgården	Bispen 1, 4	1			59.37523°N 17.03636°E	21300000012966
	Roggeborgen	Kyrkberget 9	1			59.37567°N 17.03595°E	21300000012967
	Räfsnäs kungsgård	Rävsnäs 3:8; Previously 3:1	11			59.30729°N 17.24984°E	21300000012978
	Strängnäs kvarn	Mjölnaren 1	1			59.37930°N 17.02983°E	21300000012953
	Tryckerihuset	Kyrkberget 4	1			59.37577°N 17.03310°E	21300000012970
	Tullstugan	Skolmästaren 2	2			59.37377°N 17.03278°E	21300000012974
	Tynnelsö slott	Tynnelsö 1:5	1			59.41238°N 17.10047°E	21300000012996
	Villa Parma	Majoren 3	1			59.38104°N 17.01586°E	21300000012975
	Ångbåtsbryggan i Mariefred	Mariefred 2:20	1			59.25724°N 17.22597°E	21300000012928

== Trosa Municipality ==
Image	Name	Premises	Number of buildings	Year built	Architect	Coordinates	ID
	Garvaregården	Garvaregården 1, 2	8			58.89786°N 17.54580°E	21300000013008
	Långmaren	Långmaren 1:1	9			58.83421°N 17.40311°E	21300000013024
	Rönnebo pensionat	Trosa Rönnebo 1 o3 Trosa 10:50; Previously Rönnen 1	6			58.89465°N 17.54546°E	21300000013010
	Tureholms slott	Tureholm 2:1	10			58.89763°N 17.51602°E	21300000013020
	Bokö fyrkur	Bokö 1:5	1			58.85229°N 17.60420°E	21000001530460
