= Estermann =

Estermann may refer to:

- Alois Estermann (1954–1998), senior officer of the Swiss Guard, murdered in his apartment in the Vatican City
- Immanuel Estermann (1900–1973), experimental physicist, working of molecular beams. Brother of Theodor Estermann.
- Theodor Estermann (1902–1991), mathematician, working in analytic number theory. Brother of Immanuel Estermann.
- Yvette Estermann born as Gavlasova (born 1967), Swiss politician, member of the National Council from the Canton of Lucerne

== See also ==
- Osterman
- Westermann
