= Stockholm City Hall =

Seat of Stockholm city government

- Stockholm City Hall seen from Riddarholmen (2026)

General information
- Status: Completed
- Type: Government offices
- Architectural style: National Romantic style Romanesque revival
- Location: Ragnar Östbergs Plan 1 Stockholm Sweden
- Coordinates: 59.3275°N 18.055°E
- Construction started: 1911
- Completed: 1923
- Owner: City of Stockholm

Height
- Height: 106 m (348 ft)

Design and construction
- Architect: Ragnar Östberg

Stockholm City Hall (Swedish: Stockholms stadshus, Stadshuset locally) is the seat of Stockholm Municipality in Stockholm, Sweden. It stands on the eastern tip of Kungsholmen island, next to Riddarfjärden's northern shore and facing the islands of Riddarholmen and Södermalm. It houses offices and conference rooms as well as ceremonial halls. It is the venue of the Nobel Prize banquet and is one of Stockholm's major tourist attractions.

== Site and construction ==
Aerial view of Stockholm City Hall located on the island of Kungsholmen.

In 1907, the city council decided to build a new city hall at the former site of Eldkvarn. An architectural design competition was held, which first resulted in the selection of drafts by Ragnar Östberg, Carl Westman, Ivar Tengbom jointly with Ernst Torulf, and Carl Bergsten. After a further competition between Westman and Östberg, the latter was assigned the construction of the City Hall, while the former was asked to build Stockholm Court House. Östberg modified his original draft using elements of Westman's design, including the tower. During construction, Östberg constantly reworked his plans, resulting in the addition of the lantern on top of the tower, and the abandonment of the blue glazed tiles in the Blue Hall.

Oskar Asker was employed as construction leader and Paul Toll, of builders Kreuger & Toll, designed the foundations. Georg Greve also assisted in preparing the plans. Construction took twelve years, from 1911 to 1923. Nearly eight million red bricks were used. The dark red bricks, called "munktegel" (monks's brick) because of their traditional use in the construction of monasteries and churches, were provided by Lina brickworks of Södertälje.

The building was inaugurated on Saturday 23 June 1923, which was believed to be the 400th anniversary of Gustav Vasa's entrance into Stockholm in 1523. However, the anniversary was actually on 4 July, because it occurred on 24 June 1523 in the Julian calendar, which would be 4 July 1523 in the Gregorian. Verner von Heidenstam and Hjalmar Branting delivered the inaugurational speeches.

== Architecture and style ==
A panoramic view of Stockholm City Hall

Stockholm City Hall is an example of National Romantic style. The site, overlooking Riddarfjärden, inspired a central motif, namely the juxtaposition of city architecture and water that represents a central feature of Stockholm's cityscape as a whole.

The hall's style is one of refined eclecticism, blending massive, austere, Northern European brick construction with whimsical elements reminiscent of Venetian Gothic architecture, such as turrets adorned with golden starlets, decorated balconies, wooden masts, and statues.

"Blå hallen" (Blue Hall)

The Blue Hall (Blå hallen), with its straight walls and arcades, incorporates elements of a formal courtyard. Its walls are in fact without blue decorations; the name derives from Östberg's first draft, and is notable as the dining hall where banquets are held after the annual Nobel Prize award ceremony.

"Gyllene salen" (Golden Hall)

The organ in the Blue Hall, with its 10,270 pipes, is the largest in Scandinavia. Above the Blue Hall lies the Golden Hall (Gyllene Salen), named after the decorative mosaics made of more than 18 million tiles. The mosaics make use of motifs from Swedish history. They were executed by the Berlin, Germany, firm of Puhl & Wagner (Gottfried Heinersdorff), after nine years of negotiations by Gottfried Heinersdorff (1883–1941) for the commission.

The southeast corner of the building, immediately adjacent to the shore, is dominated by a monumental tower topped with the Three Crowns, the Swedish national symbol. The tower is 106 metres high and is accessible by lift or a 365 step staircase. The eastern side of its base is decorated with the gold-plated cenotaph of 13th century Swedish statesman Birger Jarl.

Stockholm City Hall has been the location of a number of cultural productions, including the 1991 music video Fading Like a Flower (Every Time You Leave) by Swedish pop duo Roxette.

The Blue Hall has also served as a venue for the Stockholm Culture Awards ceremony.

== Stadshusparken ==
The small park between the building and Lake Mälaren's shore is adorned with several sculptures, among them Carl Eldh's ensemble representing the artists August Strindberg, Gustaf Fröding and Ernst Josephson, as well as Eldh's bronze sculptures "Sången" and "Dansen" ("The Song" and "The Dance"). To the south-east of the city hall, facing Riddarholmen, is a pillar topped with a statue of Engelbrekt Engelbrektsson.

== Gallery ==
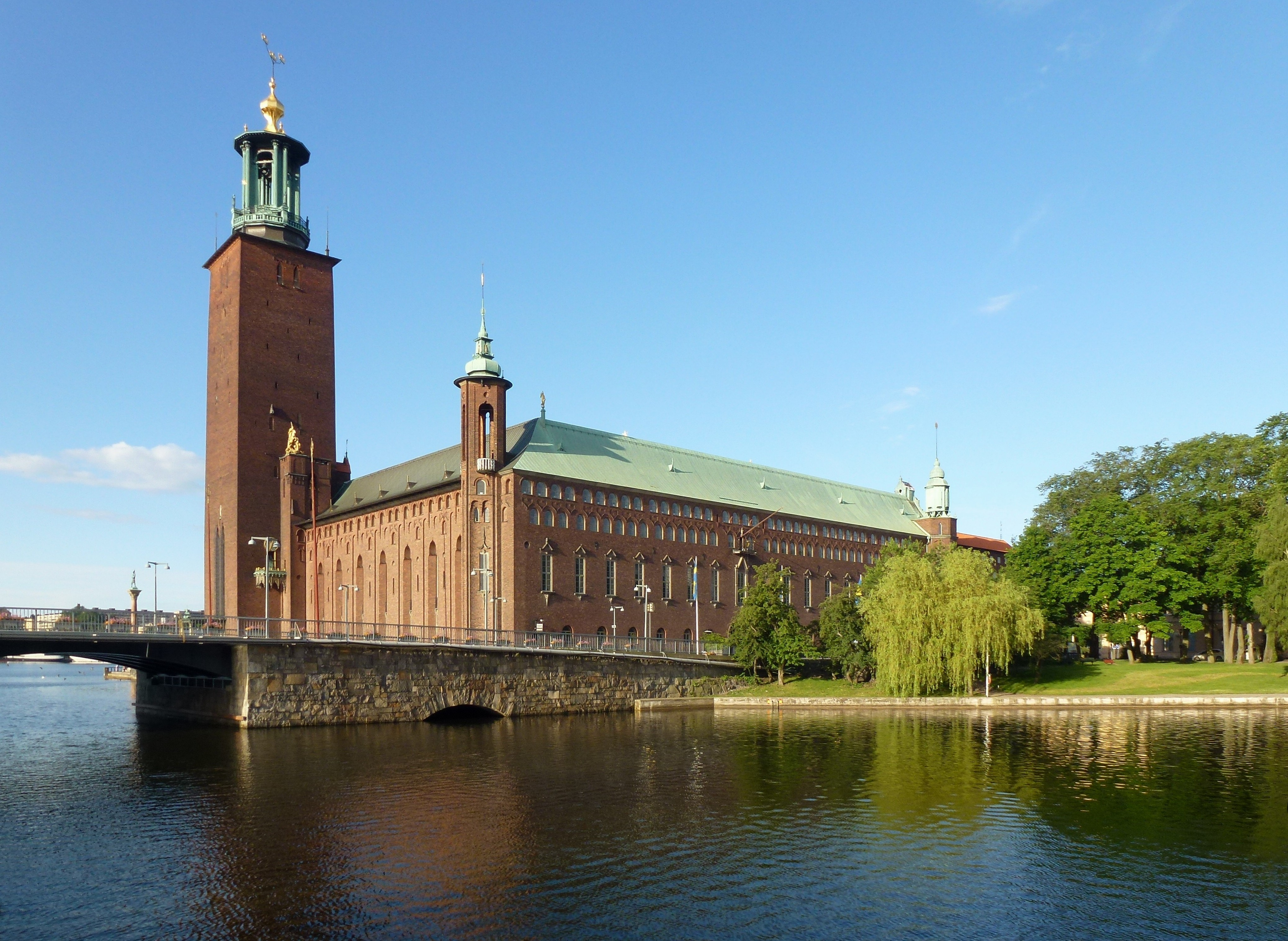
Stockholms City Hall Tower

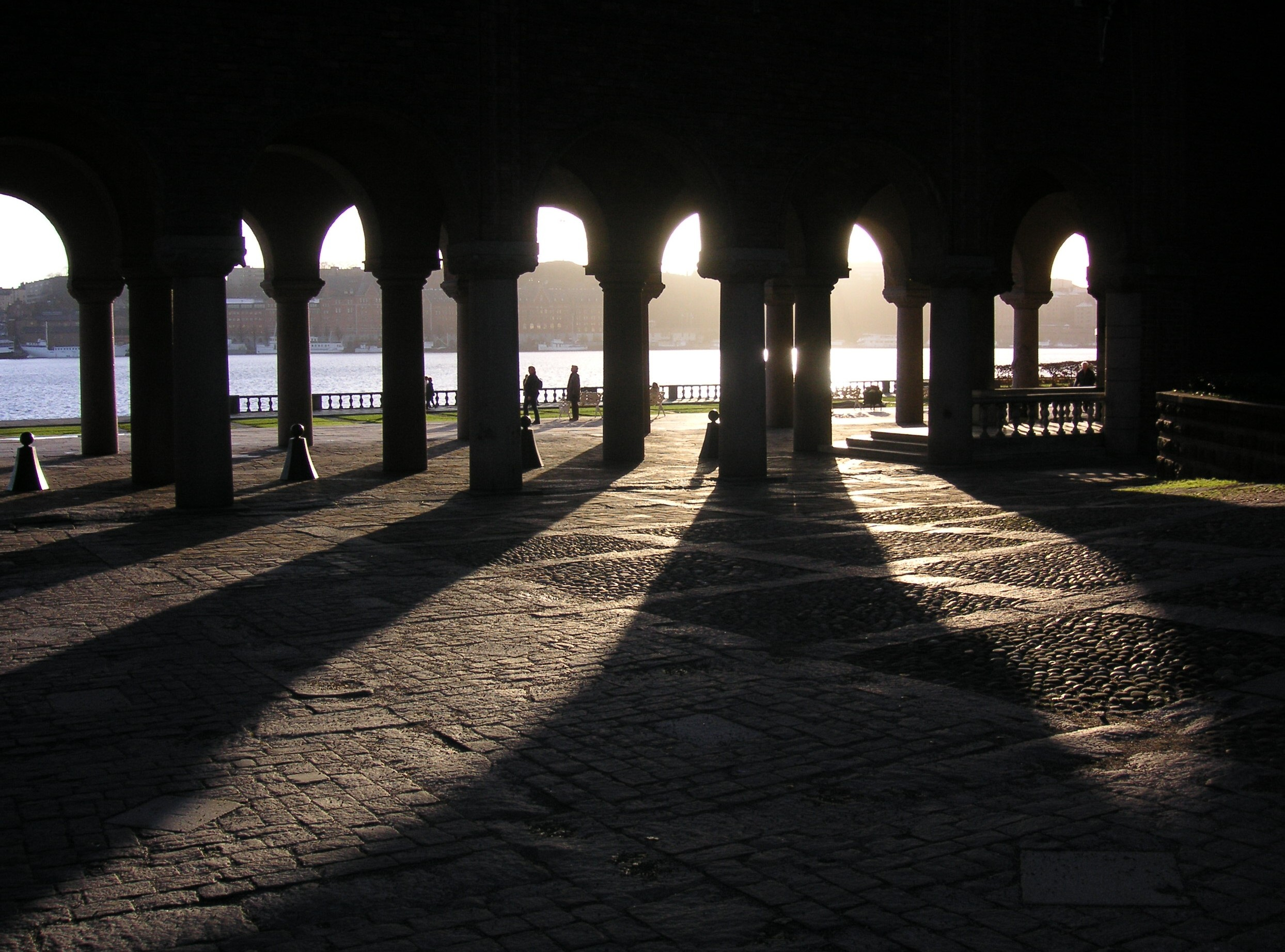
Stockholm City Hall, inneryard

Inner courtyard of Stockholm City Hall

"Blå hallen" (Blue Hall)

"Rådsalen" (Red Room)

The ceiling of the Red Room

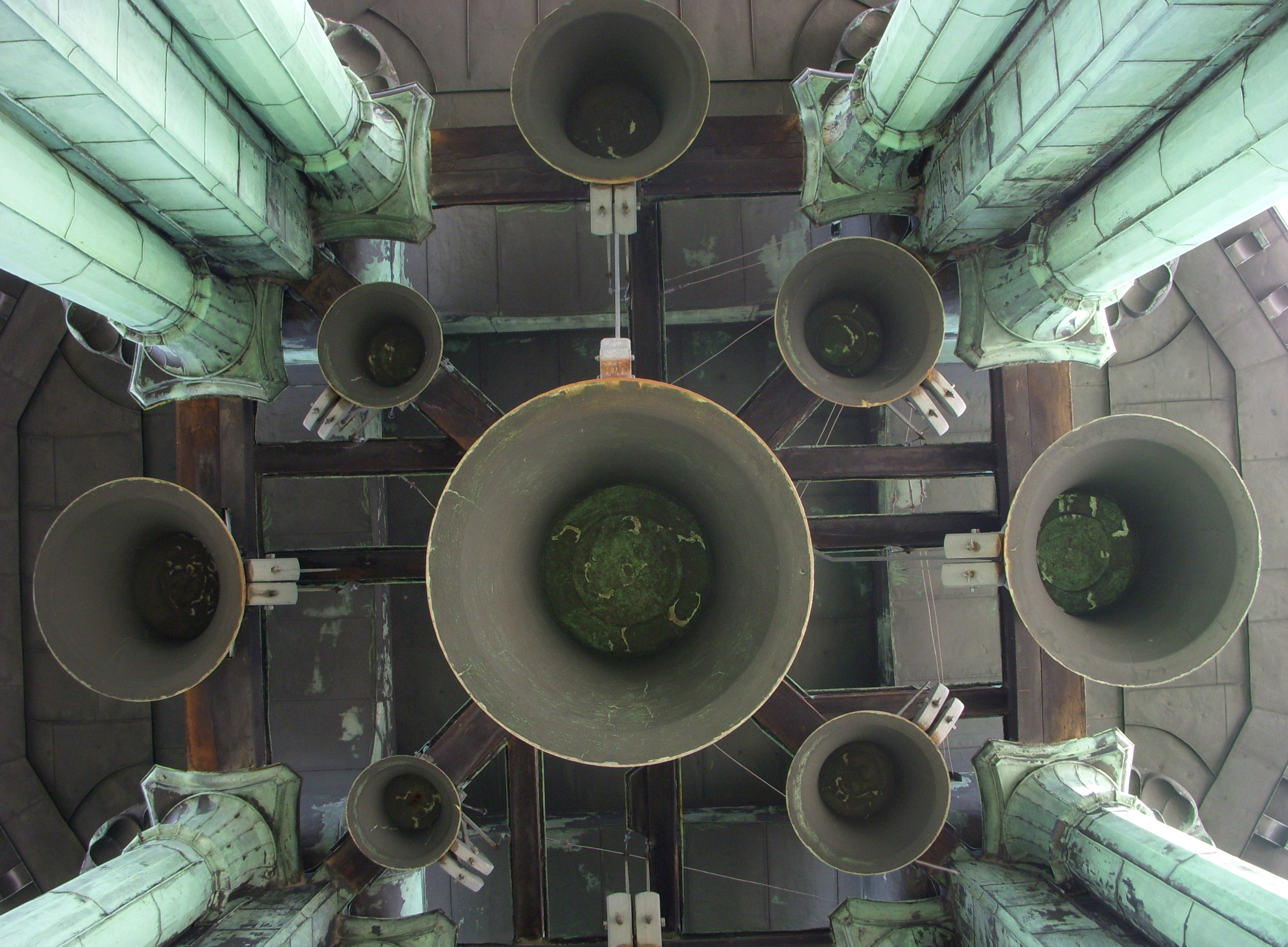
The bells

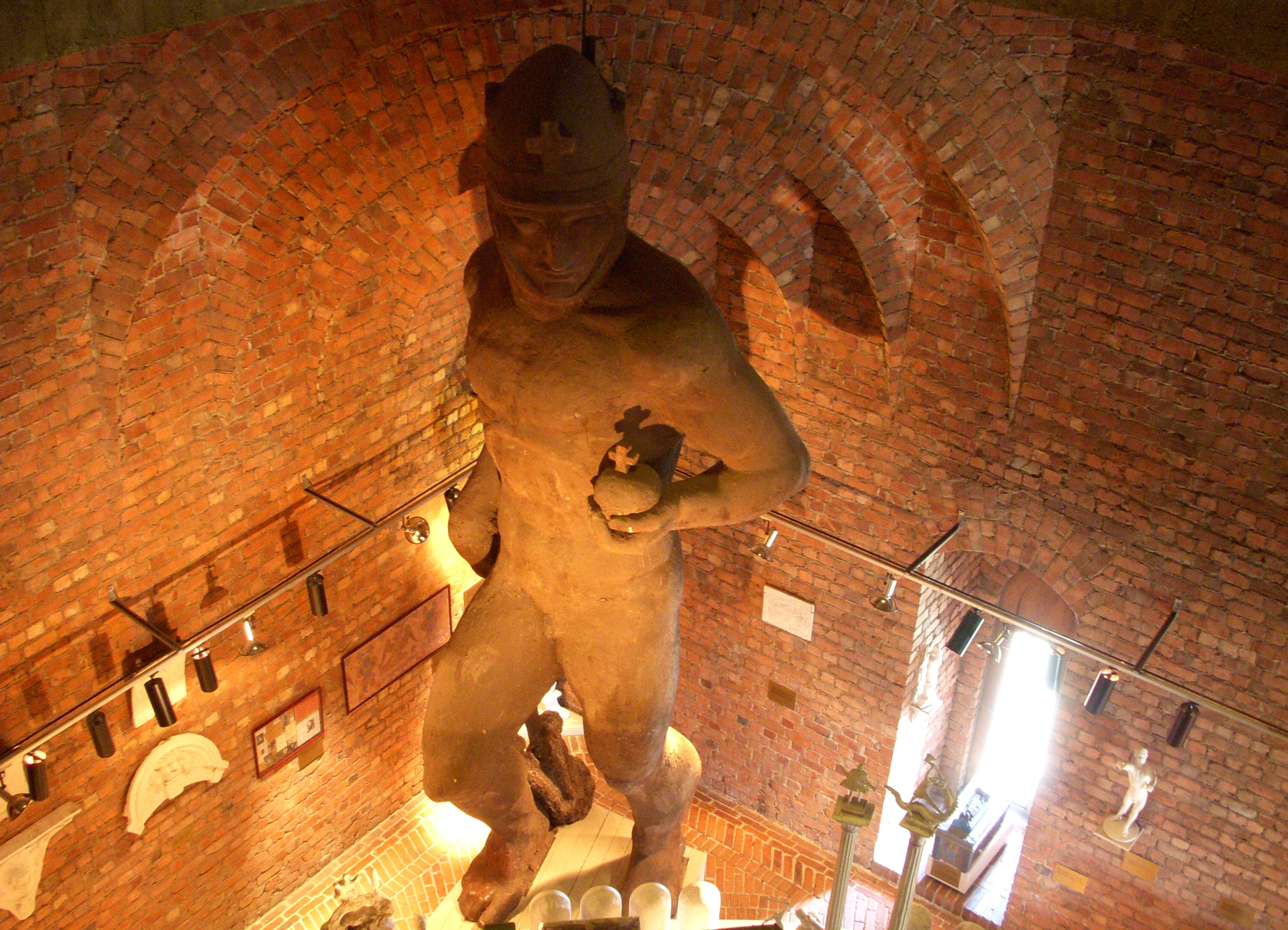
Sankt Erik in tower museum

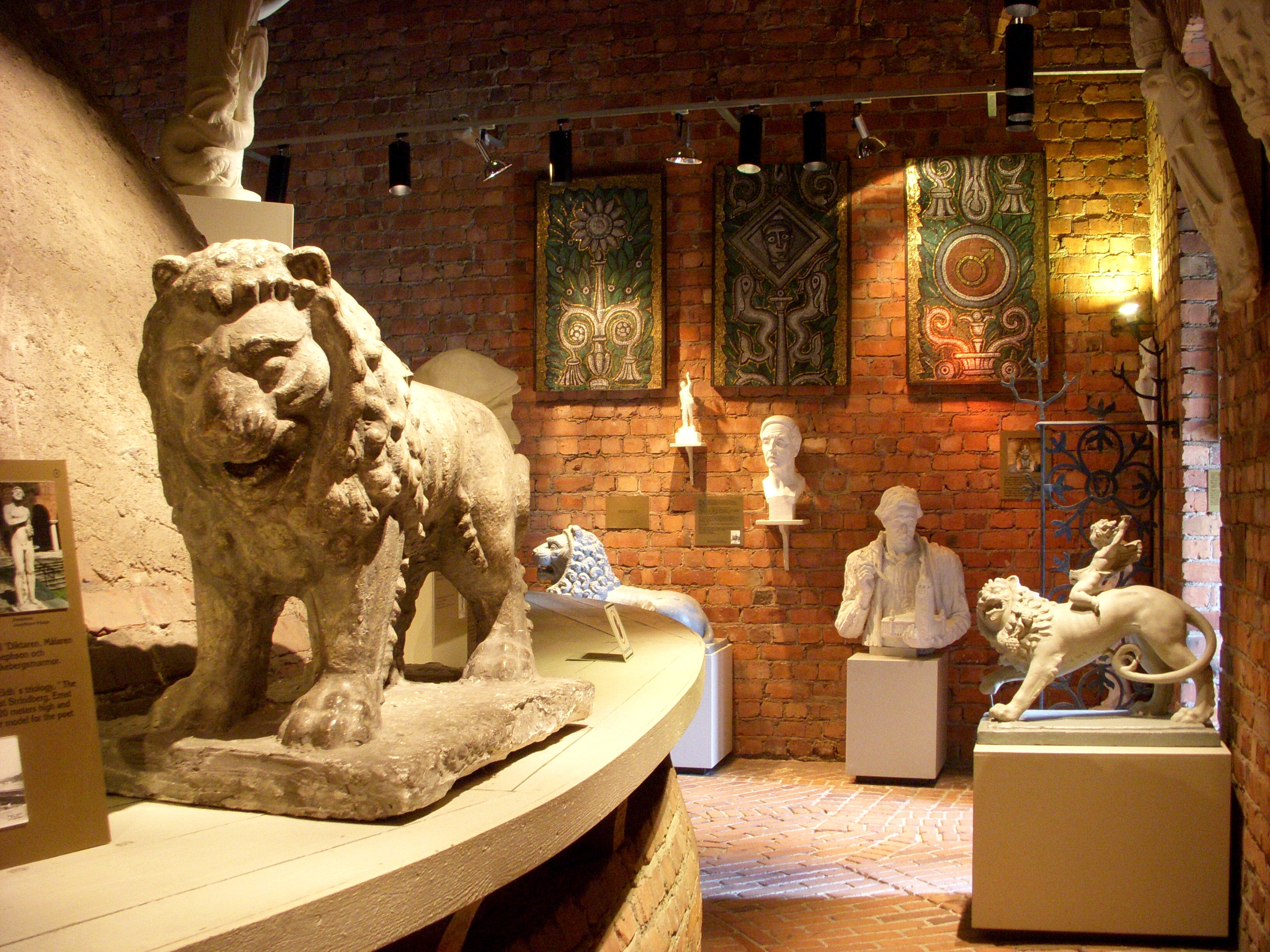
The towermuseum

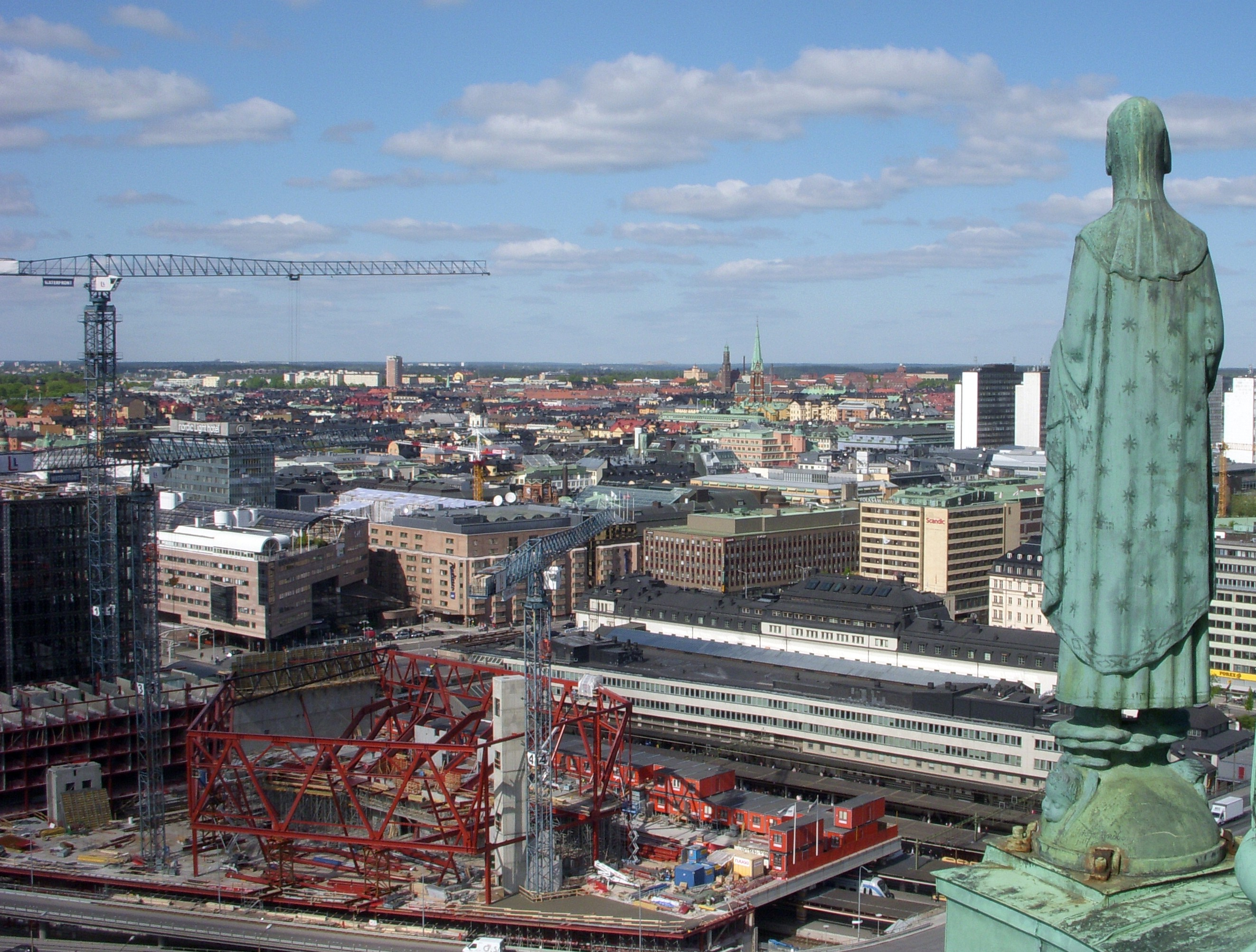
View to north-east

Stockholm City Hall on a summer evening.

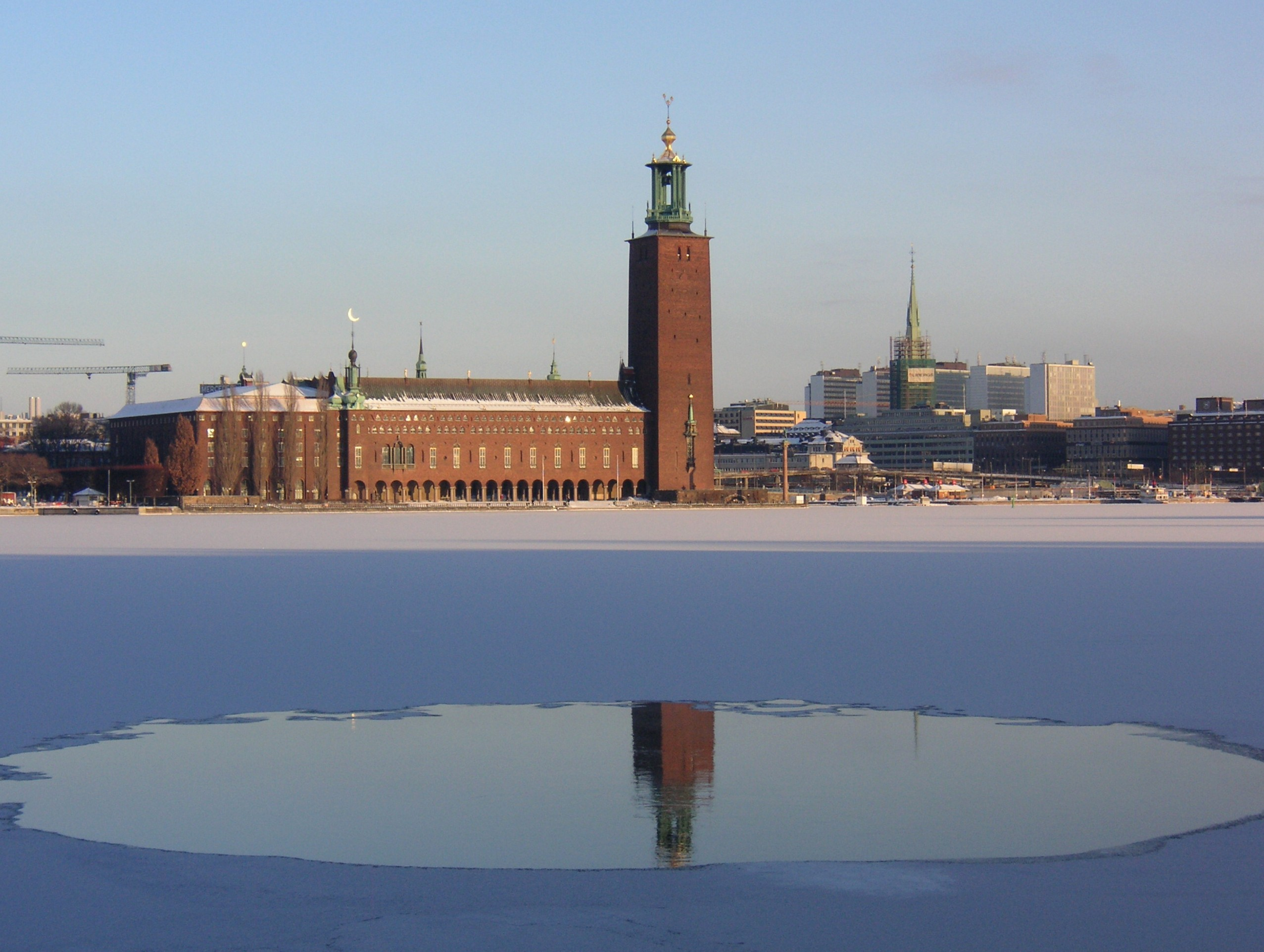
Stockholm City Hall on a winter day.

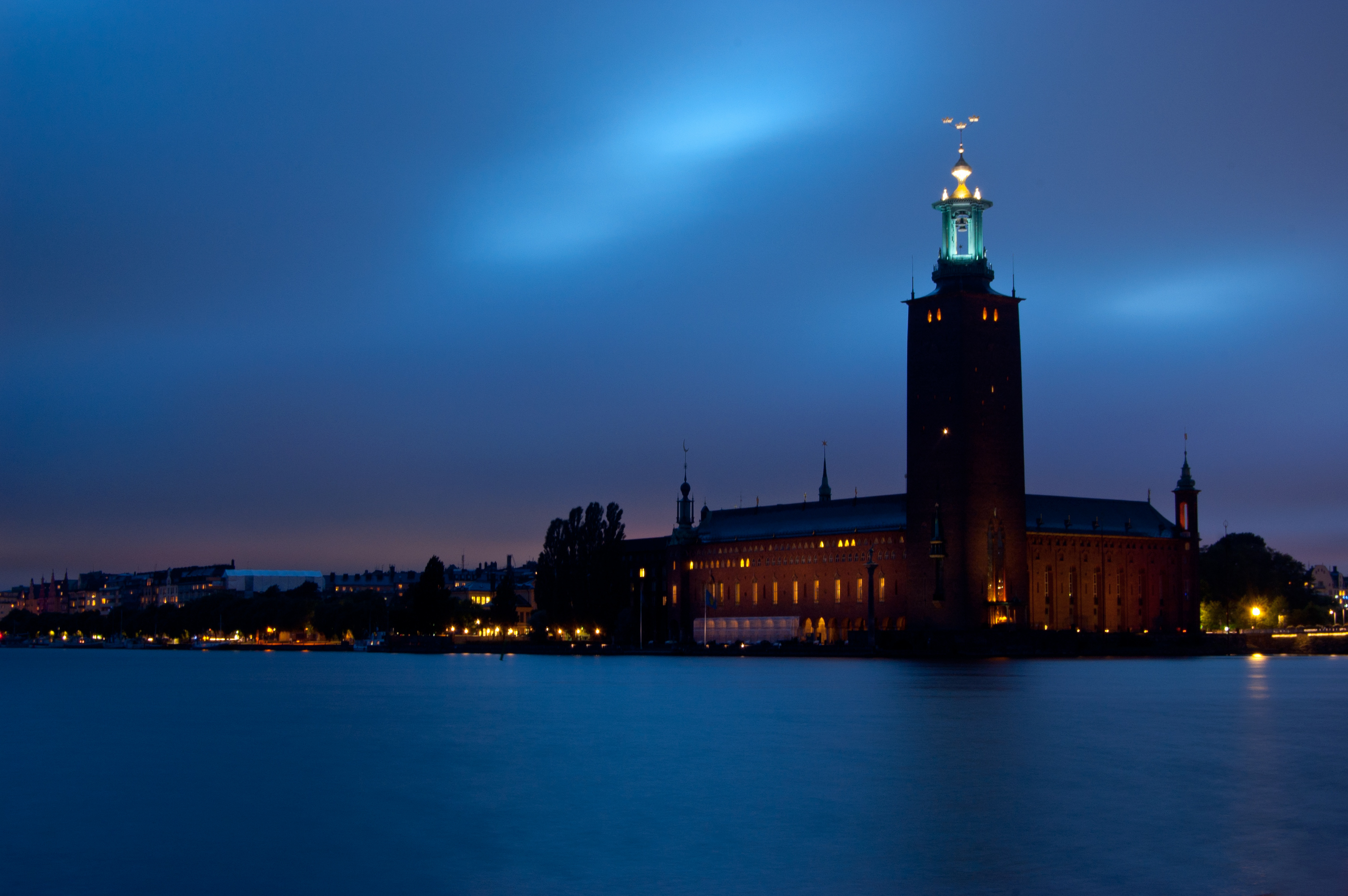
Stockholm City Hall at dusk

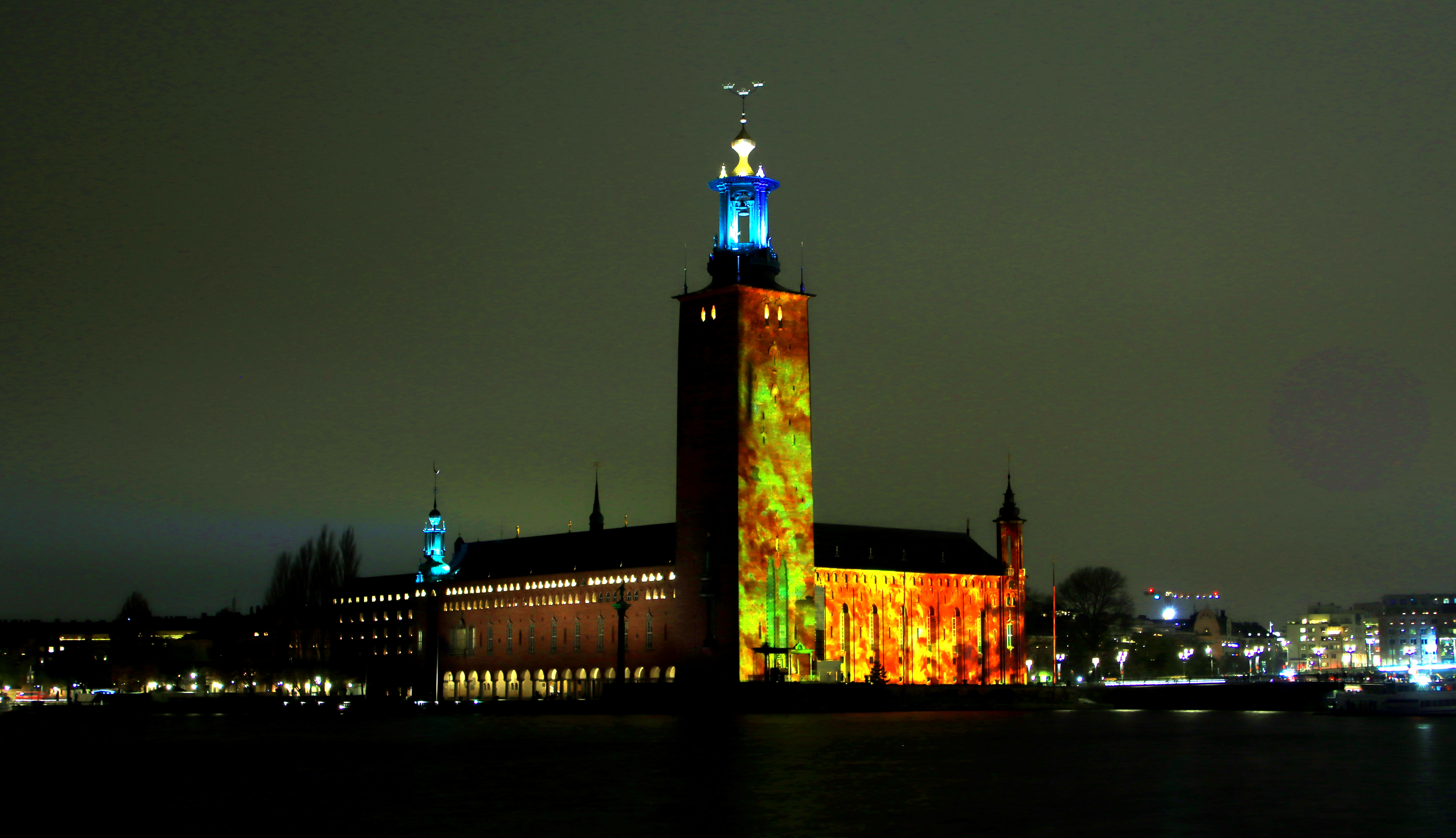
Stockholm City Hall lit up in a 2020 art project during Nobel Week

== See also ==
- Architecture of Stockholm
- History of Stockholm
- List of streets and squares in Gamla stan
- Geography of Stockholm
- Stockholm Court House
