= Emil Westman =

Swedish-Danish artist

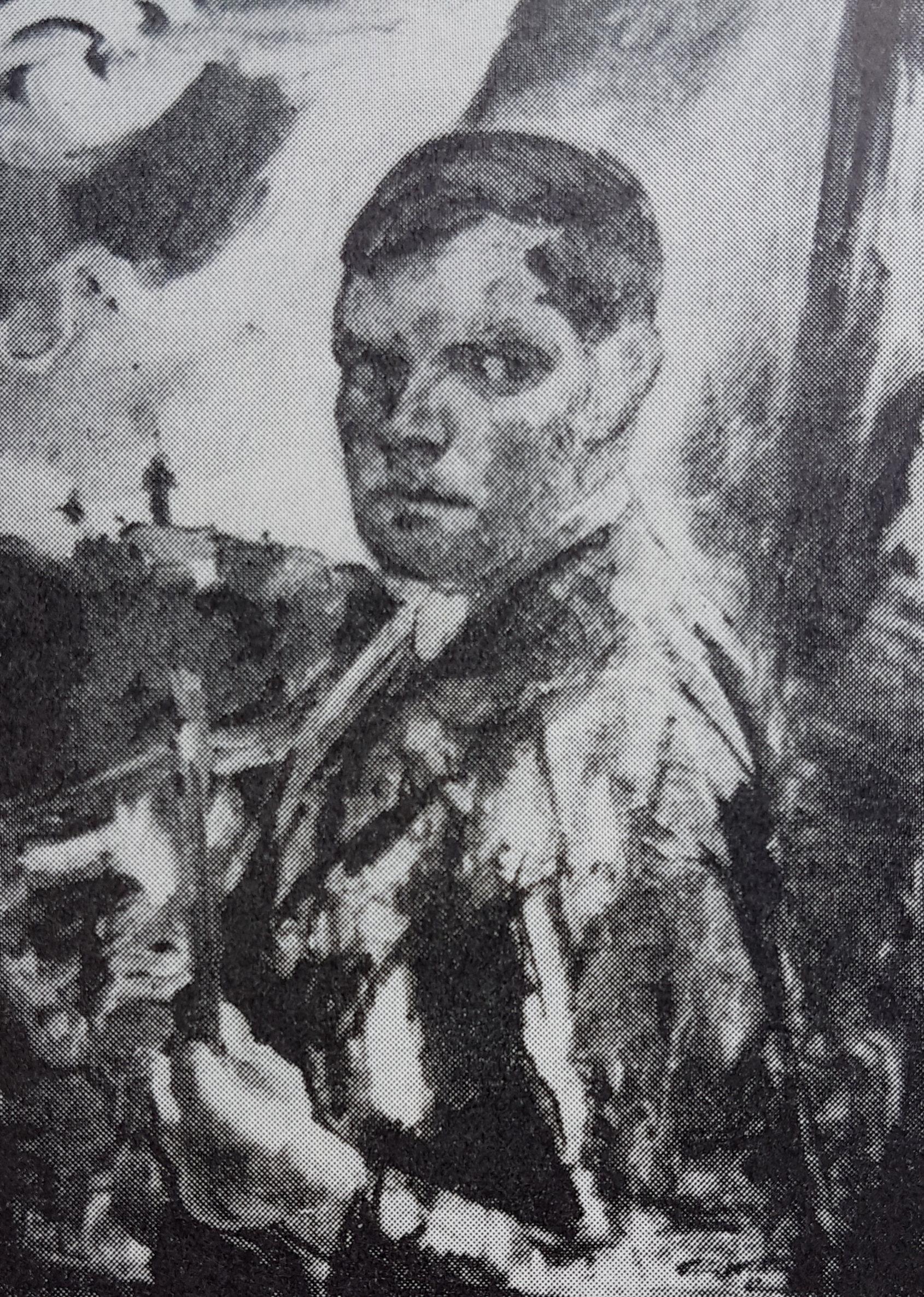
- Self-portrait 1929
- Born: 13 March 1894; Stockholm, Sweden
- Died: 19 June 1935 (aged 41); Copenhagen, Denmark
- Occupation: Artist
- Family: Gunnar Westman (son)

Emil Westman (b. 13 March 1894, Stockholm, Sweden; d. 19 June 1935, Copenhagen, Denmark) was a Swedish-Danish artist.

Westman studied at Herlufsholm School and the Royal Institute of Art in Stockholm. He moved to Copenhagen in 1913 and became a Danish citizen in the same year and was taught by Kristian Zahrtmann. His artwork was exhibited at a solo exhibition in Copenhagen and Svendborg in 1922. He was one of the founding members of the Swedish-Danish art school Koloristerne in 1931.

Some of his work is held at the British Museum in London.

He was the father of Gunnar Westman.
