= Stockholm District Court =

- Stockholms tingsrätt
- Coat of arms.

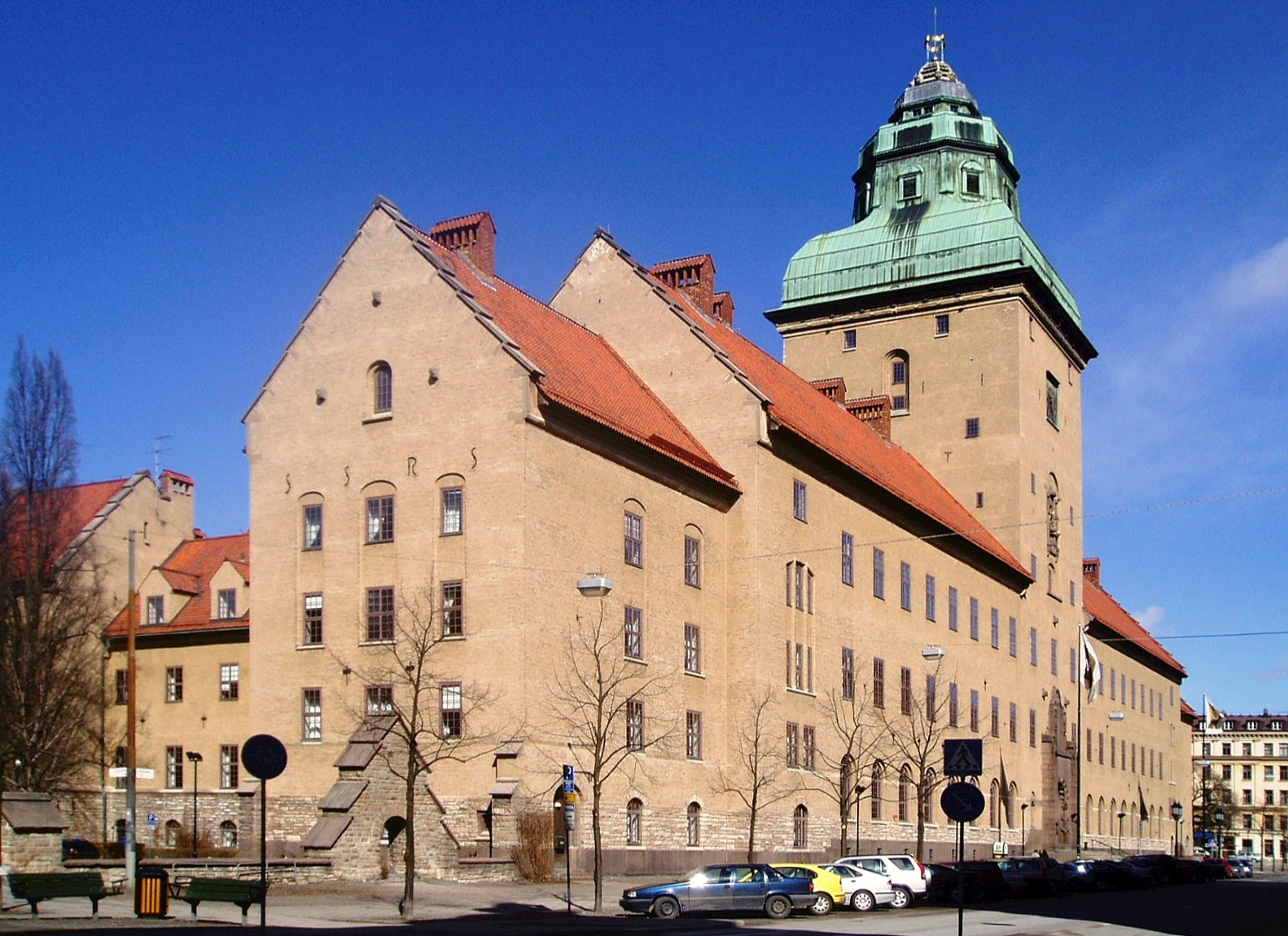
- Stockholm Court House where Stockholm District Court is located.
- 59°19′51″N 18°2′37″E
- Established: 1971
- Location: Stockholm
- Coordinates: 59°19′51″N 18°2′37″E
- Appeals to: Svea Court of Appeal
- Website: www.stockholmstingsratt.se

Chief Judge
- Currently: Göran Lundahl
- Since: 2024

Stockholm District Court (Swedish: Stockholms tingsrätt) is a Swedish district court in Stockholm. Stockholm District Court is Sweden's largest public court and is located in Stockholm Court House on Kungsholmen in Stockholm.

== History ==
The Stockholm District Court was established in Stockholm through the district court reform of 1971 and thereby replaced Stockholm City Court. The judicial district was formed by the Stockholm City Court's judicial district, that is, the City of Stockholm, which in 1971 was transformed with unchanged scope to Stockholm Municipality. The district court took over the Stockholm City Court's premises in Stockholm Court House.

On 1 April 2007 the district court's judicial districts (domsaga), was divided into three parts, in which the part Söderort was moved over to Södertörns domsaga and Västerort moved over to Solna domsaga. Simultaneously Lidingö Municipality was added to the judicial district from the dissolved Södra Roslags domsaga. After this change the district court's judicial district consists of Lidingö Municipality and the Stockholm City Centre.

== Jurisdiction ==
The district courts jurisdiction covers the parishes Stockholms domkyrkoförsamling, Adolf Fredrik, Engelbrekt, Gustav Vasa, Hedvig Eleonora, Högalid, Katarina, Maria Magdalena, Oscar, S:t Johannes, S:t Matteus, Sofia and Västermalm as well as Lidingö Municipality.

== Operation ==
The district court has about 250 employees and 375 lay judges. Head of the court is Chief Judges Gudrun Antemar. The district court handles about 18,000 civil cases, criminal cases and cases per year and consists of five judicial departments. All departments are dealing with general criminal and civil cases and has a high degree of specialization.

== Chief judges ==
Chief Judges of Stockholm District Court:

- 1971–1971: Georg Ericsson
- 1972–1973: Per-Erik Fürst
- 1973–1976: Henry Montgomery
- 1977–1995: Carl-Anton Spak
- 1995–2010: Lena Berke
- 2010–2013: Anders Eka
- 2014–2017: Stefan Strömberg
- 2017–2024: Gudrun Antemar
- 2024–present: Göran Lundahl

== See also ==
- District courts of Sweden
