= Westermann =

Westermann is a surname meaning "man from the West". Notable people with the surname include:

- Anton Westermann (1806-1869), German philologist
- Antoine Westermann (born 1946), French chef
- Bernt Wilhelm Westermann (1781–1868), Danish businessman and entomologist
- Christine Westermann (born 1948), radio and TV host
- Claus Westermann (1909–2000), German Protestant theologian
- Diedrich Westermann (1875–1956), German missionary, ethnographer and African linguist
- François Joseph Westermann (1751–1794), Alsace-born French general and political figure of the French Revolution
- George Westermann (1810–1879), German publisher
- Gerhard Westermann (1880–1971), Dutch artist
- H. C. Westermann (1922–1981), American sculptor
- Hans Westermann (1890–1935), German communist politician (KPD) and member of the resistance
- Heiko Westermann (born 1983), German football player
- Léo Westermann (born 1992), French basketball player
- Liesel Westermann (born 1944), German athlete
- William Linn Westermann (1873–1954), American historian

== See also ==
- Westermann (disambiguation)
- Westerman
- Westman (disambiguation)
- Vestermans
