= Stockholm Court House =

Coordinates: 59°19′51″N 18°2′37″E

Stockholm Court House Stockholms rådhus
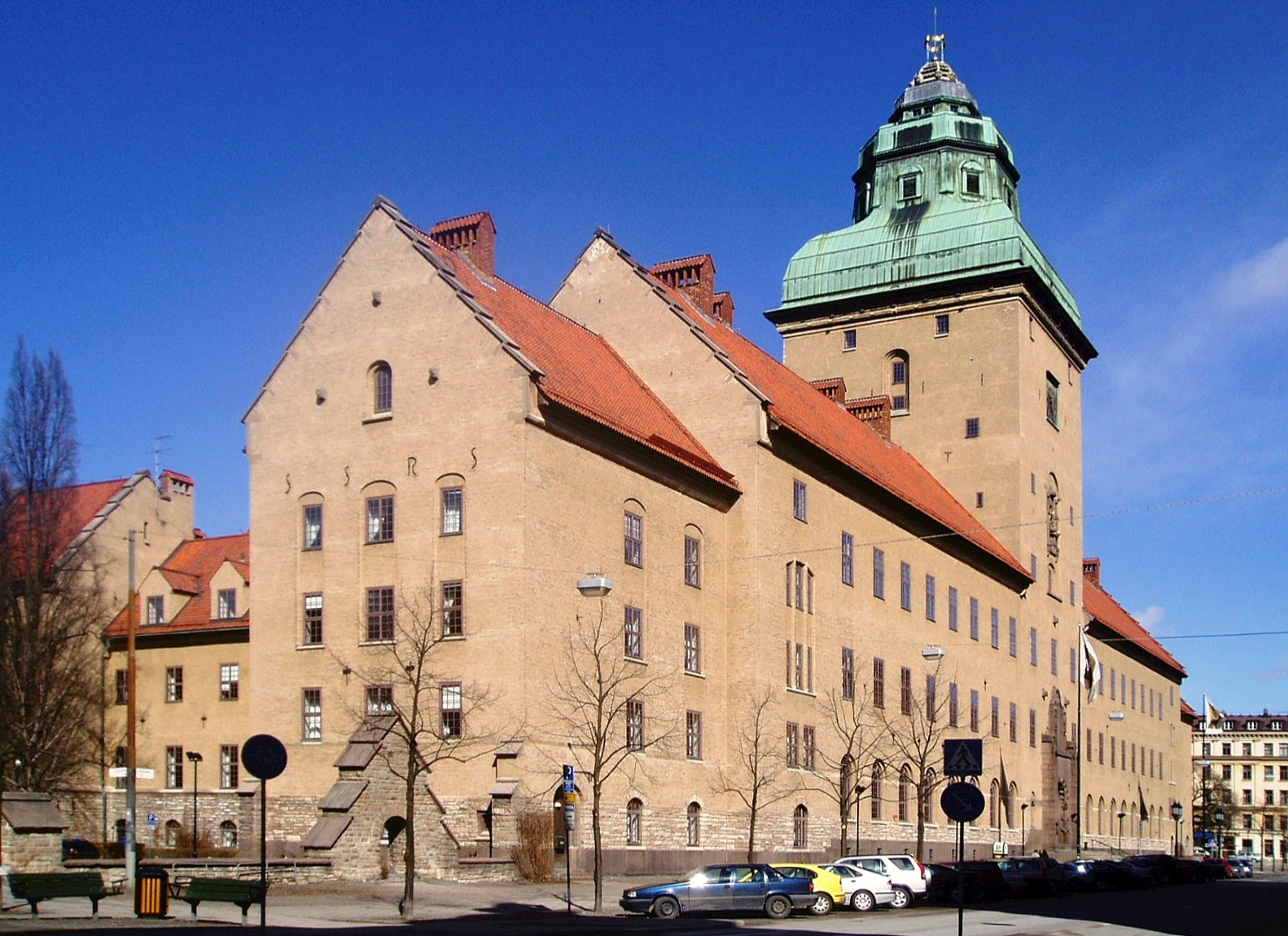
- Interactive map of the Stockholm Court House; Stockholms rådhus area

General information
- Architectural style: National Romantic
- Location: Stockholm, Sweden
- Construction started: 1909
- Completed: 1915
- Client: The City of Stockholm

Design and construction
- Architect: Carl Westman

The Stockholm Court House (Swedish: Stockholms rådhus) is situated on Kungsholmen in Central Stockholm, Sweden. The building is connected to the Stockholm Police House through an underground pedestrian walkway. The Stockholm City Court was situated in the building from 1915 to 1971 and Stockholm District Court from 1971.

The building was designed in the National Romantic style, and was constructed between 1909 and 1915. The architecture was influenced by the Castles of the Vasa era, and it bears a resemblance to Vadstena Castle.

A fire ravaged the third floor of the south/left wing of the building in June 2008.

== See also ==
- Architecture of Stockholm
- Historical fires of Stockholm
