= Torsten Westman =

Swedish architect (1920–2012)

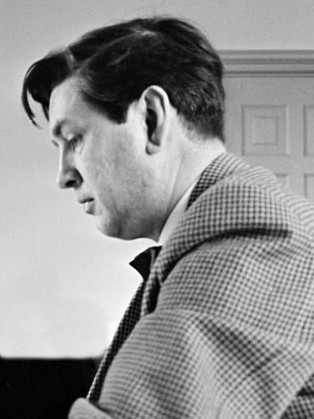
- Born: 7 February 1920; Karlstad, Sweden
- Died: 30 May 2012 (aged 92); Stockholm, Sweden
- Education: Enskilda Gymnasiet; KTH Royal Institute of Technology
- Occupation: Architect

Torsten Gideon Westman (7 February 1920 – 30 May 2012) was a Swedish architect.

Westman attended Enskilda Gymnast and graduated from the KTH Royal Institute of Technology in 1945. He acted as chief architect at Stockholm's city planning office between 1973 and 1985 and was involved in several controversial construction works.

He entered municipal service quite early as an architect and later as chief architect at Stockholm's city planning office. In this position, he became involved in the continued Norrmalm regulation, whose first stage with Hötorgscity and Sergels torg was completed in 1966.

The 1962 city plan was the basis for the continued work south of Sergels torg. Torsten Westman, together with Anders Nordberg and Åke Hedtjärn, was the mastermind behind this city plan. Popularly they were called the "troika", or the "iron gang". As early as 1954, Westman had in a writing presented his ideas about Sveaplatsen (later Sergels torg) with pedestrian traffic on a lower level and driving traffic on an upper level. City 62 was discussed and criticized in detail in the beginning of 1963, Torsten Westman was the official behind the city plan who was closest to the plan emotionally and intellectually.
