= Westerman =

Westerman is a surname. Notable people with the surname include:

- Alan Westerman (1913–2001), senior Australian public servant
- Alex Westerman (born 1969), American creative director
- Bruce Westerman (born 1967), U.S. representative for Arkansas' 4th congressional district
- Chantal Westerman, American actress and television correspondent
- Floyd "Red Crow" Westerman (1936–2007), Lakota musician, songwriter, and actor
- Gerardus Frederik Westerman (1807–1890), Dutch publisher and naturalist
- Gwen Westerman, Dakota educator, writer, and artist
- Joe Westerman (born 1989), English rugby league footballer
- John F. C. Westerman (1901–1991), English children's author
- Harold Westerman (1917–2011), American college football and basketball coach
- Helen Westerman (1926–2006), American baseball player
- Percy F. Westerman (1876–1959), English children's author
- Sian Westerman (born 1962), British banker and fashion industry supporter
- Tom Westerman Wolf (born 1948), governor of Pennsylvania
- Tracy Westerman (born 1970), Indigenous Australian psychologist and writer

== See also ==
- Westerman (musician)
- Westerman, West Virginia
- Westermann
