= Gunnar Westman =

Danish sculptor (1915–1985)

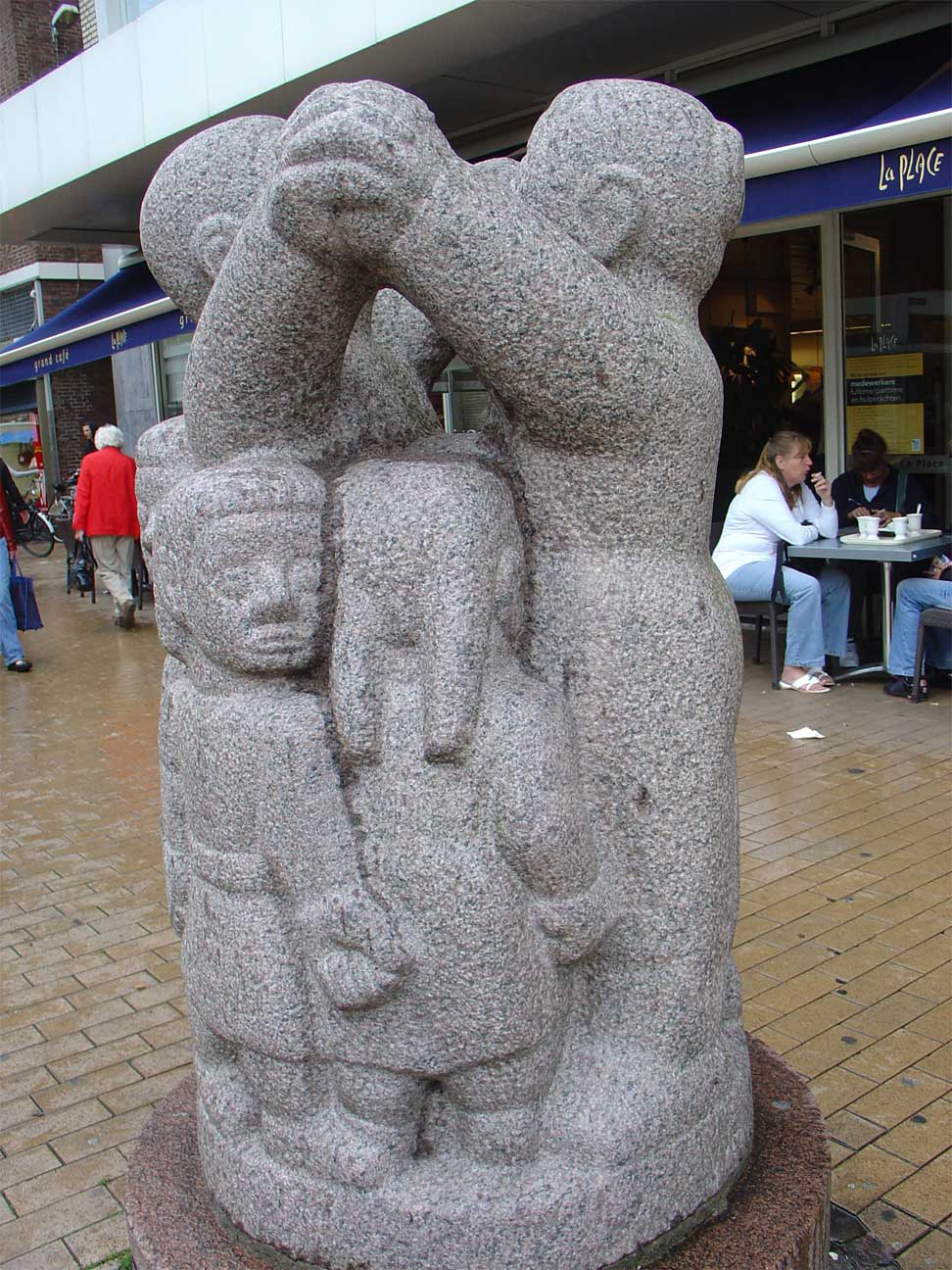
Gunnar Westman: Bro Bro Brille (1958) in Groningen

Gunnar Millet Westman (11 February 1915 – 11 April 1985) was a Danish sculptor who developed a simple, stylised approach, often crafting figures of children.

== Early life ==
Son of the artist Emil Gustaf Westman who established the painters association Koloristerne, Gunnar Westman grew up in an artistic milieu. Westman was educated at Herlufsholm School and first trained as a silversmith at A. Dragsted, a goldsmiths concern, before studying sculpture at the Danish Academy (1938–42) under Einar Utzon-Frank. He was however deeply influenced by his early travels to Sweden where he worked as a silversmith. In particular, he was struck by the wooden figures of Axel Petersson Döderhultarn and later by the work of Bror Hjorth.

== Career ==
Westman's early work from the end of the 1930s was strongly influenced by the folkloric Swedish style as can be seen in Fløjlespilleren (1937) and Sygebesøget (1939). Over the years, his Naturalistic approach evolved into a simpler, more stylised form, often in polychromatic ceramics. His simplified crafting can be seen in works representing children such as Børn ved vinduet (Children at the Window, 1947), and Gøgeungen and Børnehaven (1948). Works on display include Kalkun (Turkey, 1960), Orm og Tyr (Worm and Bull, 1963) and Sneugle (Snowy Owl, 1968). He was a member of the Grønningen artists association from 1946 to 1965 and of Corner from 1966 to 1985.

== Awards ==
Westman received the Eckersberg Medal in 1967 and the Thorvaldsen Medal in 1975.

== Bibliography ==
- Dansk Skulptur i 125 år, Copenhagen, Gyldendal, 1996. (da icon). ISBN 87-00-24612-3
