= Carl Westman =

Swedish architect and interior designer (1866–1936)

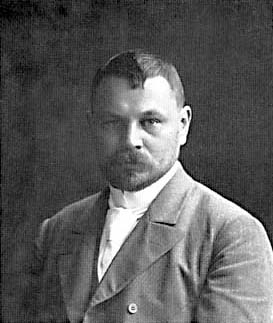
Carl Westman

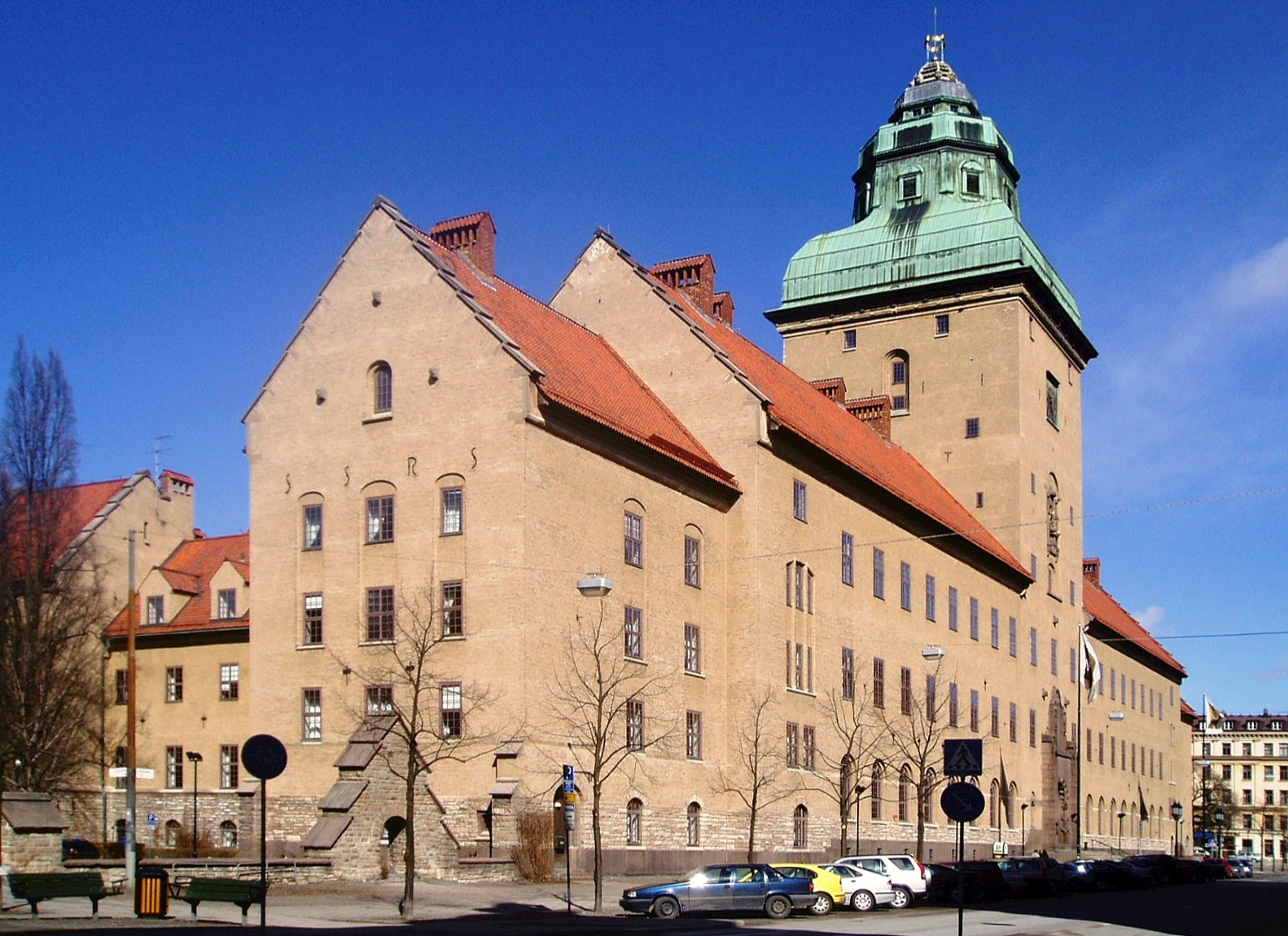
Stockholm Court House

Ernst Carl Westman (20 February 1866 – 23 January 1936) was a Swedish architect and interior designer. He was an early adopter of the National Romantic Style, but turned later to the neo-classical style of the 1920s.

== Biography ==
Carl Westman was born in Uppsala in 1866. He studied at the Royal Institute of Technology in 1885-1889, and then at the Royal Swedish Academy of Arts in 1889–1892, in Stockholm. In 1893, he married artist Elin Andersson and moved to the United States where he practiced with architect R. L. Daus in New York City from 1893–1895.

In 1895, he returned to Stockholm to work for architect Aron Johansson (who at that time was the architect working with the new Parliament House (1895–1904) in Stockholm). In 1897, Westman opened his own architect bureau. He became a member of the Royal Swedish Academy of Arts in 1912 and in 1916 he became the chief architect of the National Swedish Board of Health.

Carl Westman was one of the foremost advocates in Sweden for a return to the national characteristics in architecture. He was one of the first Swedish architects who developed the new Nordic National Romantic Style, a style which took the cultural and building precedents and merged them with ideas from the English Arts and Crafts movement to create a very distinct Swedish architecture often in brick and wood.

Carl Westman's Swedish General Medical Association building in Stockholm (1904-1906) was the first building built in the National Romantic Style, with the Röhss Museum in Gothenburg (1910–1914) and Stockholm Court House (1911–1915), providing another two prominent examples. The Stockholm Court House has striking similarities with the medieval Vadstena Castle, and provides a dazzling sight in downtown Stockholm, though the building proves quite inflexible for its purposes.

Later on, Westman worked particularly as a hospital architect, gradually adopting the classical style of the 1920s, with noted examples being the Beckomberga Hospital (1927–1935), and the Karolinska Hospital (1935–1940) which was completed after his death. Whereas the psychiatric hospital at Beckomberga was strictly symmetrically planned, with massive buildings grouped in a fairly functional pattern, the Karolinska hospital strives towards a more functional architecture where the symmetrical design was toned down.

Carl Westman was also a part-time interior designer of furniture and utility supplies such as tiled stoves. He died in Stockholm in 1936.
