= List of design awards =

This list of design awards is an index to articles about notable awards given for design. It excludes architecture, fashion and motor vehicle design, but includes industrial design.

== Americas ==
Country	Award	Sponsor	Notes
United States	Superior Design Award		The Superior Design Award (SDA) unites designers from around the world on a global platform that celebrates creativity and innovation in USA November, since 2024.
Canada	Award for Excellence in Book Design	Alcuin Society	Excellence in book design
Canada	Graphex	Society of Graphic Designers of Canada	Best examples of visual communication design
United States	AI Design Award	AIDA	Recognizing groundbreaking work in AI and design integration.
United States	Good Design Award	Museum of Modern Art	Good Design (from 1950 to 1955)
United States	Graphis International Design Awards	Graphis Inc.	Honoring creative excellence in Graphic Design and visual communications since 1944
United States	Graphis International New Talent Awards	Graphis Inc.	Honoring creative excellence of university students in design, advertising, photography, product design, and illustration art
United States	Communication Arts Award of Excellence	Communication Arts	Honoring creativity in design, advertising, photography, typography, illustration and interactive media
United States	Miller Prize	Exhibit Columbus	Exploration of architecture, art, design, and community
United States	Cased	American Institute of Graphic Arts	Celebrating the best in contemporary design through case studies
United States	Type Design Awards	Type Directors Club	Excellence in typeface design
United States	Leading Edge Award	World Waterpark Association	development of new themes in the water attractions industry
United States	American Prize for Design	Chicago Athenaeum	Distinguished designer in the fields of industrial design, visual communication and graphic design
United States	Andrea M. Bronfman Prize for the Arts	Charles Bronfman	Israeli decorative artist working in ceramics, glass, textiles or jewellery
United States	Apple Design Awards	Apple Inc.	Best and most innovative Macintosh and iOS software and hardware produced by independent developers
United States	Art Directors Club Hall of Fame	Art Directors Club of New York	Significant contributions to art direction and visual communications
United States	Chrysler Design Award	Chrysler	Achievements of individuals in innovative works of architecture and design which significantly influenced modern American culture
United States	Coin of the Year Award	Krause Publications	Numismatic design, artistic vision and craftsmanship
United States	Curry Stone Design Prize	Curry Stone Foundation	Innovative excellence in humanitarian design
United States	Design Icon Award	World Market Center Las Vegas	Interior or furniture designer who has made a significant contribution to the industry
United States	Edison Award	Edison Awards	Honoring excellence in innovation
United States	Frederic W. Goudy Award	Rochester Institute of Technology	Outstanding practitioner in the field of typography
United States	Good Design Award	Chicago Athenaeum	various categories
United States	Housewares Design Awards	HomeWorld Business	Recognize design innovation as one of the major drivers for housewares industry growth
United States	International Design Awards	Farmani Group	Visionaries and emerging talent in architecture, interior, product, graphic and fashion design
United States	International Design Excellence Awards	Industrial Designers Society of America	Fostering business and public understanding of the importance of industrial design excellence to the quality of life and economy
United States	L Prize	United States Department of Energy	Spur lighting manufacturers to develop high-quality, high-efficiency solid-state lighting products to replace the common incandescent light bulb
United States	National Design Awards	Cooper Hewitt, Smithsonian Design Museum	Recognizing design in USA to educate and promote excellence, innovation, and lasting achievement
United States	Phil Kaufman Award	Electronic System Design Alliance	Recognize individuals for their impact on electronic design by their contributions to electronic design automation (EDA)
United States	The Earth Awards	Earth Awards	Global search for creative solutions designed for the 21st century
United States	Transform Awards North America	Transform magazine	Celebrating the transformative power of brand design and brand strategy. Held annually in New York in November, since 2015.

== Asia and Oceania ==
Country	Award	Sponsor	Notes
Australia	Australian Good Design Awards	Industrial Design Council of Australia	National design awards for industrial design (established 1958)
Australia	Greenpeace Design Awards	Greenpeace Australia Pacific	Innovative and creative individuals whose work best reflects environmental concerns in a visually striking and iconic way
Australia	Australian Furniture Design Award	The National Gallery of Victoria and Stylecraft	The award is part of Melbourne Design Week. The Award celebrates the most interesting furniture and lighting design being created in Australia today, with a particular emphasis on new design ideas, critical and creative thinking, sustainability, material development and research that explores innovative production processes.
Australia	Clarence Prize for Furniture Design	Clarence City Council, Rosny Farm Arts Centre, Hobart Tasmania	The Clarence Prize is a biennial exhibition that has found its niche within Australia’s art community celebrating innovative furniture design.
India	NCPEDP MphasiS Universal Design Awards	National Centre for Promotion of Employment for Disabled People / Mphasis	Individuals and organisations doing exemplary work towards the cause of accessibility and thus ensuring a life of equality and dignity for persons with disabilities
Japan	Good Design Award	Japan Institute of Design Promotion	Product that can bless and enrich society and people's lives through its design
Japan	Kyoto Global Design Award	Kyoto Global Design Awards	8 categories: BEST 100, Environment, Industrial, Visual, Trend, Theory, Real Estate, Restaurant/ Hotel/ Bar Design
Japan	Mainichi Design Prize	Mainichi Shimbun	Outstanding Japanese designers (since 1952)
Singapore	Singapore Jewellery Design Award	Singapore Jewellery association	Competition among art school students
Singapore	Singapore Good Design Award	Design Business Chamber Singapore	Design Business Chamber Singapore (DBCS) launched Singapore Good Design (SG Mark) in 2013 in partnership with the Japan Institute of Design Promotion (JDP) that founded the prestigious Good Design Award (G Mark).
South Korea	Good Design Korea	Ministry of Trade Industry and Energy / Korea Institute of Design Promotion	Korea Institute of Design Promotion is in accordance with the Industrial Design Promotion Act. It has been implemented every year since 1985.
South Korea	Korea International Design Award	Ministry of Trade Industry and Energy / Korea Institute of Design Promotion	The Korea Design Exhibition is the most prestigious design award in Korea. (since 1966)
South Korea	Korea International Design Award(Youth)	Ministry of Trade Industry and Energy / Korea Institute of Design Promotion	The Korea Design Exhibition(Youth) is the most prestigious design award in Korea. (since 1966)
Taiwan	Golden Pin Design Award	Taiwan Design Research Institute	Established in Taiwan in 1981, originally named the "Taiwan Excellent Design Award". Renamed as the "Golden Pin Design Award" in 2009.
Taiwan	Taiwan Excellence Awards	Ministry of Economic Affairs (Taiwan) / Taiwan External Trade Development Council	The Taiwan Excellence Awards are to encourage Taiwan industries to upgrade and incorporate innovation and value into their products.

== Europe ==
Country	Award	Sponsor	Notes
Europe	Design Management Europe Award	Design Management Europe	Management and successful implementation of design in processes and strategies to achieve business goals
Europe	European Design Award	15 Magazines	Outstanding work in the communication design field
Denmark	Danish Design Award	Danish Design Centre	All design disciplines, with focus on form, function and value creation
Denmark	Finn Juhl Prize	Wilhelm Hansen Foundation	Special effort in the field of furniture design–with special reference to chairs
Denmark	The Index Project	The Index Project	Improvement of life worldwide, both in developed and developing countries
Finland	Kaj Franck Prize	Design Forum Finland	Finnish design
Finland	Fennia Prize	Design Forum Finland, Fennia Group	Good design grows global competition
France	Observeur du Design	Agence pour la promotion de la création industrielle	Design as a key factor in business competitiveness as well as economic, social and cultural innovation (from 1999 to 2019)
France	Peugeot Concours Design	Peugeot	Designs for a car (2001 to 2008)
Germany	German Design Award	Federal Ministry for Economic Affairs and Energy	Innovative products and projects, their manufacturers and designers in the German and international design sector
Germany	IF Product Design Award	International Forum Design	Multiple disciplines
Germany	Kind + Jugend Innovation Award	Kind + Jugend trade fair	Best overall baby product in the areas of design, safety, user-friendliness, degree of innovation, and quality of workmanship
Germany	Red Dot	Red Dot GmbH	Product design, brand and communication design as well as design concepts
Greece	EVGE		Awards designers legally residing in Greece, or projects that are designed mainly for the Greek or Cypriot public.
Italy	Compasso d'Oro	Associazione per il Disegno Industriale	Acknowledge and promote quality in the field of industrial designs made in Italy (established 1954)
Italy	Archiproducts Design Awards	Archiproducts	Recognize excellence in product design and innovation across multiple categories, including furniture, lighting, finishes, and building technologies. The awards celebrate creativity, materials research, and aesthetic value, highlighting products that stand out for their originality and contribution to contemporary living.
Italy	A' Design Award	A' Design Award & Competition SRL	Create a global appreciation and understanding of good design in fields of design, art and architecture.
Netherlands	Benno Premsela Prize	Mondriaan Fonds	A person who has played a stimulating role in the field of visual arts, design or architecture (from 2000 to 2012)
Netherlands	Dutch Design Awards	Dutch Design Award Foundation	Honor design initiatives and designers in the Netherlands
Netherlands	Dutch Furniture Awards	Dutch Furniture Awards	Dutch furniture design (from 1985 to 1998)
Netherlands	Gerrit Noordzij Prize	Royal Academy of Art, The Hague	Extraordinary contributions to the fields of type design, typography and type education
Netherlands	Rotterdam Design Award	Rotterdam Design Award	Conceptual vision and performance in the field of the designer (from 1993 to 2013)
Nordic countries	Forum AID Award	Forum AID	Architecture, Interiors, Design and Best Student Work (from 2006 to 2009)
Norway	Visuelt	Grafill	Professionals working with visual communication in Norway (since 1993)
Norway	Årets vakreste Bøker	Grafill	Excellence in Book Design (since 1933)
Poland	Design Educates Awards	Laka Foundation	Awards for architects and designers who educate, provide an informative layer, and added value through their projects.
Scandinavia	Lunning Prize	Frederik Lunning	Eminent Scandinavian designers (from 1951 to 1970)
Spain	IED Design Awards	Istituto Europeo di Design	People and projects that stand out within the design world
Sweden	Excellent Swedish Design	Swedish Society of Crafts and Design	Professional design organizations and their producers (from 1983 to 2002)
Sweden	Torsten and Wanja Söderberg Prize	Röhsska Museum	Active Nordic designer or craftsman (from 1994 to 2018)
Switzerland	Swiss Design Awards	Swiss government's Federal Office of Culture	Open to Swiss designers and to designers resident in Switzerland
Switzerland	Design Prize Switzerland	Design Prize Switzerland Non-profit Organisation	Targeted at professional designers and companies connected to the Swiss design industry, while also being open to international participants and students whose work is relevant to the Swiss market

=== United Kingdom ===
Country	Award	Sponsor	Notes
United Kingdom	Agency Design Awards	World Brand Design Society	Excellence in Craft, Design and Business - Agencies and Studios
United Kingdom	British Inspiration Awards	British Inspiration Awards	Achievement in the creative industries of Britain
United Kingdom	Bicentenary Medal of the Royal Society of Arts	Royal Society of Arts	A person who, in a manner other than as an industrial designer, has applied art and design in great effect as instruments of civic innovation
United Kingdom	Brunel Award	The Watford Group	Visual design in railway architecture, graphics, industrial design and art, etc.
United Kingdom	Creative Design Awards	World Brand Design Society	Excellence in Craft, Design and Business - Freelance Creatives and Freelance Creative Teams
United Kingdom	The Annual		Global design and creative award celebrating range of design disciplines.
United Kingdom	D&AD Awards	D&AD	Excellence in design and advertising
United Kingdom	Craft and design gold medal	National Eisteddfod of Wales	Excellence in Craft and Design
United Kingdom	In-House Design Awards	World Brand Design Society	Excellence in Craft, Design and Business - In-House Design Teams
United Kingdom	ISTD International Typographic Awards	International Society of Typographic Designers	Current standards in typographic design
United Kingdom	James Dyson Award	James Dyson Foundation	Challenges young people to design something that solves a problem
United Kingdom	Kent Design Awards	Kent County Council	Design excellence in Kent
United Kingdom	London Design Medals	London Design Festival	Four London Design Medals awarded yearly (since 2007)
United Kingdom	Loo of the Year Awards	Loo of the Year Awards	Best toilets in Britain, Ireland and the Channel Islands
United Kingdom	Millennium product	Design Council	British products and companies which show "imagination, ingenuity and inspiration" as well as "innovation, creativity and design"
United Kingdom	Phillips Gold Medal	Phillips Gold Medal	Person who has contributed the most to British postage stamp design in recent years
United Kingdom	Prince Philip Designers Prize	Chartered Society of Designers	Design career which has upheld the highest standards and broken new ground
United Kingdom	Pub Design Awards	Campaign for Real Ale	Exceptional pubs in the UK that have been newly built/converted or have recently undergone building/conservation work
United Kingdom	Royal Designers for Industry	Royal Society of Arts	Encourage a high standard of industrial design and enhance the status of designers
United Kingdom	Student Design Awards	World Brand Design Society	Excellence in Craft, Design and Business - In-House Design Teams
United Kingdom	The Sir Misha Black Awards	Design and Industries Association etc.	Individuals and institutions, to honour them in their role within design education
United Kingdom	Wood Awards	Worshipful Company of Carpenters	Working with wood in buildings and furniture (since 1971)

== See also ==
- Lists of awards
- List of architecture awards
- List of fashion awards
