= Hyvönen =

Hyvönen is a Finnish surname. Notable people with the surname include:

- Frida Hyvönen (born 1977), Swedish singer-songwriter
- Juho Hyvönen (1891–1975), Finnish lawyer, civil servant and politician
- Hannes Hyvönen (born 1975), Finnish ice hockey player
- Tapani Hyvönen (born 1947), Finnish industrial designer
- Soili Stenroos (born 1958), Finnish lichenologist and curator (née Hyvönen)
