= Nille Juul-Sørensen =

Danish architect (born 1958)

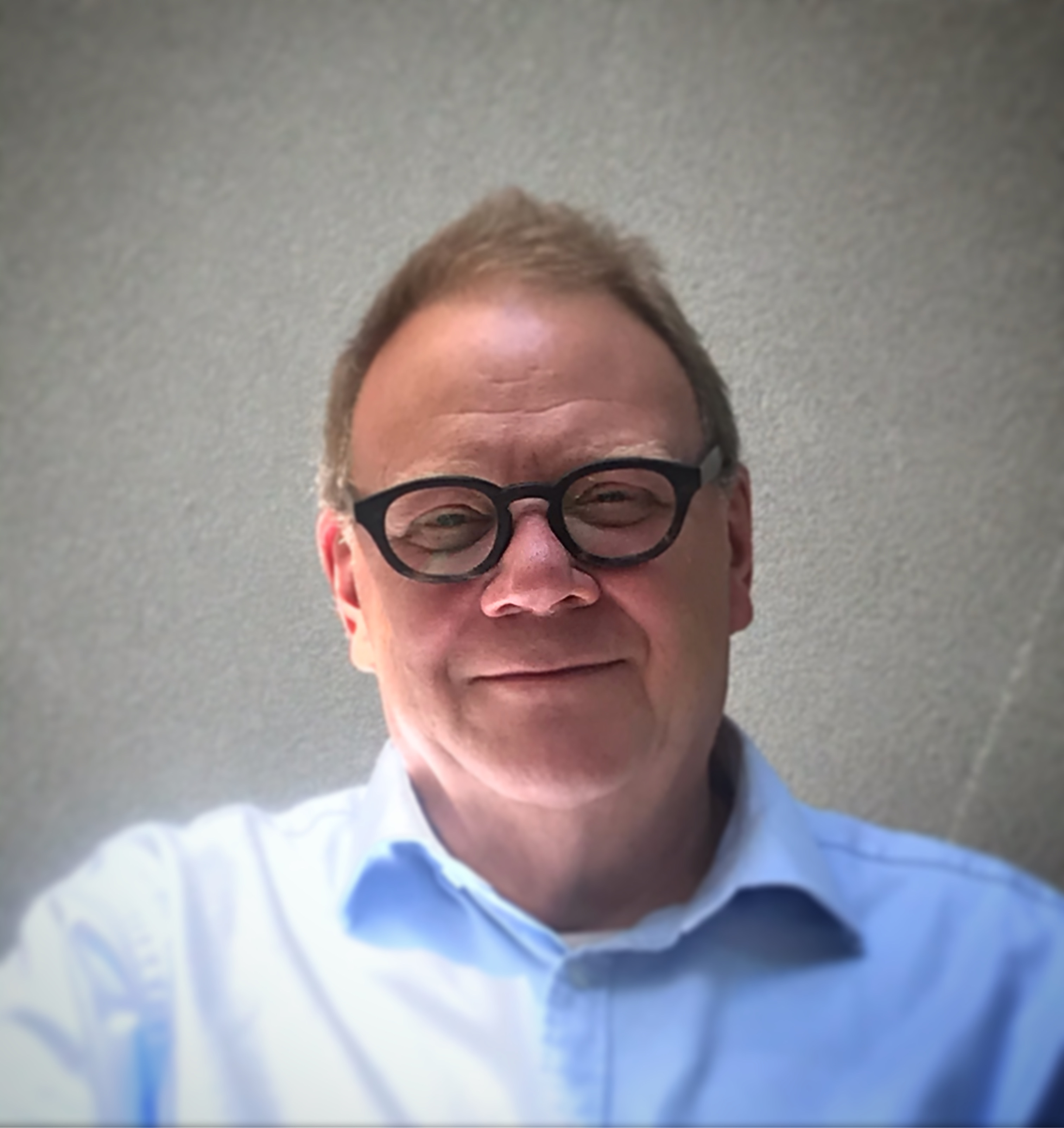
Nille Juul-Sørensen

Nille Juul-Sørensen (born 12 June 1958) is a Danish architect. He was CEO of Danish Design Centre in Copenhagen from 2011 until 2014 and now holds the position as Global Business Leader of Architecture at Arup in London.

== Biography ==
Nille Juul-Sørensen was educated at the School of Architecture at the Royal Danish Academy of Fine Arts. After his graduation in 1985, he worked for various architectural practices and the City of Copenhagen where he was involved in the planning of Ørestaden, before joining KHR Arkitekter in 1995 where he became a partner. In 2004 he left KHR Arkitekter to work for Arup's design office in London until 2011 when he became director of Danish Design Centre.

The work, he did for Malmö Citytunneln, Triangeln station, led in 2011 to the Kasper Salin Prize.

From 2012-2018 Nille was deputy Chair of the board of Aarhus School of Architecture.

Nille rejoined Arup, London, in 2014 as a Global Business Leader for Architecture. He has been working from Arup’s offices in Toronto and in Berlin from 2017-2022.

== Architectural works ==
Nille Juul-Sørensen has applied his holistic, user-focused approach to a range of architectural projects across the world, including leading the team behind the design of the new underground stations in Copenhagen’s newest Cityringen line.

Nille has been working with design of public transport infrastructure, with innovative station design, and by rethinking the value of combining stations and passenger experience with urban planning, his designs has contributed to high quality city development. His works include the 17 stations of Cityringen (2007-2019), the Copenhagen Metro (18 stations) (1995-2004), two stations of the City Tunnel in Malmö, Sweden (2002-2010), conceptual design for the Kolsås Line in Oslo, Norway (2004), and Flintholm Station in Copenhagen (2004).

== Gallery ==
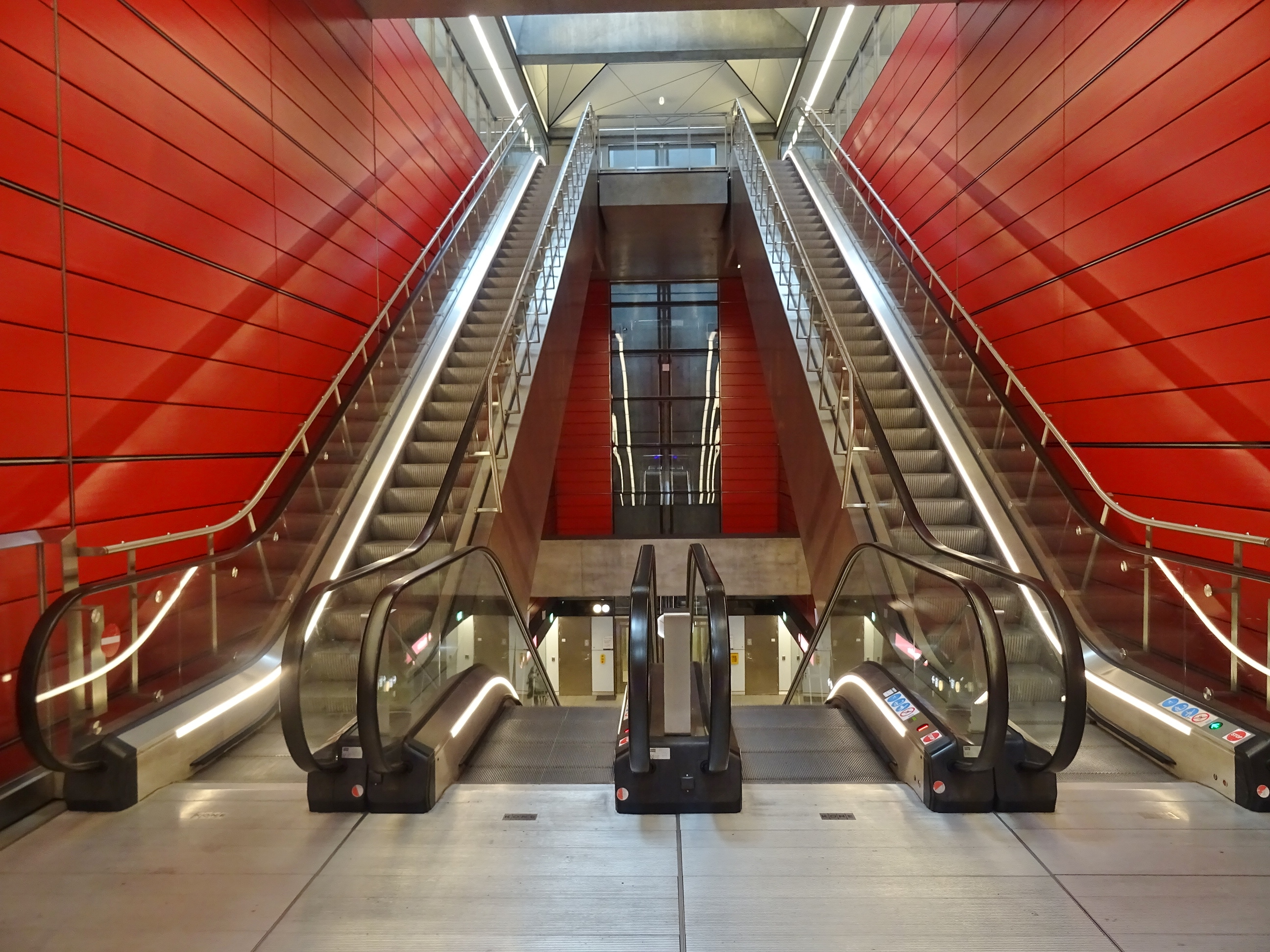
Nørrebro Station

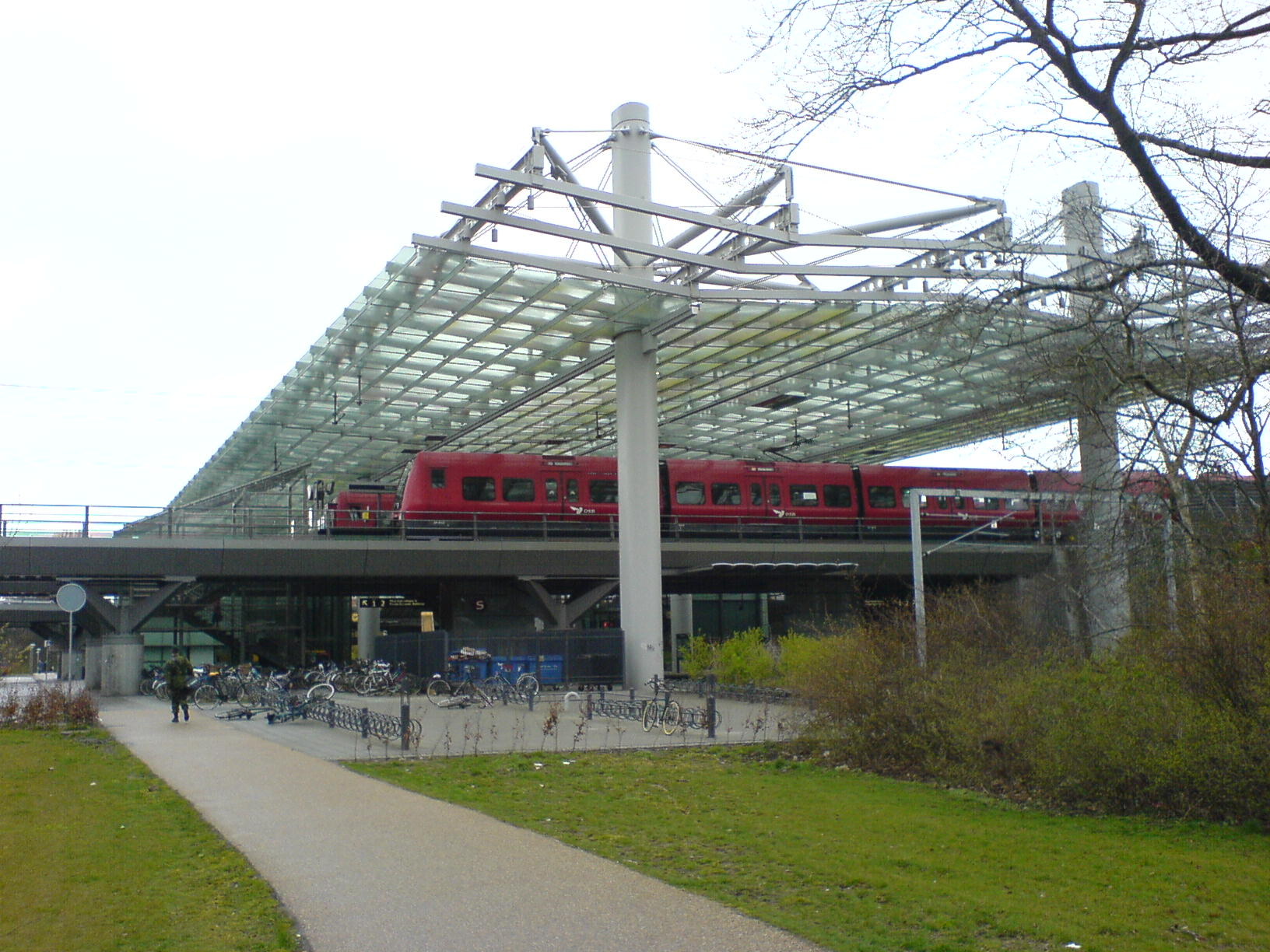

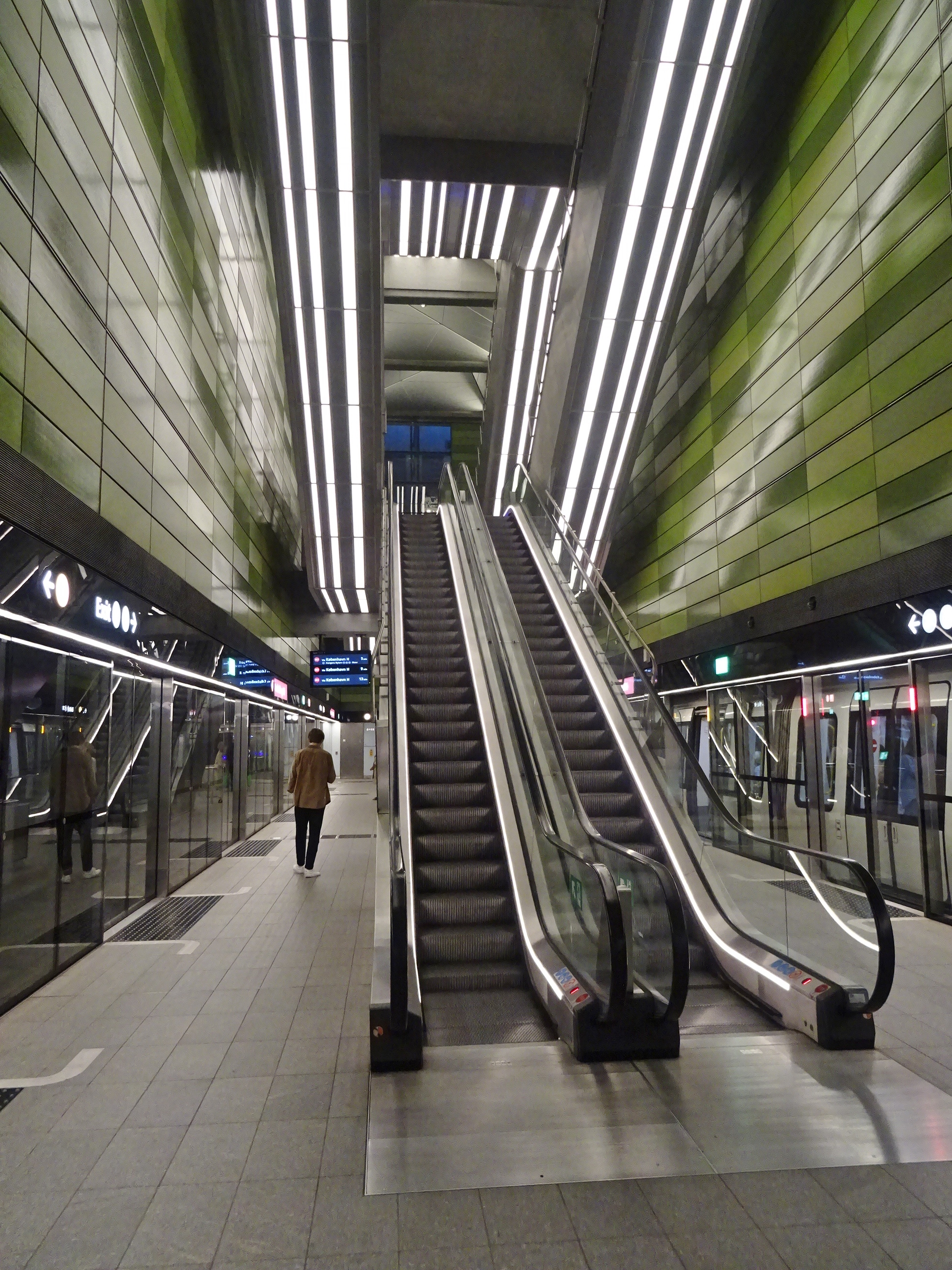

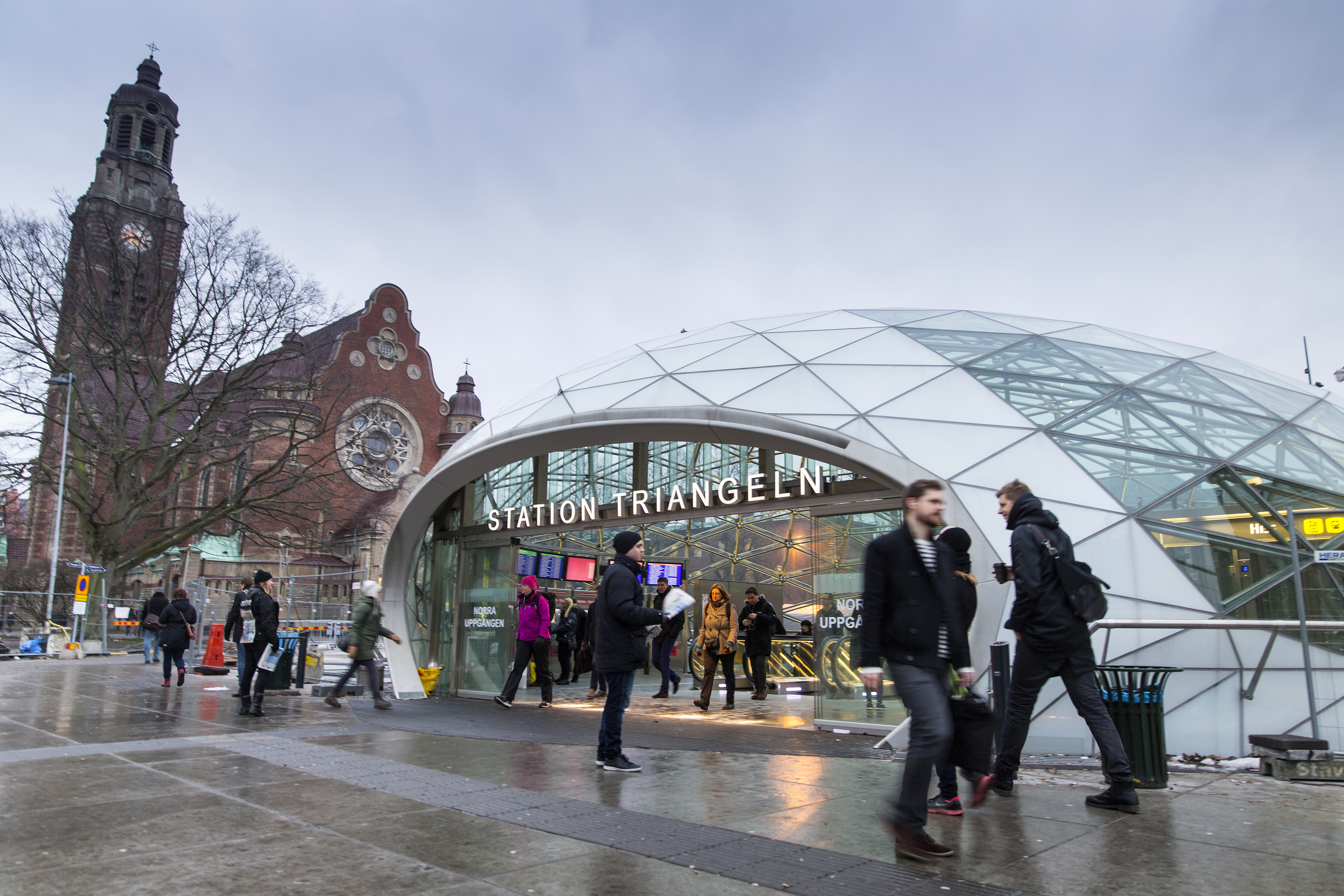

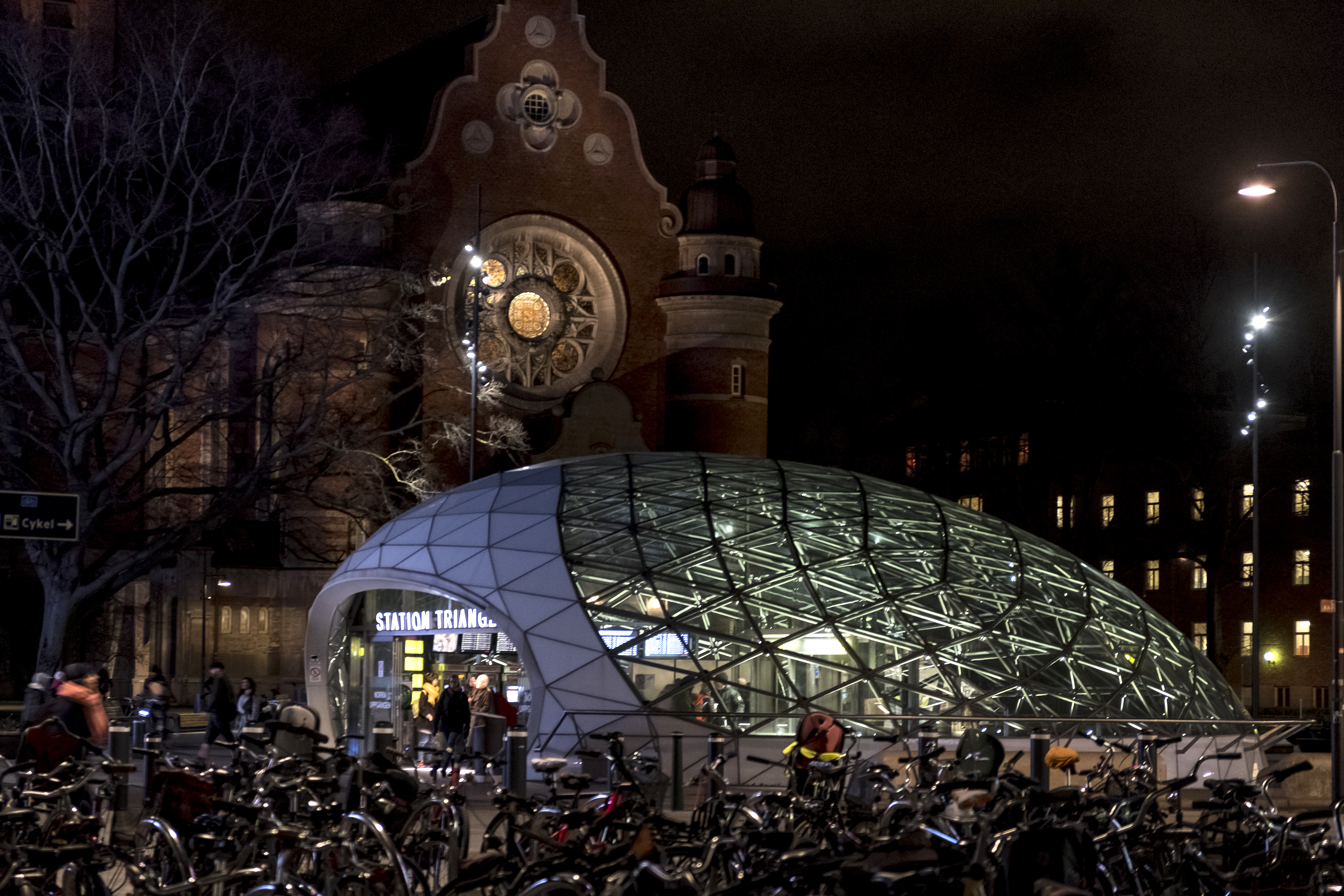
