= Ólafur Arnalds (scientist) =

Icelandic environmental scientist

- Born: Ólafur Gestur Arnalds; 5 January 1954 (age 72); Iceland
- Education: University of Iceland (BSc Geology, 1980) Montana State University (MSc Soil Science, 1984) Texas A&M University (PhD Soil Science, 1990)
- Spouse: Ása L. Aradóttir
- Children: 2
- Relatives: Ólafur Arnalds (nephew); Ólöf Arnalds (niece)
- Awards: Nordic Council Environment Prize (1998) Landgræðsluverðlaunin (2018)
- Scientific career
- Fields: Geology
- Theses: Myndun og gerð móajarðvegs í Kelduhverfi (1980); Radiocesium in Montana soils and applications for soil erosion measurement (1984)
- Doctoral advisors: Tom Hallmark, Larry Wilding
- Other academic advisors: Jerry Nielsen
- Website: www.moldin.net

Ólafur Arnalds (born 5 January 1954) is a soil and environmental scientist, a professor at the Agricultural University of Iceland. His nephew of the same name is composer Ólafur Arnalds, and musician Ólöf Arnalds is his niece.

Ólafur Arnalds studied geology at the University of Iceland (BSc) and soil science at Montana State University (MSc) and he received a PhD in soil science from Texas A&M University in 1990.

Arnalds is one of the pioneers in soil science research in Iceland and is the author of The Soils of Iceland published by Springer. He is the main author of a soil map for Iceland. He has contributed to international knowledge of soil of volcanic regions^{,} and authored overview publications on Andosols and the impact of volcanic ash on ecosystems. He led the national mapping of the staggering soil erosion in Iceland for which he received the prestigious Nordic Council Environmental Prize in 1998. His research drew attention to the unique nature of Icelandic barren areas or “deserts”, the generously active wind erosion surface processes and the enormous dust production from the deserts, which rates among the highest in the world.

Arnalds led the development of the Icelandic farmland landcover database (Nytjaland). He has worked together with Ása L. Aradóttir, on in land condition assessment methods, land use issues, carbon cycling, and ecological restoration research. They were among the founders of the UN UNESCO Land Restoration Training Program in Iceland (formerly with the UN University).

Olafur Arnalds is married to Dr. Ása L. Aradóttir professor at the Agricultural University of Iceland. They have two children.
