= List of fashion awards =

This list of fashion awards is an index to articles on notable awards given for fashion. It is organized by the country of the sponsoring organization, but entries are not always limited to that country.

== List ==
Country	Award	Sponsor
Austria	Vienna Fashion Awards	Vienna Fashion Awards
Canada	Canadian Arts and Fashion Awards	Canadian Arts and Fashion Awards
Europe & Australia	Barbara Dex Award	Songfestival.be
Europe & Australia	You're A Vision Award	Songfestival.be
France	ANDAM	Association Nationale pour le Développement des Arts de la Mode
France	Elle Style Awards	Elle (magazine)
France	LVMH Prize	LVMH
India	India Fashion Awards	Talent Factory
India	Eastern Fashion and Lifestyle Awards	EFL Awards
Netherlands	Dutch Fashion Awards	Dutch Fashion Foundation
New Zealand	Benson & Hedges Fashion Design Awards	Benson & Hedges
New Zealand	iD Dunedin Fashion Week	iD Dunedin
Pakistan	Hum Awards	Hum Network
Pakistan	Lux Style Awards	Lux Style Awards
Russia	Golden Spindle	Interregional Public Organization "National Academy of Fashion Industry"
Spain	IED Design Awards	Istituto Europeo di Design
Spain	MANGO Fashion Awards	Mango (retailer)
Sweden	H&M Design Award	Hennes & Mauritz
Turkey	Elle Style Awards (Turkey)	Elle (magazine)
United Kingdom	Brit Insurance Design Awards	Design Museum
United Kingdom	British Inspiration Awards	British Inspiration Awards
United Kingdom	Dress of the Year	Fashion Museum, Bath.
United Kingdom	MTV Europe Music Award for Best Look	ViacomCBS International Media Networks Europe
United Kingdom	Scottish Fashion Awards	Hartmann Media
United Kingdom	The Fashion Awards	British Fashion Council
United Kingdom	UK Lingerie Awards	UK Lingerie Awards
United States	Atrium Award	Henry W. Grady College of Journalism and Mass Communication and AmericasMart
United States	Coty Award	Coty, Inc.
United States	Council of Fashion Designers of America	Council of Fashion Designers of America
United States	Cutty Sark Men’s Fashion Awards	Cutty Sark
United States	International Best Dressed Hall of Fame List	Vanity Fair (magazine)
United States	Neiman Marcus Fashion Award	Stanley Marcus

== See also ==
- Lists of awards
- List of design awards
