= Fennia =

Fennia can refer to:

- An old Latin name for Finland, originating from the notion that people known as the Fenni in Tacitus' book Germania were Finns
- Fennia (journal), published by the Geographical Society of Finland
- MS Fennia, a car-passenger ferry
- Fennia Prize, a Finnish design award
- 1453 Fennia, an asteroid

== See also ==
- Finnia Wunram (born 1995), German swimmer
- Fenya, a Russian cant language, currently used in the Russian criminal underworld
