= Repack =

Repack may refer to:

- Repack (mountain bike race), an informal 1970s race series in mountain biking on Mount Tamalpais
- RePack, a packaging service
- Repacking, part of the process of spectrum reallocation in the United States
- A term used for file compression associated with video game piracy
