= Danish Design Award =

International design prize

- Description: Celebrating the difference design can make to people, business, and society
- Country: Denmark
- Presented by: Danish Design Centre & Design denmark

The Danish Design Award is an annual international design prize awarded by the member organization Design denmark and Danish Design Center in Copenhagen, Denmark.

In 1965, the first Danish design award, the ID Prize, was launched. This was followed by the IG Prize in 1980, which merged, into the Danish Design Award in 2000.

Now, the Danish Design Award is presented in a new version as a joint creation from the Danish Design Centre and the alliance of design professionals, Design denmark.

== History ==
1965 - Industrial Design Prize

Acknowledging the best in Danish design with an annual award began in 1965. At that time, the award was called the ID Prize. Danish design had become an important concept, not just in Scandinavia, but worldwide. Danish design represented - and continues to represent - simple, pure and aesthetic design with a clear user focus.

1980 – Industrial Graphic Design Prize

In 1980, the ID Prize had a sister award, the IG Prize, for the best industrial graphic design.

2000 – The Danish Design Prize

In 2000, the ID Prize and the IG Prize merged to become the Danish Design Prize. With the brief pause in 2005 and 2006, the Danish Design Prize 2007 marked an anniversary for Danish design: the design prizes were awarded for the fortieth time.

2007 – The Designmatters Award

A new introduction in 2007 was the Designmatters Award. This award goes to a small or medium-sized company that has made a serious effort to incorporate design and achieved a positive effect on the bottom line. The first recipient of the Designmatters Award was the lighting company Lightyears.

== Award winners ==
- Pelikan Design (2008/09)
- Timothy Jacob Jensen, Jacob Jensen Design
- Hansens Flødeis (2008/09)
- BC Lift (2008/09)
- Thomas Pedersen, Fredericia Furniture
- GN ReSound (2008/09)
- Foss
- Hatch & Bloom
- Kursiv
- Cecilie Manz
- Kontrapunkt AS strategic design and brand agency.
- Christian Flindt, Paustian
- Scandinavian DesignLab
- Mogens Holm-Rasmussen
- Hald Engel (2008/09)
- e-Types
- CPH Design
- Torpe&Kolsch (2007)
- 3Part
- Grundfos
- AIAIAI (2010/11)
