= IDCA =

IDCA can refer to:

- Industrial Design Council of Australia
- Institute for Cultural Action
- International Data Center Authority (IDCA)
- International Design Conference at Aspen (IDCA)
- International Development Cooperation Agency
- Islamic Dawah Centre of Australia
- International Digestive Cancer Alliance
