= Modulex =

Danish architectural signage company (est. 1963)

Modulex A/S
- Type: Multinational corporation
- Industry: 3D display, Virtual reality
- Founded: 1963
- Headquarters: Billund, Denmark
- Area served: Worldwide
- Key people: Ketil M. Staalesen (Chief Executive Officer); Mikkel Arreborg (Chief Finance & Operations Officer); Christine Jamieson (Chief Marketing Officer)
- Website: www.modulex.com

Modulex A/S is a Danish headquartered multi-national provider of architectural signage and visual communication solutions.

== History ==
Modulex was founded as an independent company in 1963 by The Lego Group. Over the years, the multi-national group has built multiple factories globally with a presence in over 300 cities across 45 countries.

At the inception of the group in 1963, Architectural models were the first Modulex product introduced into the Danish market. The following year the product was launched in England and Germany. In 1965, the production and sales of the models were switched to an Industrial layout.

In 1966 and 1967, the Control board was introduced. In the following years, Modulex A/S built a software kit for this product which increased sales. In 1972, Pocket boards which is another planning product was introduced.

In 1974, Modulex started developing a new product line known as Sign Systems. The company introduced the first sign system known as Interior which received the coveted ID prize, awarded annually to the best Danish design. In 1979, the group introduced the exterior sign system known as Exterior 500.

In 1982 Modulex entered the Middle East market. Within the period, the group developed an Arabic component system which received the IG prize for the best graphic design. The group also launched a new planning system known as Plancopy in the same year.

In 1983, Modulex introduced another novelty known as Interior 20 Flex. In 1984, the group launched Interior 30, a sign system that gave designers and architects unprecedented possibilities within graphics and design. The group also created a new business unit and introduced the first digital product known as EDS 700.

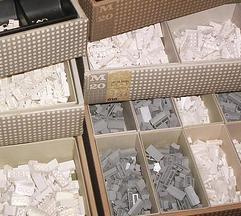
Modulex bricks

In the autumn of 1991, Modulex launched a new sign, a monolith system named Manhattan. In September 1991, Modulex was certified according to lISO 9001 after many years of work with a quality system. In 1992, Modulex developed a special line of products for the North American market based on two products, Interior 10 and Interior 20. In 1993, a new exterior sign system with curved shapes known as Pacific was developed.

In the fall of 1993, Milano was launched; an interior sign system mode of 100% aluminium. In March 1996, the first phase of Pacific Interior was introduced, a sign system with curved panels mounted on injection moulded frame members. Towards the end of 1995, the company initiated a rationalisation project called COSI (concentration and simplification). In March 1997, Pacific Interior became a complete sign system.

In March 1998, Modulex introduced Quadro; a simple sign developed for the identification of persons outdoors or at a workstation. In June 1999, the group introduce a completely new interior system known as Infinity.

On January 1, 2000, all marketing of the two product lines Interior 30 and Milano was stopped. In October, a new Windload evaluation system was introduced in connection with all exterior product lines. In October, 2000, the Atlantic product line was also introduced.

In the autumn of 2005, Silhouette Interior was introduced to the market. In the Fall of 2006, Modulex introduced Face to the market after a long development time. The product used laser cutting technology to shape aluminium plates with the possibility for illumination with light-emitting diodes (LED) either with outline or corona effect.

In 2008 the Design + Build creative services division is introduced, offering an integrated model that combines fabrication and installation for enhanced project delivery.

From 2019 to present, eco-friendly materials are introduced, offering a more sustainable option for signage materials.

In 2023, the group recorded its best financial performance.

In 2026, Modulex received a Bronze award at the Transform Awards for its work on the Spark project.

In November 2026, Modulex Group announced an agreement to acquire a minority stake in APCO Graphics, an architectural signage manufacturer founded in Atlanta, Georgia, in 1966 that trades as APCO Signs. Under the agreement, Modulex is to take an initial 20% ownership interest effective 1 January 2027, with an option to increase its holding over time. APCO is to continue operating under its own name from its existing locations.

== Products and services ==
Modulex offers wayfinding and architectural signage solutions, Global Brand Rollouts/Implementations, and cloud based project management for diverse industries including Governments, Corporates, Healthcare, Education, Hospitality, residential and many more.

== Awards ==
- 2022 – Green Network diploma: awarded to Modulex's Billund factory
- 2023 - ISO 14001 Certification: awarded to Modulex's Billund Factory.

== See also ==
- Lego
