= Dutch Fashion Awards =

The Dutch Fashion Awards is an annual awards ceremony first organised by the Dutch Fashion Foundation in 2007.

== Editions ==
=== Mercedes-Benz Dutch Fashion Awards 2007 ===
The first edition of the Mercedes-Benz Dutch Fashion Awards took place at the Beurs van Berlage in Amsterdam on 1 November 2007.

Nominees: Francisco van Benthum, Spijkers en Spijkers, Mada van Gaans, Klavers van Engelen, Jeroen van Tuyl, Jan Taminiau, Daryl van Wouw

Jury members: Maria Luisa Poumaillou, Valentina Maggi, Bernadette Whitmann, Christine Ellis, Cecilia Jesi Ferrari, Barbara Franchin

Award	Winner
Mercedes-Benz Dutch Fashion Award	Klavers van Engelen
Dutch Fashion Icon Femme	Carice van Houten
Dutch Fashion Icon Homme	Ruud van der Peijl

=== Mercedes-Benz Dutch Fashion Awards 2008 ===
The second edition of the Mercedes-Benz Dutch Fashion Awards took place at the Beurs van Berlage in Amsterdam on 7 November 2008.

Nominees: Francisco van Benthum, G+N, Percy Irausquin, Jeroen van Tuyl, Monique van Heist, Mada van Gaans, Joline Jolink

Jury members: Christine Ellis, Terron Schaefer, Franck Jacquard, Paul Helbers, Andreina Longhi, Beppe Angiolini

Award	Winner
Mercedes-Benz Dutch Fashion Award	Monique van Heist
Dutch Fashion Incubator Award	Monique van Heist
Dutch Fashion Media Award	Monique van Heist
Dutch Fashion Icon Femme	Aynouk Tan
Dutch Fashion Icon Homme	Carlo Wijnands

=== Mercedes-Benz Dutch Fashion Awards 2009 ===
The third edition of the Mercedes-Benz Dutch Fashion Awards took place at the Grote Kerk in The Hague on 6 November 2009.

Nominees: Jeroen van Tuyl, Iris van Herpen, Sjaak Hullekes, Mada van Gaans, Bas Kosters

Jury members: Beppe Angiolini, Valentina Maggi, Jean Jacques Picart, Marc Gysemans, Wilbert Das

Award	Winner
Mercedes-Benz Dutch Fashion Award	Sjaak Hullekes
Dutch Fashion Incubator Award	Bas Kosters
Dutch Fashion Media Award	Iris van Herpen
Dutch Fashion Icon Femme	Bonnie Orleans Voss
Dutch Fashion Icon Homme	Ferry van der Nat

=== Dutch Fashion Awards 2010 ===
The fourth edition of the Dutch Fashion Awards took place at the Grote Kerk in The Hague on 5 November 2010.

Nominees: Bas Kosters, Claes Iversen, Conny Groenewegen, Iris van Herpen, Marcha Hüskes

Jury members: Beppe Angiolini, Donald Potard, Mandi Lennard, Mauro Galligari, Mauro Marcos Fabbri

Award	Winner
Mercedes-Benz Dutch Fashion Award	Iris van Herpen
Dutch Fashion Incubator Award	Iris van Herpen
International Fashion Incubator Award	Bas Kosters
Dutch Fashion Accessory Award	Iris van Herpen
Dutch Fashion Icon Femme	Stacey Rookhuizen
Dutch Fashion Icon Homme	Jean Paul Paula

== See also ==
- List of fashion awards

== Sources ==
- 2007-09-01, Reclameweek, ‘Mercedes is haute couture’
- 2007-11-02, NRC Handelsbald, ‘Duo wint Dutch Fashion Award’, Georgette Koning
- 2007-11-02, Het Parool, ‘Prijs Mercedes voor mode’
- 2008-09-13, Algemeen Dagblad, ‘Samenwerking ter promotie Nederlands modetalent’, Judith Kloppenburg
- 2008-11-11, Style.com, ‘Multiple Viktors, Rolfs at Dutch Fashion Awards’, Gudrun Wilcocks, http://www.style.com/stylefile/2008/11/multiple-viktors-rolfs-at-dutch-fashion-awards
- 2008-12-01, MOOD magazine, ‘Dutch Fashion Awards help Young designers’
- 2009-11-08, De Telegraaf, ‘Creaties Hullekes vallen in de smaak’, Michou Basu
- 2009-12-01, INDIE magazine, ‘A touch of Dutch’, Claudia Hubmann
- 2010-01-05, Het Parool, ‘Hulp voor starters in de mode’
- 2010-11-09, Vogue.com UK, ‘One to watch’, Lauren Milligan, https://web.archive.org/web/20110612024835/http://www.vogue.co.uk/news/daily/101109-iris-van-herpen-wins-award.aspx
- 2010-11-16, Milano Finanza, ‘Van Herpen vince l’edizione 2010 del Dutch Fashion Award’, Michela Zio
