= Bas Kosters =

Dutch fashion designer

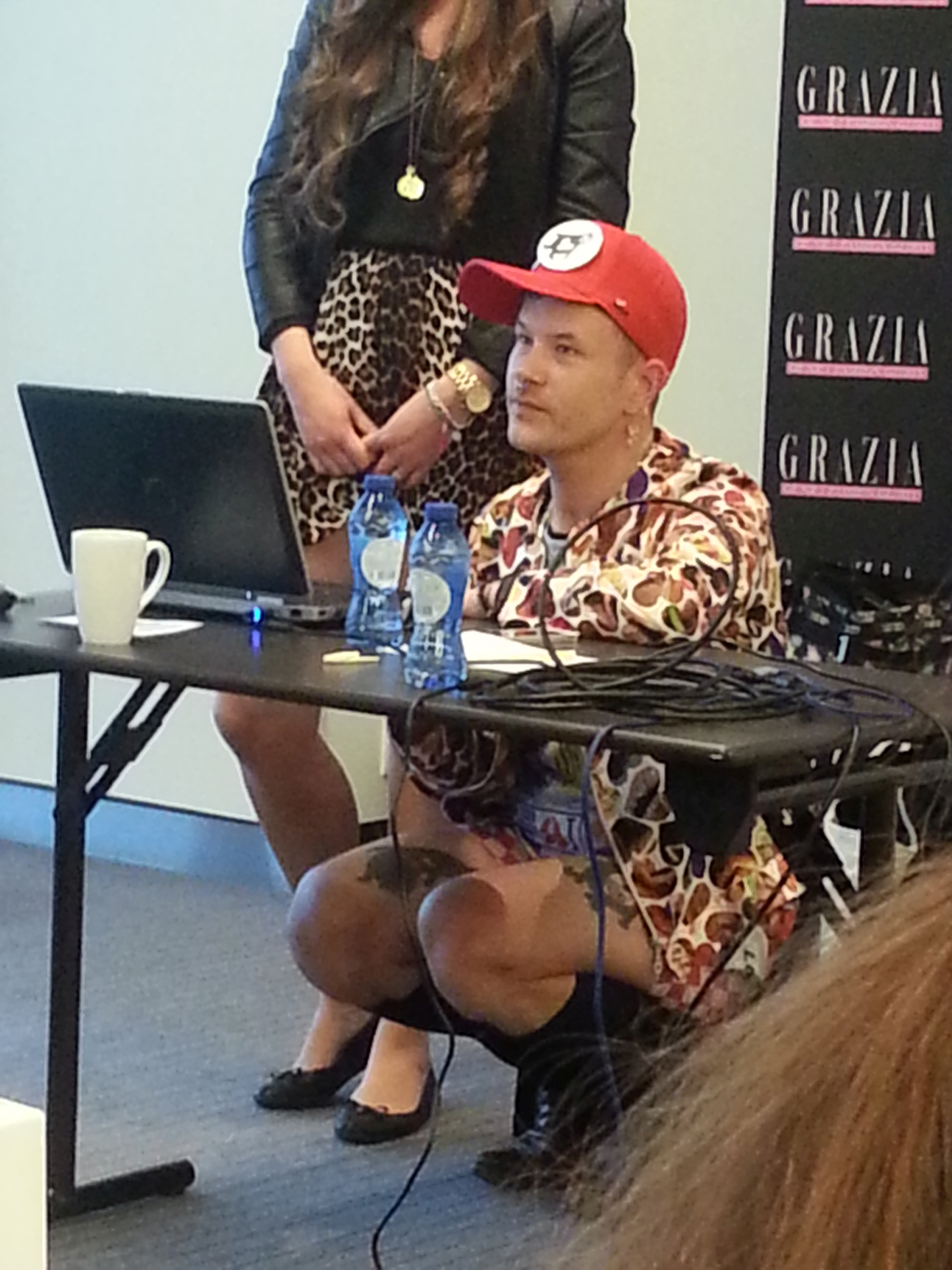
- Born: Bas Kosters; June 5, 1977; Zutphen, The Netherlands
- Years active: 2000–present
- Label: Bas Kosters Studio
- Awards: Robijn Fashion Award, Dutch Fashion International Incubator Award

Bas Kosters (born June 5, 1977, in Zutphen) is a Dutch fashion designer, known for his colourful designs and the use of prints. In 2003 he graduated from the Fashion Institute in Arnhem with the collection 'Two Teacups and a Frying Pan', with this collection he also won the Robijn Fashion Award. In 2005 he established the Bas Kosters Studio in Amsterdam. In 2009 he won the Dutch Fashion Incubator Award and in 2010 he won the Dutch Fashion International Incubator Award.

== Biography ==
Bas Kosters was born and raised in the Dutch town Zutphen. He studied at the Isendoorn college in Warnsveld and then fashion at the Rijn IJssel College in Arnhem where he graduated in 1997. Then he studied Fashion Design at the AKI Academy of Fine Arts in Enschede until his graduation in 2001. In 2003 he got his master's degree at the Fashion Institute Arnhem, his graduation collection earned him the Robijn Fashion Award. In 2004 Bas Kosters designed a stroller for Bugaboo International, the collaboration was repeated in 2011. In 2005 he established Bas Kosters Studio. Since 2006 he regularly presents new collections, both during Amsterdam Fashion Week, and the London Fashion Week, like his collection The Munchies. In 2012 he presents the collection 'That puts the 'U’ in Ugly', that includes the 'penis pants' a legging with a print of penises. This item (officially called 'Is that a cock or your legs') gets a lot of international attention. Bas Kosters is fascinated by clowns and even dedicated a collection to them: Clowns Are People Too.

== Anti Fashion Party ==
Since 2007 Bas Kosters has been organizing the Anti Fashion Party twice a year. It's meant as a counterpart of the 'glamorous' Amsterdam Fashion Week".

== Collections ==
- 2014: Clowns are people too, A/W
- 2014: The Munchies, S/S
- 2013: The Rebellious Shadow, A/W
- 2012: LOVE “FUCK YEAH”, S/S
- 2012: 12Tree, A/W
- 2012: That puts the ‘U’ in Ugly, S/S
- 2011: Fashion Mutant Pret a Porter, A/W
- 2011: Par-Tea collection, S/S
- 2010: Living Too Hard Pret a Porter, A/W
- 2009: Freedom Collection
- 2008: Mini Dance Collection
- 2007: Le Salon Explosif
- 2006: Dans les rues d’Amsterdam
- 2003: Two teacups and a fryingpan
- 2001: Containerkoninginnen (Dumpster Queens)
- 2000: Parade

== Awards ==
- 2018, Cultuurfonds Fashion Stipend
- 2010, Dutch Fashion International Incubator Award, Dutch Fashion Awards
- 2009, Dutch Fashion Incubator Award, Dutch Fashion Awards
- 2003, Robijn Fashion Award

== Websites ==
- Official website
- Extra Kak Magazine on Issuu
