= Nordic Council Environment Prize =

- Awarded for: "exemplary efforts to integrate respect for the environment into ... business or work" or "some other form of extraordinary initiative on behalf of the environment"
- Country: Nordic countries
- Presented by: Nordic Council
- Reward: DKK 350,000
- First award: 1995
- Website: norden.org/en/environmentprize

The Nordic Council Environment Prize (also known as the Nordic Council Nature and Environment Prize) is awarded each year to a Nordic company, organization, or individual to recognize "exemplary efforts to integrate respect for the environment into their business or work or for some other form of extraordinary initiative on behalf of the environment". The nominees and winner are chosen by a 13-person committee consisting of two representatives each from Denmark, Norway, Sweden, Finland, and Iceland, as well as one each from the Faroe Islands, Greenland, and Åland. The first prize was awarded in 1995. Since 2005, the committee has chosen a theme each year for the nominations and award.

== Prize recipients ==
Year	Theme	Winner	Country/Region
1995	–	Torleif Ingelög	Sweden
1996	–	Inuit Circumpolar Conference	Greenland
1997	–	The Institute of Product Development at the Technical University of Denmark	Denmark
1998	–	The "Jarðvegsvernd" project, led by Ólafur Arnalds	Iceland
1999	–	Agenda 21 office, Åland Natur & Miljö	Åland
2000	–	Bellona Foundation	Norway
2001	–	Mats Segnestam	Sweden
2002	–	Arne Næss	Norway
2003	–	Luonto-Liitto (Finnish Nature League)	Finland
2004	–	Coalition Clean Baltic	multiple countries
2005	Contributions to the Nordic cultural landscape	Ann-Cecilie Norderhaug	Norway
2006	Climate change and adaption	Bogi Hansen	Faroe Islands
2007	Environmentally sustainable cities	Albertslund Municipality	Denmark
2008	Energy efficiency	Marorka marine energy management company	Iceland
2009	Promoting nature and outdoor recreation	Swedish forest schools initiative "I Ur och Skur" (Rain or Shine)	Sweden
2010	Green investment management	The banks Merkur Andelskasse, Ekobanken, and Cultura Sparebank	Denmark, Sweden, and Norway
2011	Sustainable tourism	Scandic Hotels	Norway
2012	Biodiversity	Olli Manninen	Finland
2013	Resource efficiency	Selina Juul and the Stop Wasting Food movement	Denmark
2014	Environmental work by a Nordic town or community	City of Reykjavík	Iceland
2015	Reduction of greenhouse gas emissions	SEV energy company	Faroe Islands
2016	Digital promotion of sustainable living	Too Good To Go, an app that combats food waste by enabling users to buy surplus food from restaurants at affordable prices	Denmark
2017	Initiatives that bring people closer to the waste-free society.	RePack, a packaging service which enables the return and reuse of delivery packaging for online retailers and their users.	Finland
2018	Participatory monitoring protecting marine life and helping to achieve the UN Sustainable Development Goals.	PISUNA-net Local Observations database developed to record, archive, and share indigenous and local knowledge and expertise on natural resources and resource use. This information is generously shared with the public by the observers and the communities within which the observers reside.	Greenland
2019	Initiatives that promote sustainable consumption and production by doing more and better with less.	Greta Thunberg for her mobilisation of millions of people around the world to demand climate action now. She declined the award, in protest at a lack of climate action.	Sweden
2020	Biodiversity of Faroese nature	Jens-Kjeld Jensen	Faroe Islands
2021	Climate data base	Concito	Denmark
2022	Management of wetlands	City of Mariehamn	Åland, Finland
2023	Pioneering textile recycling	Renewcell (now Circulose)	Sweden
2024	For her interdisciplinary interests and her focus on reducing CO2 emissions and increasing recycling in the construction industry.	Arnhildur Pálmadóttir	Iceland
2025	Creating green local communities	Grønne Nabofællesskaber	Denmark

== See also ==
- List of environmental awards
