= MANGO Fashion Awards =

Fashion event held since 2007

MANGO Fashion Awards is a fashion event organized since 2007 by the Catalan Spanish transnational Mango, where prizes "El Botón" and "El Botón de Oro" are awarded. "El Botón" is given to young fashion talents with the aim of promoting young talent work. The winner gets a prize of 300,000 euros, the largest of its kind, and to put on sale in Mango store.

== Awards ==
"El Botón"

- Sandrina Fasoli i Michaël Marson (2007)
- Jin Youn Lee (2008)
- (2009)

"El Botón de Oro"

- Valentino (2007)
- Oscar de la Renta (2008)
- Jean-Paul Gaultier (2009)

== See also ==
- List of fashion awards
