= Tapani Hyvönen =

Tapani Hyvönen (born June 6, 1947) is a Finnish designer and founder and board member of ED-Design Ltd. in Turku, Finland.

Born in Sotkamo, Finland, Tapani Hyvönen studied industrial design at the University of Art and Design Helsinki (UIAH, now part of the Aalto University) and graduated in 1974. He started his own design agency, Destem Ltd., in 1976. In 1990, Destem merged with Ergonomia Design to form ED-Design Ltd., today one of the biggest product design agencies in the Nordic area.

For design assignments mostly from the Finnish electronics industry, Hyvönen has been honoured with the National Art & Design Award 1984, Industrial Designer of the Year award in 1991, and the Pro Finnish Design award the following year.

Tapani Hyvönen has held important positions with organisations such as the University of Art and Design Helsinki (UIAH), Ornamo, Design Forum Finland, and Icsid, where he was member of the executive board between 1999 and 2003. His jury memberships include competitions such as the Finnish Design Management Award, Pro Finnish Design Award, and the Fennia Prize. Internationally, Hyvönen has served in juries for the NID Business World Design Excellence Award (India), the Osaka Design Competition (Japan), Adolf Loos Staatspreis Design, Austria The Red Dot awards (Germany and Singapore), and Design for Asia Award, (Hong Kong).
