= Dutch Fashion Foundation =

The Dutch Fashion Foundation is a non-profit Dutch fashion incubator for upcoming Dutch fashion designers. It focuses on strengthening the social, economic, and cultural role of Dutch fashion on a national and international level.

== History ==
The Dutch Fashion Foundation originated out of a growing need for the development of a Dutch fashion climate. In 2000, Angelique Westerhof, co-founder and director of the fashion master course Fashion Institute Arnhem, observed that graduating fashion designers had difficulties presenting their collections to a wider audience, setting up their own labels, and connecting with the international fashion industry. She established the Dutch Fashion Foundation in 2001 to elevate the status of a collective Dutch fashion discipline and bridge the gap between Dutch designers and the global market.

In May 2003, the Dutch Fashion Foundation was officially introduced after operating as a silent corporation for two years. The foundation was the initiator and organiser of the annual Dutch Fashion Awards and the international campaign Dutch Touch. Since 2011, it has also partnered with the Cultuurfonds to organise and present the annual Cultuurfonds Mode Stipendium, providing substantial financial grants to outstanding Dutch fashion talent.

== See also ==
- Fashion Is For Every Body
