= Angelique Westerhof =

- Born: 1969 (age 56–57); Vorden, Netherlands
- Occupation: Fashion promoter
- Known for: Dutch Fashion Foundation (director)

Angelique Westerhof (born 1969, Vorden, the Netherlands) is the director of the Dutch Fashion Foundation and co-founder of the fashion master course at the Fashion Institute Arnhem.

== Career ==
In 1998 Westerhof was asked by the Arnhem Academy of Art and Design (ArtEZ) to establish a one-year fashion masters course at the Fashion Institute Arnhem (FIA), together with fashion illustrator Pieter 't Hoen. Westerhof and 't Hoen were both established in the international fashion industry, and worked to establish contacts between young designers and the international fashion scene. FIA ran workshops in several countries with leading professionals and a graduation show in Paris.

In 2001, to assist graduates from FIA to present their collections to a wider audience and establish themselves in the fashion industry, Westerhof set up the Dutch Fashion Foundation, to promote Dutch fashion in the Netherlands and abroad.
