= Australian Good Design Awards =

Australian design award established 1954

- Native name: Good Design Australia
- Description: Recognizing excellence in design and innovation across multiple disciplines
- Country: Australia
- Presented by: Good Design Australia
- Website: good-design.org

The Australian Good Design Awards, formerly known as the Australian International Design Awards or Australian Design Awards are a series of awards recognising Australian achievements in industrial design. The awards are a program of the Industrial Design Council of Australia which was established in 1958. The awards are recognized by the International Council of Societies of Industrial Design.

== History ==
In 1958, the Industrial Design Council of Australia (IDCA) was established by the Government of Australia in order to promote the standards and value of Australian industrial design. Its program of awards was based on the model of the United Kingdom Design Council which had been established by Winston Churchill's 1944 government to assist the UK post-war economic recovery. Its first chairman was Essington Lewis.

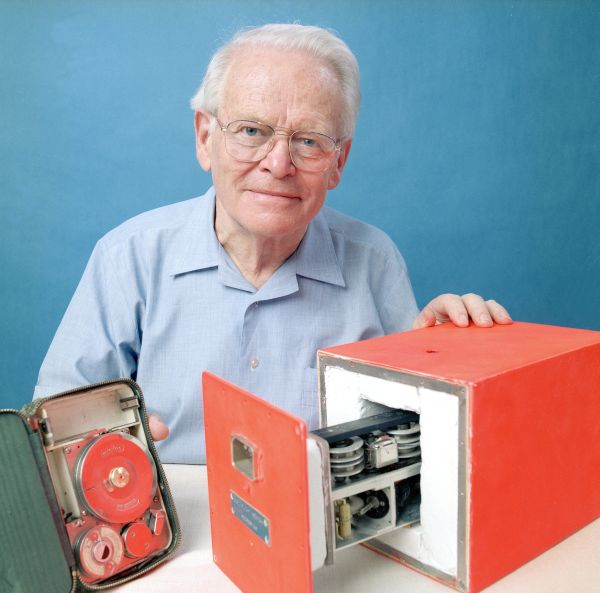
David Warren with the BlackBox flight recorder prototype 1960 winner.

The IDCA opened the first Australian Design Centre in Melbourne in 1964 with an exhibition of award winning design objects and in 1967, Prince Philip, Duke of Edinburgh sponsored the Prince Philip Prize for Australian Design. In 1968, after receiving over 90 entries, the IDCA awarded the inaugural Prince Philip prize to Kenneth Gibson for his design of a self-propelled grain header. The Prince Philip Prize continued until 1987.

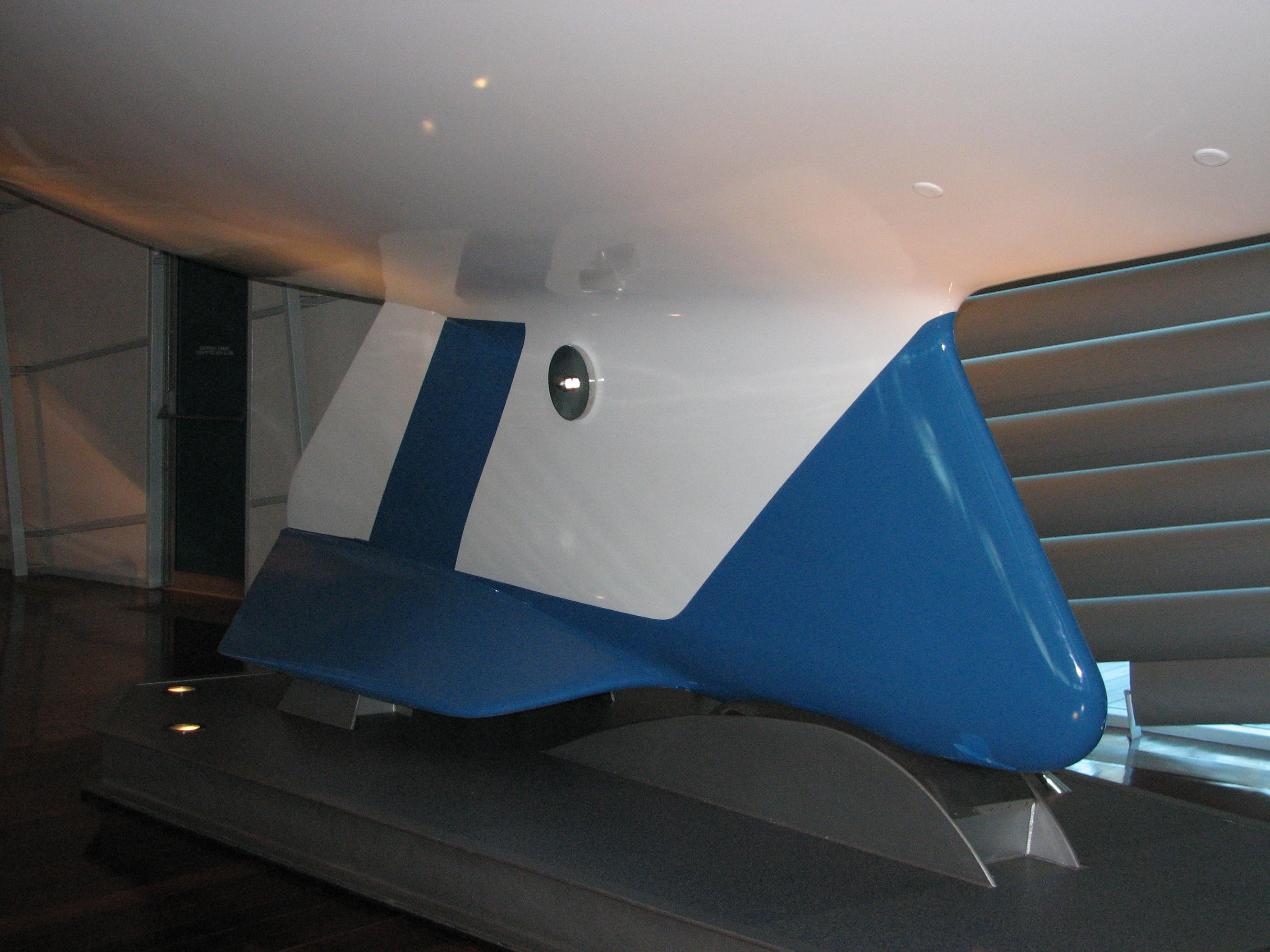
Australia II winged keel, winner 1983.

The Australian Broadcasting Corporation televised the awards from 1978. The first broadcast was hosted by Ita Buttrose and was viewed by at least 4 million people. In 1979, the first annual yearbook of Australian Good Design Award winners was published.

Over time, the IDCA had increasing uncertainty in funding including lack of government funding and decreasing support from the design industry resulting in lack of direction. In 1987, the IDCA was rebranded as the Australian Design Council. Its focus was providing design information and training. One of its new programs was the Australian Design Mark certification scheme. The Australian Design Council continued to 1993.

Standards Australia assumed management of the Australian Design Awards in 1991. In 1992, the Powerhouse Museum (Museum of Applied Arts and Sciences (MAAS)) in Sydney, created an annual display of the winning award objects. In 1997, for the first time, applications for the awards were received online. The presentation of the awards took place at a black tie event at the Metro Theatre in Sydney. However, high operating costs and a limited revenue stream in the late 1990s led to redundancies.

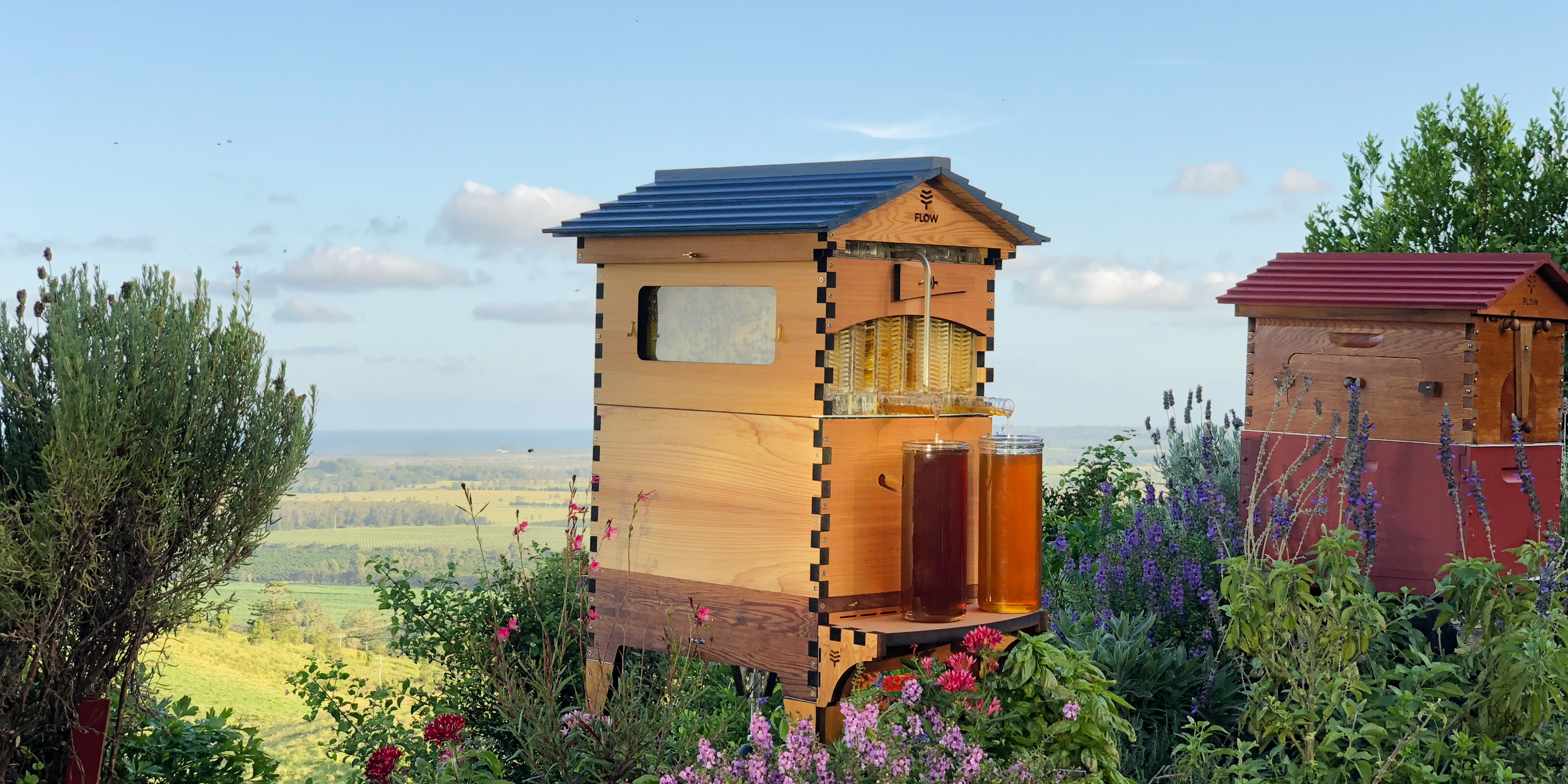
Flow Hive, winner 2016

In 2008, applications from international designers of products on the Australian market were accepted. The award program management was transferred to Good Design Australia in 2010. There was a further rebranding in 2015 to the Good Design Awards.

== Awards ==
The applicants' entries are divided into groups including built environment, communication, concept, design research, digital, engineering design, fashion and textiles, next gen, policy design, product design, service design, sustainability and social impact.

For each group, a panel of 80 independent jurors judges the entries on good design, design innovation, and design impact. Group and overall winners receive accolades such as the Good Design Tick (for enhanced marketing), and a certificate or trophy. The prize may also include promotional exposure assistance and inclusion in a yearbook and index of winners.

Special recognition is also given to the Designer who has made significant impact to Australian design over the course of their career (Australian Design Prize); to the team who has performed well in the award program and has a design culture within (Good Design Team of the Year Award); and to an outstanding design individual, team, project or design practice (Michael Bryce Patron's Award. Other special awards include the Women in Design Award; the Indigenous Design Award; and the Automotive Design Award.

In 2026, the Powerhouse Museum and David Jones Pty Ltd. offered a commission worth A$50,000 to a young designer to create over a nine month period a prototype new product for the contemporary Australian residence.

== Examples of successful entries ==
Included in this table are some notable award winning designs.

Year	Design	Designer
1960	Black box flight recorder.	Darren Warren
1970	Telecom Gold Phone.	Paul Schremmer
1972	Wiltshire Staysharp Knife.	Peter Bayly and Associates
1974	Bunyip Slipper Imp with Shakaerator plow.	Yeoman's Plow Company
1976	Australian Montreal Olympic team swimwear	Speedo Swimwear
1977	Sebel Integra Chair.	Charles Furey and Associates, Sebel.
1979	Décor BYO Wine Carrier	Richard Carlson
1982	Caroma Duoset Toilet.	Bruce Thompson, Caroma
1983	Australia II winged keel	Ben Lexcen
1984	Audio Tactile Pedestrian Detector Button.	Nielsen Design Associates
1986	Décor Wine Cask Cooler.	Richard Carlson and Tony Wolfenden
2000	Cochlear implant.	Cochlear Ltd.
2001	Solar Sailor Tourism Ferry.	Dr Robert Dane
2003	Eveready Dolphin Mark 5 Lantern.	Design Resource, Australia
2006	VentrAssist Artificial Heart.	Ventracor
2009	Qantas A380 Economy Seat.	Marc Newson, QANTAS, Recaro Aircraft Seating
2016	Flow Hive.	Cedar and Stuart Anderson and Evolve group
2019	RASTRUM 3D Bioprinter.	Inventia
2025	Airtouch CPAP mask	Resmed mask Design Team

== See also ==
- List of design awards
