= British Inspiration Awards =

- Awarded for: Achievement in the creative industries of Britain
- Location: London
- Country: United Kingdom
- Presented by: Industry figures
- First award: 2010
- Website: www.britishinspirationawards.co.uk

The British Inspiration Awards (BIAs) are a set of industry awards celebrating achievement in the creative industries of the United Kingdom, organised by David Yarnton, the UK managing director for Nintendo. The inaugural awards took place at a ceremony in London on 23 April 2010. The awards, in the shape of a gold statue of Boudica, were presented in a number of categories including art, design, entertainment, fashion and science. All proceeds of the awards are to be donated to various charities.

== History ==
With the UK in a recession in the late 2000s, and with a steadily declining manufacturing industry and little natural resources, the creative sector was believed to be the basis for future growth, and was as of 2010 was estimated to already contribute £110billion to the economy per annum, contribute two million jobs, and number over businesses classed as creative.

The BIAs were initiated by David Yarnton, the UK managing director for Nintendo. He was of the opinion that "The UK is the creative capital of the World" and it was "about time that the UK creative sector was recognised for its achievements". He was of the belief that, although a world leader in the creative industries, Britain had a tendency to understate its achievements, and thus sought to correct that. The BIAs were therefore created to recognise those who have already contributed to Great Britain's "economic, social and artistic development through creative endeavor", and highlight the opportunities Britain offered in the creative industries.

On the eve of the 2010 United Kingdom general election campaign, on 16 March 2010 the BIAs attracted the support of the Prime Minister Gordon Brown, Conservative Party leader David Cameron and Liberal Democrat Party leader Nick Clegg. The inaugural BIAs were to be presented in a daytime ceremony at The Brewery near Barbican Centre in London on 23 April 2010 (St George's Day). The nominees in each category were announced on 14 April 2010.

Attendees of the ceremony, hosted by Richard Madeley, included nominees David Arnold, Michael Eavis and Gareth Pugh, as well as Phillip Schofield, Ant and Dec, Helen Skelton and Andy Akinwolere.

== The Award ==
The BIA is given "In recognition of an individual, company or groups contribution to the Creative Economy of Great Britain and the Inspiration that they give to others". Individual awards are to be presented in categories for the Film; Television; Music; Fashion; Arts; Design; Innovation, Enterprise and Industry; Science and Technology; and Interactive Entertainment industry sectors, as well as a Special Recognition award.

The BIAs use the symbol of Boudica as their logo and award. Described by the BIA organisers as a "forward looking woman who inspired others around her", Boudica was a queen of the ancient tribe of the Iceni of present-day Norfolk, who in AD 60 or 61 led them and neighbouring tribes in a revolt against the authority of Gaius Suetonius Paulinus, the Roman Governor of Britain, before ultimately being defeated.

The award itself is a gold statue of the stylised version of Boudica depicted in the BIA logo. The logo shows this stylistic representation of Boudica moving forward using four shades of colour, symbolising England, Scotland, Wales and Northern Ireland "moving forward together as one."

== Judges ==
The BIA committee headed by Yarnton is made up of: Chairman: David Yarnton – Russ Lindsay – Wendy Malem – Tom George – Nicola Mendelsohn – Philip Snape – Allan McLaughlin – Adam Clyne – Chris Maples – Caroline Taylor – Elisabeth Murdoch – Richard Desmond – Sir George Martin – Colonel Ben Farrell MBE – Lord Michael Grade – Lucian Grange CBE – Cilla Snowball CBE – Ian Livingstone OBE – Sir Terence Conran – Baroness Susan Greenfield

== Beneficiaries ==
The proceeds of the BIAs were to be donated to charity through the Dallaglio Foundation and GamesAid. Through the Dallaglio Foundation, a charitable foundation set up by the ex-England rugby player Lawrence Dallaglio, the major beneficiary of the BIAs proceeds would be Cancer Research UK, with money also going to Help for Heroes (for the UK Armed Forces), the Rugby Players' Association Benevolent Fund, Leukaemia & Lymphoma Research and DebRA (for Epidermolysis bullosa), while GamesAid, a UK charity, is a distributor of charitable funds from the video games industry to children's charities predominantly operating in the UK.

== Nominees and winners ==
- Winners in **bold**.

=== Film ===
- Richard Curtis CBE, film and television writer and director
- Sir Ian McKellen CH, CBE, stage and screen actor
- **Nick Park** CBE, animator, creator of Wallace and Gromit

=== Television ===
- **Elisabeth Murdoch**, founder of production company Shine Limited
- Sir David Attenborough OM, CH, CVO, CBE, broadcaster and naturalist
- Melvyn Bragg, broadcaster, host of The South Bank Show

=== Music ===
- **Sir George Martin** CBE, producer of all but one of The Beatles albums
- Gareth Malone, choirmaster and broadcaster, subject of The Choir television series
- Brian Eno, producer, musician, songwriter
- David Arnold, film composer

=== Fashion ===
- **Alexander McQueen** CBE, (posthumous nomination), fashion designer
- Gareth Pugh, fashion designer
- Nick Knight, fashion photographer, founder of SHOWstudio.com

=== Arts ===
- **Matthew Bourne** OBE, ballet dancers and choreographer
- Antony Gormley OBE, sculptor, creator of The Angel of the North
- Zaha Hadid CBE, architect
- Damien Hirst, conceptual artist

=== Design ===
- Jonathan Ive CBE, designer for Apple Inc
- Sir Norman Foster OM, architect, founder of Foster and Partners
- **Sir Terence Conran**, designer, restaurateur, retailer, writer

=== Innovation, Enterprise and Industry ===
- Sir Richard Branson, entrepreneur, founder of Virgin Group
- **Sir James Dyson**, inventor, founder of Dyson
- Sir Tim Berners-Lee, OM, KBE, computer scientist, inventor of the World Wide Web

=== Science and Technology ===
- **Baroness Susan Greenfield** CBE, Professor of Synaptic Pharmacology at Oxford University
- James Lovelock CH, CBE, scientist, environmentalist and futurologist, proposer of the Gaia hypothesis
- Matt McGrath, founder of Aircraft Medical medical device company

=== Interactive Entertainment ===
- **Ian Livingstone** OBE, fantasy writer, co-founder of Games Workshop
- Sam Houser, video game developer, co-founder of Rockstar Games
- Richard and David Darling, video game developers, founders of Codemasters

=== Special recognition ===
- **Michael Eavis** CBE, farmer, founder of Glastonbury Festival
- Sir David Attenborough (see Television)
- Sir Richard Branson (see Innovation)
- Dame Vivienne Westwood DBE, fashion designer

== See also ==
- List of fashion awards
- List of computer-related awards
