= Selina Juul =

Russian-Danish activist and graphic designer

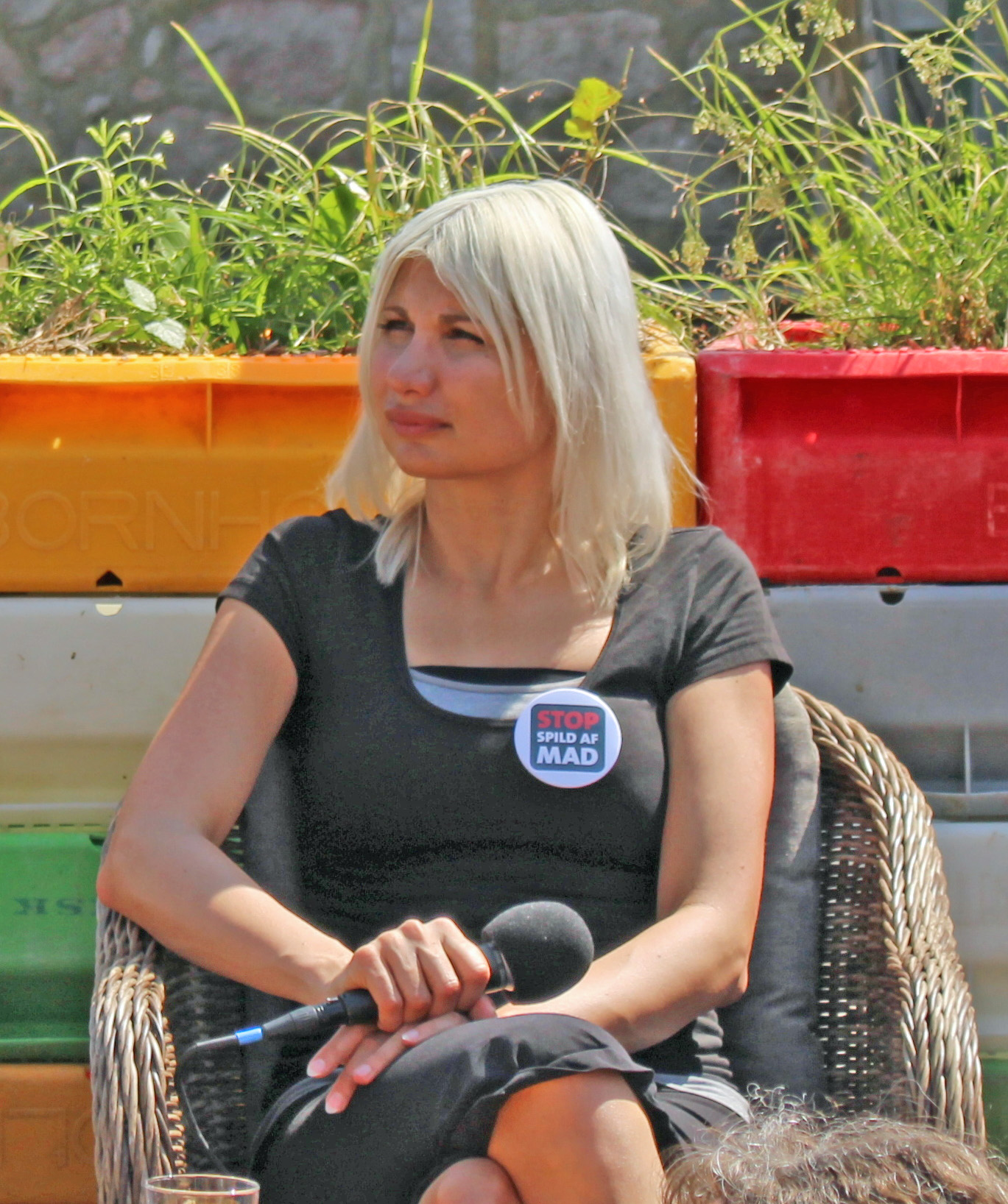
- Selina Juul in 2015
- Born: March 7, 1980 (age 46); Moscow, Soviet Union
- Education: Danish School of Media and Journalism
- Occupation: Food waste activist
- Website: http://www.selinajuul.com/

Selina Juul (born 7 March 1980 in Moscow, Soviet Union) is a Russian-Danish activist and graphic designer known for her work in promoting the reduction of food waste. She founded the consumer organization Stop Wasting Food (Danish: Stop Spild af Mad) in 2008. She wrote the cookbook Stop spild af mad: En kogebog med mere (Stop Wasting Food: A Cookbook with More) in 2011 and has written numerous articles on the subject of food waste. In addition to her activism, she worked as a graphic designer and illustrator.

== Early life and education ==
Selina Juul has a BA from the Danish School of Media and Journalism (formerly known as the Graphic Arts Institute of Denmark).

== Activism ==
Her experiences with food shortages as a child in Russia during the 1980s inspired her work combating food waste. Due to the work of the Stop Wasting Food campaign, Denmark reduced its food waste nationally by 25% in 5 years (2010-2015).

Selina Juul has received several awards for her activism. In 2013, she won the Nordic Council Environment Prize and the Danish Social Democrats' Svend Auken Prize. In 2014, she was named Dane of the Year (Danish: Årets Dansker) by the newspaper Berlingske. She blogs for The Huffington Post and the Danish newspaper Politiken.
