= Synaptic pharmacology =

Study of drugs acting on synapses

Synaptic pharmacology is the study of drugs that act on the synapses. It deals with the composition, uses, and effects of drugs that may enhance (receptor) or diminish (blocker) activity at the synapse, which is the junction across which a nerve impulse passes from an axon terminal to a neuron, muscle cell, or gland cell.

A partial list of pharmacological agents that act at synapses follows.

Synaptic pharmacology
Channel, Receptor, or Phenomenon	Antagonist or Blocker
adenosine	DCPGX, ZM241385, anoxinine
AMPA-R	NBQX
AMPA-R desensitization	cyclothiazide (CTZ)
cannabinoid	AM-251
GABA_{A}	bicuculline, gabazine
GABA_{B}	CGP-54626
glycine	strychnine
kainate R	..
metabotropic GluR, broad	MCPG, pertussis toxin, NEM
muscarinic AChR	atropine, Scopolamine
nicotinic AChR	bungarotoxin, curare, DhBe
NMDA-R	APV
