= RePack =

Packaging service

- Type: Private
- Industry: Packaging Industry
- Founded: 2011
- Headquarters: Helsinki, Finland
- Key people: Jonne Hellgren, CEO; Peter Peltonen, COO
- Website: www.repack.com

RePack is a packaging service which enables the return and reuse of delivery packaging for online retailers and their users. The service and packaging is designed by Original RePack Oy, a Finnish company focused on sustainable products and business model solutions.

== Overview ==
On supported e-commerce sites, the customer can select to use RePack as the online order's delivery packaging. The customer will then receive the goods in RePack's recyclable packaging. This packaging can be returned to RePack by dropping it into a local letterbox.

The return rate of RePack's products has reached 95%. RePack is used by over 200 online retailers in Europe and the US.

== Awards ==
- In October 2013, RePack was awarded the Pactec 2013 innovation prize by the Finnish packaging association.
- In January 2014, RePack was awarded the Fennia Prize.
- In September 2014, RePack won the Green Alley startup competition in Germany.
- In November 2014, RePack finished fourth in Slush 100's pitching competition for startups.
- In November 2017, the company was awarded the Nordic Council Environment Prize.

== See also ==
- Huhtamäki
- Stora Enso
