= Design Forum Finland =

Finnish nonprofit organization

Design Forum Finland is a non-profit organisation that promotes the strategic use of design and Finnish design. It is maintained by the Finnish Society of Crafts and Design, which was founded in 1875. The organisation works to support the growth, international competitiveness and development of Finnish companies and organisations by promoting the use of design in business.

From 2023 to 2026, the association has focused on increasing circular design expertise in Finnish companies. Activities related to this theme have been funded by several Finnish ministries. They have included a one-year Circular Design training programme for 50 companies from different sectors, funded by the Ministry of the Environment; the Circular Design for Business online course for designers, funded by the Ministry of Education and Culture; and a Circular Design guidebook, funded by the Ministry of Economic Affairs and Employment. The guidebook was written in collaboration with Ville Tikka.

In 2025, the association celebrated its 150th anniversary. As part of its Growth and Competitiveness through Design campaign, it awarded scholarships to three Finnish business leaders to attend Stanford University’s Design Thinking Bootcamp. President of the Republic Alexander Stubb served as patron of the anniversary year.

Since 2025, Design Forum Finland has represented the design sector in the Creative Economy Advisory Board. Since 2026, it has also participated in the Team Finland network’s sector team for high value-added services, consumer business and creative industries.

Design Forum Finland publishes Design Finland Media in cooperation with Marketing Finland. The online publication began operating in 2026 as a pilot. It focuses on marketing, commercialisation and design. The editor-in-chief is Paula Harmaala.

== Earlier Activities ==
=== Design Forum Shop and exhibition space ===
First shop and exhibition space operated at Fabianinkatu 10 in Helsinki from 1991 to 2000. In 2000, the activities moved to Sanomatalo. The organisation’s last exhibition and shop space operated at Erottajankatu 7 from 2004 to 2014.

=== Other Exhibitions ===
Some samples of earlier projects

- Suomi Muotoilee exhibitions, Museum of Art and Design, Helsinki, 1979–1993
- Year of Design, 2005
- Hirameki Design x Finland, Tokyo, 2010
- Everyday Discoveries exhibition, organised as part of World Design Capital Helsinki, Suvilahti, Helsinki, 2012

=== DFF awards from 1990 to 2022 ===
- Kaj Franck Design Price, 1992-2022
- Fennia Prize, 2001-2022
- Young designer of the Year, 2000-2022
- Estlander medal, from 2000
- Pro Finnish Design, 1990-2001

== See also ==
- Scandinavian design
