= Juho Hyvönen =

Finnish politician

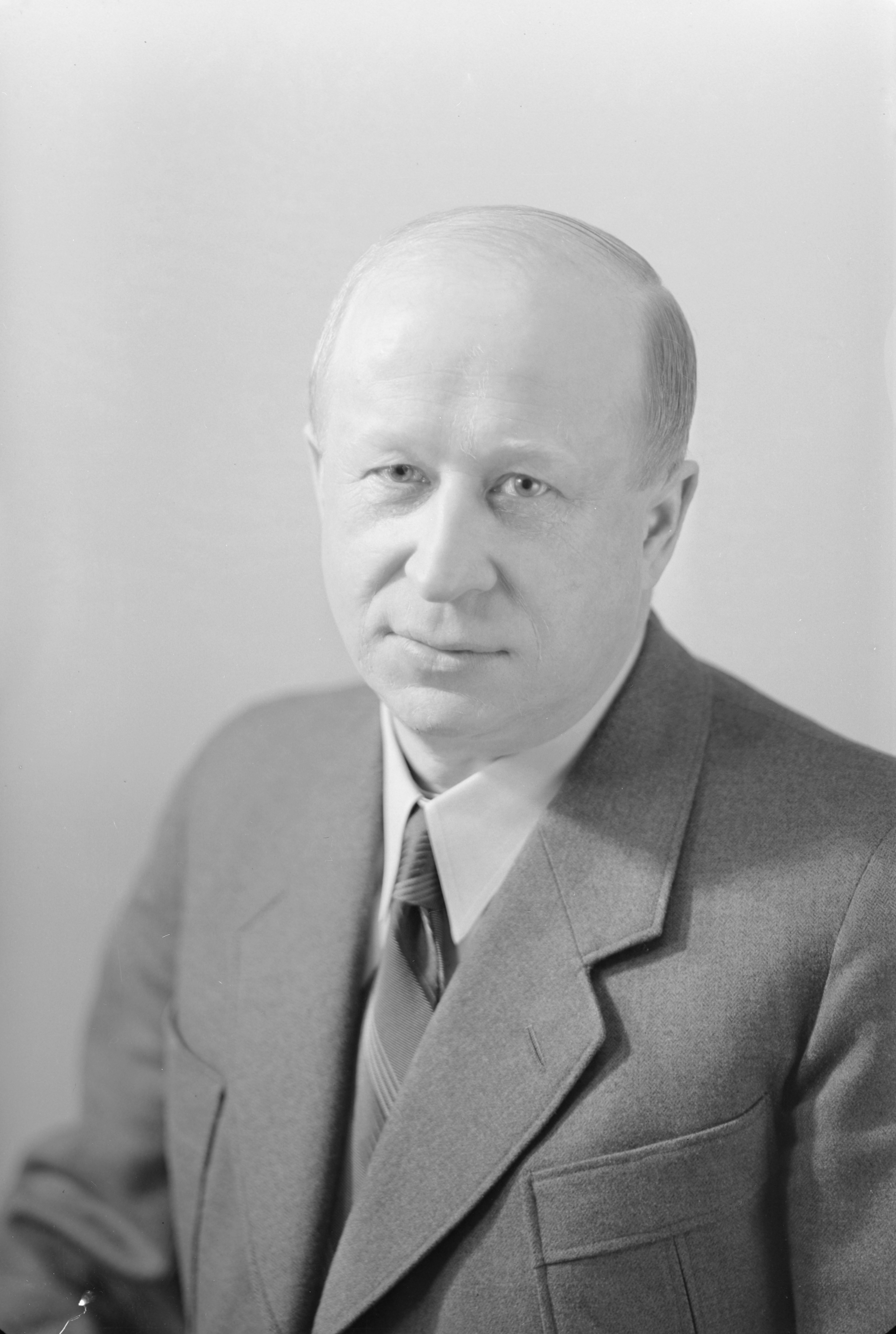
Juho Hyvönen in 1938.

Johan David (Juho Taavetti) Hyvönen (14 February 1891, in Virtasalmi – 29 January 1975) was a Finnish lawyer, civil servant and politician. He was a member of the Parliament of Finland from 1922 to 1924, representing the Agrarian League.
