= American Prize for Design =

Annual award

The American Prize for Design
- Description: Recognition of excellence and innovation in industrial and graphic design
- Country: United States
- Presented by: Chicago Athenaeum / European Centre for Architecture Art Design and Urban Studies

The American Prize for Design was established in 2016 and is awarded annually by the Chicago Athenaeum Museum of Architecture and Design in collaboration with the European Centre for Architecture Art Design and Urban Studies within the context of the Good Design Awards. The prize is presented to a distinguished designer in the fields of industrial design, visual communication and graphic design in terms of excellence and further innovation along with the contribution of design in the quality of everyday life.

== Recipients ==
Past recipients include Gorden Wagener, Mercedes-Benz Chief Designer and Executive Vice President at Daimler AG (2016), Sir Norman Foster (2018), Flavio Manzoni (2019), Karim Rashid (2020), Mauro Porcini, Chief Design Officer at PepsiCo (2022), Stacy Wolff, Head of Design and Sustainability at HP Inc (2023), and Paolo Pininfarina, Chairman of Pininfarina SpA (2024).
