= Fashion Is for Every Body =

American nonprofit organization

Fashion Is For Every Body
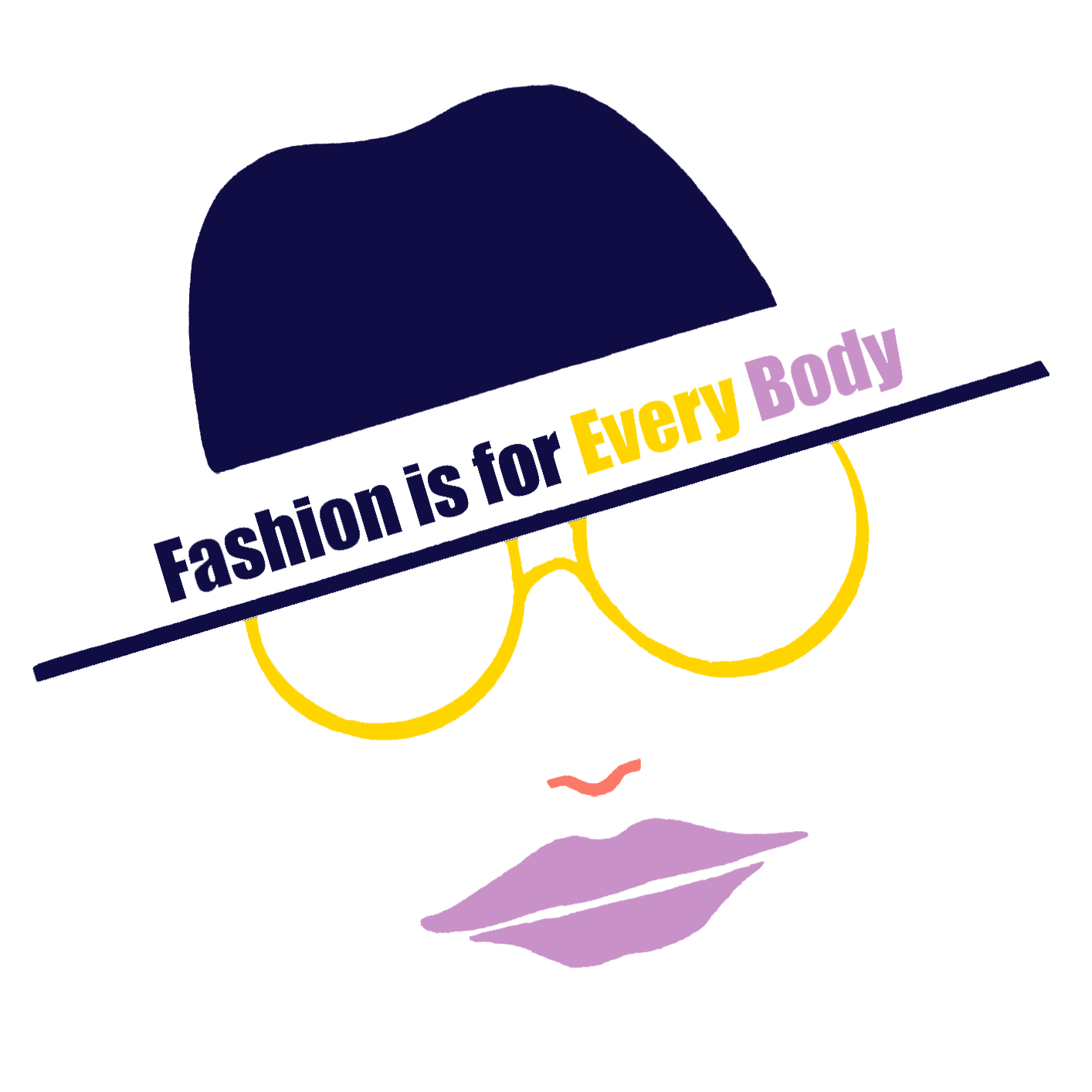
- Formation: 2016; 10 years ago
- Founder: Alicia Searcy
- Type: Nonprofit
- Legal status: Nonprofit organization
- Purpose: To encourage interaction and inclusion versus segregation and exclusion in fashion
- Location: Nashville, Tennessee
- Fields: Fashion
- Website: fashionisforeverybody.com

Fashion Is For Every Body (FIFEB), founded in 2016 by disabled fashion blogger Alicia Searcy, is a 501(c)(3) organization headquartered in Nashville, Tennessee. The organization promotes inclusivity in the fashion industry by hosting runway shows, events, and interactive fashion opportunities in the community.

== History ==
In 2017, Boundless was the first inclusive fashion event FIFEB produced, casting models of varying abilities, gender identities, sizes and races.

== Runway shows ==
Year	Fashion Designer(s)
2017	Opium Vintage, Sue Surdi Designs, Cat-Land Forever Couture, Ola Mai and Lilly Guilder
2018	A Lady of the Lake, Eric Adler, Black by Maria Silver and Any Old Iron
2019	
2021	Any Old Iron, Suzanne Wade
2022	Article X, A Lady of the Lake, Laura Citron, Any Old Iron's Andrew Clancey, Dahlia, Unhidden
2023	
