= IED Design Awards =

Spanish design awards

- Description: Honoring excellence and creativity in design and innovation
- Country: Spain (Madrid)
- Presented by: Istituto Europeo di Design (IED Madrid)
- Website: http://iedesignawards.com/

The IED Design Awards consist of an awards gala organized by the Madrid headquarters of the Istituto Europeo di Design since 2016, whose purpose is to honor all those people and projects that stand out within the design world. Encompassing everything ranging from brands, professionals, entrepreneurs and to even groups, the IED presents awards every year to diverse projects and initiatives, raising awareness and promoting them, recognizing their importance and quality, and highlighting the value of design and creativity.

== History ==
The awards take place on a ceremony that, since 2017, has been held in the Italian Embassy in Madrid. The finalists and winners are chosen by a committee of experts madep up of outstanding professionals from the design world and members of the management team of the different IED schools in Madrid.

The IED Design Awards include over 18 categories, encompassing the fashion world, interior design, digital design, product design, graphic design and process design, among others.

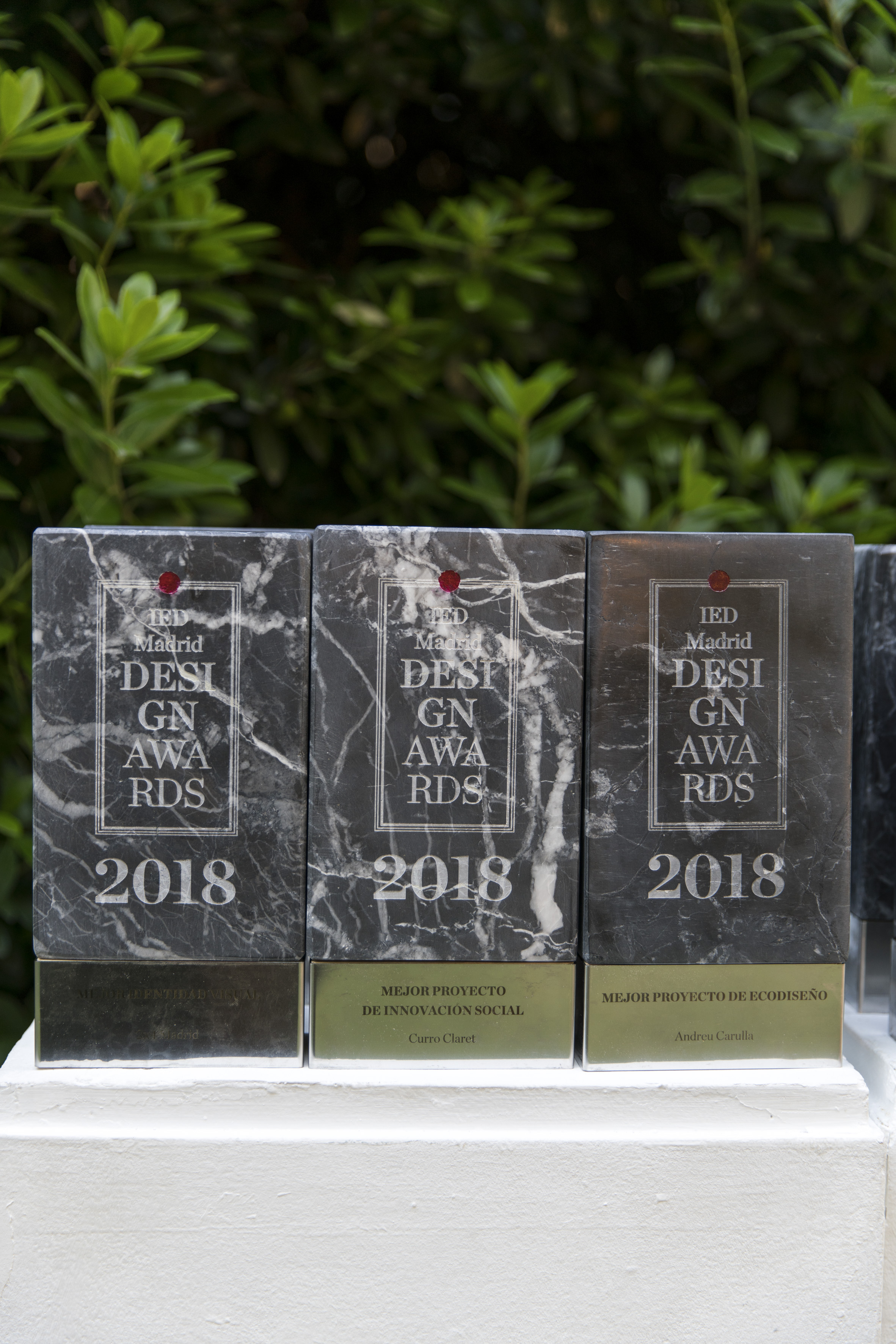
An image of IED Design Awards trophies

In 2018, the Honorific Award category was added, in order to pay homage to the career of an exceptional professional from the design field. In 2018, the award was granted to the publicist Toni Segarra, who is considered to be the 'best creative of the 20th Century'. At the 2019 edition, the British fashion designer, Katharine Hamnett, was awarded the honor for her outstanding career and her pioneering activism in favor of the sustainability of the fashion industry, which started over 30 years ago.

== Awards ==
=== 2016 ===
The ceremony took place the 20th of May 2016 at the Aula Magna of IED Madrid, and was hosted by Patricia Conde.

Category	Winner
Best contemporary jewelry project	Helena Rohner
Best sustainable fashion project	Ecoalf
Best I+D+i in design	Decathlon
Best product design	Samsung Galaxy S7

=== 2017 ===
The ceremony took place on 15 June in the Italian Embassy in Spain, and was hosted by the actress and model Laura Sánchez. The ceremony also featured the presence of the Italian ambassador, Stefano Sannino

Category	Winner
Best interior design	Hotel Gran Meliá Palacio de los Duques
Best product design	Dyson
Best accessories brand	Hannibal Laguna
Best contemporary jewelry project	Aristocrazy
Best branding	Xbox One S - Microsoft

=== 2018 ===
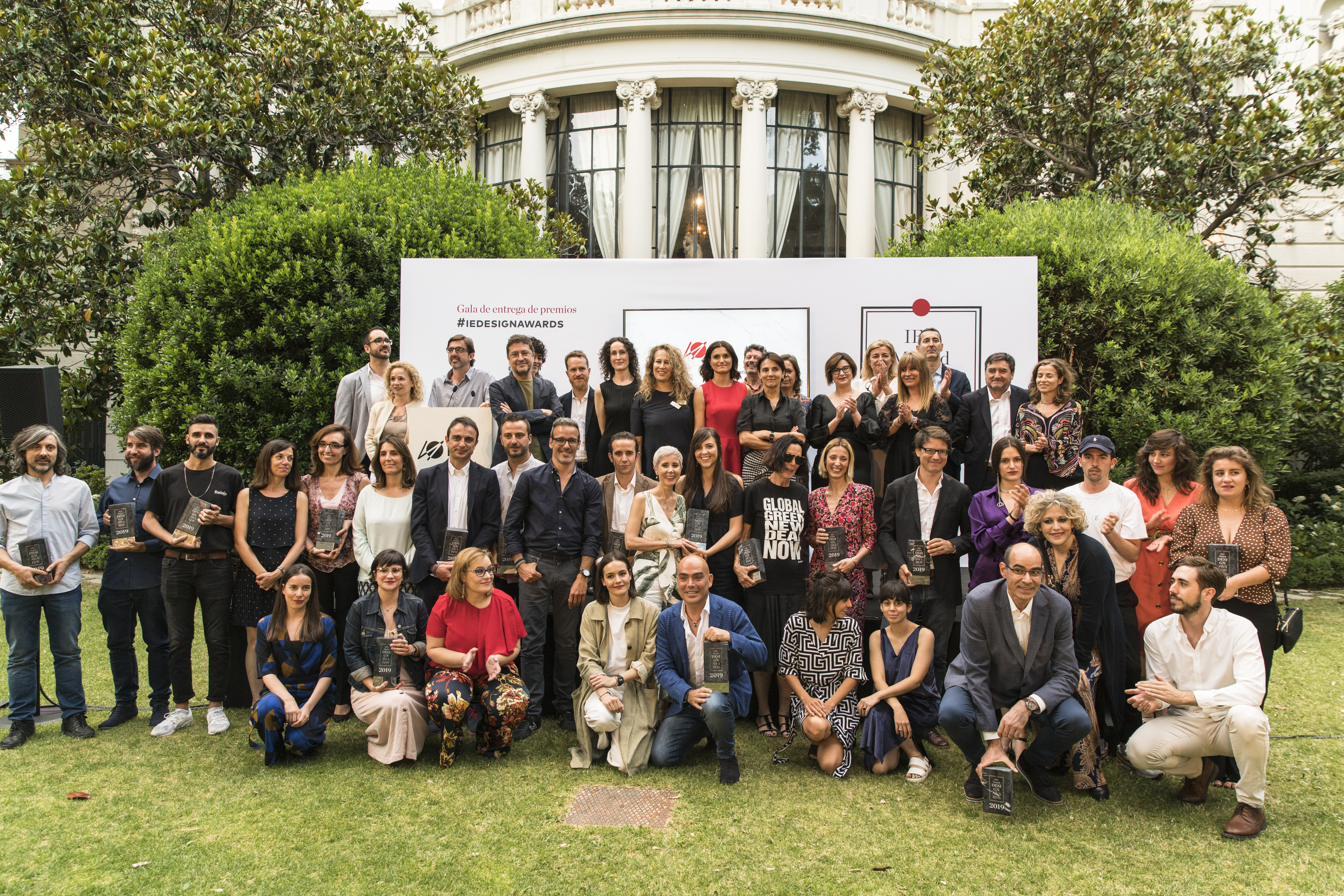
Group photo of IED Design Awards 2019 winners

The ceremony, held on 21 June in the gardens of the Italian Embassy in Spain, would once again feature the presence of the Italian Ambassador. The journalist and presenter Sandra Barnerda, was responsible for hosting this ceremony.

Category	Winner
Best contemporary jewelry project	ANDRESGALLARDO
Best sustainable fashion project	Jeanologia
Best ecodesign project	ROCA RECICLA for the Celler of Can Roca - Andreu Carulla
Best professional career	Toni Segarra

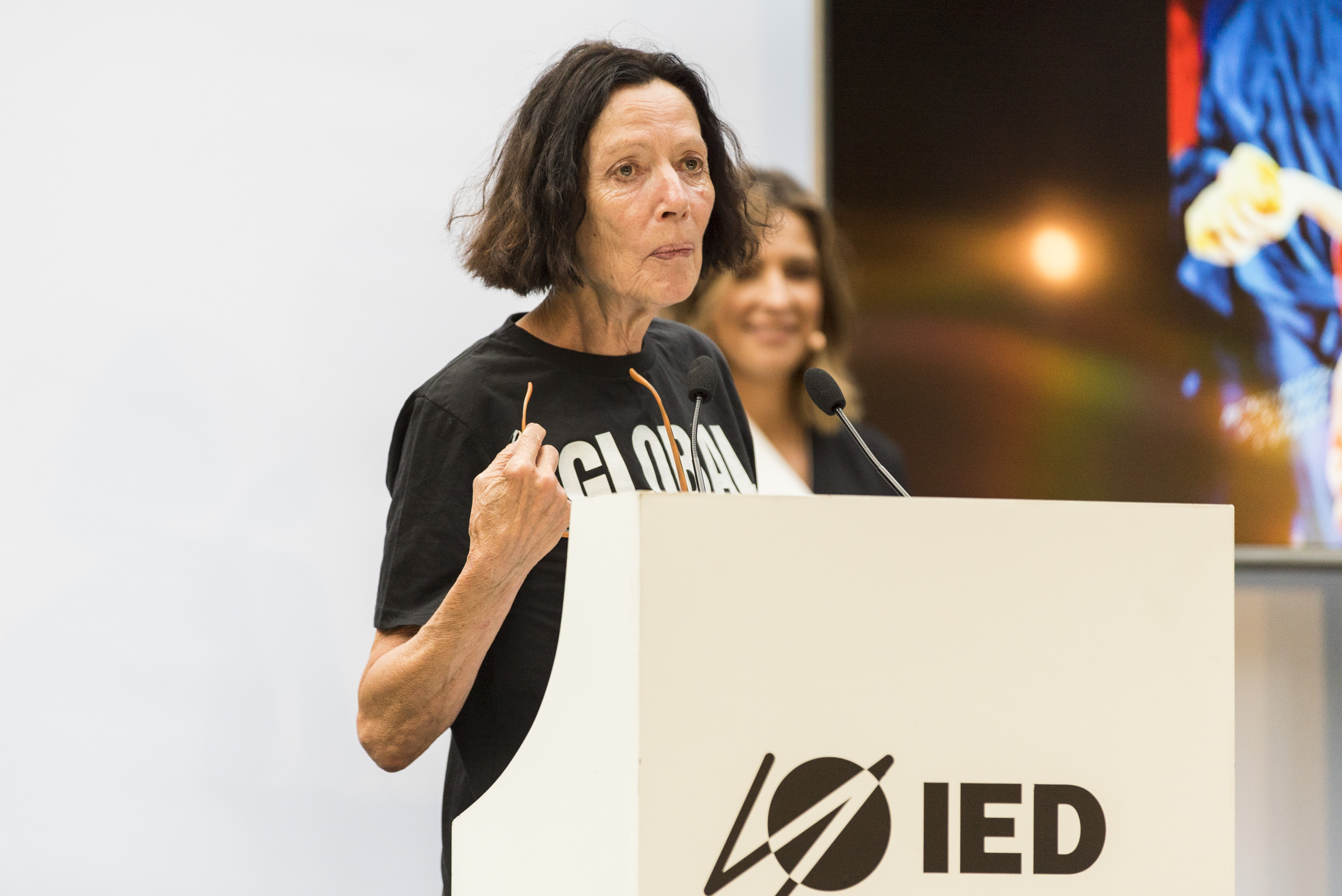
Katharine Hamnett, honorary award on IED Design Awards 2019, during her acceptance speech

=== 2019 ===
The ceremony was held on 20 June in the gardens of the Italian Embassy in Spain. Sandra Barneda once again hosted the ceremony.

Category	Winner
Best digital design	Reina Sofia Museum for 'Repensar el Guernica' (Rethink the Guernica)
Best product design	Álvaro Catalán de Ocón
Best interior design	Room Mate Hotels
Best ecodesign project	Coca-Cola for the project 'Mares circulares' (circular seas)
Best creative direction for fashion	Pepa Salazar
Best sustainable fashion	Inditex, Join Life
Honorific Award	Katharine Hamnett

== See also ==
- List of fashion awards

== Bibliography ==
- Geach, P.T. (1976). Reason and Argument. Oxford.
