= ETypes =

eTypes
- Type: Private
- Industry: Strategic design Logo design Branding; Communication; Digital design Interactive design Instructional design Design research
- Founded: 1997
- Headquarters: Copenhagen, Denmark
- Key people: Rasmus Drucker Ibfelt; Mads Elleberg Petersen; Jonas Hecksher; Gertrud Hejgaard Wiik; Kristian Bøjlund; Frederikke Rindom
- Number of employees: 55 (2025)
- Website: www.e-types.com

eTypes is a branding agency based in Copenhagen. It employs 50 designers, strategists and account managers. Since 2006 eTypes has been subject to academic research by scholars from Copenhagen Business School and Harvard Business School.

== History ==
e-Types was founded in Vesterbro, Copenhagen, in 1997 by a team of young graphic designers. Over the past decade e-Types has developed from a business of five employees into a consultancy of 50 strategists, designers and account managers. In 2010 e-Types became part of e-Types Group. In 2025 e-Types changed their name to eTypes.

The company's branding work includes Danish Film Institute (1999), Aquascutum (2002), Rzeczpospolita (2004), Royal Danish Theatre (2005), 3XN (2007), CPH:PIX (2008), DI (2008), Tryg (2010), Berlingske (2011), Sanoma (2013).

== Design philosophy ==
eTypes designs projects through three separate methods: digitally, spatially, and print. Designers confer less with consumers during the design process than other graphic design agencies, resulting in a more hands-off design philosophy. They have done work both locally and internationally.

== Academia ==
By 2006, e-Types became an object of interest to scholars in the creative businesses academia. The cooperation with Learning Lab Denmark turned into an industrial PhD from The Danish School of Education (now University of Aarhus) using e-Types as the primary case of the research. The focus was "Conscious Design Practice as a Strategic Tool". Meanwhile, Professor Robert Austin from Harvard Business School made a different case-study concerning Innovation Strategy of a Design Firm. The case-study was discussed and criticised at the 2006 Seattle Innovation Symposium at the University of Washington.
