= Stop Wasting Food =

Stop Wasting Food (Danish: Stop Spild af Mad) is a Danish consumer organization that works for the reduction of food waste in society. It was established in 2008 by Selina Juul, who acts as the movement's day-to-day leader and spokesperson. The organization is run by volunteers and does not count on a permanent membership.

The goal of Stop Wasting Food is to spread the message that it is economically irresponsible to dispose of edible food at any point in the food-production chain, from producers to shops and restaurants to homes. The Danish Agriculture and Food Council has estimated that Denmark wastes over 700,000 tons of food annually, at a cost of DKK 11.6 billion.

Stop Wasting Food, and its spokesperson Selina Juul, has received support from Danish politicians such as Eva Kjer Hansen, Poul Nyrup Rasmussen, Ritt Bjerregaard, Connie Hedegaard, Bertel Haarder, Frank Jensen, Dan Jørgensen, Karen Ellemann, Henrik Høegh and Kirsten Brosbøl, as well as food industry figures such as Rema 1000 and Coop Danmark.

In part due to the Stop Wasting Food movement, Denmark was able to reduce its food waste by 25% in the five-year period of 2010–2015.
