= Monique van Heist =

Dutch fashion designer

Monique Van Heist
- Born: 11 May 1972; Haarsteeg, Netherlands
- Education: ArtEZ in Arnhem
- Occupation: Fashion designer
- Labels: Moniquevanheist; Hellofashion
- Website: www.moniquevanheist.com

Monique van Heist (Haarsteeg, 11 May 1972) is a Rotterdam-based Dutch fashion designer. Heist mainly focusses on women’s wear and unisex wardrobe pieces. Some of her fashion lines are available for long periods of time.

In 2003 she studied at the ArtEZ Institute of the Arts in Arnhem and graduated in 2004. In 2009 she presented one of her fashion lines in a dimly lit gay bar in Amsterdam using ordinary people as clothing models.
