= Paustian =

Paustian is a German language surname. It stems from the male given name Sebastian. Notable people with the surname include:

- Matthias O. Paustian, German economist
- Ole Paustian (born 1937), Danish rower
- Peter Paustian, German rower
- Ross Paustian (born 1956), American politician
- Samantha Paustian-Underdahl, American psychologist
- Timothy D. Paustian, American microbiologist
