= Industrial Design Council of Australia =

- Successor: Australian Design Council
- Formation: 1958; 68 years ago

The Industrial Design Council of Australia (IDCA) was established in 1958 and later became known as the Australian Design Council and then the Australian Design Awards. For over five decades this organisation has been the most active body promoting industrial design in Australia.

Products of Australian industry, designed in Australia, were selected to carry the 'Good Design label' of the Industrial Design Council of Australia. In 1968, there were 250 products carrying the label. When products were submitted to evaluation panels for consideration for labelling, criteria included the general standard of manufacture, suitability of materials, durability, construction, comfort in use (and safety), and overall external appearance.

== See also ==
- Australian Design Award
