= Fennia Prize =

- Description: Recognizing comprehensive use of design in Finnish business
- Country: Finland
- Presented by: Design Forum Finland & Fennia Group

The Fennia Prize is a Finnish design award. The purpose of the Fennia Prize is to present well-designed products and to encourage firms and companies to apply design in a comprehensive and interactive manner in product development, manufacturing and the corporate image. The prize has been awarded since 2003. The Fennia Prize is awarded as a part of the Fennia Prize – Good design grows global competition.

The prize is awarded every second year to a firm or company. In the competition, there are two series: Product Design Series and Open Series, including, for example, business and service concepts and environments. The prize-winning products are presented to the public at the Fennia Prize exhibition.

Design Forum Finland and the Fennia Group are the organizing bodies of the Fennia Prize - Good design grows global competition. The money for the prizes is donated by the Fennia Group. Design Forum is responsible for the realization of the competition and the related exhibition.

1990-2001 a similar competition was arranged under the title Pro Finnish Design.

== Fennia Prize winners ==
Year	Winner(s)	Winning product / concept	Note
2003	Rukka / L-Fashion Group	SRO motorcycle outfit	
2005	Lappset Group Oy	Axiom playground equipment	
2007	PlusArkkitehdit	PlusHuvilat business concept	Fennia Prize 5000 €
	PaloDEx Group (Instrumentarium Dental)	Orthopantomograph OP200 x-ray equipment	Fennia Prize 5000 €
	Huonekalutehdas Korhonen	Flip line of furniture	Fennia Prize 5000 €
	Halti	Gompa and Fiber jackets and Green backpack	Fennia Prize 5000 €
	Rocla	Humanic reach truck	Fennia Prize Grand Prix 15 000 €
2009	Saas Instruments	Medusa lamp	Fennia Prize 5000 €
	Polar Electro Oy	FT80 training computer	Fennia Prize 5000 €
	Metso Automation Oy	kajaaniPaperLab automatic paper testing unit	Fennia Prize 5000 €
	Iittala / Iittala Group Oy Ab	Fireplace table fireplace	Fennia Prize 5000 €
	Genelec Oy	5040A active subwoofer	Fennia Prize Grand Prix 15 000 €
2012	Tulikivi Oyj	Nuoska sauna stove	Fennia Prize, €5000
	Konecranes	Smarter Cabin crane cabin	Fennia Prize, €5000
	Kekkilä Oy	Home & Garden product concept	Fennia Prize, €5000
	City of Helsinki	Helsinki City Library, service and spatial concept	Fennia Prize, €5000
	Fingrid Oy	Transmission tower for field locations	Fennia Prize Grand Prix, 15 €000
2014	Wärtsilä Corporation	The New Generation of Wärtsilä Four-stroke Engine	Fennia Prize €5000
	Plan B From Outer Space Oy	RePack packaging	Fennia Prize €5000
	Nokia Corporation	Nokia Lumia product family	Fennia Prize 5000 €
	Jalo Helsinki Oy	Kupu smoke alarm	Fennia Prize, 5000 €
	Ponsse Plc	Ponsse Scorpion Harvester	Fennia Prize Grand Prix, 15 €000
