= Danish Design Center =

Denmark's national center for design

Coordinates: 55.6721°N 12.5790°E

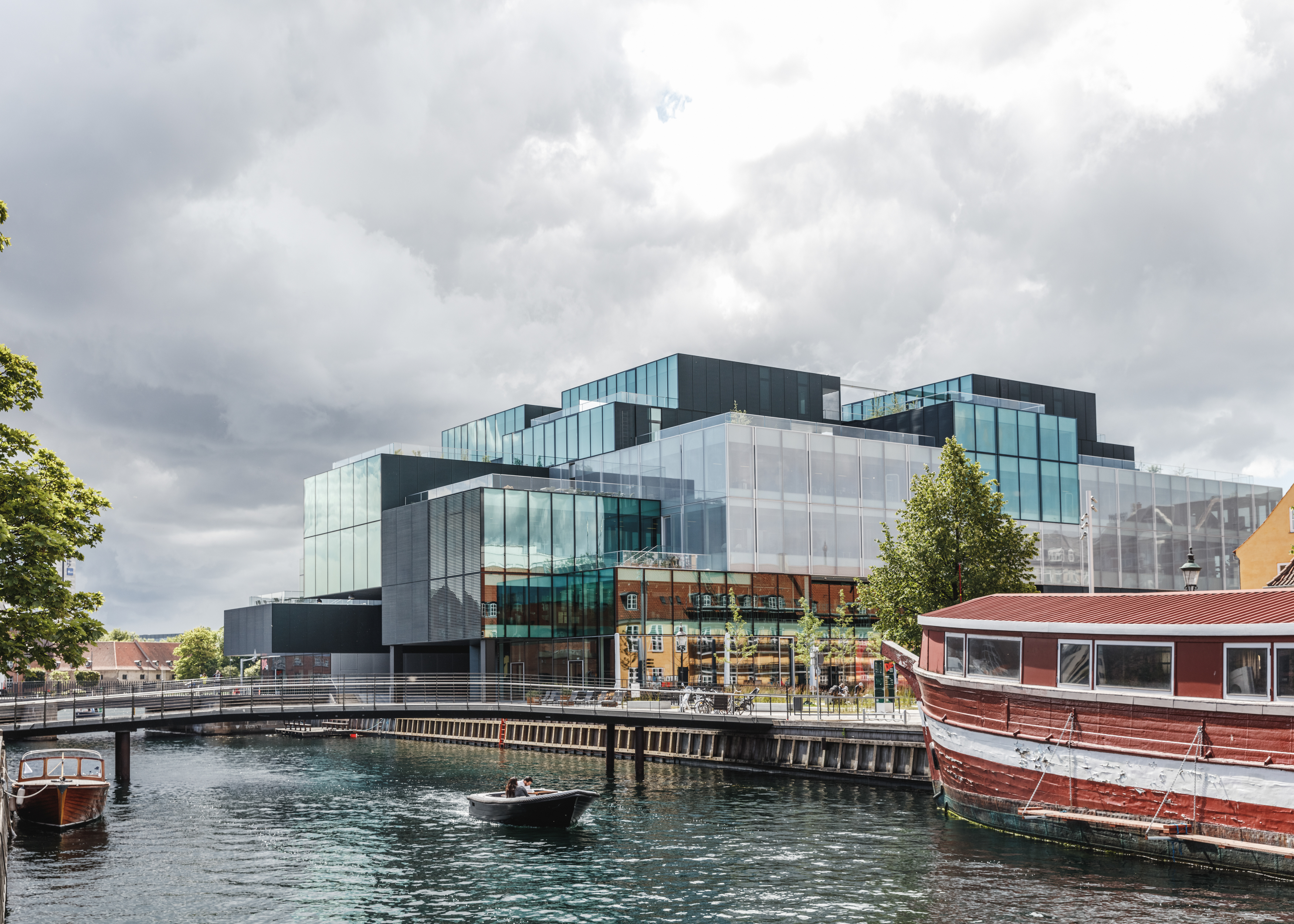
BLOX in Copenhagen, home of the Danish Design Centre

The Danish Design Center (DDC) is Denmark's national center for design. Established in 1978, DDC is a non-profit foundation under the Danish Ministry of Business, Industry and Financial Affairs. The role of DDC is to promote the use of design in business and industry, help professionalise the design industry, and document, promote and brand Danish design in Denmark and abroad.

The Danish Design Center is rooted in Denmark's design history and in the values of Danish design but is oriented towards the future. It is the vision of DDC to use design as a method and mindset to solve some of society's greatest challenges, particularly within the green, social and digital transitions.

The Danish Design Center is located in BLOX, a hub for design, architecture and urban innovation in Copenhagen, and the CEO is Christian Bason.
