= Lunning Prize =

Prize awarded to Scandinavian Designers

- Description: Prestigious award for eminent Scandinavian designers (1951–1970)
- Country: Denmark, Finland, Norway, Sweden
- Presented by: Frederik Lunning (Georg Jensen Inc., New York)

The Lunning Prize was instituted by Frederik Lunning, owner of Georg Jensen Inc. (New York City) the New York agency for Georg Jensen. The prize was awarded to eminent Scandinavian designers, two each year, from 1951 to 1970. The recipients were selected by a group of peers from Denmark, Finland, Norway and Sweden.

The Lunning Prize and its recipients were instrumental in establishing the concept and profile of Scandinavian Design, both at home and abroad, during this vital period.

== Recipients ==
1951
- Hans J. Wegner, Denmark
- Tapio Wirkkala, Finland
1952
- Carl-Axel Acking, Sweden
- Grete Prytz Kittelsen, Norway
1953
- Tias Eckhoff, Norway
- Henning Koppel, Denmark
1954
- Ingeborg Lundin, Sweden
- Jens Harald Quistgaard, Denmark
1955
- Ingrid Dessau, Sweden
- Kaj Franck, Finland
1956
- Jørgen and Nanna Ditzel, Denmark
- Timo Sarpaneva, Finland
1957
- Hermann Bongard, Norway
- Erik Höglund, Sweden
1958
- Poul Kjærholm, Denmark
- Signe Persson-Melin, Sweden
1959
- Arne Jon Jutrem, Norway
- Antti Nurmesniemi, Finland
1960
- Vivianna Torun Bülow-Hübe, Sweden
- Vibeke Klint, Denmark
1961
- Bertel Gardberg, Finland
- Erik Pløen, Norway
1962
- Hertha Hillfon, Sweden
- Kristian Solmer Vedel, Denmark
1963
- Karin Björquist, Sweden
- Börje Rajalin, Finland
1964
- Vuokko Eskolin-Nurmesniemi, Finland
- Bent Gabrielsen, Denmark
1965
- Eli-Marie Johnsen, Norway
- Hans Krondahl, Sweden
1966
- Gunnar Cyrén, Sweden
- Yrjö Kukkapuro, Finland
1967
- Erik Magnussen, Denmark
- Kirsti Skintveit, Norway
1968
- Björn Weckström, Finland
- Ann and Göran Wärff, Sweden
1969
- Helga and Bent Exner, Denmark
- Bo Lindekrantz and Börge Lindau, Sweden
1970
- Kim Naver, Denmark
- Oiva Toikka, Finland
