= Nobel Banquet =

Annual banquet after the Nobel Prize ceremony

Nobel Banquet Nobelfesten
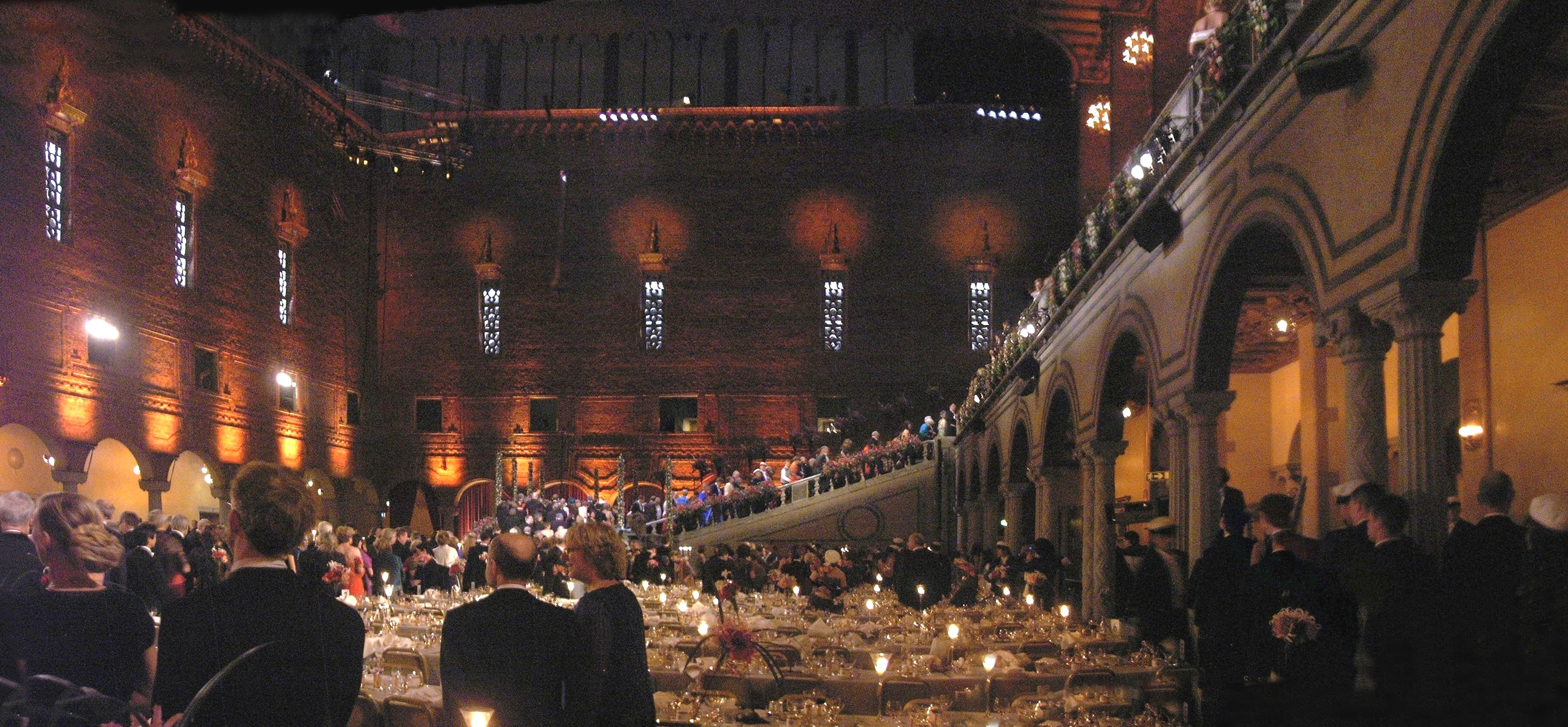
- 2005 Nobel Banquet
- Nickname: Festernas fest ("The feast of feasts")
- Genre: Banquet
- Date: 10 December
- Frequency: Annual
- Venue: Blue Hall, Stockholm City Hall
- Locations: Stockholm, Sweden
- Country: Sweden
- Inaugurated: 10 December 1901; 124 years ago

The Nobel Banquet (Swedish: Nobelfesten) is an annual banquet held on 10 December (the anniversary of Alfred Nobel's death) in the Blue Hall of Stockholm City Hall, after the Nobel Prize ceremony. At the banquet, for which a formal dress code exists, a multi-course dinner is served and entertainment provided. After the dinner, a dance is held in the Golden Hall. The event is broadcast live on Sveriges Television (SVT) with generally high ratings.

== Overview ==
The Nobel Banquet, organized by the Nobel Foundation, is a formal dinner held after the Nobel Prize award ceremony and as part of a wider series of events celebrating the Nobel Prize laureates on 10 December (the death anniversary of Swedish inventor Alfred Nobel), with the Nobel lectures and the Nobel Prize Concert occurring prior. Held inside the Blue Hall at Stockholm City Hall, the banquet hosts approximately 1,300 guests. Up to 88 guests of honor (including the laureates and their spouses or partners, together with the Swedish royal family) are seated at the table of honor, located in the middle of the Blue Hall and decorated with flowers provided by the Italian municipality of Sanremo (where Alfred Nobel spent the final years of his life); the other guests sit across multiple tables surrounding the table of honour and throughout the City Hall. During the banquet, artistic interludes called divertissements (French for 'diversions' / 'entertainments') are performed by Swedish performing arts talent, and can range from music and dance performances to theatrical presentations and (in the case of the 2002 banquet) even circus acts; these performances (and the floral arrangements of the banquet) are connected by a unique theme or narrative that defines the banquet each year. After the banquet proper, guests can dance inside the Golden Hall.

=== Programme ===
Guests are welcomed into the Blue Hall and requested to take their seats around 30 minutes before 19:00, when the guests of honour march in procession to an organ and trumpet fanfare. Three minutes after the guests of honour have taken their seats, a toastmaster or toastmadame (a Swedish university/college student) calls for two ceremonial toasts; a toast for the Swedish monarch made by the chairperson of the Nobel Foundation, and a toast made by the monarch in memory of Alfred Nobel. The first divertissement is performed before the starter course is served at around 19:30, with the same for the second divertissement before the main course at about 20:30 to 20:40. Both the first two divertissements are preceded by a four-minute photo opportunity at the table of honour. Two more divertissements follow, with the fourth and final divertissement coinciding with a dessert parade at around 21:45. At about 22:30, students from Swedish universities and colleges assemble with the flags and standards of student unions at the Blue Hall's grand stairway and balustrade, and the toastmaster or toastmadame calls a laureate from each prize category (in the order that Alfred Nobel listed the prizes in his will; namely Physics, Chemistry, Physiology or Medicine, Literature, and Economics) to the podium for an acceptance speech. A signal is given at around 23:00 for when the guests can rise from the table.

=== Guest list ===
The Nobel Banquet accommodates approximately 1,300 guests, including Nobel Prize laureates, each of whom can bring a significant other and up to 14 additional invitees; other attendees include members of the Swedish royal family, members of the Nobel Foundation, politicians, representatives from cultural and commercial organizations associated with the Nobel Prize or related fields, diplomats and ambassadors, select international guests, and other prominent figures in Swedish society invited by the Nobel Foundation. Since 1976, students from Swedish universities and colleges, selected through a ticket raffle limited to student union members, have been seated in the same hall as the guests of honor.

The Swedish royal family maintains a significant presence at the event; the Crown Prince is among the regular guests from the first banquet, and the monarch of Sweden first took part in 1951. Women were first welcomed as guests in 1903, as well as children in 1948. Anniversary banquets held in 1975 (marking the 75th anniversary of the Nobel Foundation), 1991 (the 90th anniversary of the Nobel Prize), and 2001 (the centennial of the Nobel Prize) were attended by all then-living Nobel laureates. The Nobel Foundation maintains a policy of excluding individuals whose values it deems inconsistent with the principles of the Nobel Prize; for example, the leader of the Sweden Democrats has been regularly excluded from the banquet, as have diplomatic representatives of Russia and Belarus following the Russian invasion of Ukraine in 2022.

=== Etiquette ===
As a highly prestigious event, the Nobel Banquet is considered a prominent display of Swedish etiquette (Swedish: etikett); for example:

- Guests are seated in an alternating male-female-male-female pattern and are not seated next to their spouse or other family members.
- Men are expected to wear white tie and tails, often with decorations if awarded. Women are to wear evening gowns, although the suitability of women's attire has occasionally been a subject of public discussion, such as how low should a neckline be.
- Guests are expected to refrain from eating, drinking, or conversing during the laureates' speeches.

== Cuisine ==
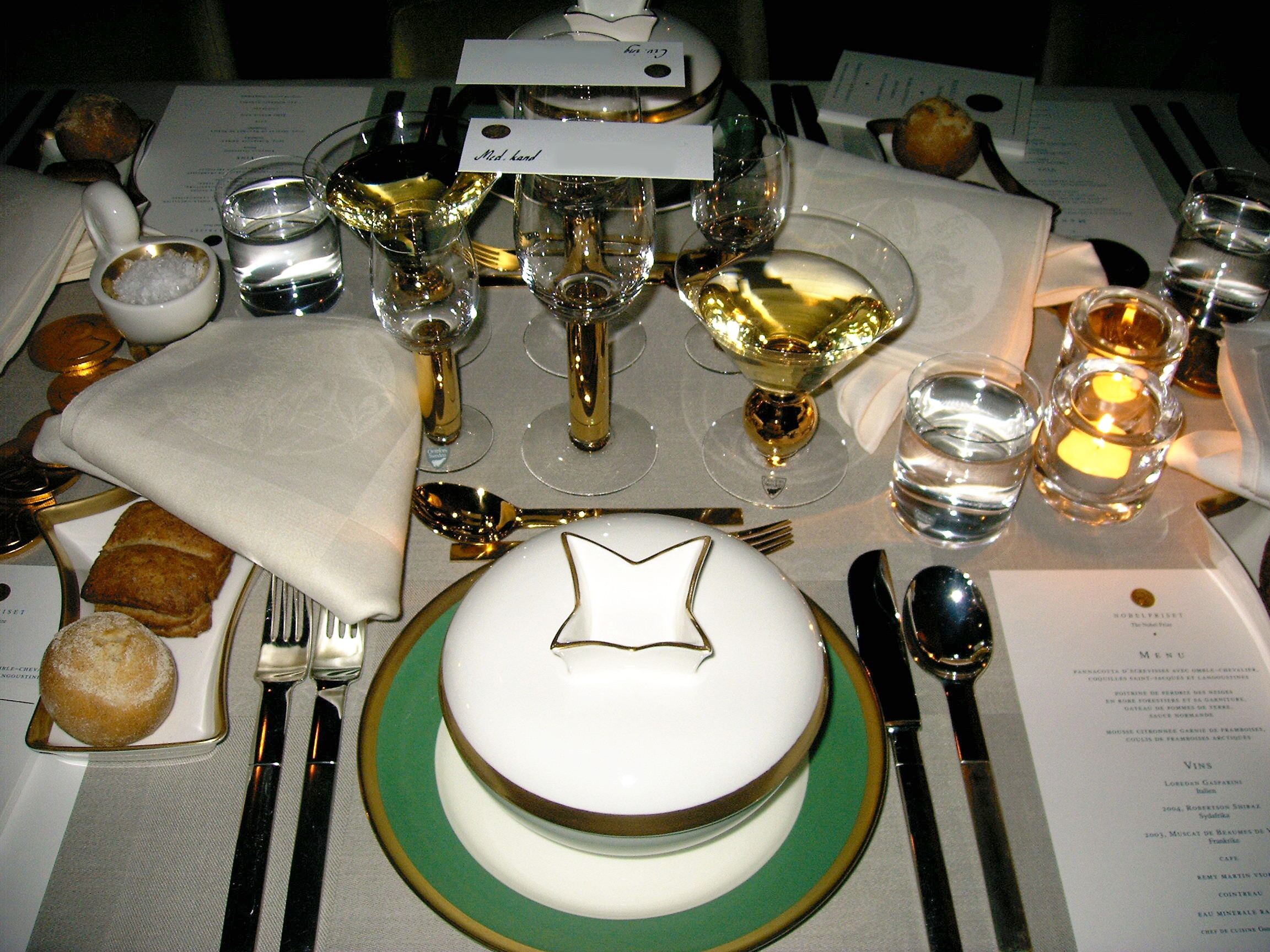
Table serving at the 2005 Nobel Banquet.

Guests at the Nobel Banquet are served a three-course gourmet meal featuring Nordic cuisines, with ingredients sourced from across Sweden. The menu, created by the Stadshuskällaren staff in collaboration with winners of the Swedish Chef of the Year (Swedish: Årets Kock) competition, is kept secret until the banquet begins. The menu does not contain any pork to accommodate guests observing Jewish and Islamic dietary laws; in particular, deer and other game are reserved for the private banquet held by the Royal Court of Sweden on 11 December. However, other menus for guests with certain dietary restrictions, such as vegetarian diets, are served.

In the banquet's early years, the meals were influenced by French cuisine and consisted of more than four courses, with hors d'oeuvres, consommés, and mock turtle soup being the starter courses. The menu was streamlined to the current three-course format in 1945 as the banquet grew in size, although a four-course meal was served at the 1991 Nobel Banquet to commemorate the 90th anniversary of the Nobel Prize. The 1976 banquet introduced the Glace Nobel (French for 'Nobel ice cream'), which would remain as the dessert course through the late 1990s.

== History ==
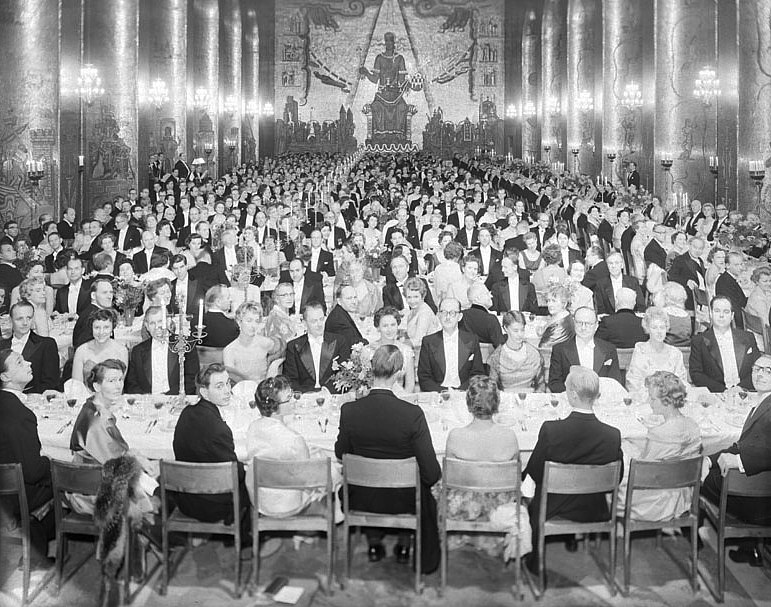
1958 Nobel Banquet in Stockholm City Hall's Golden Hall

The Nobel Banquet was first held in 1901 at the Hall of Mirrors inside the Grand Hôtel in Stockholm – a five-course meal for at least 113 (Note: The number of male guests present at the first Nobel Banquet differ; for example, Söderlind mentioned that either 113 or 118 male guests attended.) male guests. In 1920, two banquets was held; the first at Hasselbacken in June, followed by the second at the Grand Hôtel on 10 December. As the number of guests increased, the banquet moved to Stockholm City Hall, (Note: The banquet returned to the Grand Hôtel from 1931 to 1933 during the Great Depression, held in the Hall of Mirrors in 1931 and 1932, and in the Winter Garden in 1933.) first inside the Golden Hall from 1930 to 1949 and 1951 to 1973, and now in the Blue Hall in 1950 and from 1974 onwards. The 1991 banquet introduced a dedicated tableware service created by Karin Björquist, Gunnar Cyrén, and Ingrid Dessau to commemorate the 90th anniversary of the Nobel Prize, and would later win the Excellent Swedish Design award in 1992; that tableware service is still in use today.

Since 1904, the Royal Court of Sweden hosts a private banquet inside Karl XI's Gallery at the Royal Palace of Stockholm on 11 December. (Note: In some years, the private banquet was held on 12 December.)

=== Incidents ===
During the 1979 banquet, a female student disrupted the entry procession of the guests of honour by performing an impromptu song on the grand staircase of the Blue Hall; she was subsequently removed from the event. In 1981, an unauthorized individual gained access to the staff cloakroom and committed theft, taking clothing and cash.

=== Cancelations ===
The Nobel Banquet had faced cancelations or been held in scaled-back form in 1907, the year King Oscar II died; (Note: An unofficial banquet would instead be held in honor of Rudyard Kipling, the Laureate of the Nobel Prize in Literature of that year.) from 1914 to 1919 amid World War I; in 1924, when no laureates were present in Stockholm; from 1939 to 1944 amid World War II; in 1956 following the Hungarian Revolution; (Note: A smaller dinner would instead be held inside the Stock Exchange Building in Stockholm.) and both in 2020 and 2021 amid the COVID-19 pandemic.

== Television coverage ==
The Nobel Banquet is broadcast by Sveriges Television (SVT), ranking alongside Melodifestivalen, the Eurovision Song Contest, and From All of Us to All of You as among the broadcaster's most-watched programs. Averaging 1.2 million viewers annually in Sweden, the banquet's viewership on SVT often exceeds that of the Nobel Prize award ceremony itself. Science and entertainment elements define the broadcast; science content feature interviews with Nobel laureates, pre-recorded reports from their workplaces, and interviews with researchers and other experts in related fields, while entertainment segments feature discussions about the banquet menu, floral arrangements, and the attire and jewelry of female members of the Swedish royal family, as well as the divertissements and dessert parade. The presence of the Swedish royal family is considered a significant factor in the banquet's popularity; a producer has reportedly instructed camera operators to feature images of Queen Silvia at least every 15 minutes to maintain viewer engagement. Comparisons are often drawn between the Nobel Banquet and the Academy Awards, particularly regarding discussions of attendees' attire. A former CEO of the Nobel Foundation's media division, Nobel Media AB, described the Nobel Banquet as the "jewel in the crown."

The Nobel Banquet on television dates back to 1950, six years before the launch of SVT1 and the start of television broadcasts in Sweden, when five minutes of the event were shown to select audiences at Stockholm Concert Hall and a cinema. The banquet was first broadcast publicly in 1959, lasting a total of 45 minutes, and the 1994 banquet was the first to be televised in its entirety. Early broadcasts of the banquet primarily focused on entertainment content, with scientific content only becoming more prominent in the late 1980s; this shift coincided with the efforts of the Nobel Foundation and the wider scientific community to exercise greater control over Nobel Prize-related television programming to protect its trademark and intellectual property rights, as well as the growth of cable television in Sweden. In 2007, the banquet was broadcast on commercial broadcaster TV4; that broadcaster was to air the banquet as part of a three-year contract, only to be terminated after that year's Nobel Prize award ceremony was broadcast in censored form in China. The 2008 banquet was the first to be broadcast in high definition.

== Public participation ==
Television broadcasts of the Nobel Banquet have enabled the broader Swedish public to experience the event vicariously. Viewers often dine while watching the broadcast, sometimes replicating courses from the actual banquet menu or adhering to its formal dress code. Beyond private viewings, themed Nobel Banquets are held in various public settings, including schools, restaurants, hotels, care facilities, and other venues; these alternative events have encompassed diverse themes, such as LGBTQIA+ banquets and those designed for children, and some banquets incorporate elements of formal etiquette and dancing.

Stadshuskällaren, a restaurant located in Stockholm City Hall, is unique in offering menus from past Nobel Banquets. Guests dining at Stadshuskällaren are served on the same tableware used at the official Nobel Banquet.

== See also ==
- List of dining events
