= Kalevala (brand) =

Finnish jewelry brand

Kalevala Koru Oy
- Type: Osakeyhtiö
- Industry: Jewelry
- Founded: 1941
- Founder: Elsa Heporauta
- Headquarters: Helsinki,
- Key people: Kirsi Kaarina Paakkari, CEO
- Products: Jewelry
- Revenue: 11 million euros (2020)
- Owner: Kalevala Women's Association
- Number of employees: 91 (2020)
- Website: kalevalashop.com

Kalevala is a Finnish jewelry brand owned by Kalevala Koru Oy, a company that designs, manufactures, and markets gold, silver, and bronze jewelry. Kalevala Koru Oy is the largest company in the jewelry industry in Finland and one of the largest in the Nordic countries. Their products are manufactured in Finland.

The manufacture of Kalevala jewelry began in 1937 with the work of writer Elsa Heporauta. Kalevala Koru Oy was founded in 1941 and its parent, Kalevala Women's Association, is a nonprofit organization that supports Finnish cultural initiatives nationwide.

== History ==
=== 1935–1940 ===
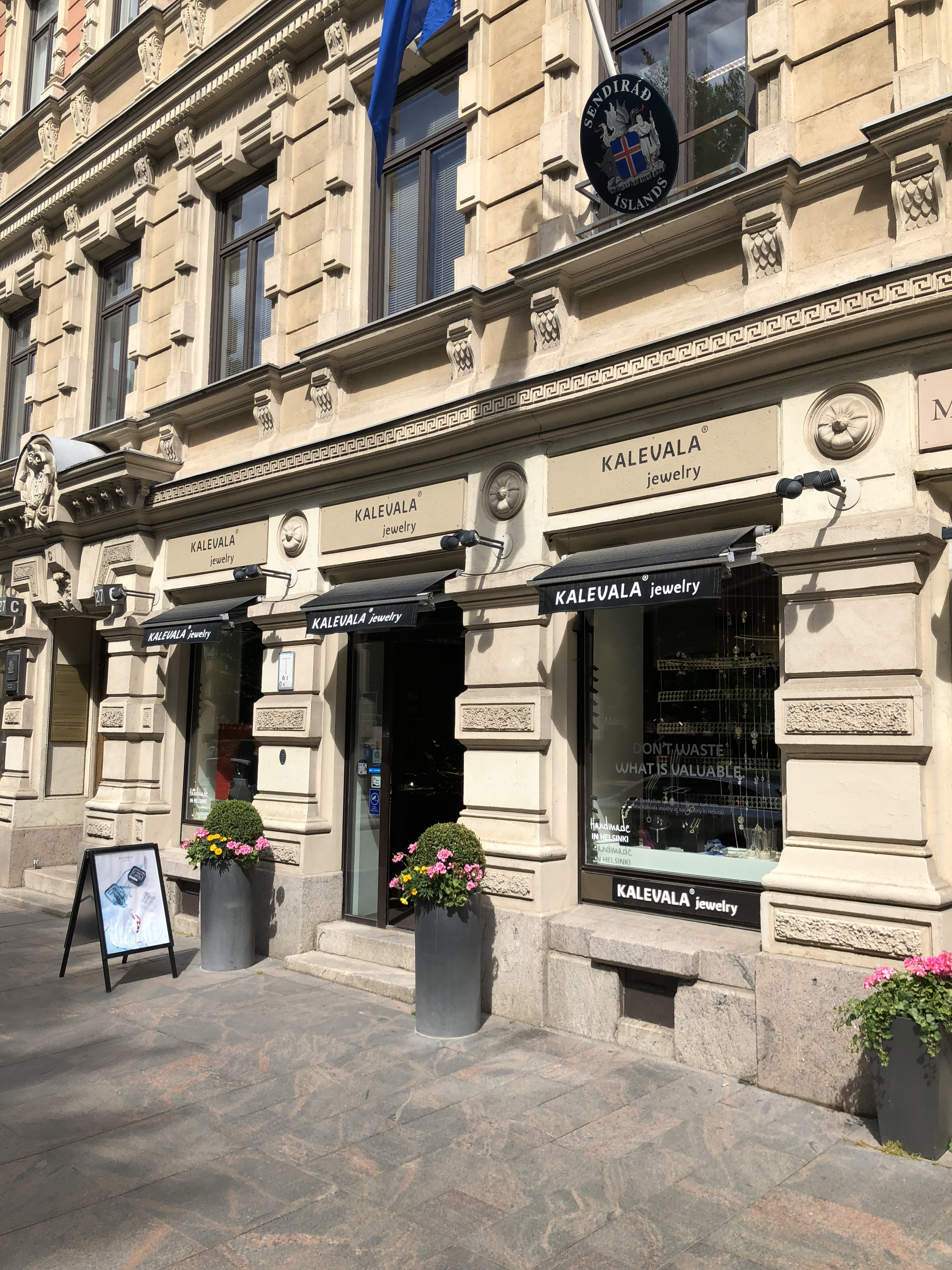
Kalevala shop in Helsinki

The centenary year of the Kalevala epic poem in 1935 inspired writer Elsa Heporauta to think about ways of recognizing the value of Finnish culture. She began to design a statue dedicated to the women of Kalevala.

A monument committee was founded under Heporauta's initiative, with the objective of erecting a statue that commemorates the female poem singers of Kalevala. The subject chosen for the monument was Louhi, a character from the Finnish national epic. The general collection failed to produce the desired funds for the project, however. In order to collect funds, the monument committee decided to establish a company that would sell reproductions of the ancient jewelry of the National Museum of Finland.

The first forty pieces of Kalevala jewelry were designed by Germund Paaer and inspired by ancient jewelry finds. These were clasps that included, among others, St. John's Arms, a design that had illustrated Finnish artefacts already in the Iron Age. In 1937, the pieces of jewelry were presented at a tea party organized by First Lady Kaisa Kallio, and the designs quickly sold out.

In 1939, Heporauta took some of the jewelry to the New York World's Fair. During her trip, she gave seventy-five lectures and met Eleanor Roosevelt, who wrote about Heporauta's visit to the White House in her "My Day" column, which was published in over a hundred different American newspapers.

Due to the outbreak of the Second World War, the collected funds were donated to helping people in need, such as building homes for war widows and helping war orphans. The statue was finished in 1940 and ended up becoming significantly smaller than originally planned. The bronze statue of young Louhi, made by the sculptor Eemil Halonen, is located in the office of the Kalevala Women's Association in Helsinki.

=== 1941–1999 ===
In 1941, the name of the memorial committee was changed to Kalevala Women's Association and Kalevala Koru was incorporated as a limited liability company. From 1941 to 1950, Aino-Mari Mecklin served as the company's first chief executive officer.

Germund Paaer was the first head designer at Kalevala Koru Oy and held the post until his death in 1950. Paaer designed hundreds of items for the company, such as the Moon Goddess pendant designed in the 1940s that is one of the most sold pieces of jewelry in the history of the company. In 1951, Eero Rislakki was hired as the head designer of Kalevala Koru. He was known especially for the use of gemstones. The first female head designer of Kalevala Koru was Paula Häiväoja, who worked as a designer at Kaunis Koru and Kalevala Koru from 1956, and as a designer and head designer between 1963 and 1967. As an artist, Häiväoja was a leading Finnish modernist. Börje Rajalin acted as the company's head designer in 1956–1961 and 1975–1983. He had an important role in introducing modern jewelry design to Kalevala Koru.

Marja Usvasalo started as the CEO of the company in 1988. The following year, the company bought Kaunis Koru, founded by the former director of Kalevala Koru, Martta Ritvanen.

=== 2000–present ===
In 2005, Kalevala Koru bought Lapponia Jewelry, a company that had been considered the international flagship of Finnish jewelry design. Lapponia Jewelry became a subsidiary wholly owned by Kalevala Koru and remained as a separate limited liability company. The turnover of Lapponia was around EUR 5–6 million and the company had about 50 employees.

Laura Lares became Usvasalo's successor as CEO in 2007. and continued until the spring of 2012. Her successor was Riitta Huuhtanen, serving between 2012 and 2019.

In 2018, the company sold the Kalevala Mansion located in Pitäjänmäki, Helsinki. The mansion had been the company's jewelry factory, which now moved to Konala, Helsinki.

In early 2019, Kirsi Paakkari became the CEO of the company.

In the autumn of 2020, Kalevala Koru launched a new brand named Kalevala, combining the legacy of the Lapponia and Kalevala Jewelry brands and introducing new pieces. New online stores for the brand were opened, as well as a new brand store on Keskuskatu, Helsinki, while the old store was closed. In October 2020, Prime Minister Sanna Marin posed for the cover of Trendi magazine wearing an open blazer coat and a Kalevala vintage necklace. The photos resulted in media interest and international media wrote extensively about Marin and Kalevala. In November, an outlet store was opened at the Konala factory, replacing the Pitäjänmäki factory outlet that was closed in 2018.

== Production ==
Kalevala jewelry is manufactured in the company's factory in Konala. The manufacturing method is a combination of craftsmanship and modern techniques. It starts with the 3D modeling of a wax mold, though some of the wax molds are still made by hand. The wax molds are collected into a mold tree that is immersed in plaster. Once the plaster has hardened, the wax is melted away and replaced with liquid metal. After the metal has cooled down, the plaster is removed and the molds are cut from the mold tree. After casting or pressing with metal sheets, the jewelry molds are delivered to a goldsmith. A single piece of jewelry takes about two weeks from primary production to sale. During this time, about ten professionals process the piece of jewelry by polishing, cleaning, hallmarking, and surface treating the mold. The goldsmiths assemble entire pieces of jewelry from the jewelry molds. Finally, the pieces of jewelry are finished by polishing, buffing, and surface treating them. Bronze jewelry is coated with lacquer, while silver jewelry is protected by using nanotechnology. Kalevala Koru was the world's first jewelry manufacturer to utilize the ALD coating process for silver jewelry, where the coating is made one atomic layer at a time.

Recycled gold is used in the manufacture of the jewelry. In 2019, 85 percent of the silver used by Kalevala was recycled. The jewelry collection has been awarded the Key Flag Symbol, which guarantees that the product has been manufactured in Finland.

The company's most famous piece of jewelry is the Planetoid Valleys necklace worn by Princess Leia in the 1977 Star Wars film. The necklace was designed by Björn Weckström, who founded Lapponia together with Pekka Anttila in 1963. The necklace is still in production. John Lennon gifted Yoko Ono with the Petrified Lake ring designed by Weckström.

== Social responsibility ==
The owner of the company, Kalevala Women's Association, is a nonprofit organization supporting Finnish cultural initiatives. The company has also its own foundation, called the Kalevala Koru Cultural Foundation, which manages its charities and annual awards. Since 2020, the company has hosted the Kalevala Training Center education project in Kenya to train young women to become data processors, hairdressers, or tailors.

All metal residue created in the manufacture of jewelry is stored, such as dust, making the process both cost-effective and ecological. During the process, chemicals dissolved in water are purified in the factory's purification plant, ensuring that they do not end up in the sewer. Chemicals used in the coating process are recycled.
