= Nanna Ditzel =

Danish furniture designer (1923–2005)

- Born: 6 October 1923; Copenhagen, Denmark
- Died: 17 June 2005 (aged 81); Copenhagen, Denmark
- Occupation: Designer

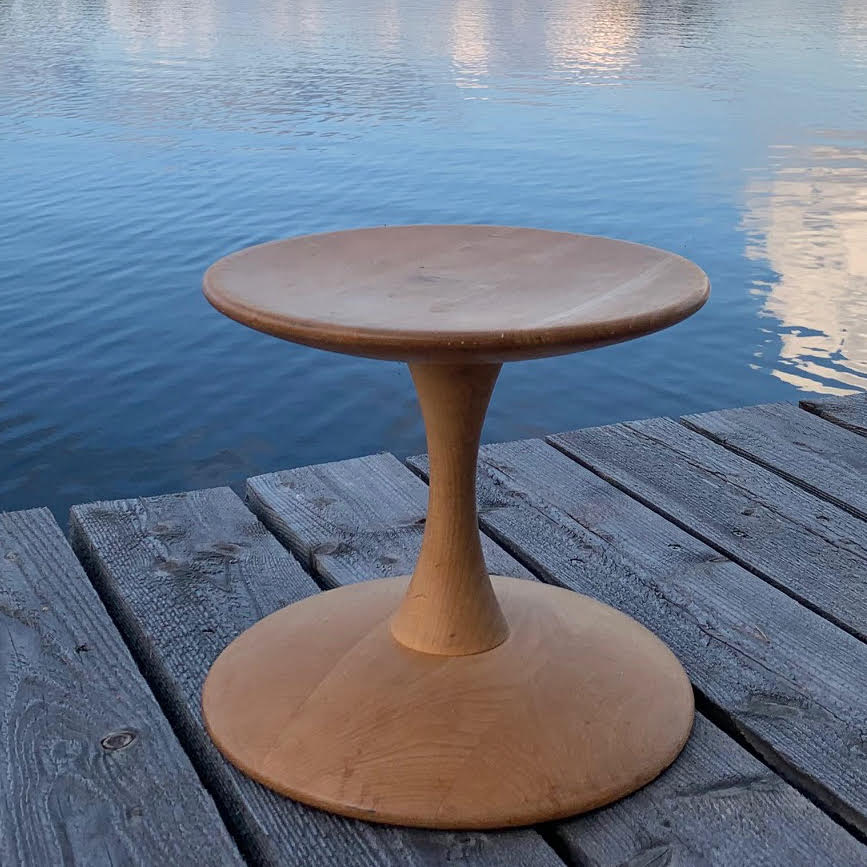
Toad stool designed in 1962

Nanna Ditzel (October 6, 1923 - June 17, 2005) was a Danish designer.

She was educated as a carpenter at Richards Skole and studied at the Danish School of Arts and Crafts where she graduated in 1946. Here she met her first husband, the architect Jørgen Ditzel with whom she collaborated closely until his death in 1961. Her works include furniture, jewelry, tableware and textiles. She also made jewelry designs for Georg Jensen and furniture for Frederica. Nanna Ditzel was known for designing furniture suitable for lying down, she used bright colours and she was very much inspired by nature.

== Main works ==
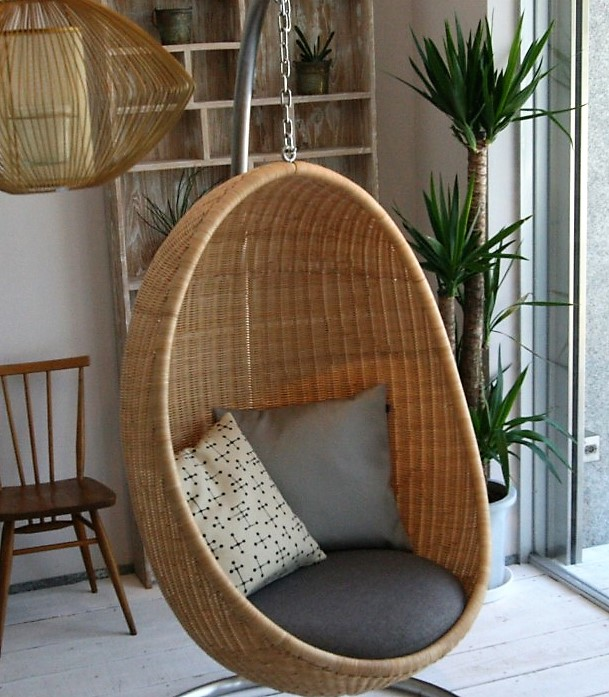
- Hanging Egg Chair
  Hanging Egg Chair
- Trinidad chair
- Lulu cradle
- Nanny Rocking Chair
- Bench for two
- Butterfly chair
- Toad stool and table
- Hallingdal - upholstery fabric

== Awards ==
- 1956 Lunning Prize
- 1991: C. F. Hansen Medal
- 1998 the lifelong Artists' Grant by the Danish Ministry of Culture

== Bibliography ==
- Nanna Ditzel: ’’ Danish chairs’’, 1954
- Nanna Ditzel: ‘’ Nanna Ditzel, Munkeruphus 1992( Book )
- Nanna Ditzel: ‘’ Tanker bliver ting : Nanna Ditzel design’’, 1994
- Henrik Sten Mller : ‘’Motion and beauty : the book of Nanna Ditzel’’, 1998
- Nanna Ditzel: Nanna Ditzel : trapperum; stairscapes; Exhibition Nanna Ditzel Trapperum - Stairscapes Kunstindustrimuseet, 2002
- Fabia Masciello : ‘’Nanna Ditzel : design nordico al femminile ‘’, 2003 en Italien
- Hanne Horsfeld: ‘’ Nanna Ditzel’’, 2005
- Anne Cathrine Wolsgaard Iversen: "Nanna Ditzels smykker", 2023
