= Ingrid Dessau =

Swedish textile artist

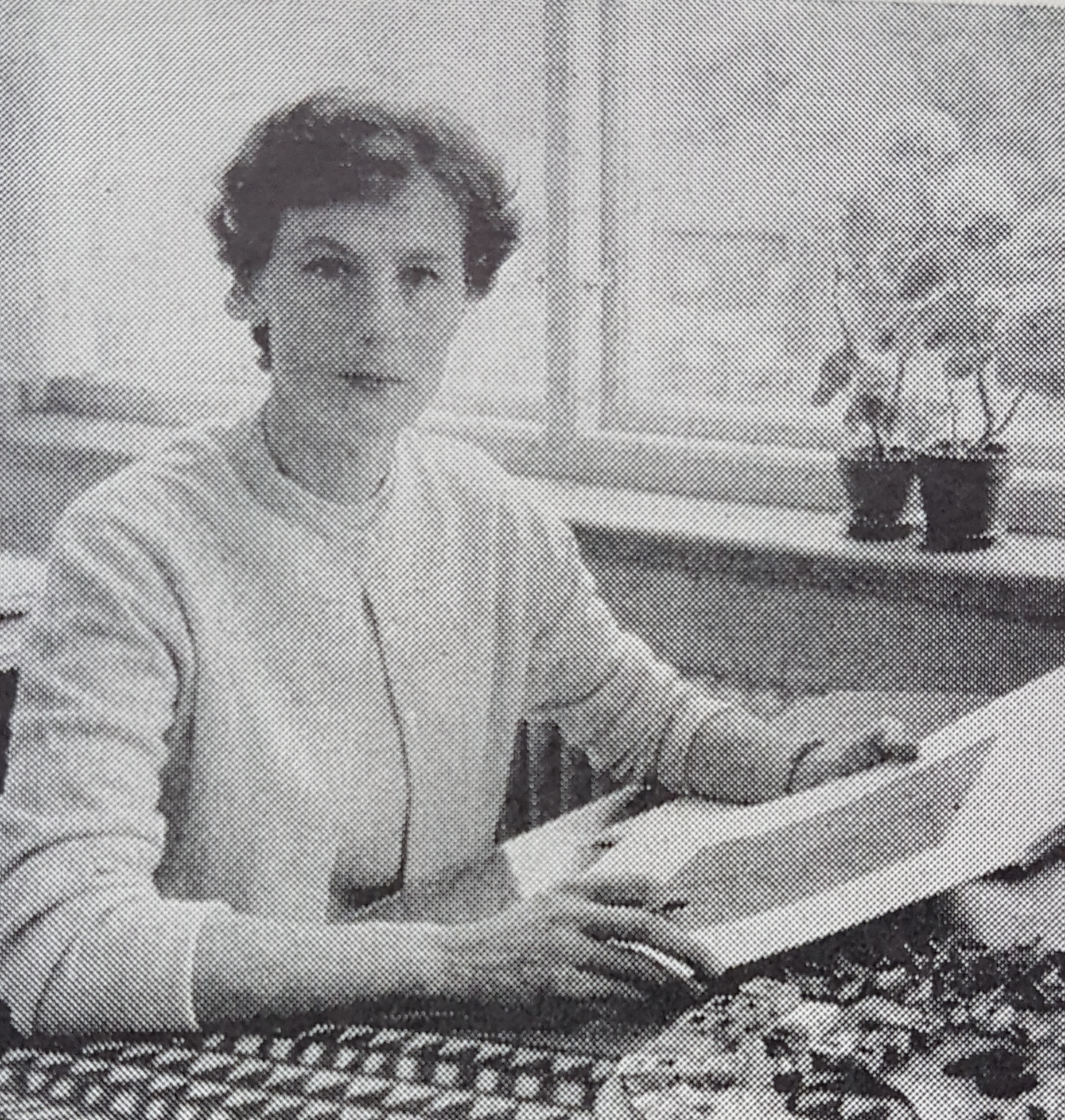
- Born: Ingrid Peterson; 3 March 1923; Svalöv, Sweden
- Died: 15 June 2000 (aged 77)
- Education: Tekniska skolan
- Occupation: Textile artist
- Spouse: Kaj Dessau (m. 1949–1954)
- Parents: Victor Peterson (father); Anna-Stina Wallman (mother)
- Relatives: Rudolf Petersson (uncle)

Ingrid Dessau (née Peterson; 3 March 1923 in Svalöv – 15 June 2000) was a Swedish textile artist.

== Work ==
Ingrid Dessau was the daughter of the manager Victor Peterson and Anna-Stina Wallman. She was married from 1949-1954 to the director Kaj Dessau (1897–1987), the founder of Illums Bolighus. She was the niece of Rudolf Petersson. She studied at Tekniska skolan in Stockholm and began her career at Kristianstads läns Hemslöjd, where her work involved documenting the county's textiles through watercolor paintings. She also designed patterns for rugs such as ryas.

Her artistic breakthrough came in 1953 through a joint exhibition with Signe Persson-Melin at Galerie Moderne in Stockholm. This was followed by employment at the company Kasthall, where she became the head designer. She also created designs for Kinnasand in Kinna and Hitex. In 1991, she was commissioned by Klässbols linneväveri to design the tablecloth and napkins for the Nobel Dinner, which celebrated its 90th anniversary that year.

In 2008, a retrospective exhibition was arranged as a collaboration between the Design Archive and the Textile Museum of Borås called Till det enkla – Ingrid Dessau textildesigner. The design archive holds an extensive collection of both textiles and sketches from Ingrid Dessau's professional life. Dessau's works are also exhibited at the Nationalmuseum in Stockholm.

== Prizes and awards ==
- 1948-49 – Swedish Crafts Association scholarship holder. For studies in America and Mexico.
- 1955 – Lunning Prize
- 1965 – Statens Konstnärsstipendium (government artist scholarship)
- 1990 – Prince Eugen Medal
- 1998 – honorary professorship
