= Ann Wolff =

German glass artist

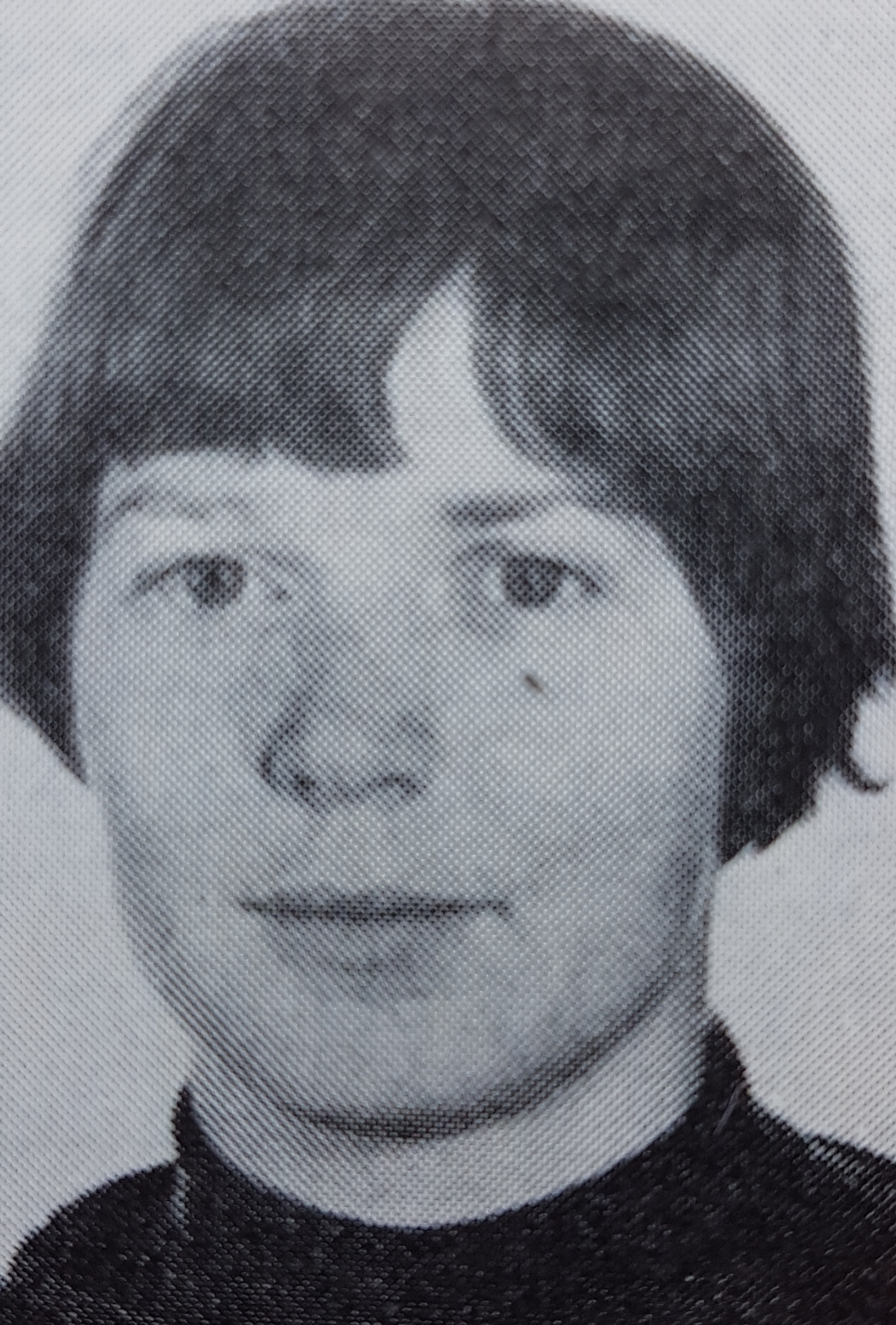
- Ann Wolff.
- Born: 1937 (age 88–89); Lübeck
- Education: Ulm School of Design (1956-1959)
- Known for: Sculpture
- Website: www.annwolff.se

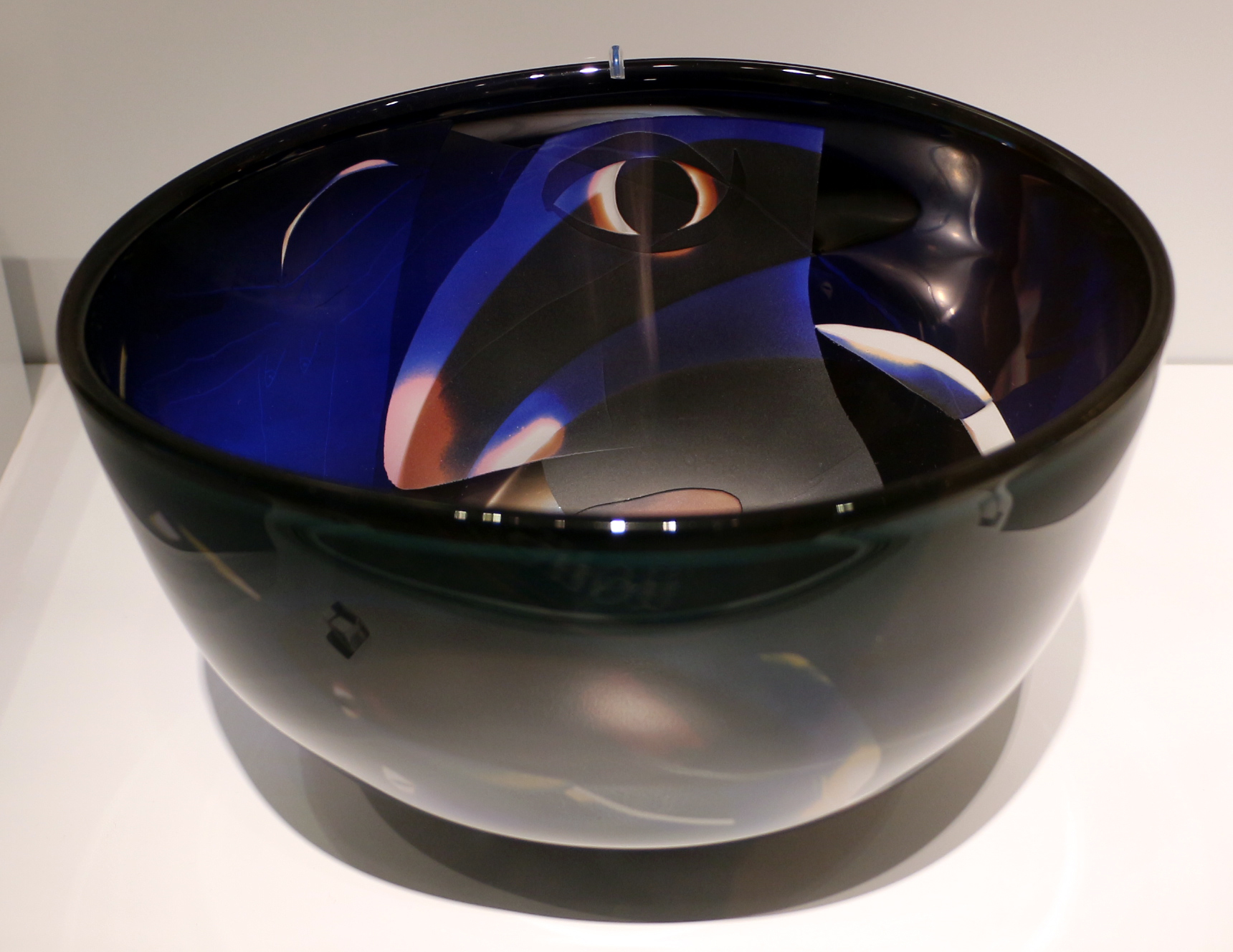
Glassware in the Indianapolis Museum of Art

Ann Wolff (born 1937, Lübeck, Germany) is a glass artist who lives and works in both Gotland, Sweden, and in Berlin, Germany. Wolff's blown, engraved, and cast work explores the lives of women, their relationship with one another, and their position in society. She is considered one of the founders of the international Studio Glass movement.

== Biography ==
Born in Lübeck, Germany, Wolff moved to Sweden after graduating from the Ulm School of Design in 1959. Her career as a glass designer and artist led to her involvement as an instructor at the Pilchuck Glass School in Seattle, Washington, as early as 1977. Wolff was born Ann Schaefer, but changed her last name to Wolff in honor of her maternal grandmother in 1985 after a divorce from fellow glass artist Göran Wärff. She established a non-profit foundation, AWC (Ann Wolff Collection Foundation), in Berlin, Germany, in 2008.

== Career ==
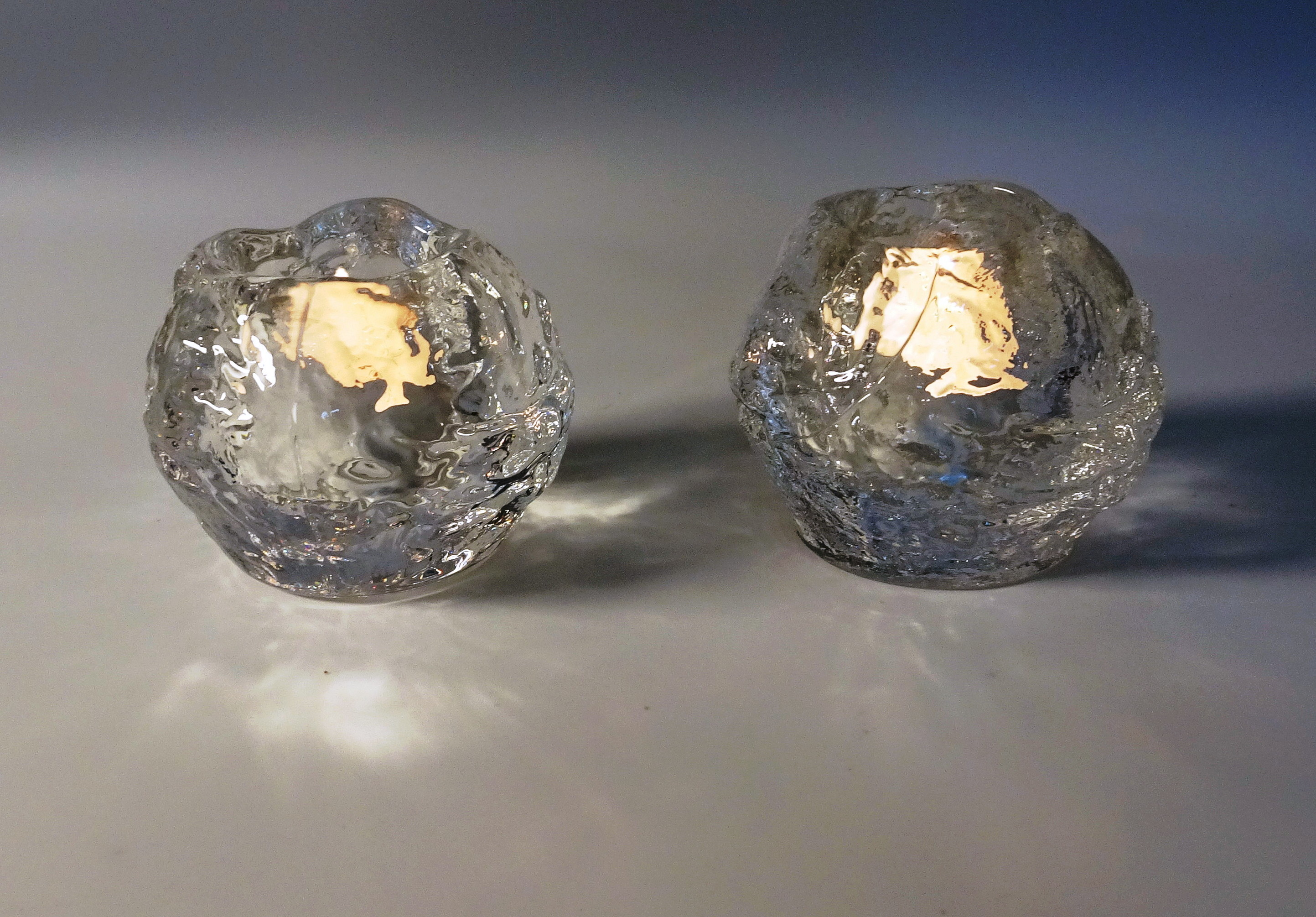
Snöbollen 'Snowball' designed by Ann and Göran Wärff for Kosta Glasbruk

Wolff trained at Hochschule für Gestaltung, Ulm, Germany between 1956 and 1959. She has worked as a designer at Pukeberg Glasbruk, Sweden, and Kosta Boda, Kosta, Sweden. She established an independent studio practice in Transjö, Kosta, Sweden in 1978, later opening studios in Kyllaj and Visby in Gotland, Sweden, and in Berlin, Germany.

Her work resides in many international public collections including: The Chrysler Museum of Art, Norfolk, Virginia; Corning Museum of Glass, Corning, New York; Hokkaido Museum of Modern Art, Hokkaido, Japan; Los Angeles County Museum of Art (LACMA), Los Angeles, California; Mint Museum of Craft + Design, Charlotte, North Carolina; Musée des Arts Décoratifs, Paris; National Museum of Modern Art, Tokyo; and the Victoria and Albert Museum, London.

== Awards ==
Wolff is the recipient of numerous awards. Some of her more recent acknowledgements include the Jurors Award, Toledo Museum of Art, Toledo, Ohio (2005); Jurors Award, Muskegon Museum of Art, Muskegon, Michigan (2006); Award of Excellence, Smithsonian Renwick Collections, Washington, DC (2008); Award of Excellence, Tacoma Museum of Glass, Tacoma, Washington (2010); and the Lifetime Achievement Award, Glass Art Society (2011). Older awards Wolff has won range from the Lunning Prize, New York, NY in 1968, to the Rakow Commission in 1997 The Corning Museum of Glass, Corning, NY.
