= Puhl & Wagner =

Puhl & Wagner was the largest German company for the production of glass mosaics and stained glass. Based in Berlin and headquartered in Neukölln, the company traded from 1889 to 1969. From 1914 to 1933, the firm was known as Puhl & Wagner Gottfried Heinersdorff, but Heinersdorff was denied his partnership and administrative position in the firm after being declared a "half-Jew" (Halbjude in German) during the rise of Adolf Hitler and National-socialism.

== History ==
Puhl & Wagner was founded in 1889 in Berlin. Commissions from Wilhelm II confirmed the company as the country's leading producer of glass mosaics. By 1904 the company required a new building which was designed by Franz Schwechten. Puhl & Wagner merged in 1914 with the company belonging to Gottfried Heinersdorff who had excellent connections with several contemporary artists. The new company, which was named "Puhl & Wagner Gottfried Heinersdorff", produced stained glass and mosaics.

After the Nazis came to power the company won further commissions and after the war received orders from private businesses. In 1969, as a result of the Berlin Wall, the company stopped trading in 1969. The company archives are now held in public ownership.

Puhl & Wagner is probably best known in Sweden for their mosaics in the Golden Hall of the Stockholm City Hall which was constructed between 1921 and 1923.

== Example work ==
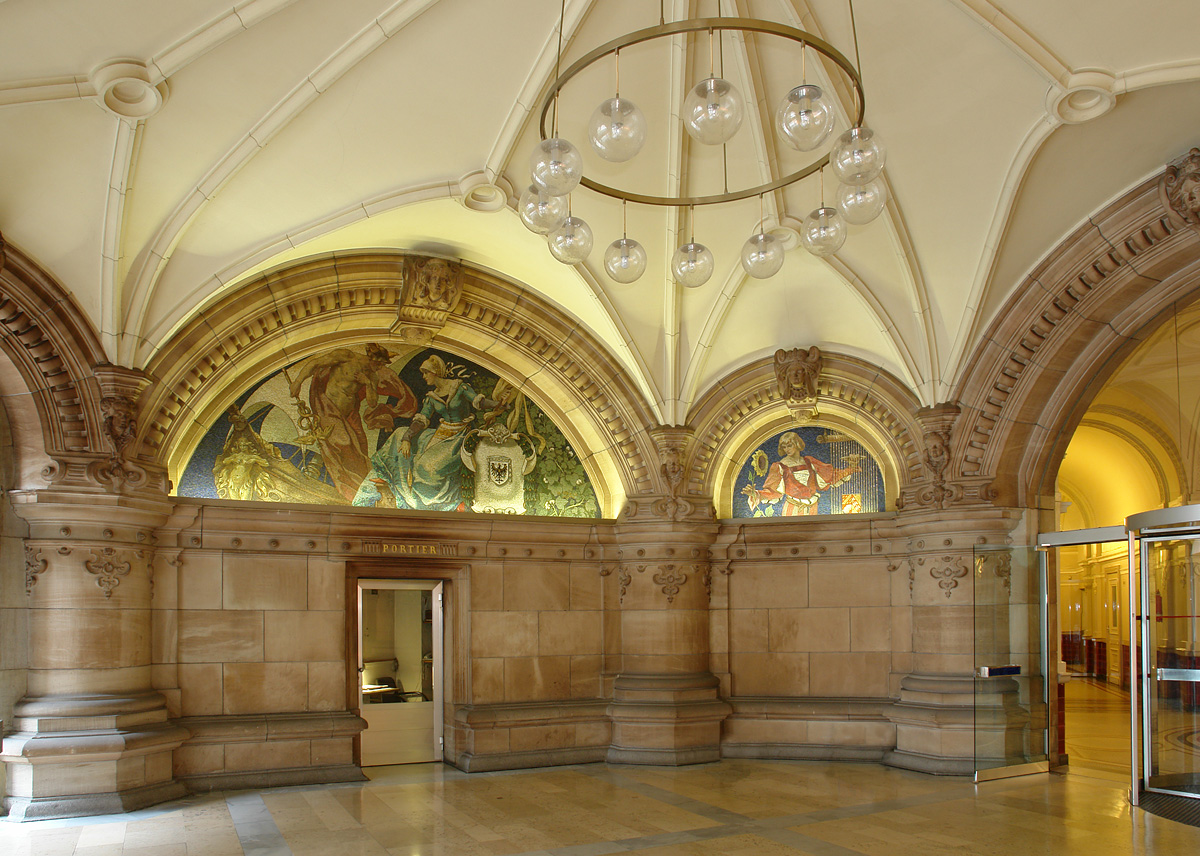
Cotton exchange Bremen

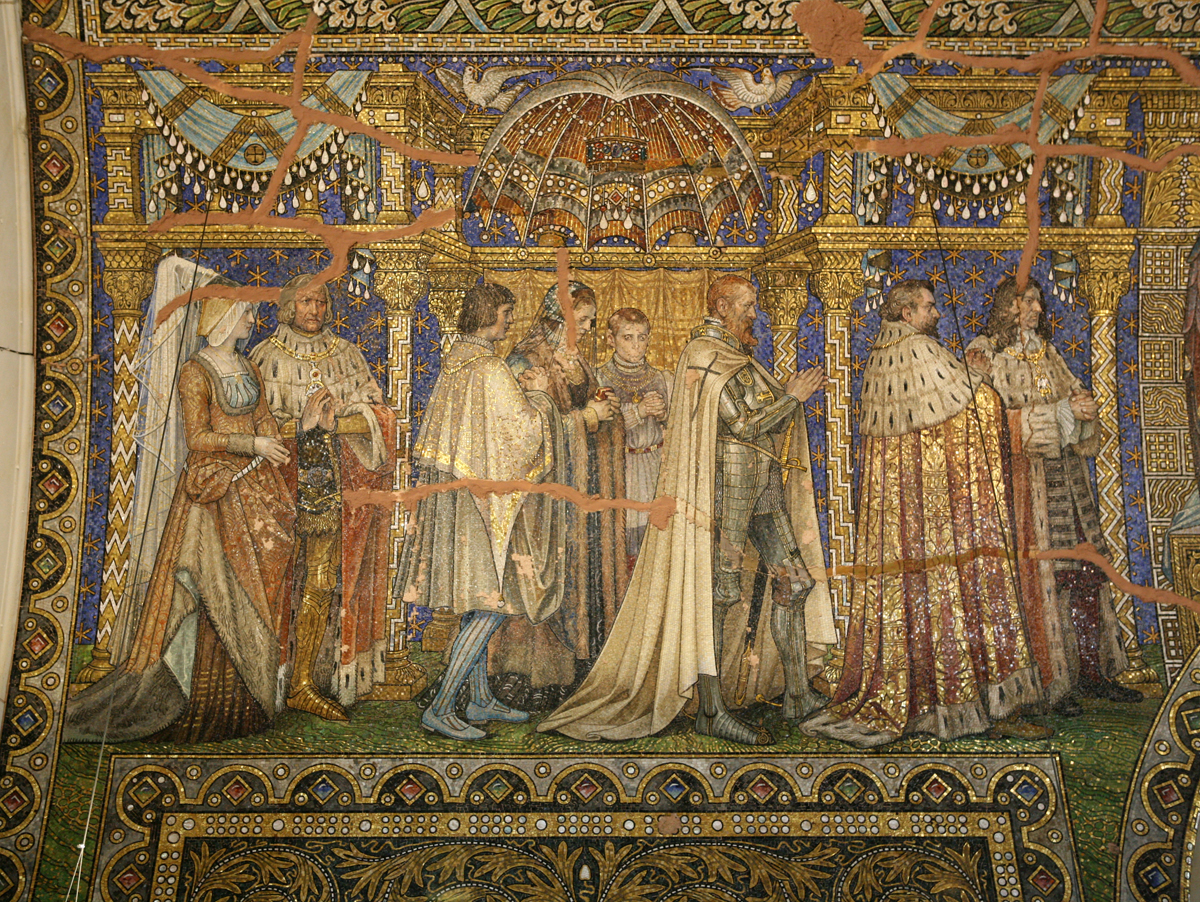
Kaiser Wilhelm Memorial Church in Berlin

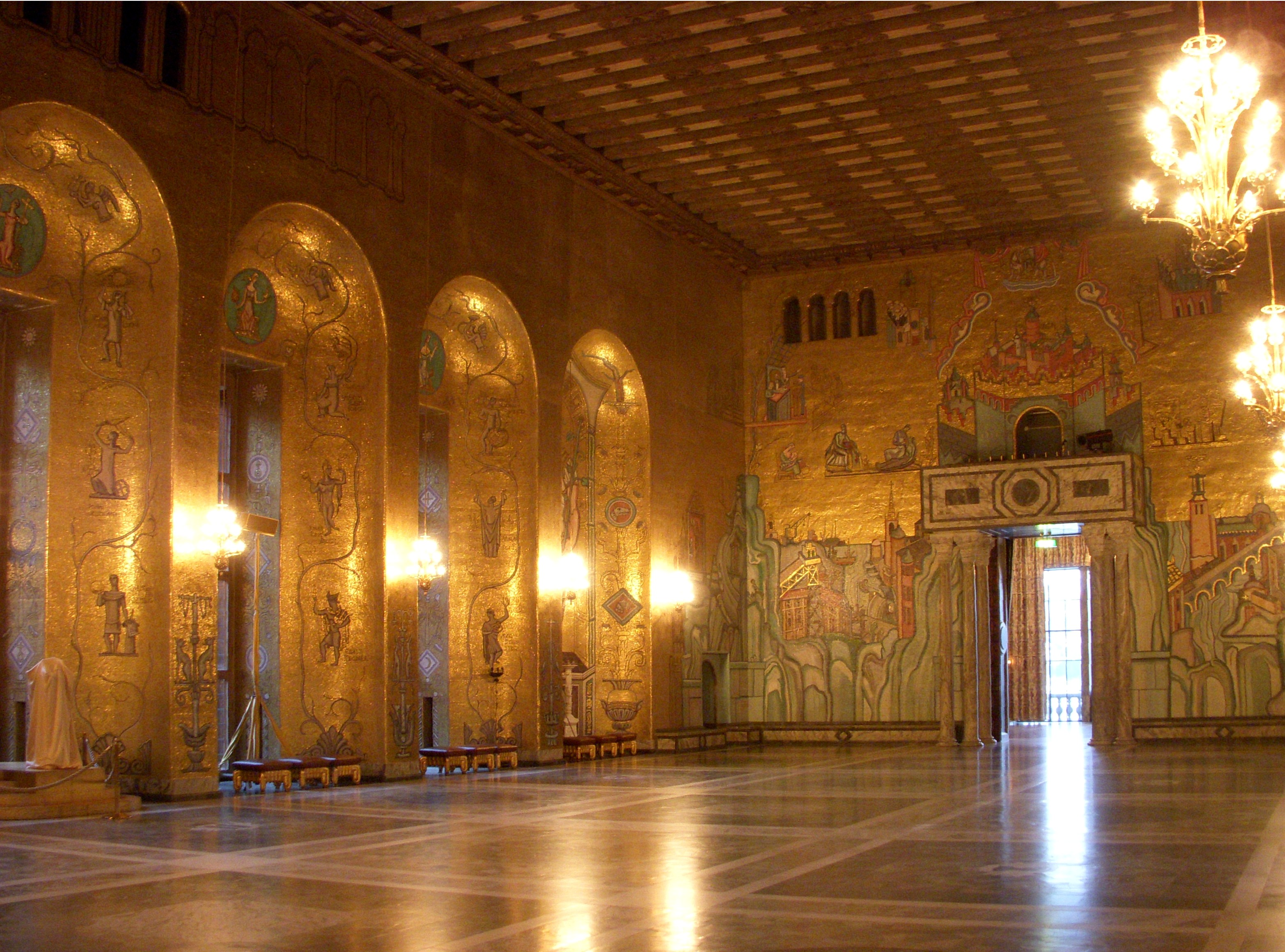
Golden Hall in Stockholm City Hall

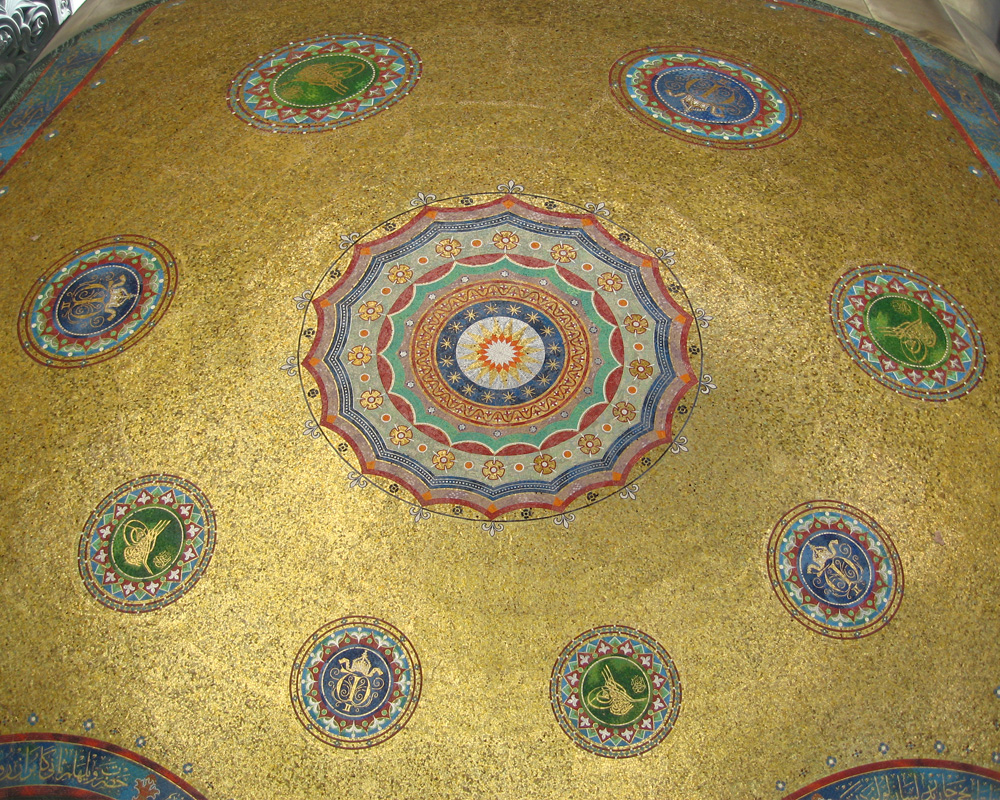
Deutscher Brunnen in Istanbul

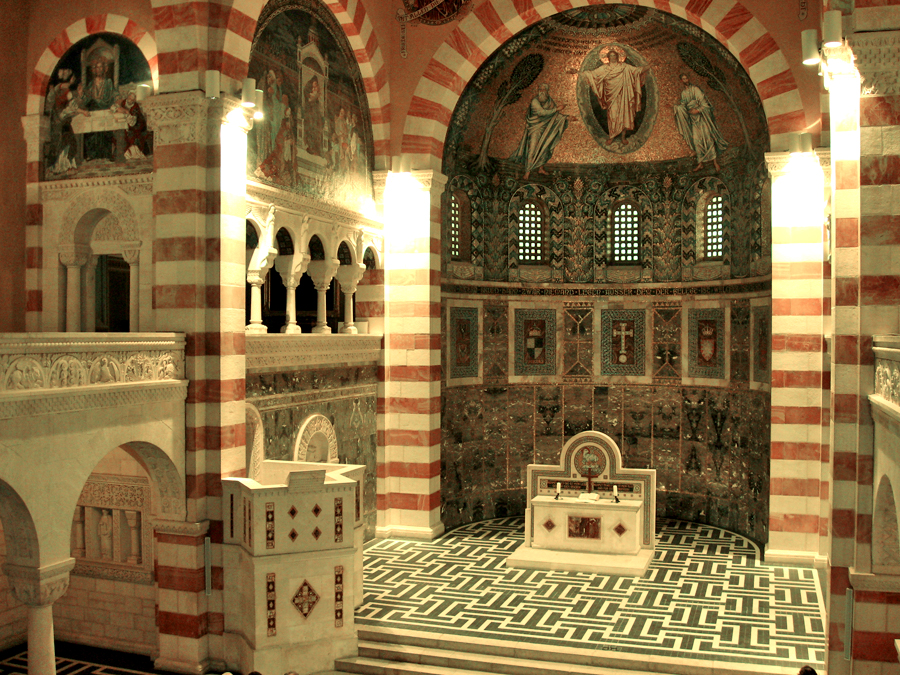
Himmelfahrtkirche in Jerusalem

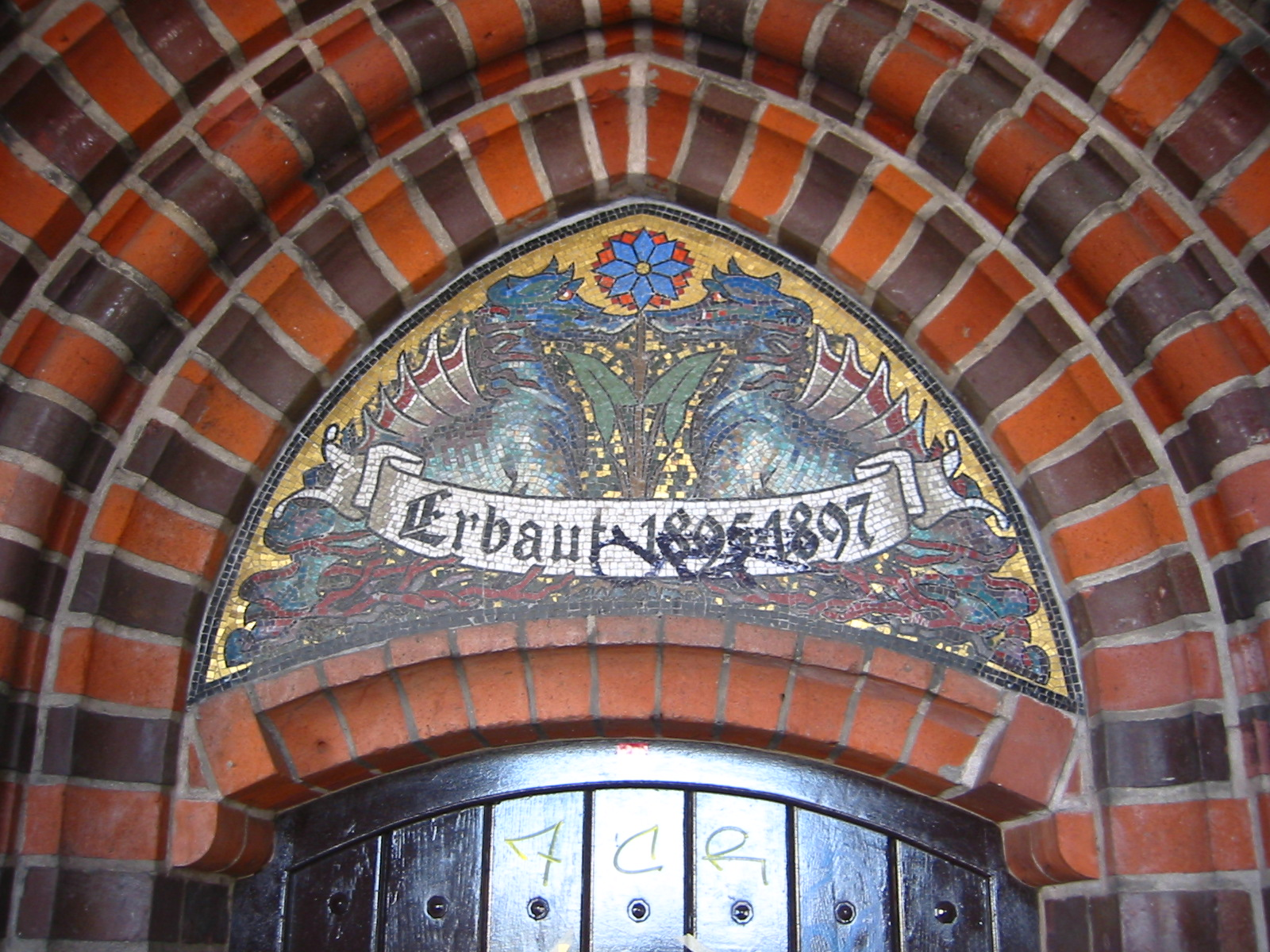
Oberbaumbrücke in Berlin
