= Erik Pløen =

Norwegian ceramist

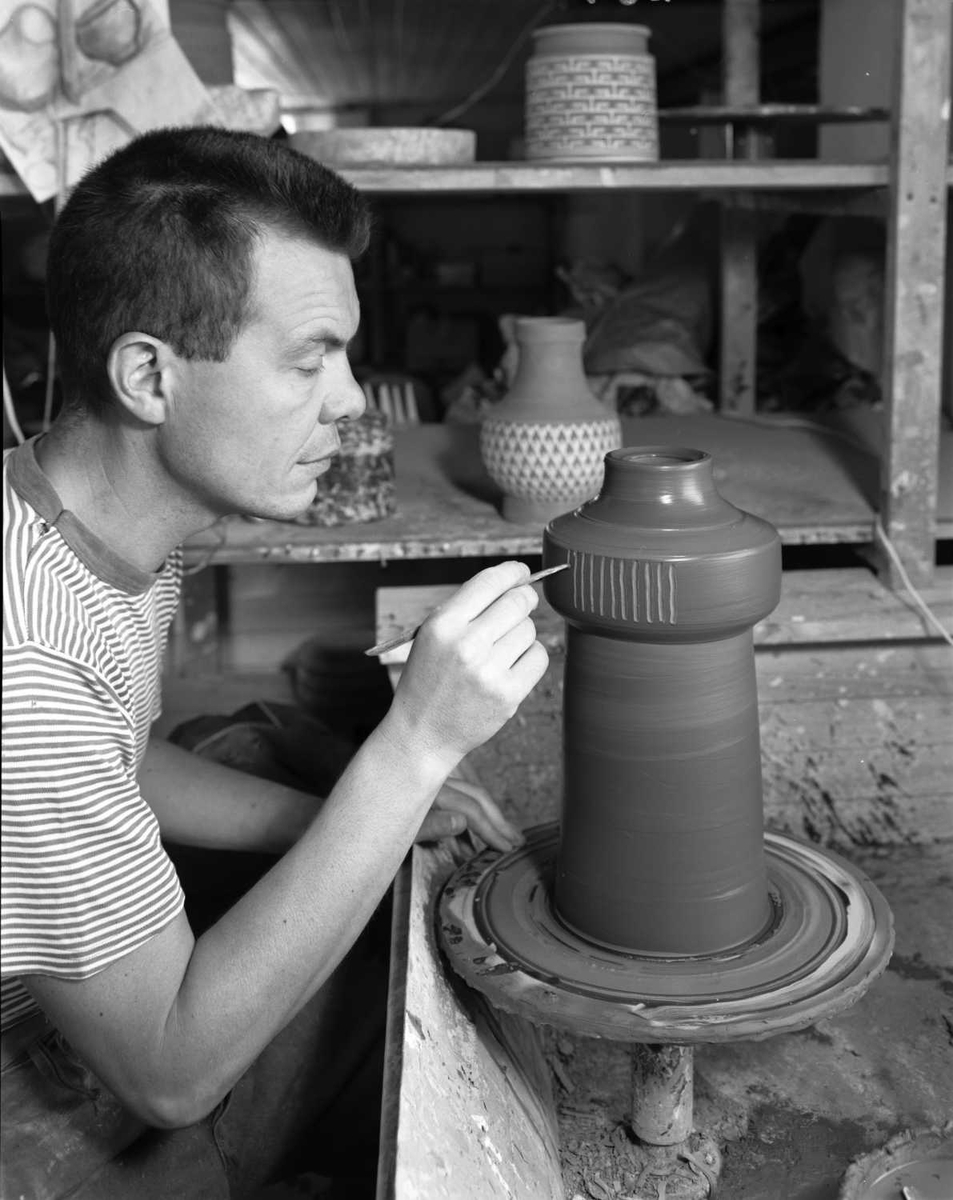
- Erik Pløen
- Born: February 10, 1925; Gran, Oppland, Norway
- Died: October 10, 2004 (aged 79); Son i Vestby, Akershus, Norway

Erik Pløen (1925 – 2004) was a modern Norwegian ceramicist.

== Biography ==
Pløen was born in 1947 in Norway. Pløen never received any formal education on his art, but instead learned through his experience as an apprentice.

== Career ==
Pløen started as an apprentice in 1942 Schneider and Knutzen at Slemdal in Oslo at the age of 16. In 1946, Pløen started his own workshop in Singapore.

In 1958, Pløen's work was featured at the exhibition Formes Scandinaves at the Louvre in Paris.

Pløen gained international recognition in 1961 when he was awarded the prestigious Nordic Lunning Prize.

Pløen became a guest professor at the Midway Studio of the University of Chicago from 1963–1964. During his time at the University of Chicago, he installed and used a gas fired kiln, which allowed for reduction firing, a method that allowed for baking ceramics with a reduced influx of oxygen, allowing for different glazes to be used. The higher temperatures of the gas stove allowed Pløen to reduce the air supply during burning, which greatly affected the glaze colors that he used. This was a new technique in the world of Scandinavian ceramics at the time.

In 1964, he was invited to exhibit at Italy’s famous Triennale di Milano.

Towards the later part of his career his pieces started to lose their utility function and Erik began to model forms that were strongly inspired by what he found at the bottom of the sea when diving in the fjord.

Since 2010, the record price for Pløen's works at auction is 1,306 USD for Vase, sold at Blomqvist in 2023.
