= Eero Rislakki =

Finnish industrial engineer (1924-2017)

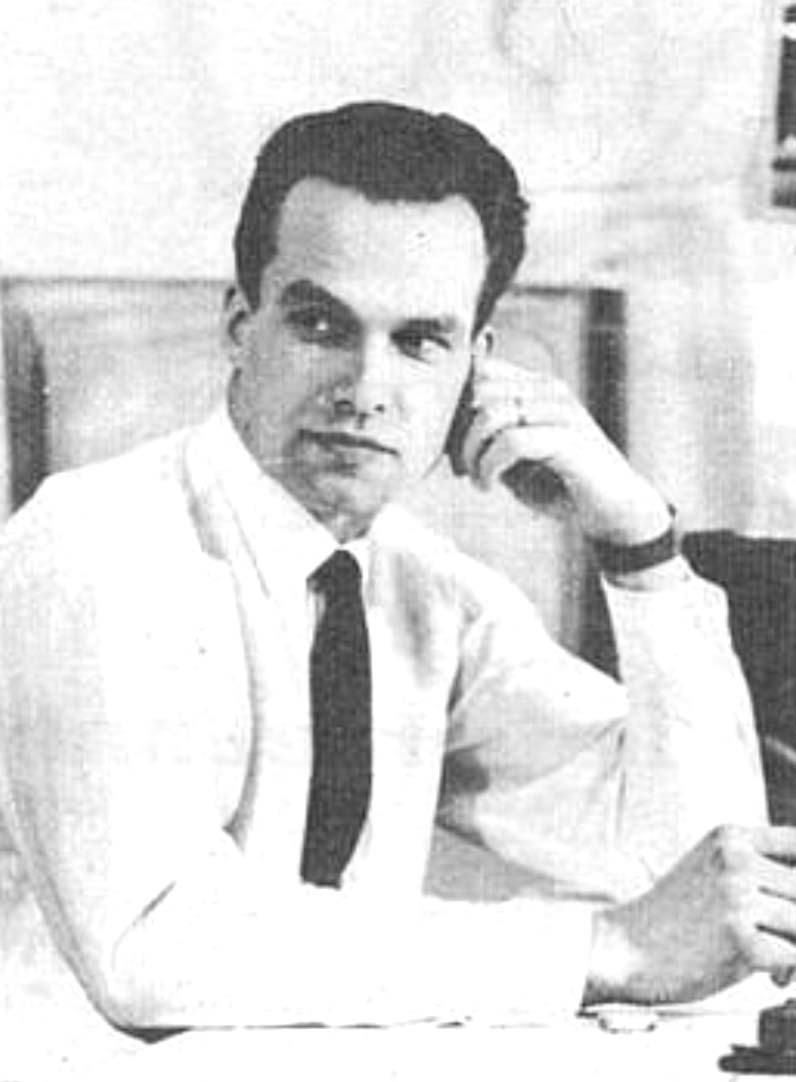

Eero Ensio Rislakki (25 June 1924, in Helsinki – 7 June 2017) was a Finnish industrial engineer. He designed, among other things, the Helkama Jopo bicycle, the Tikkurila Church communion set, bathroom fixtures, reflectors, spectacle frames, air conditioner enclosures, and jewelry for Kalevala Jewelry. He was appointed honorary member of Teolliset muotoilijat ("Industrial designers") TKO in 1996 and was awarded the Pro Finlandia Medal of the Order of the Lion of Finland in 2005. Rislakki lived in Sweden but visited Finland during the summer months. While living in Sauvo, Rislakki worked in Sauvo's cultural and economic development boards. He had been part of the State committee of industrial art and Turku and Pori County Art Committee.

Eero Rislakki was the son of Ensio Rislakki, a writer and journalist who was also awarded the Pro Finlandia Medal.
