= Eli-Marie Johnsen =

Norwegian textile artist

- Born: 21 August 1926; Oslo, Norway
- Died: 28 June 2015 (aged 88)
- Occupation: Textile artist
- Spouse: Per Göranson

Eli-Marie Johnsen (21 August 1926 – 28 June 2015) was a Norwegian textile artist and lecturer.

She was born in Oslo to Oscar Johnsen and Alvilde Foss, and was married to painter and textile artist Per Göranson.

Among her works is Lovens bokstaver at the Supreme Court of Norway, and carpets located at the Norwegian Water Resources and Energy Directorate in Oslo. Other works are Romdrakt for en dame (1967), Vestenvind (1970), Vinblomst (1972), and Atomkraftdansen (1979). She was awarded the Lunning Prize in 1995.
