= Hans Krondahl =

Swedish weaver and textile designer (1929–2018)

- Born: 30 June 1929; Brösarp, Skåne, Sweden
- Died: 2018 (aged 88–89)
- Education: Konstfack
- Known for: Textile art and design, painting

Hans Krondahl (30 June 1929 – 2018) was a Swedish painter, tapestry weaver, textile artist and textile designer. He studied painting and textile art at Konstfack, (State College of Arts, Crafts and Design) in Stockholm from 1955 to 1960.

Between 1959 and 1975, Krondahl designed textile designs for Nordiska Kompaniet's textile division under Astrid Sampe. Krondahl set up his own studio in 1960 in Brösarp, where he created tapestries and related artwork, and he also took up fabric designing for various Swedish companies. The studio closed in 1992. From the early 1960s Krondahl taught Textile Art and Design in various schools in Sweden and abroad. Periodically from 1974 on, Krondahl worked in the U.S. He held a position as Textile Design Expert for UNIDO in Bandung, Indonesia in 1979 and 1980. In 1981 Krondahl became head of the Crafts Department, University of Gothenburg and in 1988 he was appointed Professor of Textile Art at the same institution. In 1965 he was awarded the Lunning Prize, and in 2002 he received the Prince Eugen Medal.

== Literature and sources ==
- The Design Encyclopedia, MoMA, New York 2004. ISBN 0-87070-012-X
- The Lunning Prize, Nationalmuseum, cat. 489, Stockholm 1986. ISBN 91-7100-297-9
- 34 Scandinavian Designers, (Möller, S.E.), Copenhagen 1967.
- Design since 1945, (ed. Hiesinger, Kathryn.), Philadelphia 1983.
- Contemporary Textile Art (Talley, Charles S.), Uppsala 1982. ISBN 91-7528-024-8
- Twentieth-Century Pattern Design. (Jackson, Lesley) New York 2002. ISBN 1-56898-333-6
- Hans Krondahl : textila verk. (Lewenhaupt, Tonie & Stensman, Mailis). Stockholm 2009. ISBN 978-91-7331-231-8
- Fiber Art Today (Carol K. Russell), Arglen, PA. Schiffer, 2011. ISBN 978-0-7643-3777-2
