= Vivianna Torun Bülow-Hübe =

Swedish jewellery designer (1927–2004)

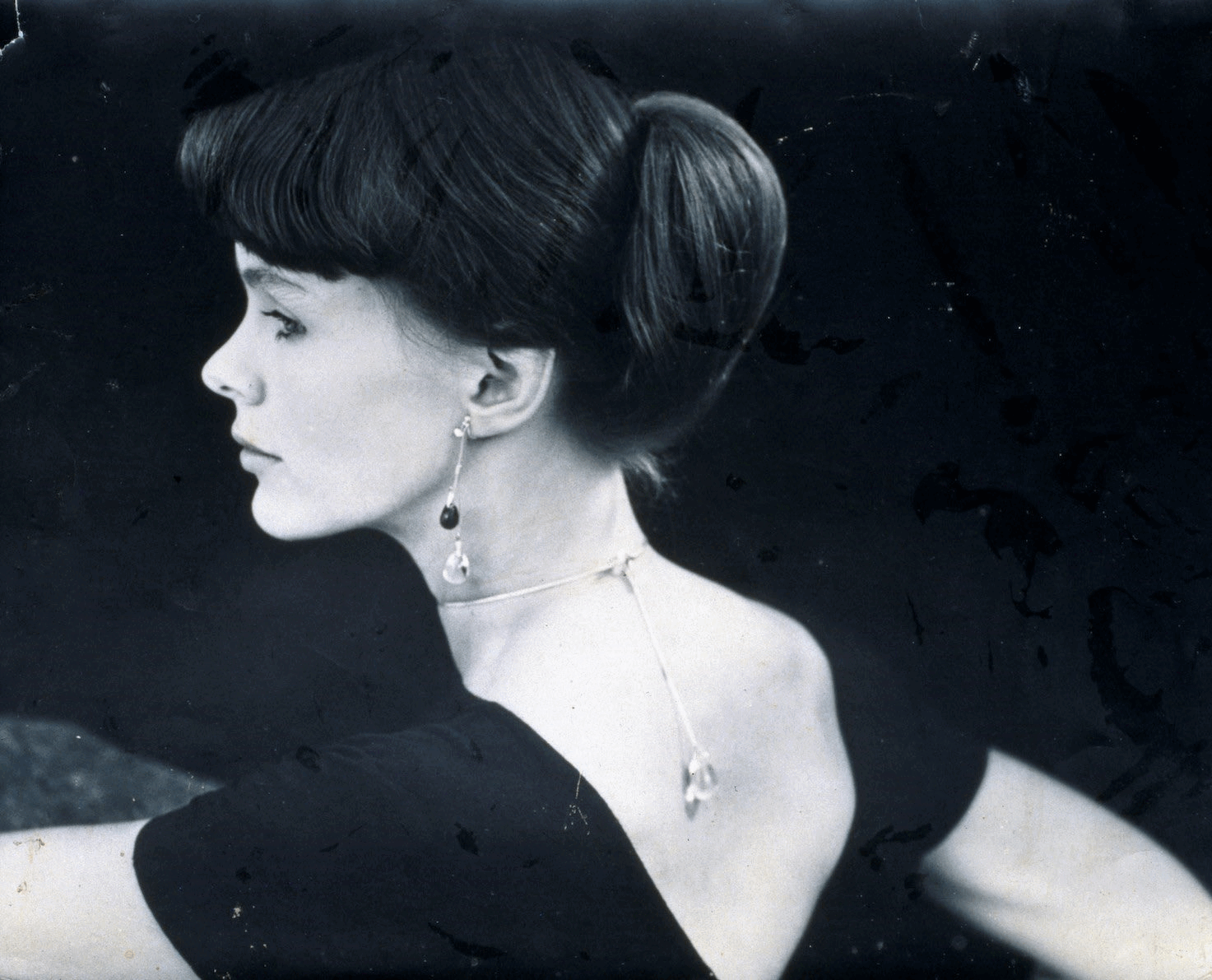
- Torun Bülow-Hübe wearing her own "Dew Drop" design
- Born: 4 December 1927; Malmö, Sweden
- Died: 3 July 2004 (aged 76); Copenhagen, Denmark
- Education: Stockholm University of Arts, Crafts and Design
- Known for: Jewellery and silver work

Vivianna Torun Bülow-Hübe (4 December 1927 – 3 July 2004), often known simply as Torun, was one of Sweden's most important 20th century silversmiths and a master jeweller. She is the first female silversmith to have become internationally noted. Among her most important works are the watch "Vivianna," the bracelet "Mobius," and the earrings and necklaces "Dew Drop."

== Early life ==
Born Torun Bülow-Hübe, she grew up in Malmö with her sculptor mother, town planner father and three older siblings. Her entire family was creative: a sister became a poet and her brother and other sister grew up to become architects. Torun began making jewelry as a teenager. She attended the Stockholm university of arts, crafts and design Konstfackskolan (later renamed Konstfack). She staged her first exhibition at the age of 21. In 1948 she traveled to Paris and Cannes, where she met painters Pablo Picasso (whom she 10 years later exhibited with), Georges Braque and Henri Matisse. A few years later she opened her own studio, which made her the first female silversmith in Sweden with her own workshop.

== Personal life ==
In 1946 Torun married a Danish journalism student and welcomed her first child, Pia. The marriage was short-lived and they divorced in 1948. In 1951, Torun married a French architect, with whom she had her second child, Claude in 1952. In 1955 they divorced, and Torun lost custody of Claude to his father. She met her third husband, the African-American painter Walter Coleman in Stockholm and then moved to Paris. Together they had two children, Ira Coleman in 1956 and Marcia in 1963. In 1958 the family moved to Biot in the south of France to avoid the political problems they were encountering in Paris as a result of the war in Algeria. In 1965 Torun's marriage to Coleman dissolved.

After the break of her third marriage, Torun become a member of the Subud international spiritual movement. As a symbol for this spiritual change, she adopted "Vivianna" as an additional first name in 1967, and in 1968 she moved to Germany to be nearer to a Subud community. In 1978, she moved with her youngest daughter to Jakarta in Indonesia, the birthplace for the Subud movement. In 2002, after being diagnosed with leukemia, she left Indonesia to live with her daughter Marcia and 5 grandchildren in Denmark, who had moved there some years earlier. She died in 2004, at the age of 76.

== Work and awards ==
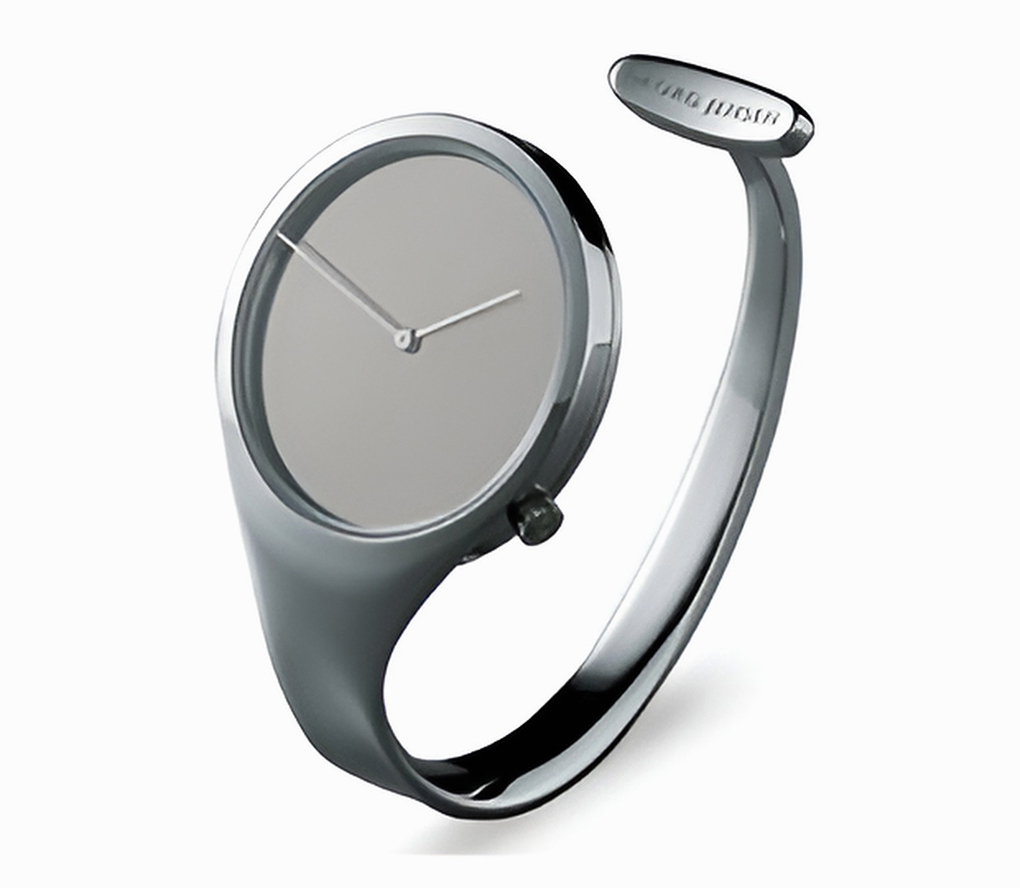
Vivianna watch, created 1962

Throughout her career, Torun worked in Sweden, France, Germany and Indonesia.

In 1948, saying that she didn't want to design jewelry for the wives of wealthy men to keep locked up in private, Torun began making what she called "anti-status jewelry" out of twisted silver wire embellished with crystals and pebbles from the beach. In 1959, she designed the Mobius necklace, which included a lead crystal drop to be draped over the shoulder of the wearer. It was described by Barbara Cartlidge, author of the reference book Twentieth Century Jewelry, as a "milestone in the history of modern jewelry." In 1962, Torun designed a stainless steel bangle-style wristwatch for an exhibition at the Musée des Arts Décoratifs in Paris. It later became the first wristwatch to be produced by the world-renowned Danish silver company Georg Jensen.

In 1960, Torun was awarded a gold medal at the Milan Triennale and also won the American Lunning Prize for design, given annually to innovative Scandinavian designers in their thirties. She subsequently began working with the Danish silver company Georg Jensen A/S, for which she designed exclusively from 1969.

Torun is the designer behind some of the most famous Georg Jensen jewelry designs, including 'Mobius', 'The Vivianna bangle watch/ open watch', 'Beans', 'Forget me knot' and 'Hidden Heart'. She is the second most famous Georg Jensen designer, behind Jensen himself. In 1992 she was awarded the Prince Eugen medal by King Carl XVI Gustaf of Sweden for outstanding artistic achievement. Also in 1992, the Georg Jensen firm held an exhibition honouring 25 years of its association with Torun, 45 years of her work with silver and her 65th birthday. In the same year, the Musée des Arts Décoratifs in the Louvre held a 45-year retrospective of Torun's work.

Torun's jewelry was inspired by natural shapes such as flowers, leaves, swirls and the flow of water. It is described as sober, minimalist and simple. Torun has been praised for her ability to shape solid materials into seemingly flexible forms, so that metal flows like water around the wearer's neck and shoulders. She did not use valuable stones, preferring instead pebbles, granite, rock crystal, moonstone and quartz.

Torun's jewelry has been worn by celebrities including Billie Holiday, Ingrid Bergman, and Brigitte Bardot, and her customers included Pablo Picasso, Chester Himes and Duke Ellington. Her work can be seen in the Museum of Modern Art in New York City, the Swedish National Museum in Stockholm, the Musée des Arts Décoratifs in Montreal, the Louvre in Paris, the Worshipful Company of Goldsmiths in London, and in the Pinakothek der Moderne in Munich. Her jewelry and housewares are sold today by retailers such as Georg Jensen, and Bed Bath & Beyond.
