= Björn Weckström =

Finnish sculptor and jewelry designer

Professori Björn Weckström
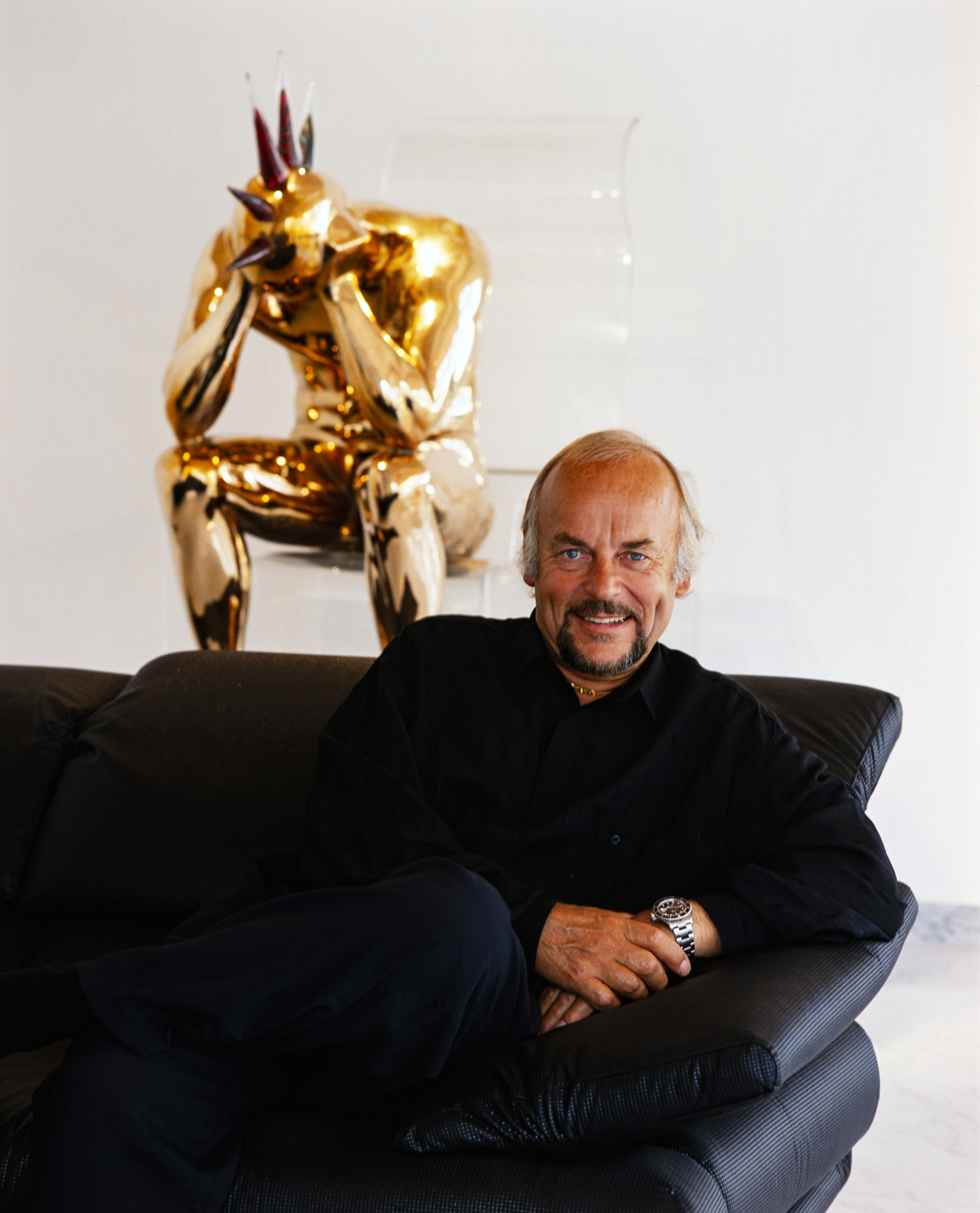
- 1992
- Born: Björn Ragnar Weckström; February 8, 1935; Helsinki
- Occupations: sculptor, designer
- Years active: 1956–
- Notable work: Fazer Rooster statue, 1991; The Whistling City-Dweller statue, 1995

Björn Ragnar Weckström (born February 8, 1935) is a Finnish sculptor and jewelry designer. He graduated from Helsinki Goldsmith’s school in 1956. Since the very beginning of his career, Weckström has been an ambitious designer and artist. At first, his works represented a clean Scandinavian style, but in the 1960s Weckström found his own, a totally new style which is closer to sculpture than traditional goldsmithing.

== Jewelry and glass ==
Rough matt surfaces, uncut semi-precious stones and asymmetrical forms are typical to his golden jewelry. Inspiration comes often from nature. When working in silver, Weckström can for example portray the snowy, Finnish winter landscape with its frozen lakes. Weckström considers jewelry as an art form and his designs as miniature sculptures.

In 1963 Björn Weckström started co-operation with jewelry manufacturer Kruunu-Koru Oy (later Lapponia Jewelry) and its owner Pekka Anttila. Weckström became company’s designer and art director. In 1965 Weckström took part in the International Jewelry Contest in Rio de Janeiro, where his yellowgold and tourmaline necklace “Flowering wall” won the Grand Prix. Through this award, the company received worldwide recognition, launching Lapponia’s international success. His designs have been in continuous production with Lapponia ever since.

Probably the best-known piece of Weckström’s jewelry is necklace Planetoid Valleys which Princess Leia (Carrie Fisher) wore in George Lucas’ film Star Wars in 1977. Necklace was designed for Lapponia in 1969.

Björn Weckström was the first designer who combined silver and acrylic in jewelry. Especially silver-acrylic ring Petrified lake achieved international attention when Yoko Ono was filmed wearing it on the Dick Cavett Show in 1975

For Nuutajärvi glass factory Weckström has designed, inter alia, glassware series “Kanerva” and “Fortuna” and produced dozens of glassworks together with factory’s glassblowers. In 2010s, he worked together with glassblower master Kari Alakoski.

== Sculpture ==
The work of sculptor Bjorn Weckstrom is characterized by a series of work, shaped in materials such as bronze, marble, glass and acrylic resin, as well as in often combinations of the above.

The invitation to become a lecturer at the University of Pisa in 1979, led to a change in his life: thereafter Weckström spent the majority of his time in Italy for 30 years. Inspired by Riace bronzes 1980 Weckström started to make narrative bronze sculptures. His language of expression ranges from abstract form to an individualistic interpretation of realism. Central to the bronze sculptures has been the reinterpretation of classic Greek mythology. Furthermore, the large sculptures, exploring the interaction between man and machine, outline an analysis of the current state of Mankind.

== Public commissions ==
- HYY Group, Kaivopiha, Helsinki: sculpture “Together” 2018
- "The whistling City-dweller"-sculpture, Helsinki 1995
- YLE Headquarters, Helsinki 1993: sculpture "Narcissos" 1993
- Monument in honour of Fazer's 100th Anniversary, Helsinki: "Fazer's rooster" 1991
- Fazer Headquarters, Vantaa: sculpture "Domina" 1989
- Wallrelief for Rettig Strengberg, Turku 1986

== Honours ==
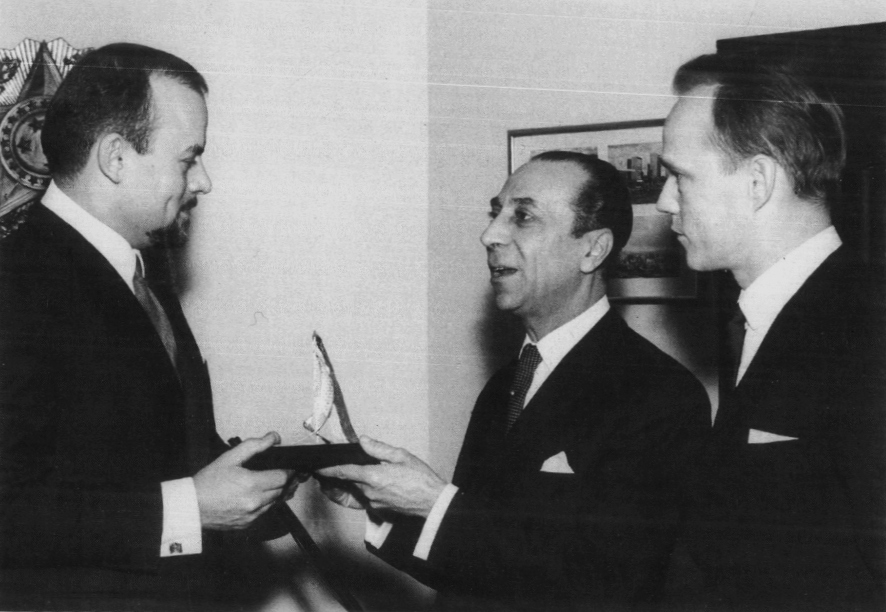
Weckström (left) receiving a jewelry design prize (Grand Prix of Rio de Janeiro 400 years celebration) from the Brazilian ambassador Vincente Paolo Gatti (middle). To the right, goldsmith Pekka Anttila.

- The Finland Prize 2024
- Commander of the Order of the white Rose of Finland 2023
- Cavaliere Ordine della Stella d’Italia 2017
- Espoo City Medal 2016
- Honorific title of Professori 1986
- Pro Finlandia medal 1971
- Winner of the Lunning Prize 1968
- Medal for merit no. 22 of the Finnish Goldsmiths' Association 1967

== Exhibitions ==
More than 60 exhibitions in Europe, USA, Australia and Asia in 1963–2016

Nowadays Björn Weckström lives in Espoo, Finland, but travels to Italy several times a year. He has an atelier both in Finland and in Italy. Bazar publishers has published Weckström’s autobiography Mitt liv som Björn in 2018.
