= Signe Persson-Melin =

Swedish designer (1925–2022)

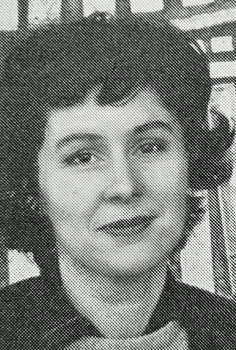
- Born: June 19, 1925; Tomelilla, Sweden
- Died: August 31, 2022 (aged 97)
- Known for: designer

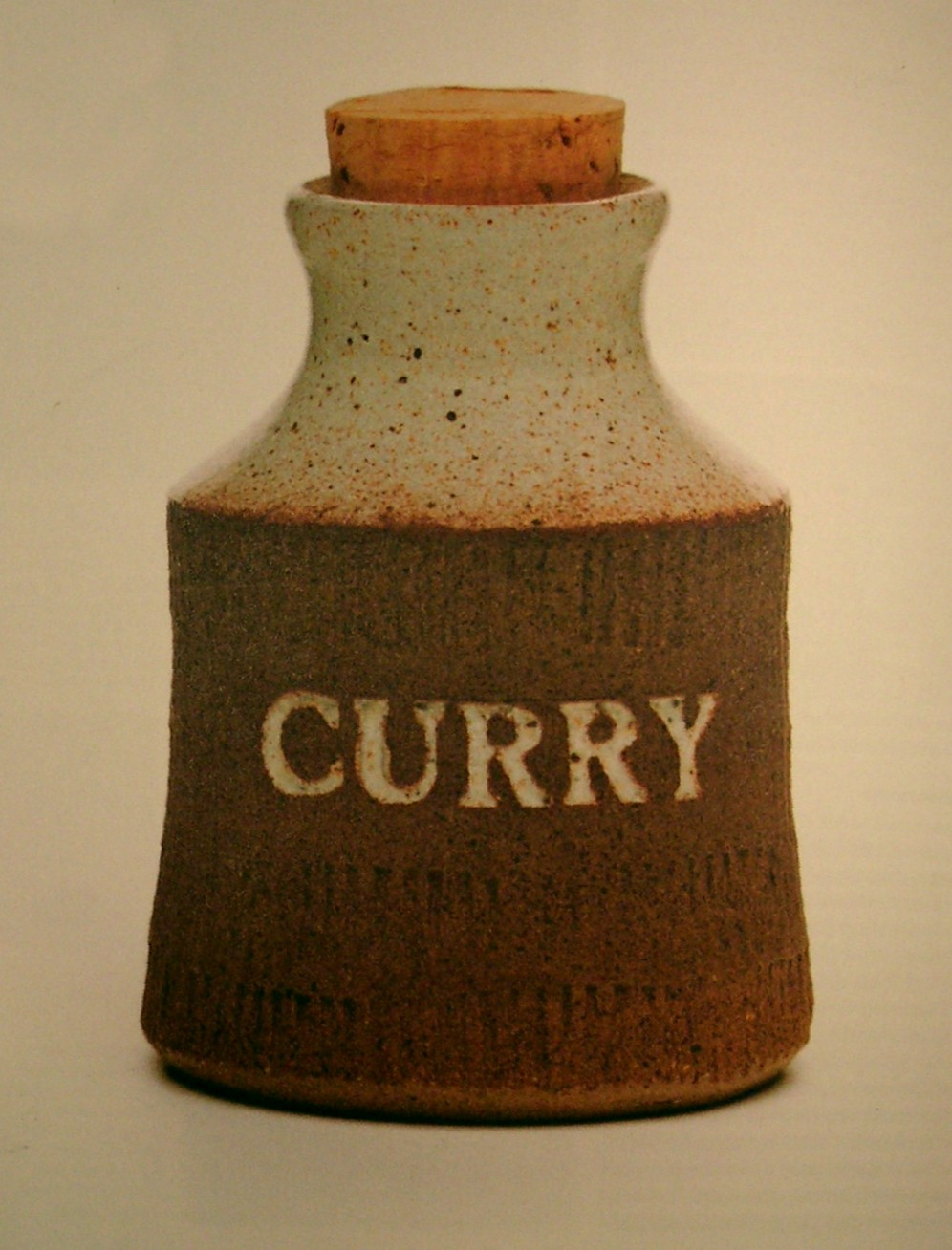
Melin Curry 1955

Signe Persson-Melin (1925–2022) was a Swedish designer. She is known for her work in ceramics and glass design.

Persson-Melin was born on June 19, 1925 in Tomelilla, Sweden. She studied at Konstfack and Kunsthåndværkerskolen. She died on August 31, 2022.

Her work is in the Nationalmuseum, the Cooper Hewitt, and the British Museum.
