= Karin Björquist =

Swedish artist (1927-2018)

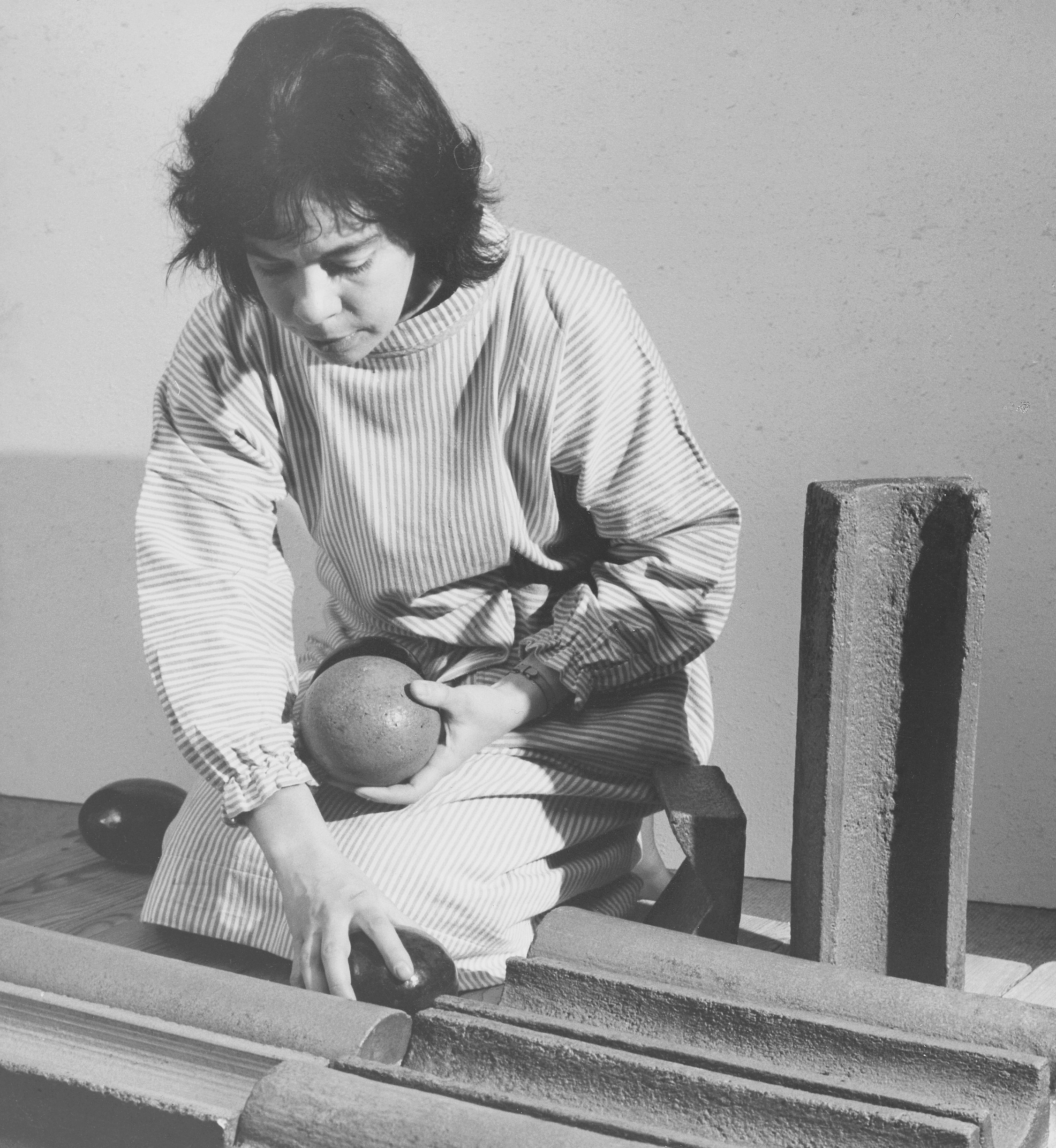
- Born: January 2, 1927; Säffle, Sweden
- Died: September 2, 2018 (aged 91); Stockholm, Sweden
- Known for: Ceramics

Karin Björquist (1927-2018) was a Swedish designer and ceramicist.

Björquist was born on January 2, 1927 in Säffle, Sweden . She studied at Konstfack University. she worked in various capacities at the Gustavsberg porcelain company from the early 1940s through 1994. She started her career there as a decorations painter. From 1981 through 1986 she was the konstnärliga ledare (artistic director). She designed several dinner ware sets including Kobolt, Svart Ruter, and Vardag. She is known for the tableware designed for the Nobel Prize banquet in 1991. Björquist was also known for her architectural ceramics.

Björquist died on September 2, 2018 in Stockholm. In 2021 the Nationalmuseum held an exhibition of her work entitled Karin Björquist – en tanke tar form.

Her work is in the collection of the Victoria and Albert Museum.
