= List of Scandinavian textile artists =

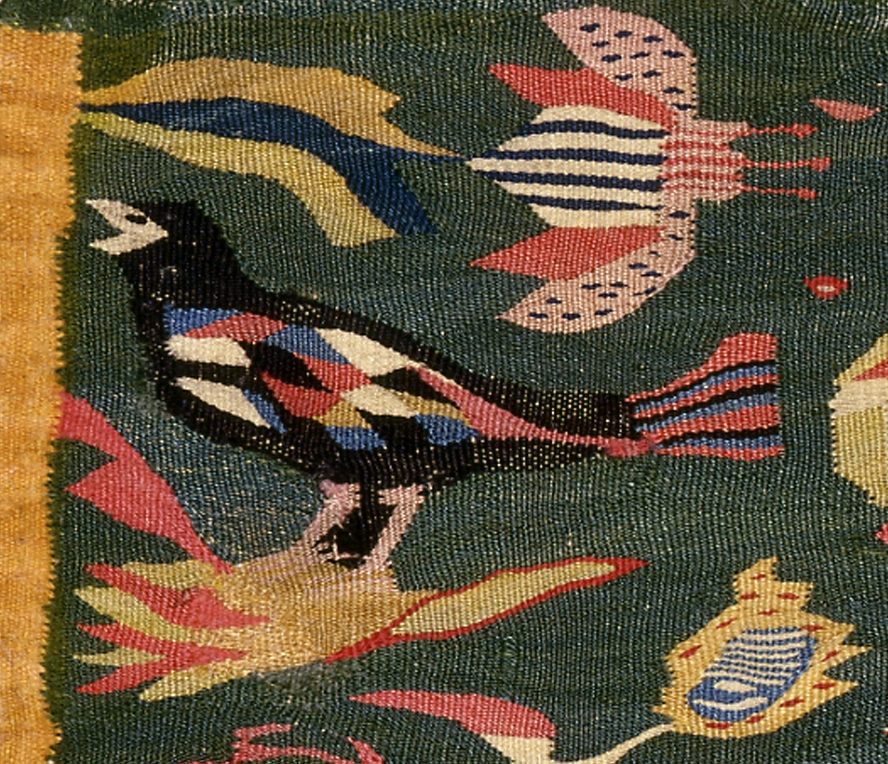
Detail from late 18th-century Swedish textile artwork

This is a list of textile artists who were born in Scandinavia (including Finland), or whose artworks are closely associated with that region.

The countries of Scandinavia have a long history of textile art, especially Sweden and Denmark. For centuries, country women created their own fabrics with designs which were often inspired by nature. By the early 20th century, artists became famous for their pile rugs, while after the Second World War, brightly coloured Scandinavian textile designs became popular across Europe and in the United States.

== A ==
- Gudrun Stig Aagaard (1895–1986), Danish textile artist
- Louise Adelborg (1885–1971), Swedish porcelain designer and textile artist
- Maria Adelborg (1849–1940), Swedish textile artist
- Lis Ahlmann (1894–1979), Danish weaver and textile designer
- Maja Andersson Wirde (1873–1952), Swedish textile artist
- Astrid Andreasen (born 1948), Faroese textile and graphic artist
- Synnøve Anker Aurdal (1908–2000), Norwegian textile artist

== B ==
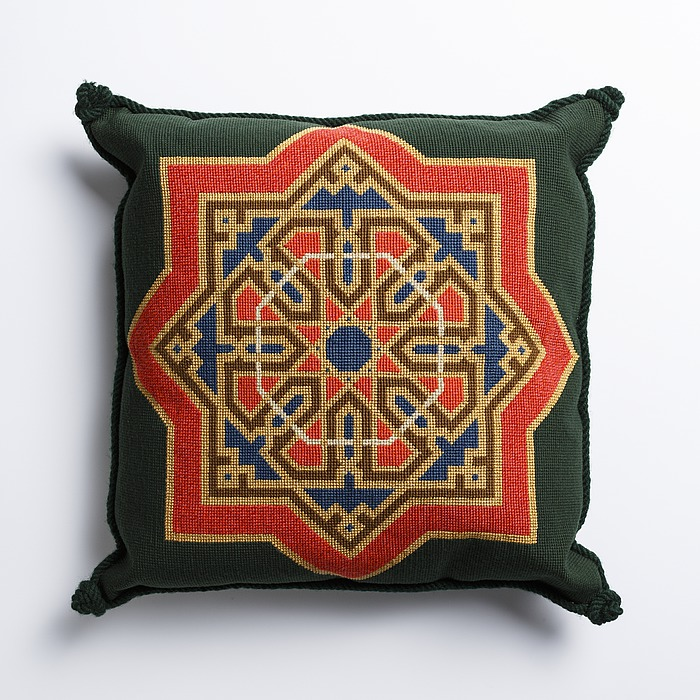
Cushion embroidered by Johanne Bindesbøll

- Gerda Bengtsson (1900–1995), Danish textile artist
- Elisabeth Bergstrand-Poulsen (1887–1955), Swedish writer, painter and textile artist
- Johanne Bindesbøll (1851–1934), Danish textile artist
- Anna Boberg (1864–1935), Swedish painter, ceramist, textile artist
- Anna Sofie Boesen Dreijer (1899–1986), textile artist specializing in dance costumes
- Agnes Branting (1862–1930), Swedish textile artist
- Johanna Brunsson (1846–1920), Swedish textile artist and educator

== C ==
- Bodil Cappelen (born 1930), Norwegian painter, textile artist and illustrator
- Anna Casparsson (1861–1961), Swedish textile artist, embroiderer
- Anna Christina Cronquist (1807–1893), Swedish weaver and entrepreneur

== D ==
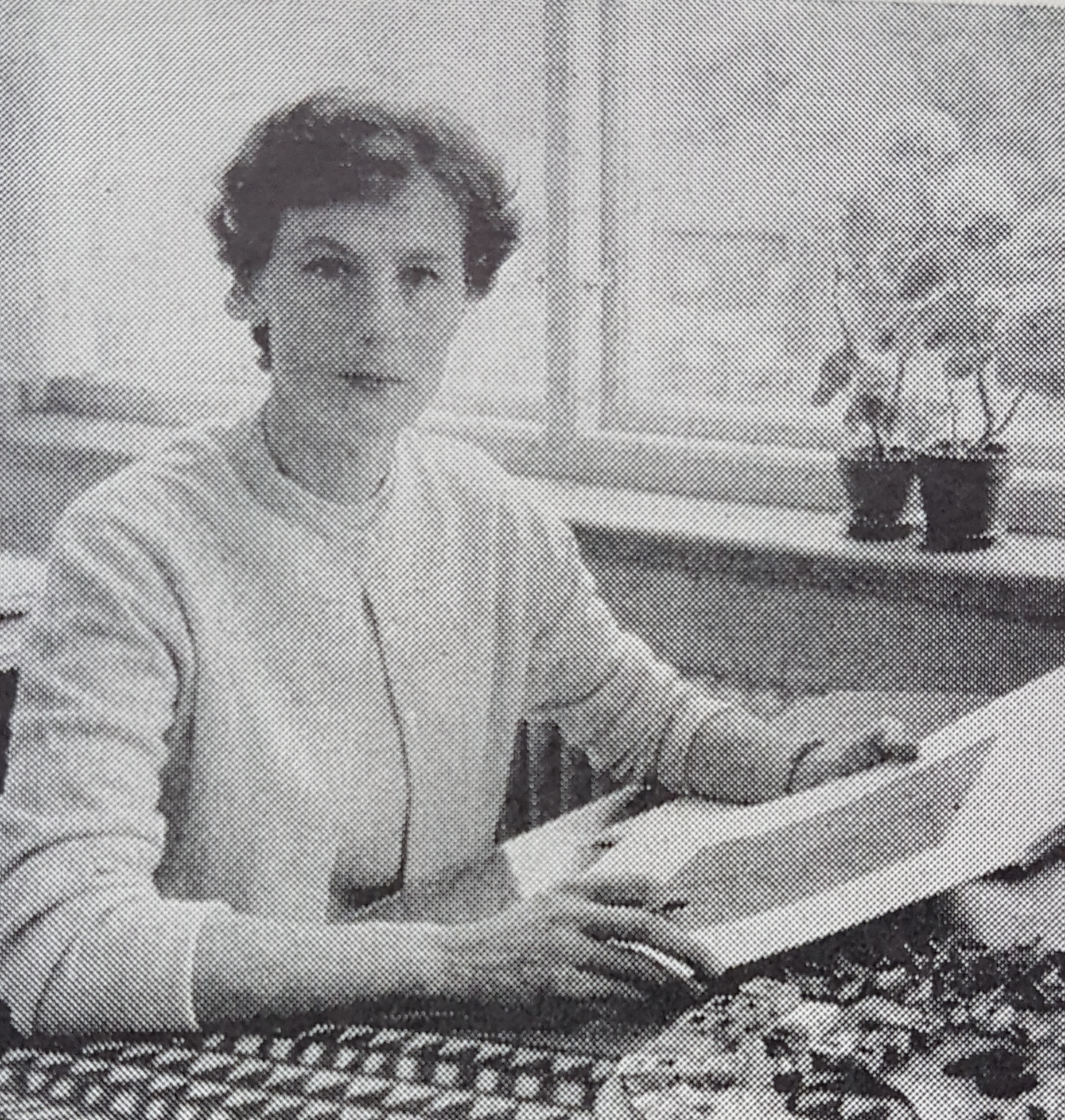
Ingrid Dessau

- Ingrid Dessau (1923–2000), Swedish textile artist
- Margrete Drejer (1889–1975), Danish textile artist
- Brita Drewsen (1887–1983), Swedish textile artist active in Denmark

== E ==
- Annika Ekdahl (born 1955), Swedish textile artist
- Merete Erbou Laurent (born 1949), Danish weaver and textile artist
- Lisa Erlandsdotter (1774–1854), Swedish tapestry maker
- Bengta Eskilsson (1836–1923), Swedish textile artist
- Ulla Eson Bodin (1935–2009), Swedish textile artist and designer

== F ==
- Emy Fick (1876–1959), Swedish textile artist and businesswoman
- Pauline Fjelde (1861–1923), Norwegian-American painter and textile artist
- Ellinor Flor (born 1946), Norwegian textile artist
- Helga Foght (1902–1974), Danish textile artist
- Elisabeth Forsell (fl. 1740s), Swedish weaver
- Einar Forseth (1892–1988), Swedish mosaic and textile artist

== G ==
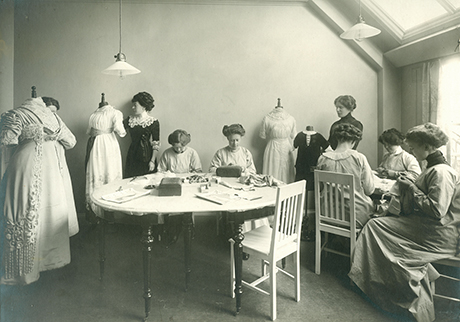
Elisabeth Glantzberg's Britta School

- Märtha Gahn (1881–1973), Swedish textile artist
- Sophia Magdalena Gardelius (1804–1881), Swedish weaver
- Esther Gehlin (1892–1949), Danish-Swedish painter and textile artist
- Sofia Gisberg (1824–1926), textile artist, sculptor and educator
- Elisabeth Glantzberg (1873–1951), Swedish textile artist
- Thyra Grafström (1864–1925), Swedish textile artist
- Viola Gråsten (1910–1994), Swedish-Finnish textile designer
- Ulrikke Greve (1868–1951), Norwegian textile artist

== H ==
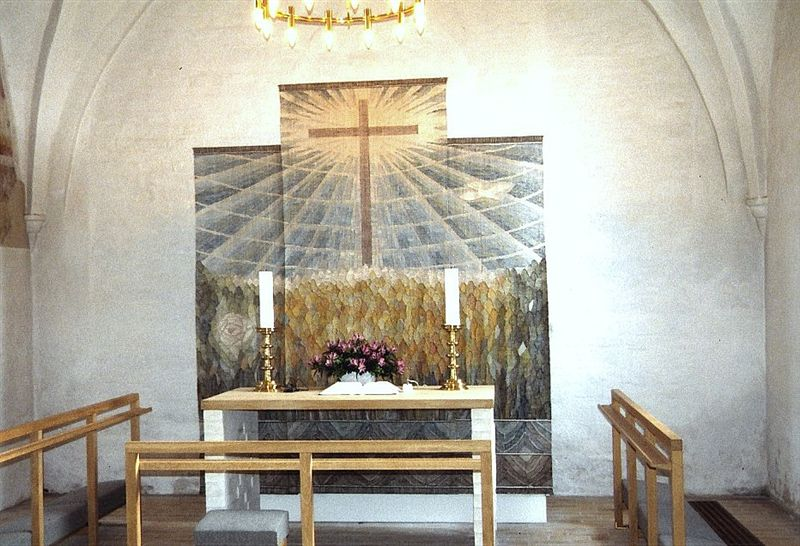
Church decorations by Berit Hjelholt

- Elisabeth Haarr (born 1945), Norwegian textile artist
- Margrethe Hald (1897–1982), Danish textile researcher
- Bente Hammer (born 1950), Danish textile artist and fashion designer
- Frida Hansen (1855–1931), Norwegian textile artist
- Gerda Henning (1891–1951), Danish weaver and textile designer
- Helena Hietanen (born 1963), Finnish textile artist
- Berit Hjelholt (1920–2016), Finnish-born Danish textile artist
- Astrid Holm (1876–1937), Danish painter and textile artist
- Rose-Marie Huuva (born 1943), Swedish textile artist, poet

== I ==
- Kirsti Ilvessalo (1920–2019), Finnish textile artist

== J ==
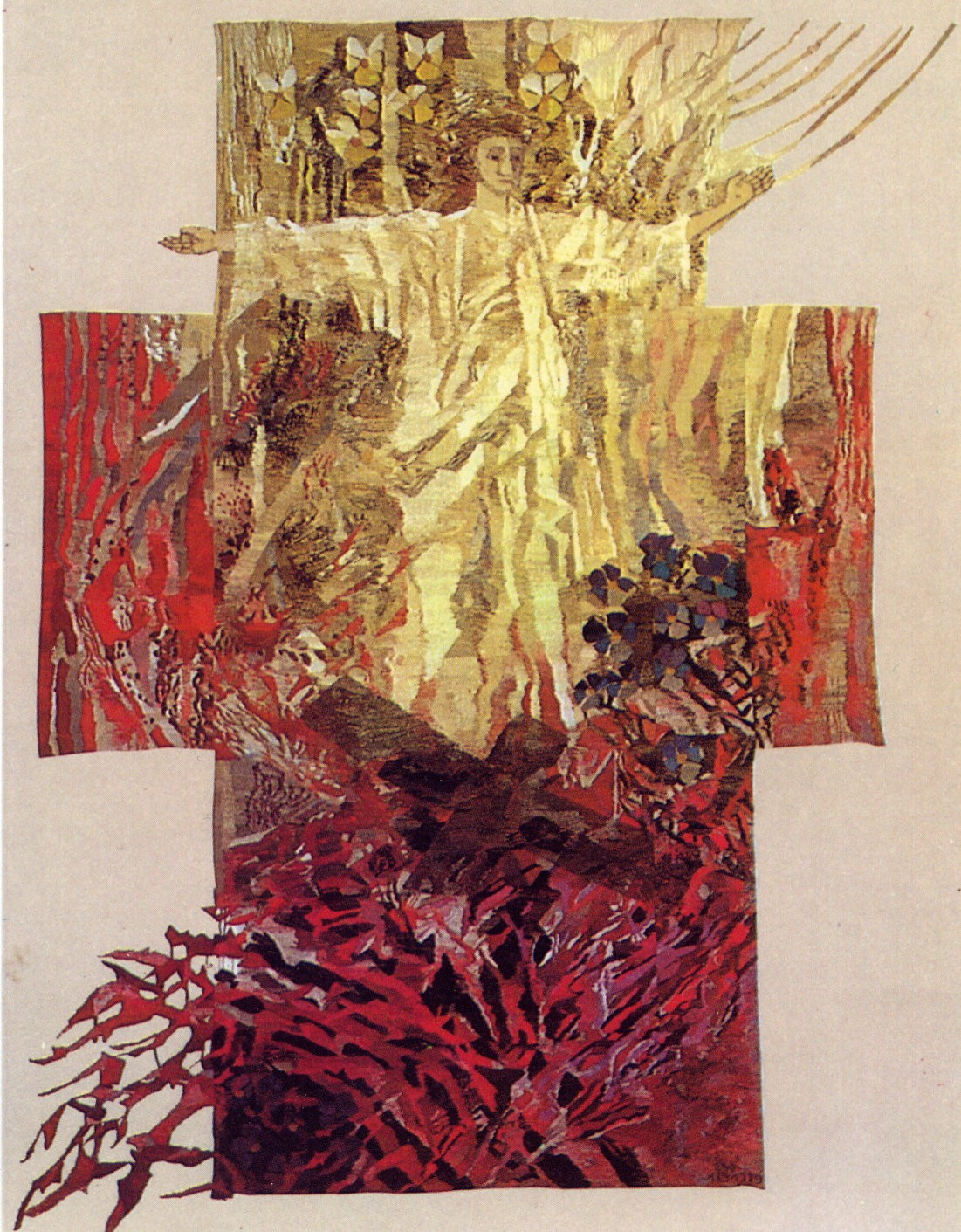
Tapestry by Else Marie Jakobsen

- Emma Jacobsson (1883–1977), Austrian-born Swedish textile designer and entrepreneur
- Else Marie Jakobsen (1927–2012), Norwegian designer, textile artist
- Raija Jokinen (born 1960), Finnish artist and textile designer

== K ==
- Bodil Kaalund (1930–2016), Danish painter, textile artist, church decorator
- Brita-Kajsa Karlsdotter (1816–1915), Swedish textile artist
- Vibeke Klint (1927–2019), Danish textile artist
- Kristiane Konstantin-Hansen (1848–1925), Danish textile artist
- Ann-Mari Kornerup (1918–2006), Swedish-Danish textile artist
- Holcha Krake (1885–1944), Swedish textile artist
- Hans Krondahl (1929–2018), Swedish painter and textile artist
- Thora Kulle (1849–1939), Swedish textile artist and businesswoman

== L ==
- Jenny la Cour (1849–1928), Danish textile artist and educator
- Gunilla Lagerbielke (1926–2013), Swedish textile artist
- Marie Gudme Leth (1895–1997), Danish textile designer pioneering screen printing

== M ==
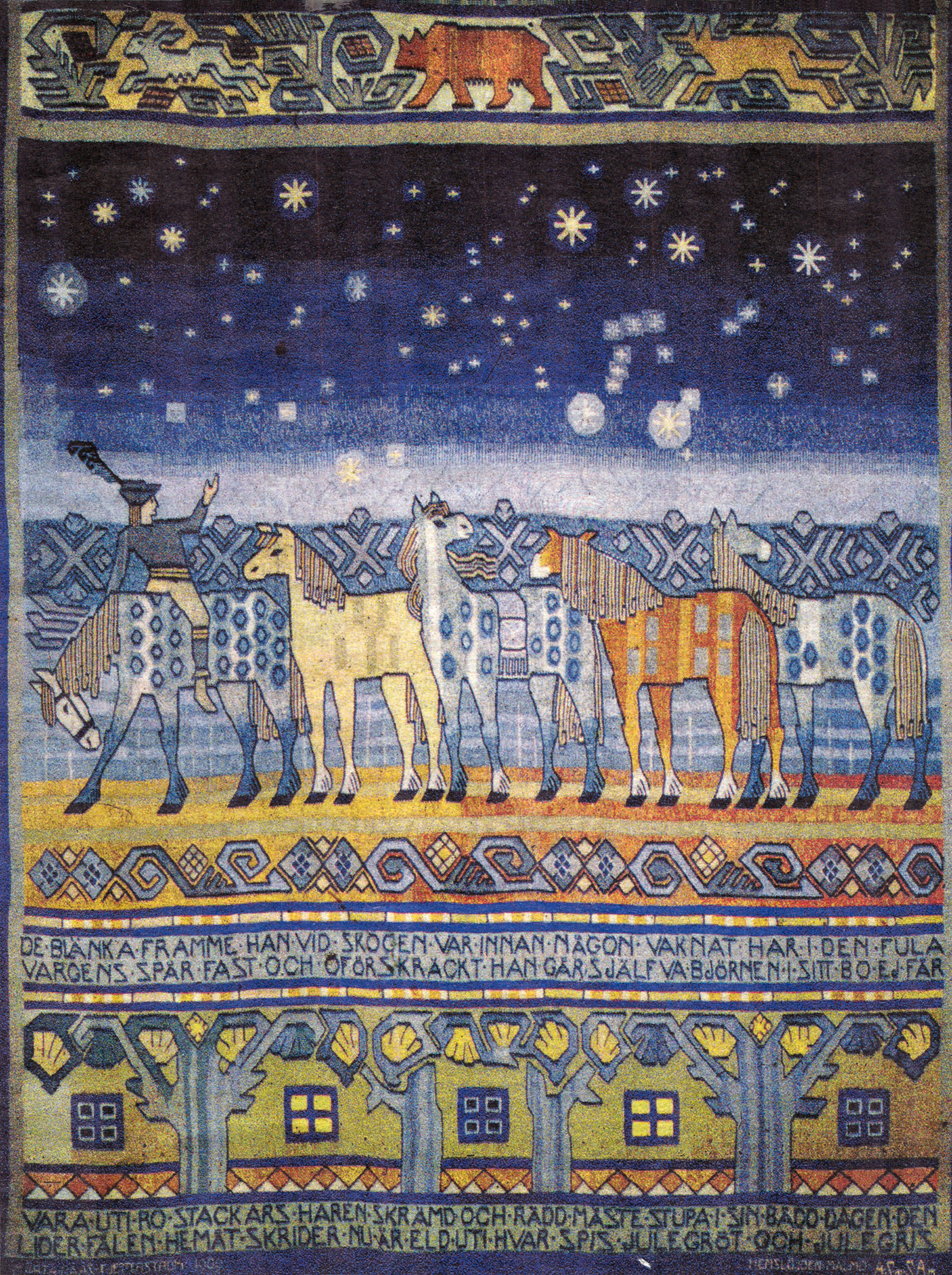
Tapestry by Märta Måås-Fjetterström

- Märta Måås-Fjetterström (1873–1941), Swedish textile artist
- Britta Marakatt-Labba (born 1951), Swedish Sámi textile artist
- Kaisa Melanton (1920–2012), Swedish textile artist
- Ulrika Melin (1767–1834), Swedish textile artist

== N ==
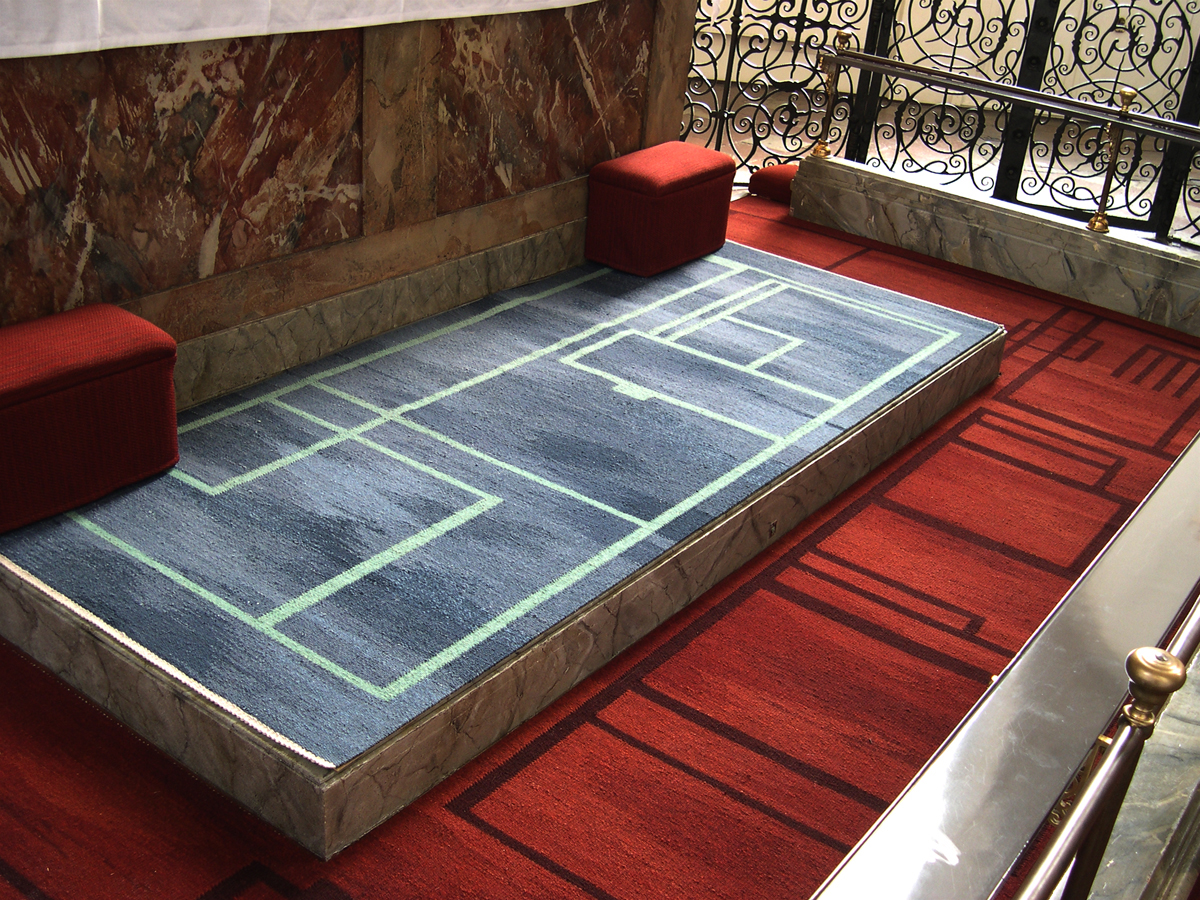
Altar Carpet by Martin Nannestad Jørgensen in Trinitatis Church, Copenhagen, Denmark

- Martin Nannestad Jørgensen (born 1959), visual artist working mainly with textiles
- Kim Naver (born 1940), Danish designer and textile artist
- Elna M. de Neergaard (1872–1946), Danish-American weaver and occupational therapist
- Barbro Nilsson (1899–1983), Swedish textile artist
- Ernestine Nyrop (1888–1975), textile artist and fresco painter

== O ==
- Maria Elisabet Öberg (1734–1808), Finnish weaver and textile artist
- Cilluf Olsson (1847–1916), Swedish textile artist
- Agda Österberg (1891–1987), Swedish textile artist

== P ==
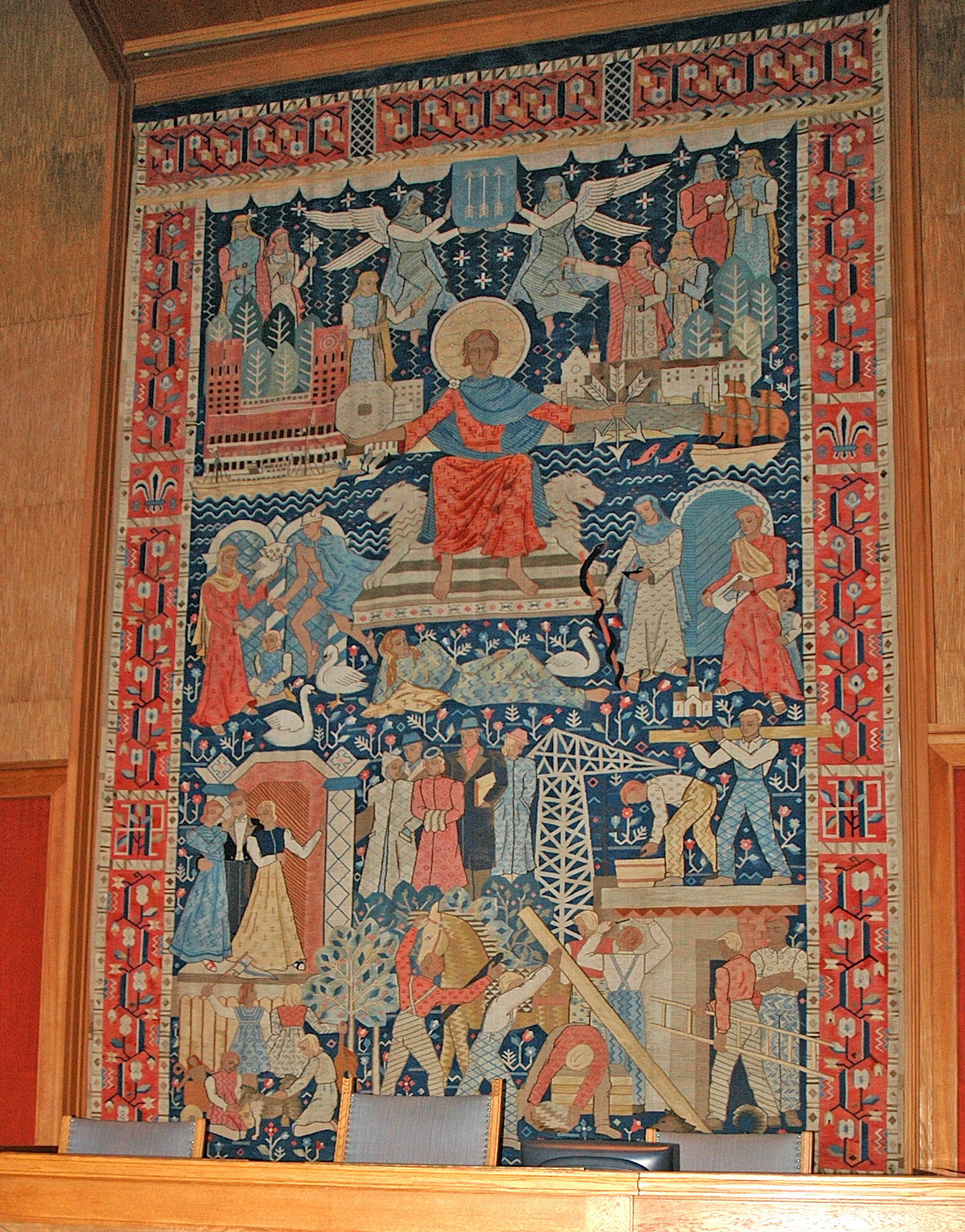
Else Poulsson's tapestry in Oslo City Hall

- Else Poulsson (1909–2002), Norwegian painter, textile artist

== R ==
- Franka Rasmussen (1907–1994), German-born Danish textile artist
- Marianne Richter (1916–2010), Swedish textile artist
- Maria Rønning (1741–1807), Norwegian-Faroese weaver
- Hannah Ryggen (1894–1970), Swedish-Norwegian textile artist

== S ==
Design by Marianne Strengel

- Loja Saarinen (1879–1968), Finnish-American textile artist
- Bente Sætrang (born 1846), Danish textile artist
- Naja Salto (1945–2016), Danish textile artist
- Anna Sarauw (1839–1919), Danish textile artist
- Brigitta Scherzenfeldt (1684–1736), Swedish writer and weaving teacher
- Anna Maria Schmilau (died 1725), Swedish tapestry artist
- Anna Brita Sergel (1733–1819), Swedish textile artist
- Maja Sjöström (1868–1961), Swedish textile artist
- Georgia Skovgaard (1828–1868), Danish embroiderer
- Grethe Sørensen (born 1947), Danish textile artist
- Wendela Gustafva Sparre (1772–1855), Swedish textile artist
- Dagmar Starcke (1899–1975), Danish textile artist
- Ulla Stenberg (1792–1858), Swedish textile artist
- Gustava Johanna Stenborg (1776–1819), Swedish textile artist
- Gudrun Stig Aagaard (1895–1986), Danish textile designer
- Marianne Strengell (1909–1998), Finnish-American textile designer
- Júlíana Sveinsdóttir (1889–1966), early Icelandic female painter, textile artist
- Sigrid Synnergren (1894–1986), Swedish textile artist

== T ==
- Jette Thyssen (born 1933), Danish textile artist
- Paula Trock (1889–1979), Danish weaver, textile artist

== U ==
- Hedvig Ulfsparre (1877–1963), Swedish textile collector
- Lin Utzon (born 1946), Danish ceramist, textile artist

== V ==
- Hanne Vedel (born 1933), Danish weaver
- Fredrika Eleonora von Düben (1738–1808), Swedish textile artist

== W ==
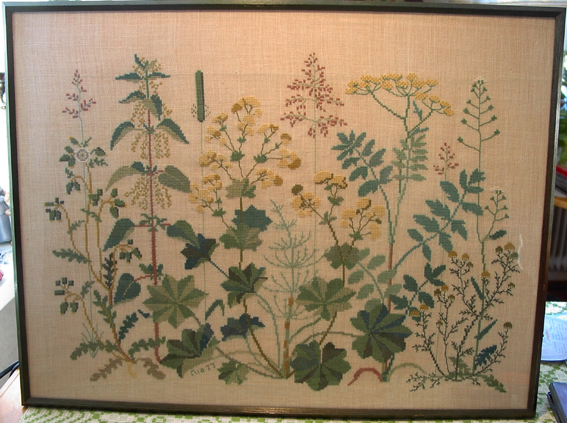
Embroidered panel by Clara Wæver

- Clara Wæver (1855–1930), Danish embroiderer
- Gertie Wandel (1894–1988), Danish textile artist
- Lise Warburg (born 1932), Danish textile artist and writer
- Carin Wästberg (1859–1942), Swedish textile artist
- Maria Widebeck (1858–1929), Swedish textile artist
- Ida Winckler (1907–1995), Danish textile artist, specializing in embroidery
- Hanna Winge (1838–1896), Swedish painter and textile artist

== Z ==
- Margaretha Zetterberg (1773–1803), Finnish textile and crafts artist
- Lilli Zickerman (1858–1949), Swedish textile artist
