= Haandarbejdets Fremme =

Danish handcraft guild

Haandarbejdets Fremme, known in English as the Danish Handcraft Guild, was established on 20 March 1928 to promote Danish textile art and provide support to all those working with embroidery. This was achieved by arranging exhibitions, lectures and courses, by coordinating purchasing and marketing opportunities, and by publishing design guides including Årets Korssting, the annual cross-stitch calendar. For over 70 years, the guild has provided access to cross-stitch kits and designs, many of which were created by the artists Gerda Bengtsson, Ida Winckler and Mads Stage.

== History ==
Thanks mainly to initiatives taken by Gertie Wandel who was active until she retired as president in 1978, the society developed into an effective organization with its own workshop, and a network of retail outlets and training facilities across Denmark. From the beginning, it enjoyed the support of the royal family, including Queen Alexandrine and Queen Ingrid. Queen Alexandrine attended a Haandarbejdets Fremme exhibition in 1939 while Queen Margrethe, who has contributed many embroidery designs to the organization, together with Crown Princess Mary, attended the 90th-anniversary celebrations on 20 March 2018 in Greve Museum.

A considerable number of artists have contributed to the organization over the years. The major contributors have been Gerda Bengtsson, Ida Wincklet and Edith Hansen who have all worked on the premises and presented training courses. Others include Mogens Koch, Dagmar Starcke, Ann-Mari Kornerup, Naja Salto and Mads Stage, the weavers Gerda Henning, Vibeke Klint, Lis Ahlmann and Kim Naver, the textile printers Gudrun Stig Aagaard and Marie Gudme Leth, as well as the painter and ceramist Bjørn Wiinblad.
