= Lars J. Benzelstierna =

Swedish photographer (1808–1880)

Personal details
- Born: December 8, 1808 Stockholm, Sweden
- Died: February 11, 1880 (aged 71) Kristianstad, Sweden–Norway

Military service
- Branch/service: French Army (1831–1836) Swedish Army (1836–18??)
- Years of service: 1831–18??
- Rank: Underlöjtnant

Lars Jesper Benzelstierna (December 8, 1808– February 11, 1880) was a Swedish Army officer and amateur daguerreotypist. He was the first Swedish photographer and a member of the Benzelstierna clan.

== Biography ==
Benzelstierna's father was Jesper Albrekt Benzelstierna, an Army officer and commander of coastal fortifications in Karlshamn.

From 1831 to 1836, Benzelstierna served as a second lieutenant in the French Army. He developed an interest in art while in Paris and had the opportunity to study graphic design, specializing in lithography. In Paris, he met and became good friends with the Swedish minister there, Gustaf Löwenhielm. In 1836, Benzelstierna returned to Sweden and served as a second lieutenant in the North Scanian Infantry Regiment and as an adjutant at the War College.

At the turn of the year 1840, Löwenhielm brought a number of daguerreotypes with him on a visit home to Sweden. Most of them were damaged during the journey, but one that survived was exhibited in February 1840 at the Royal Museum. Löwenhielm had also purchased daguerreotype equipment as a gift for Benzelstierna, but due to an error in shipping the equipment ended up in Guadeloupe instead of Sweden. Löwenhielm quickly bought another set and had it delivered to Benzelstierna, who was soon busy taking photographs.

In the course of Benzelstierna's photographic experiments, he nearly blinded his model, the actor Georg Dahlqvist, by asking him to position himself in such a way that he had to stare directly into the sun during a 5-minute exposure.

As early as the fall of 1840, Benzelstierna had published a series of plates entitled Daguerreotype Panorama of Stockholm and its Environs (Daguerrotyp-Panorama öfver Stockholm och dess omgifningar). Johan Christoffer Boklund prepared photogravures based on Benzelstierna's plates for a four-volume photobook, but only one volume was published due to poor sales.

In the spring of 1841, Benzelstierna presented his photographic experiments to Crown Prince Oscar. Because competition from other photographers in Stockholm had by this time become fierce, Benzelstierna decided to set out on a tour of the country, visiting Norrköping, Linköping, Helsingborg, and Kristianstad. Benzelstierna ultimately fell behind other photographers of the time, mainly because his specialty of landscapes required wide-angle objectives unsuitable for portraits, the main source of business for early photographers. By 1845 he had given up photography entirely, making a living until his death by producing lithographs and wax reliefs.
