= Ida Winckler =

Danish textile artist

- Born: May 20, 1907; Frederiksberg
- Died: 1995
- Known for: painter, textile artist
- Movement: Danish Handcraft Guild

Ida Anna Winkler (1907–1995) was a Danish painter and textile artist. In 1930, she joined the newly established Haandarbejdets Fremme (Danish Handcraft Guild), where over the next 65 years she created hundreds of mainly cross-stitch patterns. They have been widely used not only in Denmark but also in Germany, the United States, and Japan. She also contributed to some embroidery guides, some in English, published from the 1950s to the 1970s.

== Early life and education ==
Born on 20 May 1907 in the Copenhagen district of Frederiksberg, Ida Anna Winckler was the daughter of Peter Johan Winckler (1862–1953), a sea captain, and Anna Elise Bornholm (1869–1907). Her artistic talents were developed at the Tegne- og Kunstindustriskolen for Kvinder (Arts and Crafts School for Women) under Margrete Drejer and Gunnar Biilmann Petersen. Drejer introduced her to both Danish and foreign styles of sewing and embroidery, including complex techniques such as goldwork. On receiving her diploma in 1928, Winckler remained at the school as a teacher, developing embroidery patterns, especially for whitework, for use as educational aids in high schools.

== Career ==
In 1930, Winckler gained employment at the newly established Danish Handcraft Guild where for the next 65 years she created hundreds of embroidery patterns that were widely used both in Denmark and in countries such as Germany, the United States, and Japan. They were intended principally for decorating the home, consisting of wall panels, tablecloths, and Christmas items, but they also covered handbags finely embroidered in silks. Her early work represented patterns for reproducing traditional work such as 17th-century silk-embroidered canvas and 19th-century rural whitework. Later, much of her work was more freely designed, as she began to create simpler patterns, especially for cross stitch which became popular after the Second World War. Here Winckler became a major contributor, creating artistically presented patterns, often with intricate detail. Her cross-stitch patterns for houses are of particular note, as are her representations of the coats of arms of Danish and Swedish cities.

Her patterns were based on watercolour paintings or colour photographs of the scenes or objects she intended to reproduce. She had a gift for selecting appropriately coloured threads and for emphasizing the most important features. She also managed to give her work a modern look. Her many published works testify to her diligent approach, overcoming the limitations of the availability of only about 80 available colours for cross stitch. Together with Gerda Bengtsson, she developed a colour-identification system, indicating on a black-and-white pattern which colours should be used for the different sections.

From the 1970s, Winckler collaborated with Anna Sofie Boesen Dreijer in developing sewing patterns for embroidering traditional folk costumes for Foreningen til Folkedansens Fremme, a folk dance association.

Ida Winckler died on 4 April 1995 in Copenhagen.

== Publications ==
Ida Winckler has contributed to a number of sewing guides in Danish and other languages. The following are in English:

- Fangel, Esther; Winckler, Ida; Madsen, Agnete Wuldem (1953). Danish Pulled Thread Embroidery: With English and Danish Text. Courier Corporation. ISBN 978-0-486-23474-8.
- Madsen, Agnete Wuldem; Winckler, Ida (1962). Birthday calendar: Designed hy Agnete Wuldem Madsen and Ida Winckler. Haandarbejdets Fremme.
- Winckler, Ida (1967). Jul. Christmas: Tilrettelagt af Ida Winckler. Tegnet af Gerda Bengtsson, Else Thordur Hansen, Lisbeth Kjeldgaard Sørensen og Ida Winckler. Selskabet til Haandarbejdets Fremme, (Høst).
