= Helga Foght =

Danish textile artist

Helga Elisabeth Foght (11 December 1902 – 23 November 1974) was a Danish textile artist who specialized in calico printing. She opened her own screen-printing workshop in 1937, first creating floral designs but later adopting a more abstract or strip-based approach. Many of her designs were used for commercial production by the L.F. Foght textile company. Foght taught at the Danish Arts and Crafts School until 1970.

== Early life and education ==
Born on 11 December 1902 in Copenhagen, Helga Foght was the daughter of the book dealer Villiam Rudolf Foght (1866–1951) and Dagmar Elise Kirstine Clausen (1875–1951). After being trained as a housekeeping teacher, she worked as a secretary at Askov Højskole, a folk high school, where she met Margrethe Christiansen (1895–1971) and Charlotte Rud (1906–1993) who were both intent on improving coverage of sewing and textile arts at the school. As a result, in 1934 she decided to improve her own competence in embroidery by taking a course in decorative art at Kunsthåndværkerskolen, the Danish Arts and Crafts School. In fact, the school arranged for her to study embroidery at the Haandarbejdets Fremme textile establishment. She was also introduced to the new technique of calico printing in which she became particularly interested. She improved her knowledge of the subject by taking a course on screen printing in Berlin. At the Danish Arts and Crafts School, she also learnt woodblock printing under Marie Gudme Leth.

== Career ==
In 1937, Foght established her own studio where she worked with woodblock for smaller patterns and screen printing for covering cloth breadths of up to about one metre. After producing her own designs for a number of years, she began to collaborate with L.F Foght, a commercial textile establishment which was run by her father's cousin, himself an accomplished designer. This proved useful for her artistic development as she was able to experiment with more efficient approaches to pattern making, colour and materials.

Foght teamed up with a number of designers and architects to decorate restaurants and other large interiors with her curtains, upholstery and other fabrics. They were well suited to the Functionalist furniture of the times. Her designs became more rhythmical and less naturalistic than those taught at the Arts and Crafts School, eventually becoming almost entirely abstract, while displaying intricate detail. As a teacher (1952–70), she encouraged hundreds of students to experiment with new designs, colour combinations and materials.

She also played an important part in Denmark's cultural sector, serving in a number of administrative positions where she emphasized the importance of developing textile arts. She contributed journal articles on the subject, especially in connection with calico print and arranged hundreds of exhibitions throughout Denmark.

Helga Foght died in Gentofte on 23 November 1974.

== Awards ==
Helga Foght received a number of grants and scholarships for her work. In 1951, she received a gold medal at the Milan Triennial IX, while in 1970, she was honoured as a Knight of the Dannebrog for her pioneering contributions to Danish textile art.
