= Kim Naver =

Danish textile artist

Karen-Margrethe (Kim) Naver (born 1940) is a Danish designer and textile artist, specializing in weaving and tapestry. Inspired by both coarse Polish techniques and patterns and materials from the Orient, she has been successful in creating textiles for industrial furniture manufacturers (Cotil, Paustian), as well as for domestic use (Royal Copenhagen). She is recognized as one of Denmark's leading figures in Danish modern textile art. Her silver jewellery designs have been marketed by Georg Jensen A/S.

== Biography ==
Born in the Frederiksberg district of Copenhagen on 24 June 1940, Karen-Margrethe Naver is the daughter of the book dealer Rasmus Peder Pedersen Naver (1894–1976) and Christine Paula Claudia Oehlerich Petersen (1900–53). After matriculating from Øster Borgerdyd Gymnasium, in 1959 she moved to Paris where she studied history of art at the École du Louvre. On returning to Denmark, she attended Skolen for Boligindretning (Interior Design School) where she decided she wanted to make a career in textiles. In 1962, she became an apprentice with Lis Ahlmann, one of the most distinguished weavers of the day. A talented student, Naver mastered the various sewing and embroidery techniques so quickly that she was able to exhibit work at the Charlottenborg Spring Exhibition in 1963.

The same year, she married the actor Peter Steen, giving birth to her first child Morten in 1964. She continued her education with Vibeke Klint, progressing to the stage where she was able to open her own workshop in 1966. The designs she had created as an apprentice were brought by the textile company Cotil for commercial production. Naver went on to win the Cotil Prize in 1969 and the Lunning Prize in 1970.

Around that time, Naver began experimenting with the coarser Polish weaving styles which had gained popularity, adopting new colours and widening her freedom of expression. In 1973, she met her second husband, the architect Mogens Breyen. Together they travelled to the Far East where she was inspired to adopt the intricate patterns and fine materials she discovered there. Her subsequent work, exhibited in a solo exhibition at the Danish Design Museum, initiated a new trend in decorative Danish textile art.

In the late 1970s and the 1980s, Naver served on several influential boards, including the Danish Arts Foundation, the School of Applied Arts and the Danish Handcraft Council. She was also a consultant to Haandarbejdets Fremme which played an important role in promoting Danish textile design. She also contributed textile designs to Royal Copenhagen and created silverware for Georg Jensen.

Among Naver's most important works are her five large tapestries in Danmarks Nationalbank, complementing Arne Jacobsen's architecture (1979), and the circular flat-woven rug she designed for A.P. Møller's headquarters (1980).

== Awards ==
Among Naver's many scholarships and awards are the Thorvald Bindesbøll Medal and the Order of the Dannebrog.
