= Thora Kulle =

Swedish artist (1849–1939)

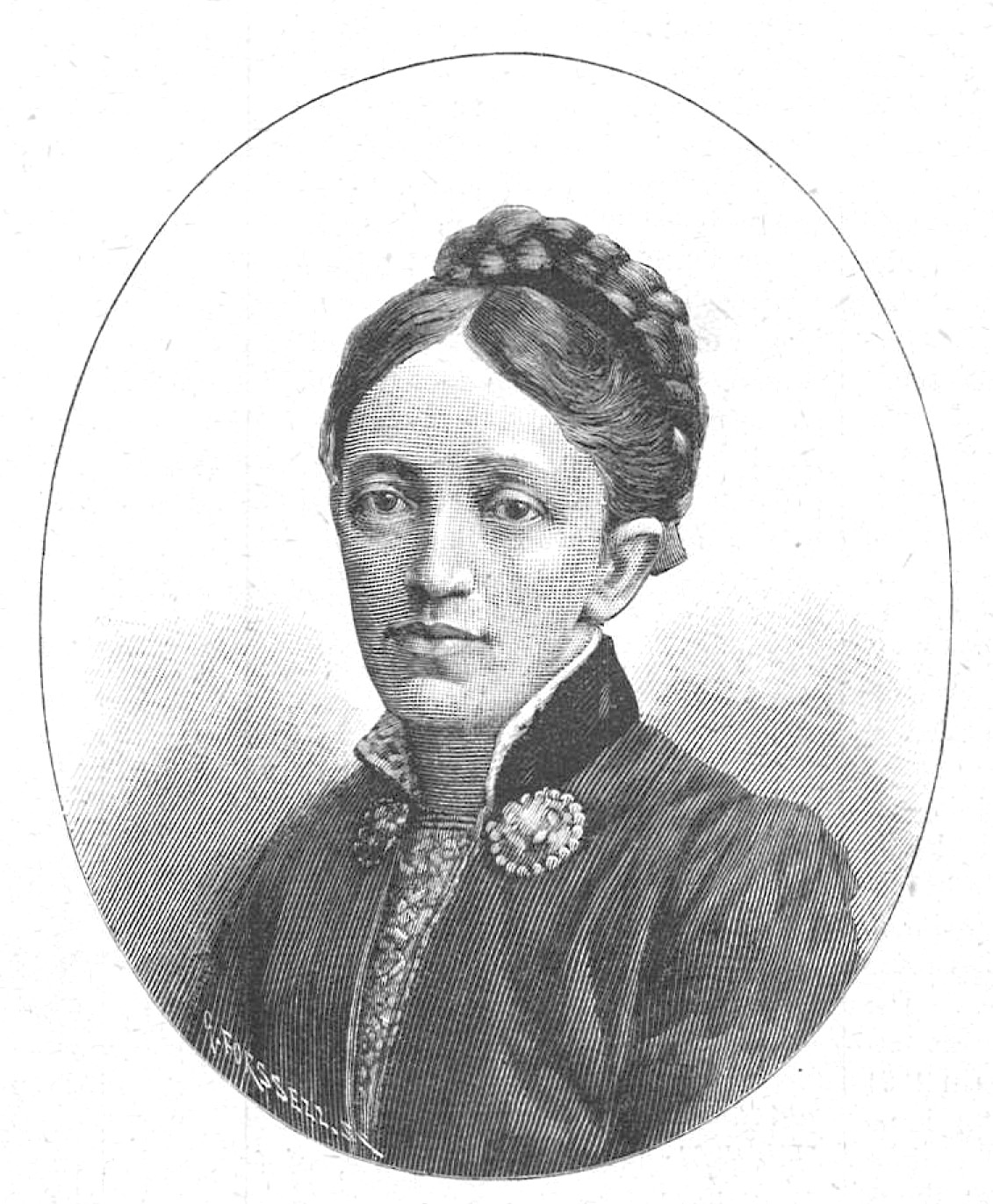
Thora Kulle (1890)

Thora Kulle née Nilsson (1849–1939) was a Swedish textile artist who specialized in weaving. In 1880, together with her brother-in-law, she opened a weaving school in Lund which developed into a textile retail business with several branches, including one in Stockholm. Her work attracted significant attention at the Copenhagen's Nordic Exhibition in 1888. At the Paris World Fair in 1900, she was a awarded a gold medal.

== Biography ==
Born on 20 October 1849 on a farm just outside Lund, Thora Kulle was the daughter of Nils Nilsson, a farmer and factory owner, and his wife Hanna née Åkesdotter. She was one of nine children. She was educated in Lund in a school run by a Miss Darin where in addition to the usual subjects, she was also taught handicrafts. In 1973, she married Lars Leander Kulle with whom she had eight children, five surviving infancy. They settled on Lund's Bredgatan.

Along with Cilluf Olsson and Bengta Eskilsson, Kulle studied weaving at the Friends of Handicraft (Handarbetets Vänner) school in Lund. In 1879, together with her brother-in-law, the artist Jakob Kulle, who had helped to found the Friends of Handicraft, she established a weaving school. Together they developed a retail textile business with a store in Lund, selling goods produced by those trained in the school. They opened branches in various locations, including a store in Stockholm.

Kulle developed her skills in needlework and embroidery over the years, benefiting from her brother-in-law's interest in renewing the place of flower designs in Swedish fabrics. They drew on the textile designs which had survived in the homes of local peasants but were generally unknown. She managed to collect about a thousand different textile patterns which were used as a basis for their retail business.

Thora Kulle became widely known as a result of her submissions to international exhibitions. In addition to shows in Sweden, she participated in the Copenhagen's Nordic Exhibition in 1888 and the 1900 Paris World Fair where she won a gold medal.

Thora Kulle died on 12 October 1939 in Lund and is buried in the city's Norra Kyrkogården.
