= Hedvig Ulfsparre =

Swedish textile collector

Hedvig Hedvig Siriane Emilia Ulfsparre (10 April 1877 – 1 July 1963) was a Swedish textile collector in Hofors, Gävleborg County, who brought together thousands of artefacts consisting of lace, embroidery, tapestries, and rugs, creating Sweden's largest collection. Many of the works were created by the country's top textile artists including Märta Måås-Fjetterström, Margareta Grandin, Thyra Grafström, Maja Sjöström, Annie Frykholm, Ellen Ståhlbrand, and Hilda Starck Liljenberg. Her companion, the wealthy Per Eriksson who was particularly interested in textiles, gave her free rein to buy the best she could find and so, she did.

== Life ==
Hedvig Hedvig Siriane Emilia Ulfsparre was born in 1877, and grew up in Helsingborg, Her father was an officer, and she enjoyed a comfortable childhood in a Christian home. Her father had an interest in antiques, and Ulfsparre became interested in interior design and handicrafts. She trained as a nurse at the Red Cross nursing school in Stockholm, but became seriously ill will a lung infection in early 1904. She stayed at the home of Per Eriksson, the managing director of Hofors manor at Hofors works, who had made his house available to recuperating Red Cross nurses. Eriksson and Ulfsparre became friends, and then companions, and she became the hostess of Hofors manor.

Ulfsparre became a textile collector, and brought together thousands of artefacts consisting of lace, embroidery, tapestries, and rugs, creating Sweden's largest collection. Eriksson who was particularly interested in textiles, gave her free rein to buy the best she could find and so, she did. Many of the works were created by the country's top textile artists including Märta Måås-Fjetterström, Margareta Grandin, Thyra Grafström, Maja Sjöström, Annie Frykholm, Ellen Ståhlbrand, and Hilda Starck Liljenberg. Ulfsparre was involved in the collection of handicrafts items for the Baltic exhibition held in Malmö in 1914.
