= Jens Christian Djurhuus =

Faroese poet (1773–1853)

Jens Christian Djurhuus or Sjóvarbóndin (21 August 1773 – 21 November 1853) was the first poet who wrote in Faroese. He composed several Faroese ballads in traditional style on historical themes. The best known is Ormurin langi. Djurhuus also composed satirical poems directed against Danish rule in the Faroe Islands.

== Biography ==
Djurhuus was the fourth son of Johan Christian Djurhuus (1741–1815) and Maria Rønning (1741–1807). They lived in Nes, Eysturoy, where his Danish grandfather Christen Djurhuus (1708–1775) was provost. His mother came from Aust-Agder in Norway. She was reportedly a descendant of Earl Haakon Sigurdsson.

In 1797, he married Jóhanna Maria Jensdóttir from Kollafjørður, daughter of farmer Jens Didriksen (1710-1771) of Við Sjógv on Streymoy. Because Jóhanna Maria was his only child, she was sole heiress of the farm. The couple moved to this farm the same year, and it became the cultural centre of the village. Two of his great-grandsons, Janus Djurhuus (1881-1948) and Hans Andrias Djurhuus (1883-1953) were among the best known poets of the Faroe Islands. They were also commonly known as the Áarstova brothers (Áarstovubrøðurnir) after Áarstova, the house in Tórshavn where they grew up.

== Other sources ==
- Rossel, Sven H. (1992). A History of Danish Literature. University of Nebraska Press. ISBN 0-8032-3886-X
- Hanus Kamban: J.H.O. Djurhuus: En litterær biografi. Odense Universitetsforlag, 2001 - ISBN 87-7838-604-7
