= Bengta Eskilsson =

Swedish artist (1836–1923)

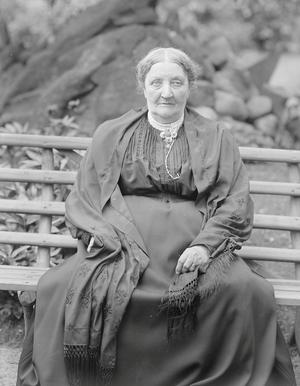
Bengta Eskilsson (1916)

Bengta Eskilsson née Nilsdotter (1836–1923) was a pioneering Swedish textile artist who helped to safeguard Scanian weaving traditions. In 1887, she established a successful weaving school and textile business in Lund which she ran for many years together with her daughters and nieces. The pieces and patterns produced by the school were appreciated at home and abroad. She won silver medals at several Swedish exhibitions and a gold medal at the 1900 Paris World Fair. Several of her works were bought by royalty.

== Biography ==
Born on 16 June 1836 in the village of Hammarlunda in Scania, Bengta Nilsdotter was the daughter of the farmer Nils Persson and his wife Elna née Larsdotter. Together with her younger sister Hanna, she was brought up on the Frostagård farm where her mother and grandmother taught her to weave. In 1857, she married John Fredrik Eskilsson, a maltman, with whom she had two daughters. The family lived in Eskilsgård, a fine half-timbered farmhouse on Lund's Gasverksgatan. It was there she established her weaving school where she worked for the next 50 years, assisted by her daughters and relatives.

Students from throughout Sweden came to learn weaving at her school. Like Thora Kulle and Cilluf Olsson, she received orders from the Friends of Handicraft association (Handarbetets Vänner) producing decorative Scanian textiles based on traditional local designs. The high quality of her works led to awards at home and abroad. In particular, she won a gold medal at the 1900 Paris World Fair.

Among those who purchased her fabrics were several European royal families, including Prince Eugen of Sweden and Archduke Franz Ferdinand of Austria. For Franz Ferdinand's hunting lodge, she produced a 12-meter long "drättaduk" decorated with a castle, horsemen, boats, peacocks and a double-headed eagle which bore a close resemblance to the Habsburg eagle. In 1896, Crown Princess Victoria purchased a tapestry depicting poppies, a pile rug from a pattern by Cilluf Olsson and a "dukagång" woven curtain by Thora Kulle.

Benta Eskilsson died in Lund on 2 January 1923 and is buried at St Peter's Priory. Her daughter donated many of her works to Lund's Kulturen and to the Malmö Museum.
