= Allan Scharff =

Danish silversmith and designer

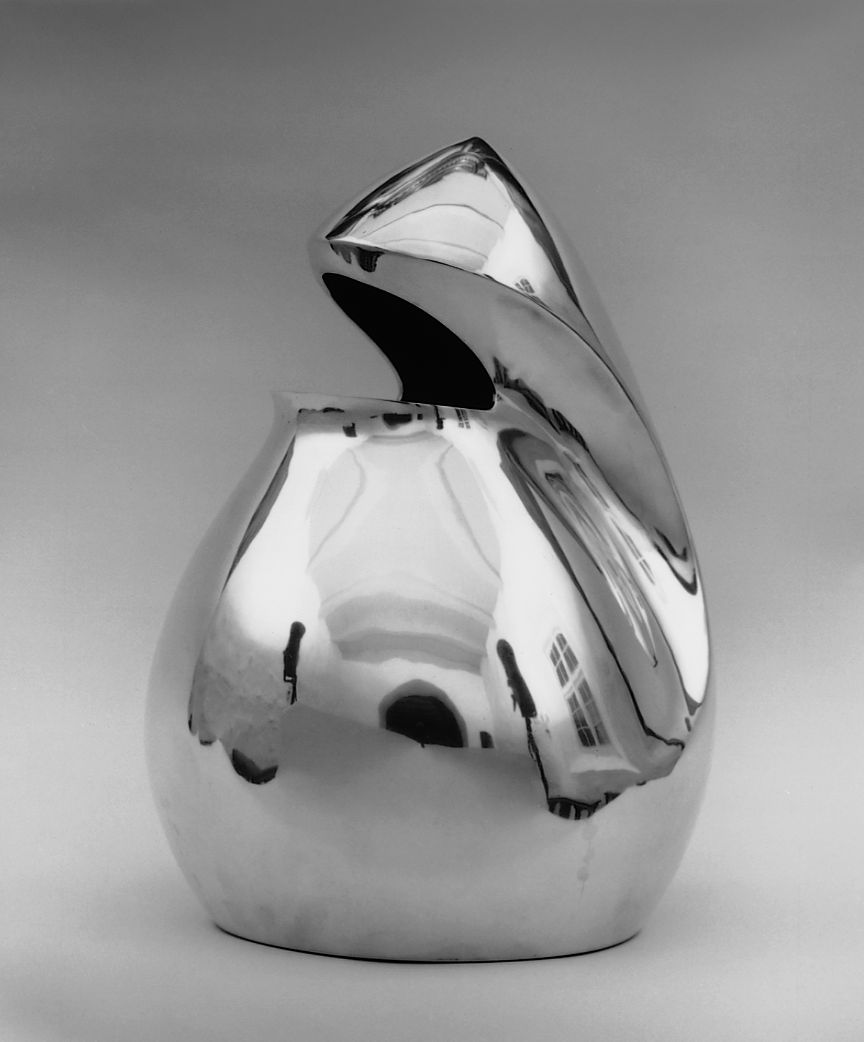
Pitcher by Scharff for Endelave Church, 1976

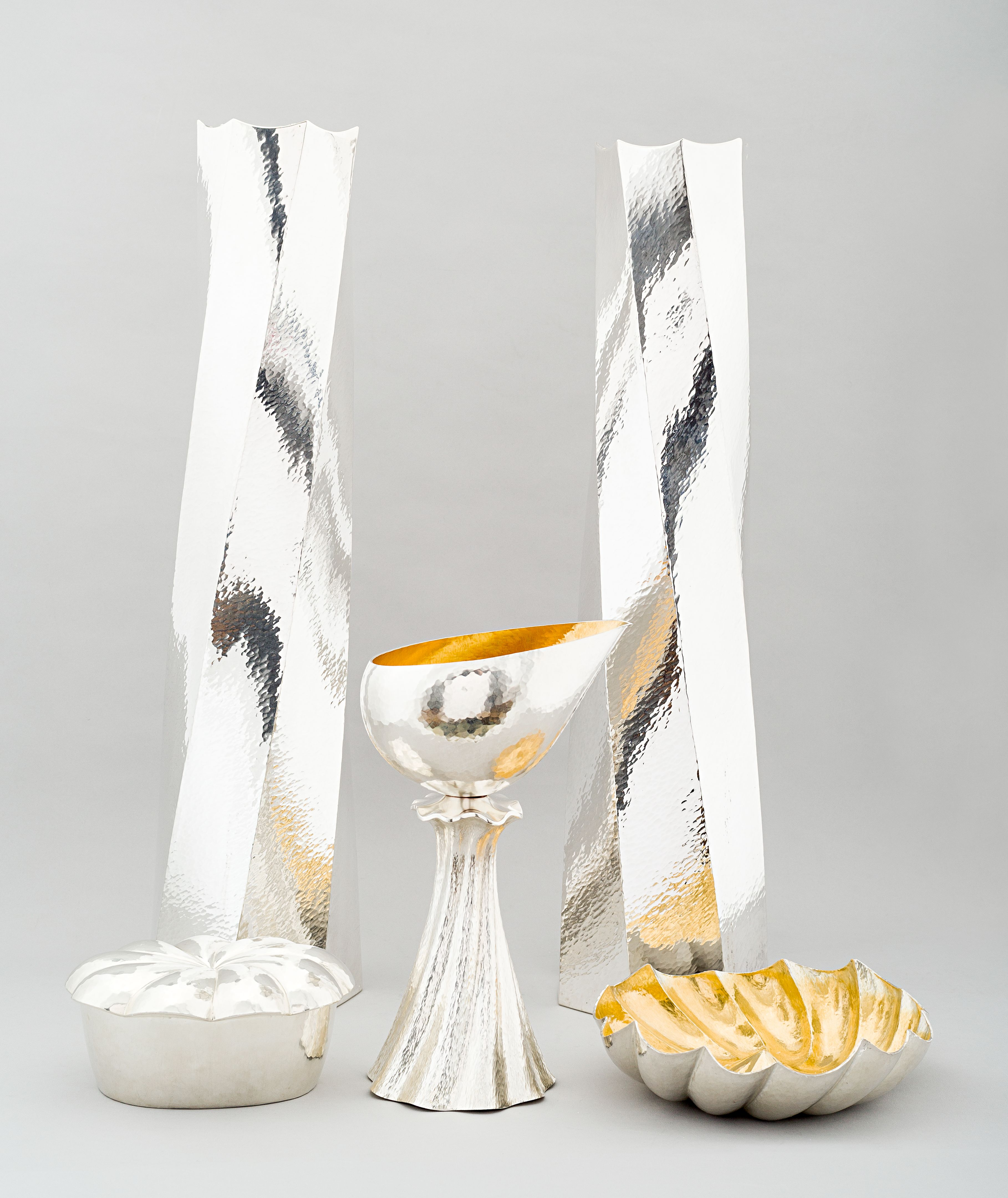
Candlesticks by Shcarff for the altar in Vissenbjerg Church, 2011

Allan Scharff (born 1945) is a Danish silversmith and designer. He worked for Georg Jensen for 16 years before establishing his own workshop on Sølvgade in Copenhagen. He has created silver objects for a number of Danish churches. He has also designed ceramic and glass pieces for companies such as Royal Copenhagen, Holmegaard and Orrefors.

== Biography ==
Scharff was born in 1945. He apprenticed as a silversmith with Georg Jensen from 1963 to 1967. His graduation piece was a complicated pitcher designed by Henning Koppel. After completing his apprenticeship, he continued his training at the Danish Goldsmith High School in Hellerup, graduating in 1975. He then worked for a couple of years as an independent designer. In 1978–79, he was the silversmith in residence at the Herning Art Museum (now Heart Museum of Modern Art) in Herning. He collaborated with the Hans Hansen Silversmithy from 1978 to 1987. In 1987, he returned to Georg Jensen. He has later established his own workshop at Sølvgade 20–22 in Copenhagen.

In December 1989, Scharff married the textile artist Naja Salto. They divorced in 1995.

== Work ==
Scharff's work for Georg Jensen include hollowware, jewelry and watches. He has also designed glass and ceramics objects for a number of leading Nordic design brands, including Georg Jens, Holmegaard. Royal Copenhagen) and Orrefors.

== Awards ==
In 1993, Scharff received the World Crafts Council Europe Award. In 1995, he won the Bayerrischer Staatpreis,
