= Bohus Stickning =

Swedish knitting cooperative (1939–1969)

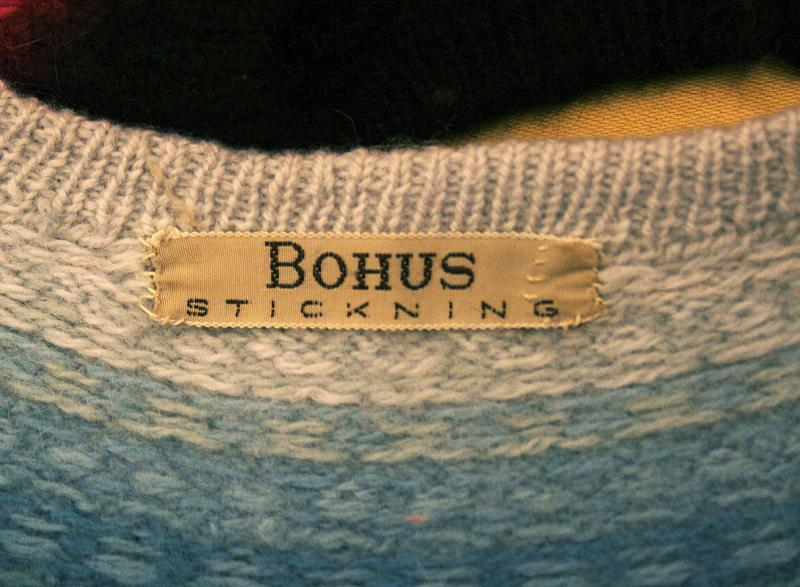
Bohus Stickning Label, Akvamarin design, ca. 1963. Susanna Hansson Collection.

Bohus Stickning was a Swedish knitting cooperative that was active between 1939 and 1969. It was established as a cottage industry to provide income for poor families in Bohuslän (Sweden) during World War II. Knitwear designed by the founder Emma Jacobsson and other designers was handknit by women in Bohuslän Province and sold to department stores, boutiques and fashion houses both in Sweden and internationally.

== Background and establishment ==
Emma Jacobsson, wife of the governor of Bohuslän, was approached in 1937 by a group of women who wanted to help launch a cooperative to increase economic opportunities for low-income families during a time of high unemployment. They experimented with the manufacture and sale of various products; the goal was to find a craft that did not require special equipment and that most women in the province could perform without special training. They decided upon the manufacture of handknit garments. Bohus Stickning was officially founded 12 September 1939 by Emma Jacobsson, who was its leader and guiding force throughout its thirty-year history.

During its earliest months, the cooperative produced mittens and socks. Emma Jacobsson was able to sell a number of these to large stores in Stockholm, such as Nordiska Kompaniet. From 1940 onward, Bohus Stickning produced scarves, hats, sweaters, and jackets, specializing in women's wear.

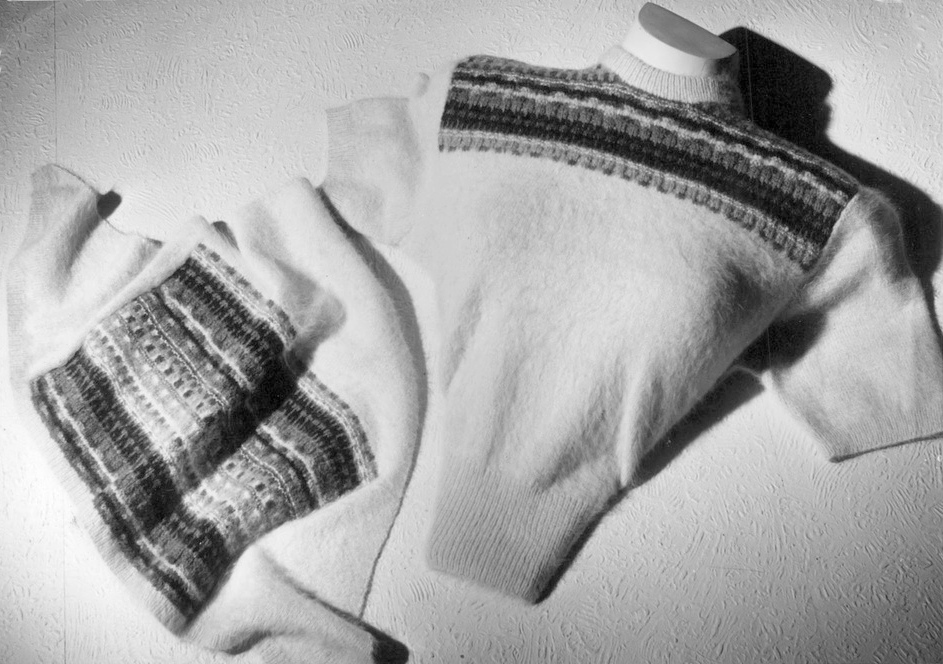
Bohus Stickning garments designed by Anna-Lisa Mannheimer-Lunn exhibited in the Nordiska Kompaniet department store. 28 September 1946.

== Design ==
Since there was no local knitting tradition in Bohuslän, Bohus Stickning recruited artists to produce new designs for the cooperative. During the 1940s, a characteristic "Bohus Stickning" style emerged: multicolored patterns making use of lightweight, wool or angora blend yarn, formed from distinctive combinations of knit and purl stitches.

Aside from Emma Jacobsson (a trained art historian and artist herself), Bohus Stickning designers included Vera Bjurström (1939-early 1940s), Anna-Lisa Mannheimer Lunn (1940s-1953), Annika Malmström-Bladini (1952-1959, then as a freelance designer until the mid-1960s), Kerstin Olson (1958-1969), and Karin Ivarsson (1960-1969). Mona Reuterberg, Margareta Nordlund, Ulla Eson Bodin, and Erna Gislev also took an active part in the artistic work of the cooperative. Göta Trägårdh also acted as a fashion advisor to help boost the cooperative's artistic profile. The Bohus Stickning brand became synonymous with high style and Swedish fashion. Notable clients included Helena Rubinstein, Juliette Gréco, Ingrid Bergman, Eartha Kitt, Grace Kelly, and Barbro Alving.

== The Revival ==
In 1995, Wendy Keele published Poems of Color: Knitting in the Bohus Tradition and the Women Who Drove This Swedish Cottage Industry. Her book kindled a revival of interest in Bohus Stickning, particularly outside of Sweden, offering the first extended history of the cooperative in English, including color reproductions of original design cards, and republishing photographs of vintage Bohus Stickning garments. In 1999, working with the Bohusläns Museum, master dyer Solveig Gustafsson sourced and dyed yarns to recreate Bohus Stickning garments from original pattern cards and instructions. She later recreated 70 Bohus Stickning patterns and offered the patterns and dyed yarns for sale through her business, Solsilke, and via the Bohusläns Museum, before retiring in 2014. Angora rabbit farmer Pernille Silfverberg then took over the enterprise and expanded the pattern repertoire through her business, Angoragarnet. The story of their research and efforts is chronicled in the museum's book, authored by Viveka Overland, Bohus Stickning: På Nytt, The Revival (2015). Gustafsson and the Bohusläns Museum are joint owners of the Bohus Stickning trademark. Bohus Stickning recreations are popular among knitters interested in fine gauge, multi-color, stranded knitting. Notably, Stephanie Pearl McPhee has blogged about her knitting progress during work on two Bohus Stickning reproduction sweaters, and Kate Davies has analyzed the Bohus Stickning yoke style through knitting the Gotiska Fönstret, or Gothic Window sweater. In 2009, Susanna Hansson and Wendy J. Johnson curated the exhibition, "Bohus Stickning. Radiant Knits: An Enchanting Obsession," at the American Swedish Institute in Minneapolis, Minnesota, which highlighted both the history and legacy of the Bohus Stickning cooperative.

== Notable designs ==
- Stora Nejlikan, The Large Carnation, by Emma Jacobsson, (early 1940s)
- Blåklint, Cornflower, by Vera Bjürström, 1940.
- Röda Randen, The Red Edge, by Anna-Lisa Mannheimer-Lunn, ca. 1940
- Härskogen, by Anna-Lisa Mannheimer-Lunn, (mid-1940s)
- Blå Skimmer, Blue Shimmer, by Anna-Lisa Mannheimer, Lunn, 1949
- Skogsmörkret, The Forest Darkness, by Annika Malmström-Bladini, 1953
- Vildäpplet, The Wild Apple, by Kerstin Olsson, 1958
- Gröna Dimman, The Green Mist, by Kerstin Olsson, 1963
- Ägget, The Egg, by Kerstin Olsson, 1963
- Stora Svanen, The Large Swan, by Karin Ivarsson, 1966
