= Elisabeth Forsell =

Swedish artist

Elisabeth Forsell (fl. 1747) was a Swedish weaver regarded as a pioneer within the linen industry in Finland, where she was active from 1739 to 1747. She introduced the spinning jenny and the linen weaver profession in Finland and had an unusual position for her gender at the time, being a woman sent on government support and power of attorney to in effect introduce a new profession.

In response to a growing need of yarn, the Stockholm authorities founded spinning schools in 1739. Finland, at the time a Swedish Province, was deemed especially suitable for the cultivation of linen, and a decision was made to appoint a spinning teacher on state expense to introduce the profession in Finland. Elisabeth Forsell, at that time a weaver at the Kättsta factory in Haraker in Västmanland, was appointed to this position because she was deemed to be the perhaps best weaver in Sweden at that time. She was given a power of attorney to demand any assistance necessary from the Finnish authorities and a spinning jenny: this was not the English version, but a different model, constructed by Abraham Hedman of Kättsta.

In Finland, she gave lessons in Åbo (Turku) 1739–1740, and in Borgå (Porvoo) in 1740–1747. Her students were likely exclusively women, as the profession of weaver was at that time customarily regarded as a woman's profession, and the majority of her students are described as maidservants, wives and daughters of craftsmen, though, reportedly, some women from the upper classes were also interested to learn the technique. She was met by some resistance from the local authorities and governor, often motivated by the controversy of a young woman using a power of attorney to demand assistance from the authorities.

She is last mentioned in 1747; after this year, her life is unknown, but she is believed to have returned to Sweden proper and left her weaving school to her student Juliana Garberg.

== See also ==
- Margaretha Zetterberg
