= Maria Rønning =

Norwegian-Faroese artist (1741–1807)

Maria Rønning (1741–1807), was a Norwegian-Faroese weaver. She was born to Norwegian farmers Hans Gunnarsson Rønning and Anne Håvardsdatter, in 1768 married Johan Christian Djurhuus, and was the mother of the writer Jens Christian Djurhuus. She lived in the Faroe Islands after her marriage in 1768, where she introduced a new type of loom.
