= Gertie Wandel =

Danish textile artist

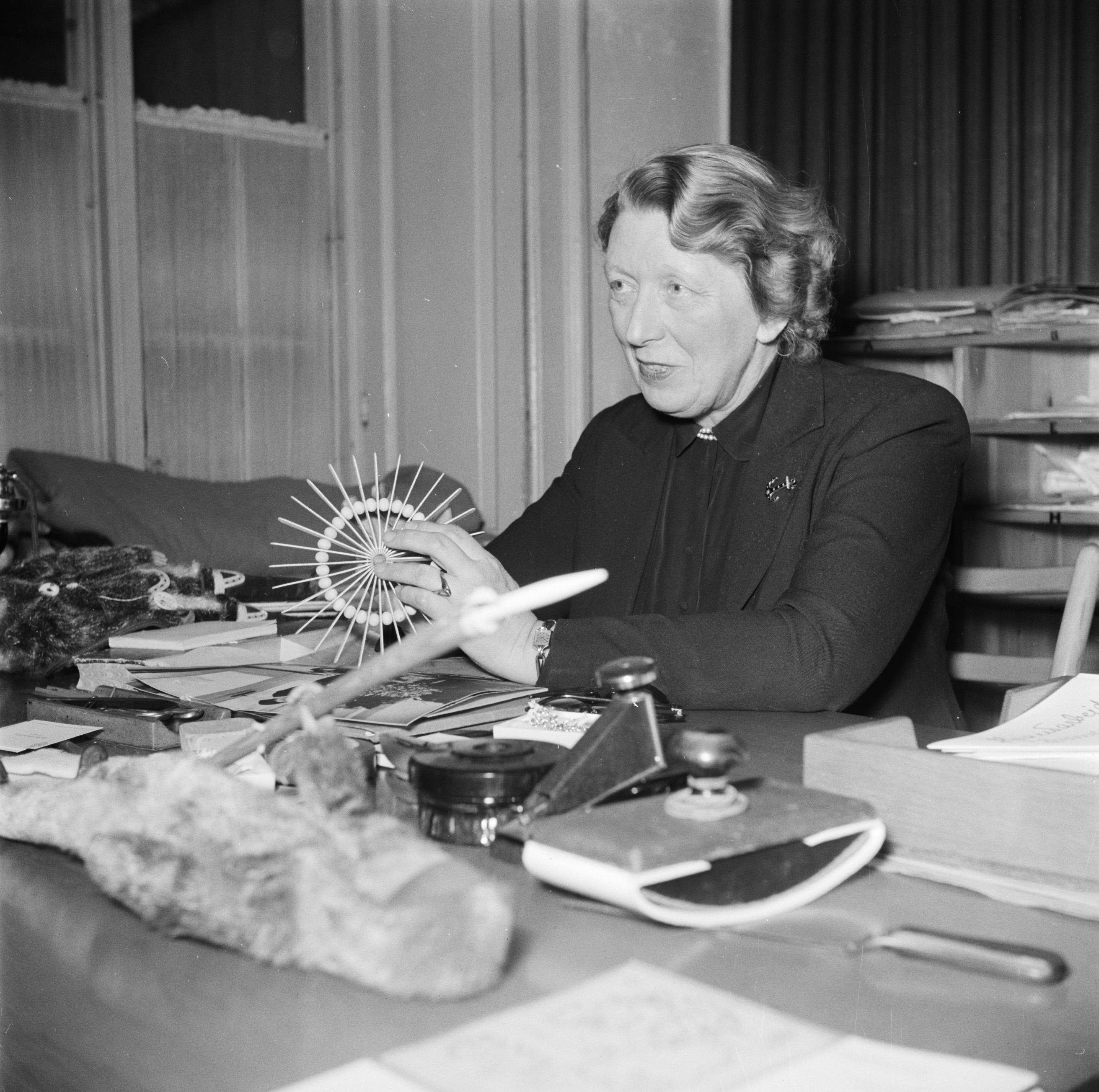
Gertie Wandel in March 1954

Gertie Wandel née Møller (1894–1988) was a Danish textile artist and politician who is remembered for the role she played in establishing Håndarbejdets Fremme (the Danish Handcraft Guild) in 1928 and consolidating its activities in support of embroidery until 1978. She was also active in local politics in Gentofte.

== Early life and education ==
Born in Copenhagen on 7 November 1894, Gertie Møller was the daughter of the merchant Emilius Møller (1853–1927) and Magdalene Sophie Jessen (1860–1914). After graduating from N. Zahle's School in 1914, she studied French and history of art at the University of Copenhagen. She then turned her attention to textiles, learning the intricacies of embroidery, sewing, and design work, as well as the history of textile art.

In 1919, she married the merchant Helge Carl Wandel (1891–1952). They moved into a large house in Gentofte where they raised their three children: Carl Adam (1919), Einar (1924) and Niels Erik (1931).

== Career ==
In 1928, Wandel participated in the establishment of Håndarbejdets Fremme where she served on the board from 1931. She was later promoted to deputy chair, and then to chair, a position she held from 1943 to 1978. The organization played a major role in promoting Danish embroidery in Scandinavia and beyond.

Wandel was a highly effective leader, handling the organization's day-to-day management from the beginning. She took care of developing a workshop, a magazine, pattern books, a school, a large exhibition area, and retail outlets in Copenhagen and other large cities in Denmark and abroad. Quick to see development opportunities as they arose, she managed to encourage others to support her in her initiatives and attracted many top textile artists to participate in the organization. She ran Håndarbejdets Fremme until 1978, but continued to serve on the board for the rest of her life.

She also actively supported textile arts in both the Faroe Islands and Greenland while promoting the use of Faroese wool in Denmark.

On the political front, Wandel served on the Gentofte municipal council from 1943 to 1970, representing the Conservative People's Party. She became deputy mayor of Gentofte for the last four years of her service. She also campaigned for the Folketing, serving as alternate with responsibilities for educational and social policy and the mentally disabled.

Gertie Wandel died in Gentofte on 29 July 1988. She is buried in Frederiksberg Ældre Kirkegård.

== Awards ==
Gertie Wandel was one of the first women to be honoured with the Order of the Dannebrog in 1951. She became a Knight 1st Class in 1965.
