= Naja Salto =

Danish textile artist (1945–2016)

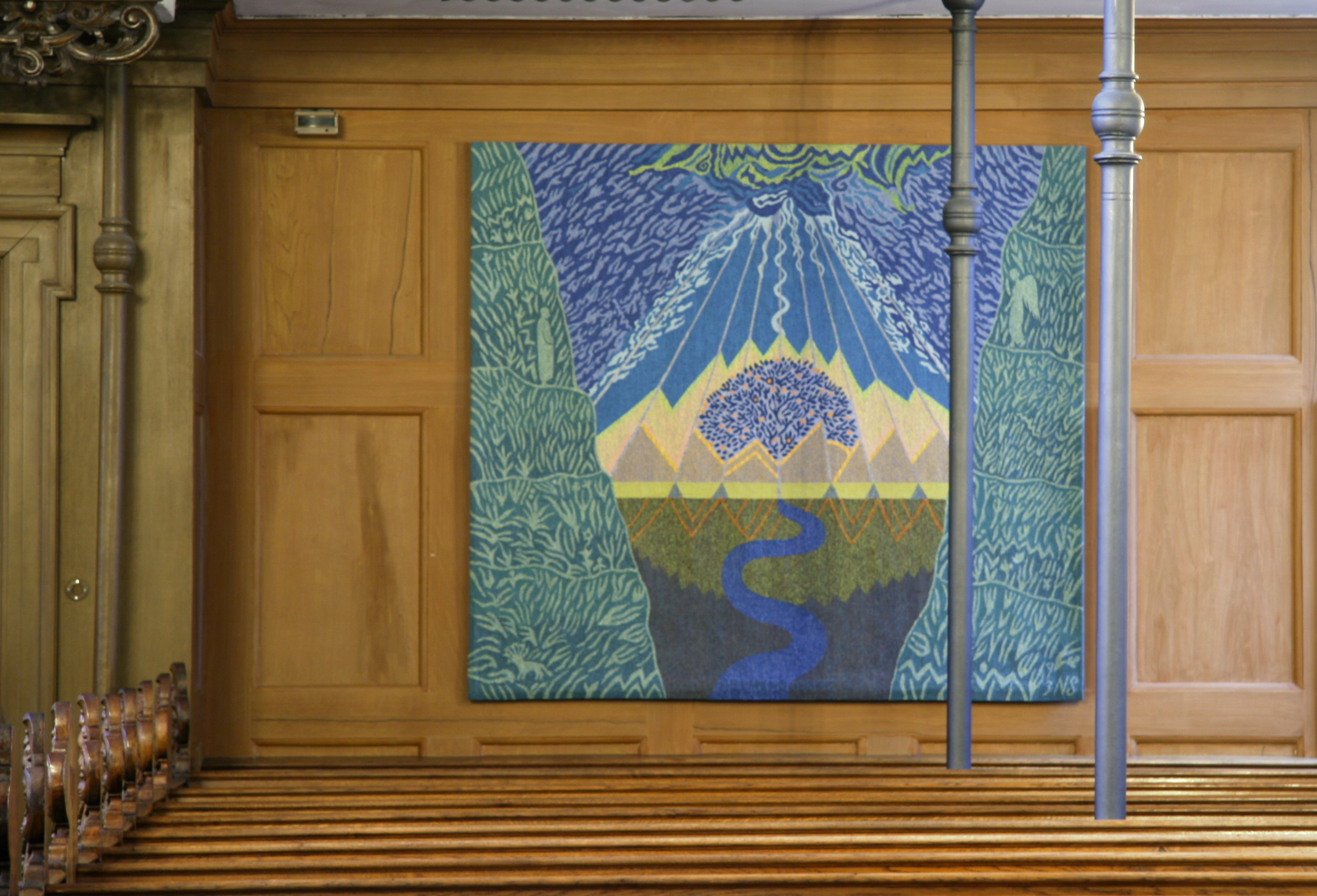

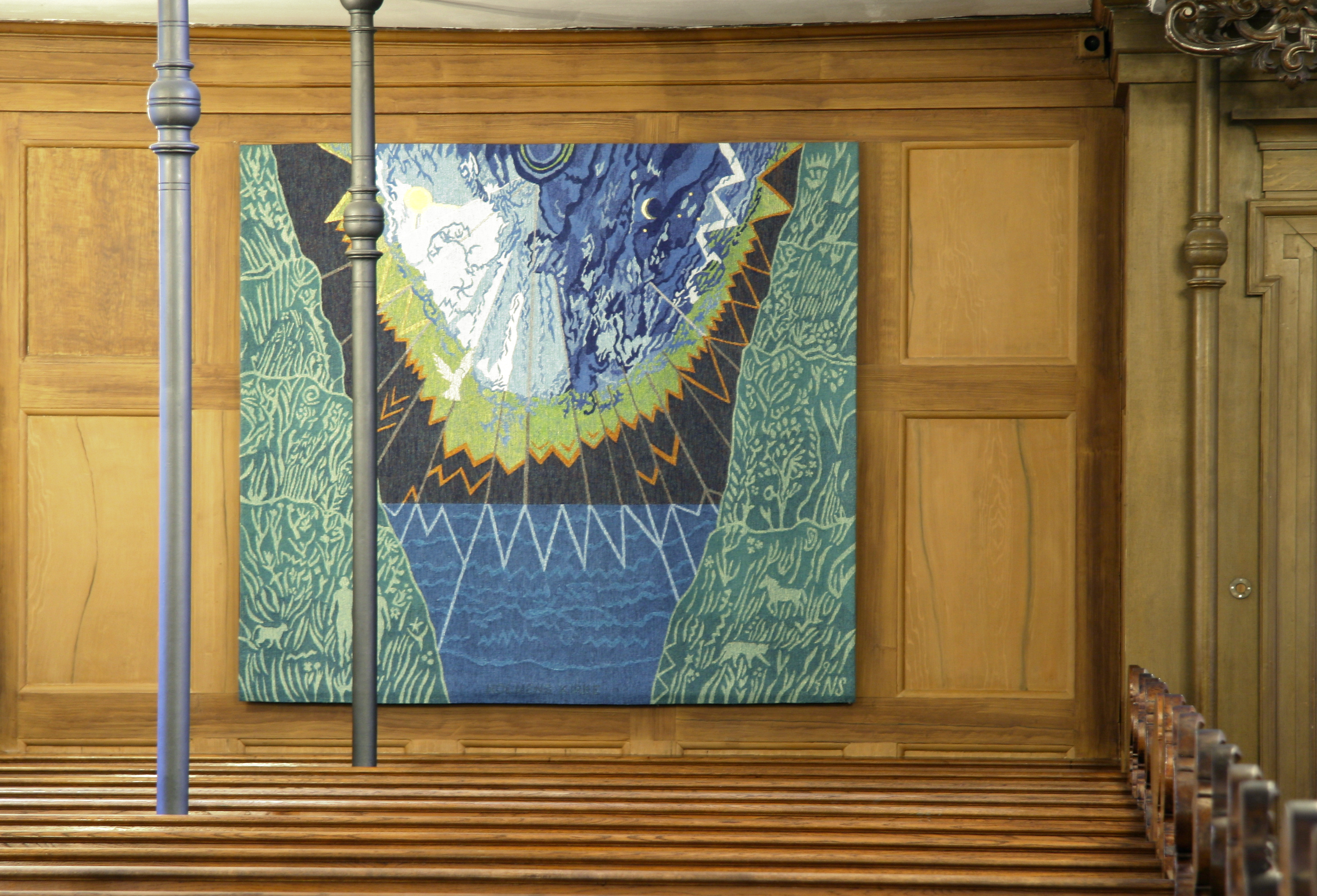
Naja Salto: Two tapestries in Holmen's Church

Naja Salto (22 November 1945 – 3 March 2016) was a Danish painter and textile artist who is remembered for her rich, brightly coloured tapestries, many depicting scenes of the sea and the sky.

== Early life, education and family ==
Born in Copenhagen on 22 November 1945, Naja Salto was the daughter of the painter and ceramist Axel Johannes Salto (1889–1961) and Gerda Åkesson (1909–92), also a painter and ceramist. She studied textile art at the Arts and Crafts School under Franka Rasmussen (1962–66). She later attended the Danish Theatre School where she studied scenography (1972–76).

With Sven Poulsson, whom she married in June 1967, she had a son, Kasper Salto, who became a furniture designer. The marriage was dissolved in 1969. In December 1989, she married the designer and silversmith Allan Scharff but was divorced in 1995. In June 1995, she married the auctioneer Jens Christian Thygesen.

== Career ==
Salto began to weave while young, adopting both traditional and experimental techniques after opening her own workshop in 1966. She used increasingly vivid colours, depicting motifs from Nordic mythology as well as the sea. Her interest in scenography was reflected in her modern tapestries, some representing pictorial images, others adapted to church decoration. By the 1990s, she had initiated new approaches to textile art in Denmark. She also created works in stained glass. In later years, she moved from tapestry to painting.

Salto was one of the artists who contributed to Haandarbejdets Fremme (Danish Handcraft Guild) which became the main focus for textile art in Denmark.

Examples of her work can be seen in Holmen's Church, Copenhagen, and the Carl Nielsen Museum in Odense. She created the stage curtain depicting the "Tree of Life" in the National Museum of Denmark. In 2006, her work was exhibited in Kunsten, Aalborg together with that of her father Axel and her son Kasper.

Naja Salto died on 3 March 2016.
