= Dagmar Starcke =

Danish textile artist

Dagmar Margrethe Kristine Starcke née Kaae (1899–1975) was a Danish painter and textile artist who is remembered for her pictorial collages and woven textile works. Several of her creations are in the permanent collection at the Worker's Museum in Copenhagen. Starcke was one of the artists who contributed to the sewing and embroidery organization Haandarbejdets Fremme.

== Biography ==
Born on 13 December 1899 in the Frederiksberg district of Copenhagen, Dagmar Margrethe Kristine Kaae was the daughter of Frederik Christian Larsen Kaae and Hansine Klinge. After matriculating from high school, she attended the Tegne- og Kunstindustriskole for Kvinder (Drawing and Handicrafts School for Women) before studying at the Royal Danish Academy of Fine Arts under Sigurd Wandel (1921–24). In 1925 in Paris, she married the sculptor Henrik Starcke (1899–1973).

Although she graduated from the Danish Academy as a painter, Starcke was above all proficient as a textile artist, creating pictorial collages and woven pieces, both large and small. She used fabrics or "rags" of various kinds to provide shape and colour to her work, creating simple but refined artistic compositions. Her subjects were frequently inspired by the tales of Hans Christian Andersen or by stories from the Bible. Many of her works were used to decorate public institutions or social housing. Starcke also worked with other materials and techniques, for example by creating mosaics of sintered brick.

Dagmar Starcke died in Farum around 27 July 1975.

== Awards ==
Starcke received several grants and awards including the Tagea Brandt Rejselegat (1943) and the Niels Larsen Stevns prize (1973).
