= Elna M. de Neergaard =

Danish-American weaver and occupational therapist

Elna M. de Neergaard (September 7, 1872 – June 26, 1946) was a Danish-American textile artist and inventor. De Neergaard, who studied weaving in Sweden, designed and patented handlooms in the United States. De Neergaard was associated with the Arts and Crafts movement in New York and Boston; she lived in New York and Connecticut where she also taught weaving. Most notable of her patented looms are the Tawido (tawidō, or proto-norse: ᛏᚨᚹᛁᛞᛟ) table, bedside, and belt looms. For a time, de Neergaard's Tawido looms were constructed in Sweden at the Önnestads Folk High School (Önnestads Folkhögskola).

Elna was an active member of The National Society of Craftsmen, the Society of Arts and Crafts Boston, and the Needle & Bobbin Club.

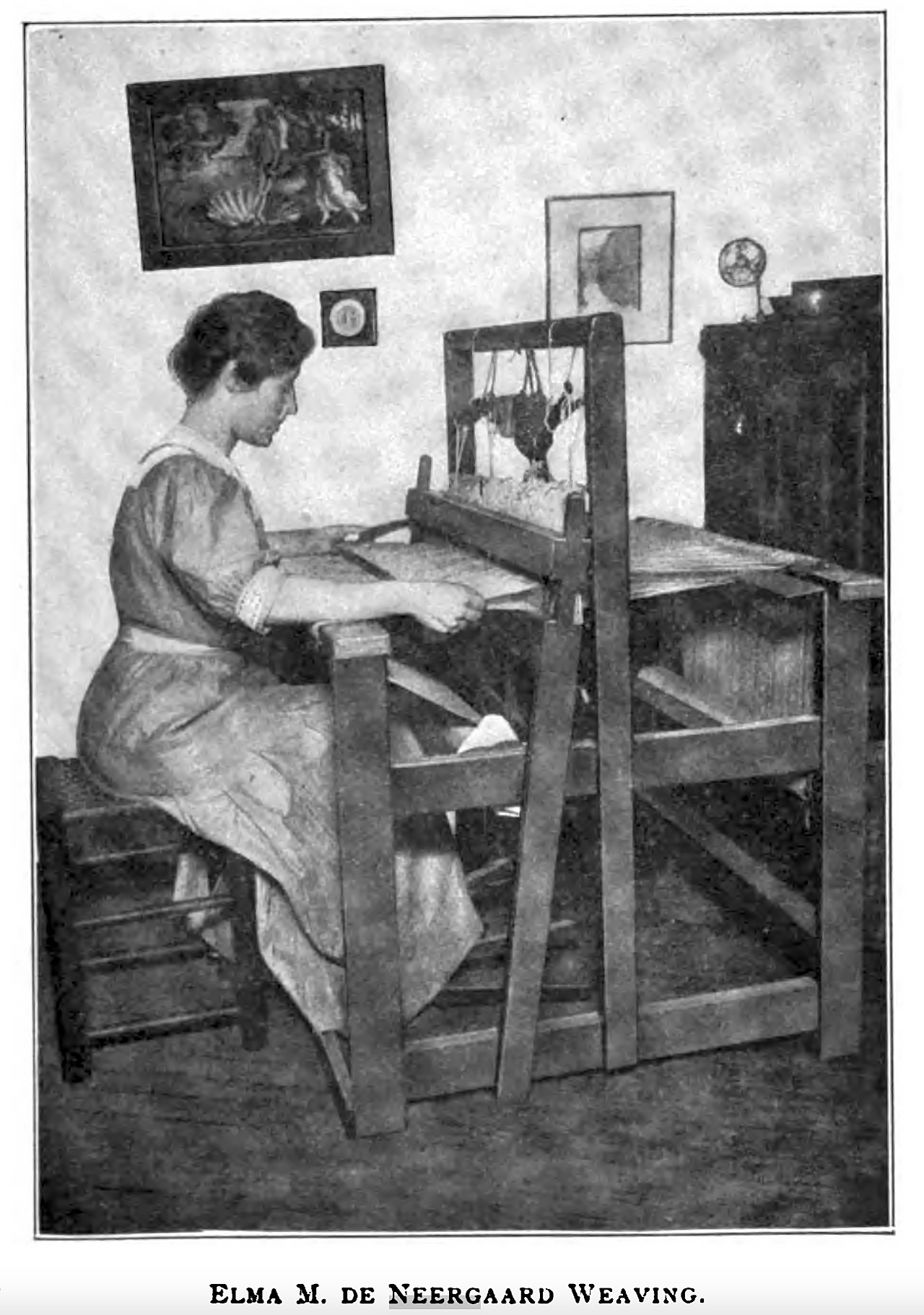
Elna M. de Neergaard weaving (from Priestman, Mabel Tuke (1908). "Swedish Weaving". Home Needlework Magazine. 10 (3): 209–210 – via Google Books.)

== Education and career ==
De Neergaard studied weaving at Handarbetets Vänner (Friends of Handicraft) in Stockholm. She completed her study there in 1897.

=== Teachers College, Columbia University ===
By 1917, de Neergaard was an instructor of weaving for newly created Occupational Therapy courses at Teachers College, Columbia University. In 1918, de Neergaard was a lecturer in "Household Arts" at Teacher's College.

==== Professional and political affiliations ====
Elna was also affiliated with the Institute of Crafts and Industry, Waterbury, Connecticut.

De Neergaard was an active supporter of the suffrage movement in New York City, participating with Harriot Stanton Blatch's Women's Political Union, in the May 6, 1911 New York City Suffrage parade.

== Bibliography ==
- Elna de Neergaard, the "Little Lady of the Looms."
- Priestman, Mabel Tuke (1908). "Swedish Weaving". Home Needlework Magazine. 10 (3): 209–210 – via Google Books.
- de Neergaard, Elna M. (October 1920). "A Modern Adaptation of an Umbrian Weave". Bulletin of the Needle and Bobbin Club. 4 (2): 27 – via HathiTrust.
- "Önnestadsvävstolen" [Önnestads Loom] (PDF). Önnestads Hembygdsförening: Årsskrift 2017 (in Swedish): 8. 2017.
