= Johan Christoffer Boklund =

Swedish painter

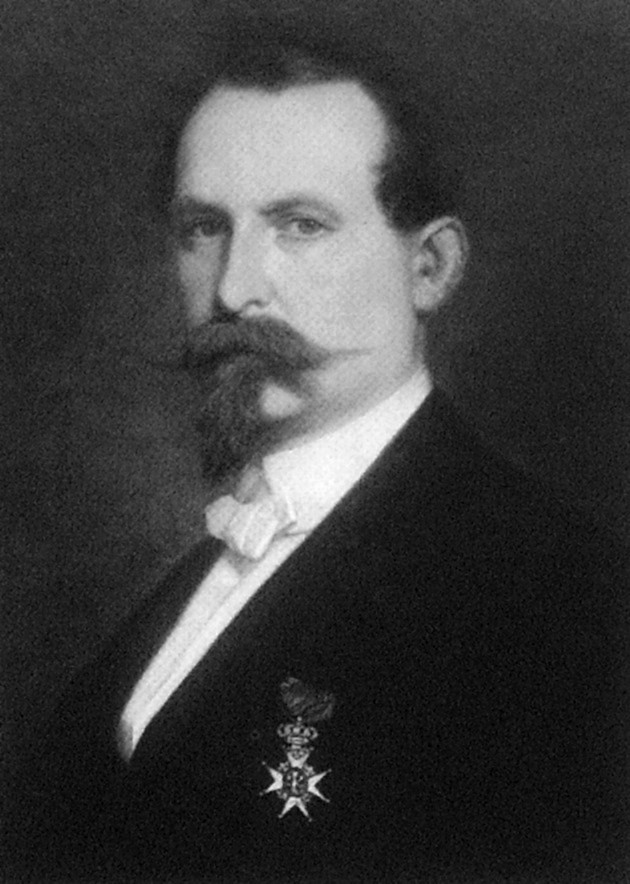
- Born: 15 July 1817; Kulla-Gunnarstorp, Scania
- Died: 9 December 1880 (aged 63); Stockholm
- Known for: History, genre, and portrait painting

Johan Christoffer Boklund (15 July 1817 – 9 December 1880) was a Swedish history, genre, and portrait painter from Kulla-Gunnarstorp in Scania. He was the son of a gardener. At the age of fifteen, Boklund came to Lund, where he worked on illustrations for Sven Nilsson's works on Scandinavian fauna (under the supervision of Magnus Körner). He then became a student at the Royal Danish Academy of Fine Arts in Copenhagen where J. L. Lund was his teacher.

== Biography ==
In 1837, Boklund went to Stockholm and began studying at the Royal Swedish Academy of Arts. He made a living as a lithograph and drawing teacher, and produced several small genre paintings of the everyday life (such as Flicka med blomster (English: Girl with flowers) and Köksinteriör (English: Kitchen interior)) and history paintings of the 17th century (such as Gustaf Adolfs afsked från Maria Eleonora (English: Gustaf Adolf's farewell from Maria Eleonora), which was awarded with a medal at the academy).

Together with fellow Swedish painter Johan Fredrik Höckert, Boklund traveled to Munich in Germany in 1846 and stayed there for eight years. During the summers he went on study trips to Bavaria, Tyrol, and northern Italy. During this period, Boklund primarily devoted his painting to the history genre with subjects from the 17th century, but he also made some paintings depicting picturesque and architectural interior. In 1853, he sent his painting Den nyfikne trumpetaren (English: The curious trumpet player) home to Sweden and it earned him a scholarship from the government. This allowed Boklund to move to Paris, where he worked at Thomas Couture's atelier from 1854 to 1855. In December 1855 he returned to Sweden.

Boklund became a teacher in painting at the Royal Swedish Academy of Arts in 1856, and was later appointed as professor. He taught, among others, King Charles XV of Sweden between 1856 and 1872. They were close friends. In 1866 he became curator at the Swedish National Museum of Fine Arts, and the following year he was appointed as director of the academy. Boklund was also a member of the committee that organized the 1866 Nordic Art Exhibition in Stockholm. Around the same time, he helped establish the women's section at the academy.

Boklund died on 9 December 1880 in Stockholm. Among the most famous paintings he made after his return to Sweden are Rådplägning: Gustaf II Adolf och tre krigare (1856), Till Karl X Gustaf framföres en ung krigare, som tillfångatagit en polack (1859), Gustaf II Adolf och Axel Oxenstierna i öfverläggning om tyska kriget (1859), Ordonnans från trettioåriga kriget (1855), Tekla mottager underrättelsen om Max Piccolominis död (1860), Porträtt af drottning Lovisa (1861), Kristus i örtagården (1861), Meranerskyttar efter en målskjutning (1861), Klostergård i Tyrolen (1863), En lärd (1863), Utkik från förskansningarna (1874), and Marodör förföljer sitt rof (1875).

Johanna Carola Stuttgardter, daughter of Isaak Stuttgarter and Barbara Marx from Furth, Bavaria Germany became Boklund's wife in 1858. They had eight children, several of whom followed artistic careers: their daughter Thyra Grafström (1864–1925) was a notable textile artist.

== Selected works ==
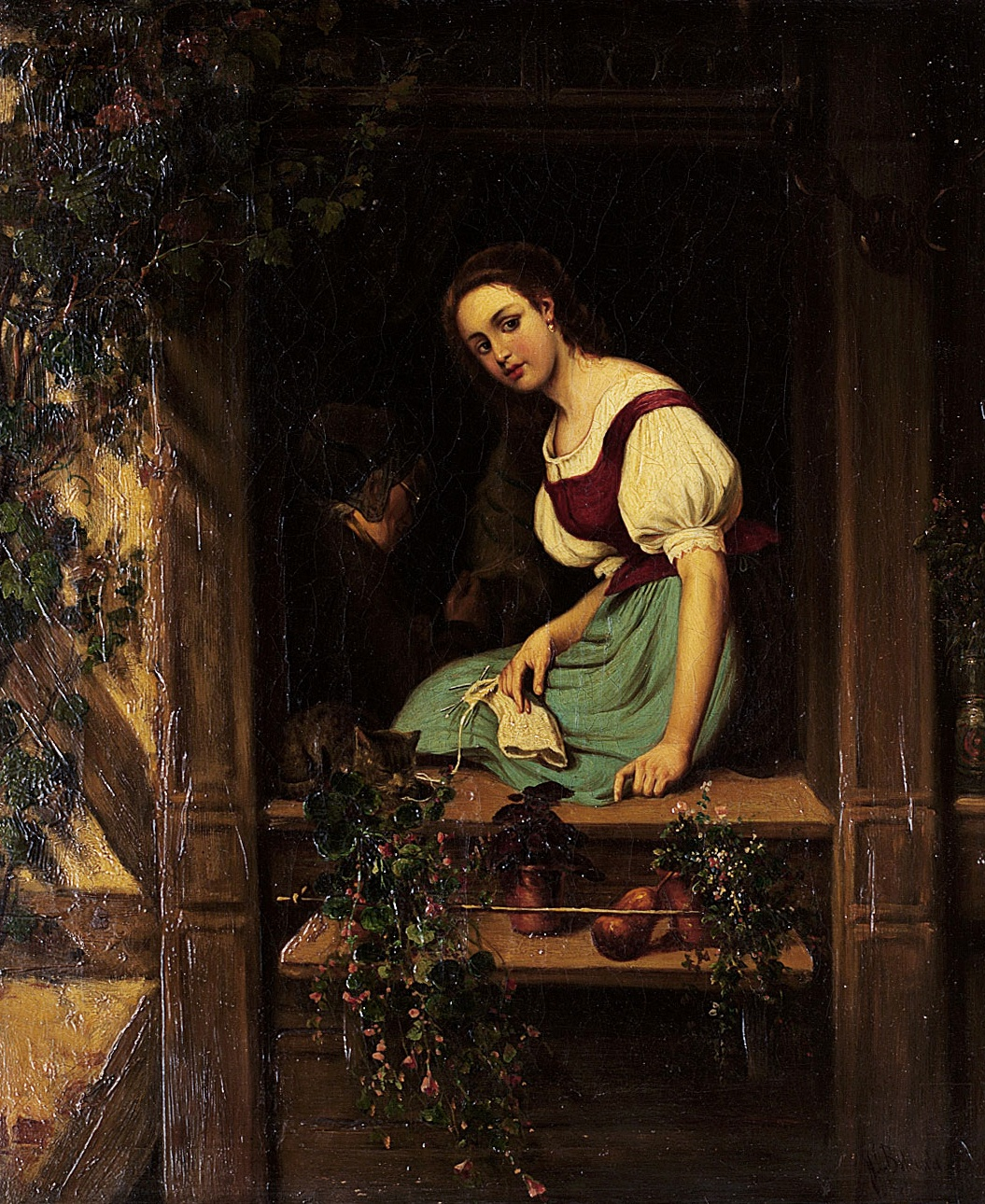
Genre painting depicting a young woman knitting in a window

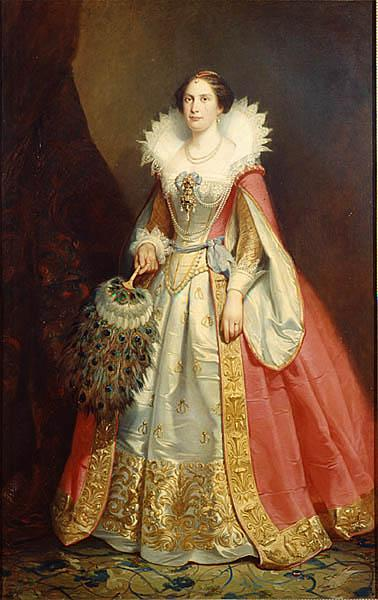
Porträtt af drottning Lovisa (1861), a portrait painting of Queen Lovisa

Meranerskyttar (1862), a history painting depicting marksman in Merano during the rebellion
