= Emma Jacobsson =

Austrian-born, Swedish botanist, art historian, knitwear designer, entrepreneur

Emma Charlotte Stiasny Jacobsson (1883 – 1977) was an Austrian-born Swedish botanist, art historian, knitwear designer, and entrepreneur. She was a founder of the Bohus Stickning knitting cooperative, and the executive director during its thirty years of operation.

== Early life ==
Jacobsson was born into a Jewish family in Vienna, Austria. Her parents, Franz Clemens Stiasny and Anna Stiasny, were members of an intellectual community in Vienna that included Sigmund Freud. She earned a doctorate in botany in 1913; her dissertation, Versuch einer histologisch-phylogenetischen Bearbeitung der Papilionaceae, concerned the phylogenetics of the flowering plant subfamily Faboideae or Papilionoideae. While studying in Berlin, she met Malte Jacobsson, whom she married in 1912. They settled in Gothenburg, Sweden. Although she did not continue with a career in botany, she published several academic papers on subjects relating to art history.

== Career ==
From 1912 until 1950, Emma Jacobsson was married to Malte Jacobsson, who became governor of the province of Bohüslan, Sweden in 1934. As wife of the governor of Bohüslan, Jacobsson used her position to provide community leadership and improve economic conditions in the province by establishing a cottage industry in 1939. It became known as Bohus Stickning, a cooperative that attained international stature and was in operation until 1969 with Jacobsson as its executive director. Bohus Stickning provided economic support for knitters in Bohüslan and became known in Sweden and abroad. Jacobsson was herself a designer for Bohus Stickning, particularly during the cooperative's early years. Many of her designs were inspired by objects on display in museums, such as Peruvian textiles, decorative arts from China, and antique Swedish woven textiles with heraldic motifs. As director of Bohus Stickning, Emma Jacobsson participated in the design process by editing the submissions of other designers, suggesting alterations, and having final decision-making authority. She exhibited in Sweden and internationally, including the Milan Triennale, in 1951, 1954, and 1960.

Emma Jacobsson’s vision for the company’s fashion brand and guidance led Bohus Stickning to achieve international name recognition. An entrepreneur, Jacobsson forged commercial connections for the Bohus Stickning cooperative with Nordiska Kompaniet in Stockholm and Gillblads in Gothenburg, and working through an export trade distributor, sold products to department stores in the United States such as Neiman Marcus. Notable clients included Ingrid Bergman and Grace Kelly. She led the company for thirty years until it closed in 1969. Jacobsson died in 1977.

== Notable Patterns Designed by Emma Jacobsson for Bohus Stickning ==
Swedish Name	English name	Year	Notes
Stora Nejlikan	The Large Carnation	early 1940s	Paneled woolen cardigan embellished with embroidery.
Ormen	The Snake	1947	Short or long sleeve pullover in dark burgundy or green with patterned yoke. Pattern design inspired by Peruvian textiles on exhibit at the Ethnographic Museum of the East India House in Gothenburg. Angora/wool mix.
Finska axet	Finnish Spike	early 1940s	Wool cardigan. See also: Socks with patterned cuff.
Rådjursspåret	The Deer Track	1948	Wool pullover.
Vävnaden; Modern recreation	The Woven One; Modern recreation	early 1940s	2-color wool cardigan. Inspired by the Swedish weaving technique, opphämta or smålandsweave.

== Bibliography ==
- "Emma Jacobsson Put Knitting Needles to Work: She Rescued a Province, Founded a Unique Industry" Eugene Register-Guard. 7 Sept 1966, p. 13.
- Åmossa, Karin. Du är NK!: konstruktioner av yrkesidentiteter på varuhuset NK ur ett genus- och klassperspektiv 1918-1975. Stockholm: Almqvist & Wiksell International, 2004.
- Häglund, Ulla, and Ingrid Mesterton. Bohus stickning 1939-1969. Göteborg: Föreningen Bohus Stickning, 1980.
- Häglund, Ulla. Bohus Stickning. Bohuslän Museum, 1999.
- Hald, Arthur, and Sven Erik Skawonius. Contemporary Swedish design; a survey in pictures. Stockholm: Nordisk Rotogravyr, 1951.
- Keele, Wendy. Poems of Color. Knitting in the Bohus Tradition. Interweave Press 1995.
- Overland, Viveka. Bohus Stickning: på nytt. The Revival. Bohusläns museums förlag 2015.
