= Gudrun Stig Aagaard =

Danish textile artist

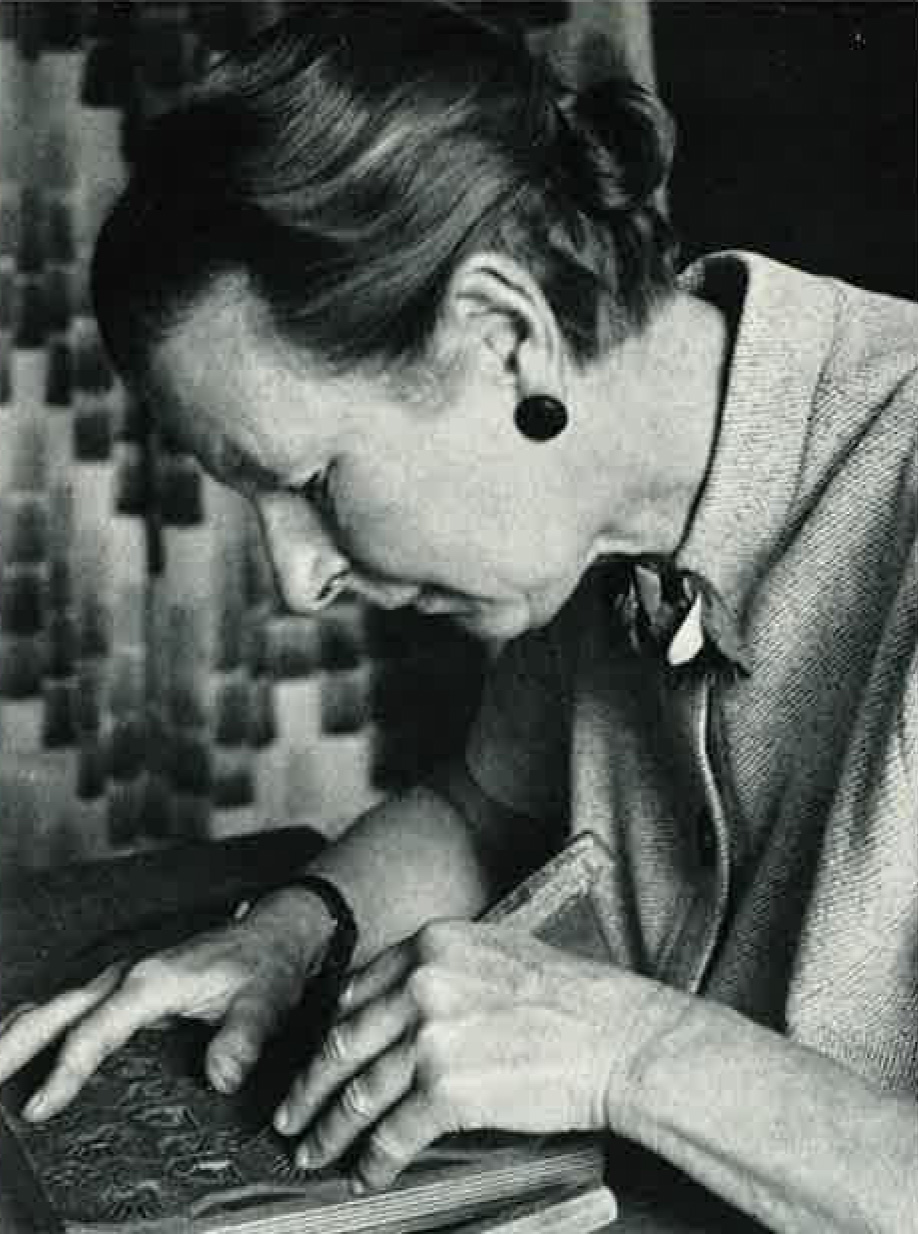
Gudrun Stig Aagaard, textile designer

Gudrun Stig Aagaard (13 January 1895 – 19 April 1986) was a Danish textile artist who specialized in printed fabrics. She opened her own workshop in 1928, pioneering printed textile designs in Denmark. She initially produced classical patterns but later adopted a more abstract approach in her creations for L.F. Foght. For over 50 years, she collaborated with Haandarbejdets Fremme.

== Early life and education ==
Born on 13 January 1895 in the village of Torslunde, Ishøj Municipality, Gudrun Stig Aagaard was the daughter of the factory manager Einar Nielsen (1855–1908) and Elisabeth Margrethe Thomsen (1857–1960). She was educated as a weaver in the early 1920s at the Tegne- og Kunstindustriskolen for Kvinder (Arts and Crafts School for Women) in Copenhagen and at the Académie des Beaux arts des Tissus in Lyon, France.

== Career ==
Aagaard first worked in Anton Rosen's textile workshop. After using the batik technique for a number of years, she sought a simpler approach to printing fabrics. She made a number of study trips to England, France and Germany, where she was introduced to textile printing and dye production at IG Farben in Frankfurt. In 1928, she opened her own workshop, producing printed, woven and embroidered goods.

She became particularly interested in the traditional Danish calico print technique known as kattuntryk. Inspired by the old presses she had found in museums, she developed patterns on linoleum blocks. Unlike her contemporaries who used time-consuming screen printing techniques, in the later 1940s she continued developing calico prints in her workshop, providing the means for her to develop her own expressive patterns. As a result of growing demand in the 1950s, some of her patterns were adapted for screen printing. Aagaard also created patterns for commercial production by the L.F. Foght textile firm. Her most popular patterns based on floral or abstract contoured designs included Levende Sten (1950), Lianer (1951) and Mohamed (1953). Her patterns were carefully produced, combining flowers, leaves, triangles, and zigzagging lines. They exhibit discrete, harmonious shades, frequently inspired by plants.

Aagaard's work was exhibited at home and abroad. Items were included in "The Arts of Denmark" exhibition at the Metropolitan Museum of Art (1960–61) and at the many shows arranged by Haandarbejdets Fremme where she was employed for over 50 years.

Gudrun Stig Aagaard died on 19 April 1986 in Copenhagen.
