= Rose-Marie Huuva =

Swedish Sámi visual and textile artist (born 1943)

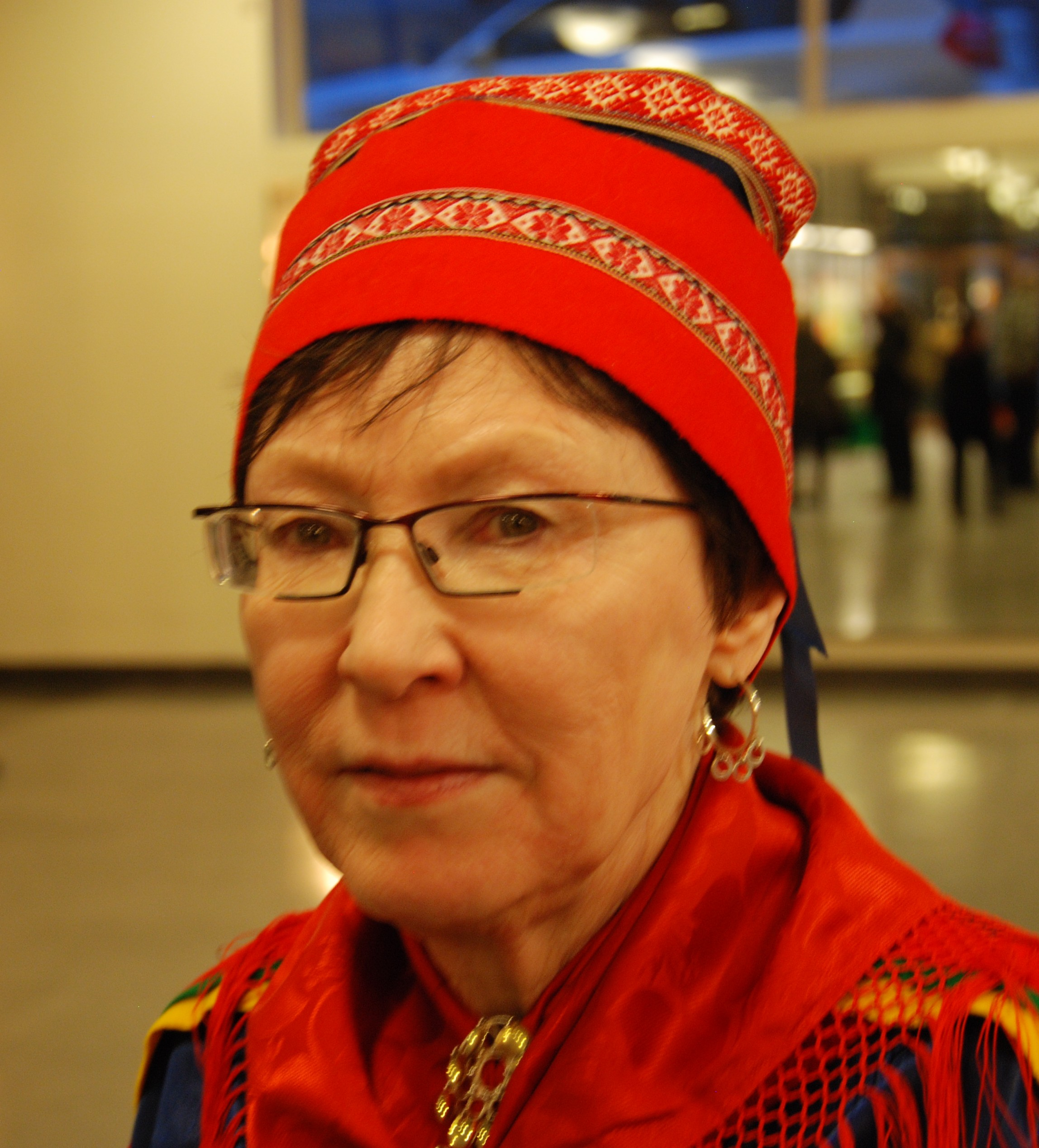
- Born: 13 July 1943; Jukkasjärvi församling
- Awards: Rubus Arcticus (2003)

Ragnel Rose-Marie Huuva (born 13 July 1943, in Rensjön, Gabna Sami village, Kiruna Municipality) is a Swedish Sámi visual and textile artist, as well as a poet. As a poet, she first became published in magazines and anthologies in 1981. Her lyrical breakthrough occurred in 1999 with the poetry collection Galbma Radna ("Cold comrade"). She was nominated for the Nordic Council's Literature Prize in 2001. In 2003 she was awarded the Cultural Scholarship Rubus arcticus.

Beside Swedish her poems were also translated to Icelandic and Finnish as well as German.

== Bibliography ==
- Rose-Marie Huuva: Galbma rádná, DAT, Guovdageaidnu 1999, ISBN 82-90625-36-7 (in Northern Sami)
- Rose-Marie Huuva: Kall kamrat, DAT, Guovdageaidnu 2001, ISBN 82-90625-38-3) (in Swedish)
- Rose-Marie Huuva, Inghilda Tapio, Inghilda, Thomas Marainen and Simon Marainen: Viidát: divttat Sámis / Vidd: dikter från Sápmi, Podium, Stockholm 2006, ISBN 91-89196-39-2 (in Swedish)
- Rose-Marie Huuva: Li mihkkege leat, DAT, Guovdageaidnu 2006, ISBN 82-90625-53-7 (in Northern Sami)
- Rose-Marie Huuva: Mjukt smeker molnets rand, Podium, Stockholm 2011, ISBN 978-91-7437-107-9) (in Swedish)

== See also ==
- List of Nordic Council's Literature Prize winners and nominees
