= Margaretha Zetterberg =

Finnish artist (1733–1803)

Margaretha "Greta" Zetterberg (1733–1803) was a Finnish textile and handcrafts worker who lived her entire life in what was then Sweden. She is regarded as a pioneer within the linen industry in Finland. She was the first female in Finland to be given a financed study trip abroad by the authorities: she was sent to Stockholm to study the textile industry, and brought with her the latest technique, especially within the linen industry, to Borgå (Porvoo) in Finland, where she was active.

== See also ==
- Elisabeth Forsell
