= Ulla Eson Bodin =

Swedish textile artist and designer

Ulla Eson Bodin

Ulla Birgitta Eson Bodin née Ericsson (1935–2009) was a Swedish textile artist who designed textiles for everything from interior furnishings to costumes for the stage. For over 30 years, she worked at Almedahls AB where she became head designer. As professor of the Swedish School of Textiles at the University of Borås, she helped to establish the international reputation of her department as well as Sweden's association with smart textiles.

== Early life and education ==
Born in Gothenburg on 11 May 1935, Ulla Birgitta Eson Ericsson was the daughter of the architect Karl Harald Ericsson and Sara Katarina Rosina née Norling. She was brought up in Borås where her father worked. After studying pattern making at the School of Textiles, from 1955 to 1958, she studied textile art at the Gothenburg College of Art and Design (HDK Högskolan). In 1958, she married Gustaf Harald Bodin with whom she had three children: Johan, Sofia and Josefina.

== Career ==
After completing her studies, Eson Bodin divided her time as a freelance designer and an employee at textile firms including Bohus Stickning and Almedahls. From the early 1970s, she became Almedahls' principal designer of patterns, creating lively and colourful cotton prints which have continued to attract interest in the second-hand market. Working mainly with a variety of natural materials, she designed clothes, interior furnishings, leather wear, slippers, knitted items, underwear and nightwear. Her creations for leisure wear collections produced by FOV Fabrics and Almedahls gained popularity abroad, particularly in Germany and the UK.

In the early 1990s, she began to devote some of her time to giving courses in textile prints, tricot items, display and fashion illustrations at the Borås Textile School. In 1996, she was appointed adjunct professor, increasingly developing her skills as a teacher and researcher. In 1998, she established the Stickakademi bringing together students, designers, educators and textile producers interested in tricot knitting.

In the early 2000s, in collaboration with Folke Sandvik AB, Eson Bodin developed cullus, a flexible knitted material used in sound proofing. She went on to design costumes for the opera productions at Vadstena Academy and taught costume design at Gothenburg University's school of opera.

Ulla Eson Bodin died on 19 August 2009. She is buried together with her husband at the St Sigfrid cemetery in Borås. An extensive exhibition of her work was held in the Borås Museum of Art in early 2010.
