= Ann-Mari Kornerup =

Swedish-Danish textile artist

Emilie Anna Maria Kornerup née Bruzelius (1918–2006) was a Swedish-Danish textile artist who specialized in embroidery and tapestry. She produced works for decorating public buildings and churches, including the Danish Parliament and Roskilde Cathedral. Kornerup was also active as a teacher with the Haandarbejdets Fremme textile guild and the Danish School of Arts and Crafts.

== Early life and education ==
Born on 9 December 1918 on the island of Lidingö in Stockholm, Sweden, Emilie Anna Maria Bruzelius was the daughter of the pharmacist Niels Idar Carl Johan Bruzelius (1869–1952) and Jenny Maria Sandberg (1877–1961), a teacher. She was brought up in a well-to-do academic environment together with her four brothers and her twin sister. Her initial interest in textiles stemmed from her mother's weaving. From 1935, she studied first at Konstfack, then at the Textile Institute in Borås (1937–39) and finally from 1940 until 1944 at the Högre Konstindustriella Skolan (Higher Art and Crafts School). While still studying, she worked for a time at Elsa Gullberg's textile establishment in Vaxholm.

In 1946, she married the Danish architect Jørgen Ebbe Kornerup (1910–97) and moved with him to Denmark.

== Career ==
In 1951, Kornerup opened a weaving workshop in Charlottenlund where she produced tapestries and embroidered works, often creating scenes of everyday life, sometimes with children. In parallel, until 1961, she taught composition at Haandarbejdets Fremme, which had become a focus for Danish textile art. She also taught embroidery, sewing and weaving at the Danish School of Arts and Crafts (1960–73). As described in her Broderiformning (1969), she engaged in experimental teaching under the Gentofte municipal authority, using new materials for both adults and primary school children. For many years, she taught textile art in teachers training colleges. Her Embroidery for Children was published in English in 1971.

She exhibited her work from the 1950s in Denmark and abroad. Study trips until the 1970s in Europe, the Middle East and the United States widened her mastery of embroidery and weaving. She assisted with the management of the Artists' Autumn Exhibitions, becoming a central figure in Danish textile art. Her decorative work was commissioned for banks, hotels, public buildings, schools, churches and the Danish Parliament. Her work can be seen in the Danish Design Museum and in the Cooper Hewitt Museum in New York.

Ann-Mari Kornerup died in 2006.

== Awards ==
In addition to numerous grants and scholarships, Kornerup received the silver medal for the Venice Biennale in 1946 and first prize for the Haandarbejdets Fremme embroidery contest in 1963.
