= Gerda Bengtsson =

Danish textile artist

Gerda Johanne Bengtsson (6 February 1900 – 13 December 1995) was a Danish textile artist who specialized in embroidery. Initially inspired by the stylized animals and plants used in medieval needlework, she became an outstanding designer who could transform depictions of wild flowers into simple but effective embroidery patterns. In 1980, she published the popular Danish Floral Charted Designs.

== Early life ==
Born on 6 February 1900 in the Copenhagen district of Frederiksberg, Gerda Johanna Bengtson was the daughter of two schoolteachers: Svend Otto Bengtsson (1871–1956) and Elise Marie Lassen (1873–1956). Showing an early interest in drawing, she was supported in her artistic ambitions by both her parents. After attending Frederiksberg Technical School, she studied painting at the Royal Danish Academy of Fine Arts (1919–24) under Gotfred Rode, Sigurd Wandel and, during her final year, the sculptor Einar Utzon-Frank. Of particular importance was the instruction she received in textile art from Astrid Holm who introduced her to tapestry work.

== Career ==
Bengtsson later travelled to Paris on an extended study trip where she carefully studied the floral decorations on tapestries from the Middle Ages in the Musée de Cluny. These served as an inspiration for her many colourful cross-stitch patterns representing wild flowers, herbs and other plants. Her early work also reflects the stitch-work techniques practised by Kristiane Konstantin-Hansen and Johanne Bindesbøll. She soon moved from tapestry and weaving to the more straightforward cross-stitch approach, often basing her work on classical designs or the large tablecloths embroidered by the artist Else Johnsen (1898–1957). She was particularly adept at creating cross-stitch patterns for a wide range of applications, including tablecloths, bed covers, serviettes, tea cosies and bell pulls. Making use of her own colour-identification system, these easy-to-use patterns could be followed by women without special training.

From 1939, Bengtsson taught at the Selskabet til Haandarbejdets Fremme establishment which also published her patterns. Lifelong collaboration followed. While she is remembered above all for her floral designs, she also produced other designs with figures and birds. Examples of her work can be seen in several Danish museums, especially the Danish Museum of Art & Design. Bengtsson was awarded a gold medal in 1951 at the Milan Triennial IX. Her patterns and publications have become popular not only in Denmark but in many other countries, especially the United States. They have been translated into several languages.

Gerda Bengtsson died in Frederiksberg on 13 December 1995. She is buried in Hellebæk Cemetery.

== Publications ==
Bengtsson's publications in English include:

- 1972: Book of Danish stitchery
- 1973: Flower designs in cross-stitch
- 1977: U.S. State flowers in counted cross-stitch
- 1979: Herbs and medicinal plants in cross-stitch from the Danish Handcraft Guild
- 1980: Danish floral charted designs
- 1983: Dye plants and fruits in cross-stitch : from the Danish Handcraft Guild
- 1986: Roses and flowering branches in counted cross-stitch : from the Danish Handcraft Guild
