= Anna Sofie Boesen Dreijer =

Danish schoolteacher (1899–1986)

Anna Sofie Boesen Dreijer (30 January 1899 – 27 July 1986) was a Danish schoolteacher who is remembered for her interest in Danish folklore and traditional dance costumes. Together with Ellen Andersen of the Danish Folk Museum, over a period of 30 years she produced "costume envelopes" or dragtkuverter for some 100 costumes, each envelope containing patterns for one or more costumes from a given area.

== Biography ==
Born on 30 January 1899 in Kolding, Anna Sofie Boesen Dreijer was the daughter of the postmaster Mads Christian Dreijer (1861–1924) and the schoolteacher Anna Johanne Marie née Boesen (1867–1959). On qualifying as a schoolteacher at N. Zahle's School in 1922, she spent three years as a teacher in Nykøbing Falster and then moved to Copenhagen where she taught until 1966. One of her subjects was handicrafts.

In 1922, she became a member of Foreningen til Folkedansens Fremme (Association for the Promotion of Folk Dance) which since its establishment in 1901 had collected information on Danish folk music and folk dances. The association created dolls in regional costumes which they lent out to members who wished to create traditional clothing. Realizing there was a need for more practical guidelines, in 1940 Boesen Dreijer contacted the museum inspector Ellen Andersen of the Danish Folk Museum with a view to accessing their collection of traditional costumes. Over the next 30 years, she produced about a hundred "costume envelopes". Each envelope provided a description of one or more costumes from a given region, complete with weaving instructions, colour samples and knitting and embroidery patterns. The envelopes could be obtained on loan from the association. Boesen Dreijer continued to coordinate costume descriptions until 1972, after which a "costume committee" was created to continue her work.

Anna Sophie Boesen Dreijer died on 27 July 1986 in Fredericia.
