= Thyra Grafström =

Swedish artist (1864–1925)

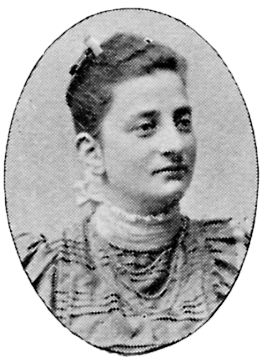
Portrait of Grafström published in 1901

Inga Thyra Carola Grafström (1 November 1864 – 16 April 1925) was a Swedish textile artist.

Thyra Boklund was born in Stockholm, one of seven children of Johan Christoffer Boklund, and Johanna Carola, née Stuttgardter. Her father was a painter and a curator at the national museum, and several of her siblings followed artistic careers. She married Jean Grafström, an opera singer, in 1891, and their son Bo was born in 1896.

She attended the technical college which is now Konstfack and also studied painting under Kerstin Cardon. In 1882 she worked for the association Handarbetets vänner (Friends of Handicraft), which promoted Swedish textile design.

She opened her textile atelier in 1897 in Stockholm's Birger Jarlsgatan, and in 1898, now employing 60 people, moved it into the new department store opened by K.M. Lundberg, which in 1902 became part of Nordiska Kompaniet (NK). In 1922 she left NK and opened Thyra Grafströms Textilaffär AB in Mäster Samuelsgatan. After her death in 1925 the business there was continued by first Elsa Gullberg and then Ellen Ståhlbrand.

Grafström has been described as "one of the most influential women in the artistically developing textile field at the turn of the century". Her work is represented in the Swedish Nationalmuseum by "Hortensier" and "Antependium", both designed by Annie Frykholm (1872–1955).
