= Gerda Henning =

Danish weaver, textile artist and educator (1891–1951)

Gerda Henning née Heydorn (March 2, 1891 – June 26, 1951) was a Danish weaver, textile designer and educator.

== Biography ==
Born Gerda Heydorn in Fredriksberg, Denmark, she was the daughter of a grocer. From 1910 to 1917 she worked as a china painter in a porcelain factory. It was there that she met Danish sculptor Gerhard Henning, whom she married and with whom she occasionally collaborated.

From china painting, Henning moved into embroidery and thence into the production of silk textiles inspired by European folk art. In 1922, she founded her own weaving studio, and in 1928 she started teaching at (and later ran) the textile department at the School of Arts and Crafts in Copenhagen, Denmark. Here and in her own studio she trained a generation of textile artists and designers who became influential in the development of the Danish modern style, including Lis Ahlmann, Vibeke Klint, Ea Koch, and John Kristian Becker.

Henning became known for reviving the country's tradition of handwoven rugs and introducing a fashion for natural-fiber rugs. She collaborated with noted furniture designers such as Kaare Klint and Mogens Koch, and she was commissioned to make textiles for Copenhagen City Hall. In 1929 and again in 1936 she had solo shows at the Danish Museum of Art & Design, which today holds some of her work.

She died in Copenhagen.
