= Lis Ahlmann =

Danish designer (1894–1979)

Mathilde Elisabeth "Lis" Ahlmann (April 13, 1894 – January 15, 1979) was a Danish weaver and textile designer who was one of the founders of modern Danish textile art and influential in the development of the style known as Danish modern.

== Biography ==
Born in Aarhus, Denmark, she trained with weaving master Gerda Henning, completing her apprenticeship in 1929. She also studied painting with Harad Giersing and worked for a time as a China painter for Kähler Keramik. She traveled around Europe for further studies.

She opened her own workshop in 1934, and during that decade worked with furniture designer Kaare Klint, most notably designing the hand-woven fabrics for his famous Circle Bed (Kugleseng). By 1938 she had begun to exhibit her textiles, and she became known for a strongly geometric style featuring stripes and checks, initially in earth tones. Drawing on both traditional Danish folk patterns and Bauhaus ideas, her work in this decade with fabrics designed to complement furniture helped to shape the style now known as Danish modern.

During World War II, she worked with Børge Mogensen to create fabrics for his new line of mass-produced beechwood furniture inspired by Shaker designs. This collaboration marked a shift in her production towards industrially produced designs as the scale of production exceeded what was possible with hand-woven textiles. She continued to work with Morgensen, and her palette of muted colors and grays became brighter, complementing the oak that was his preferred material after the war.

Although Ahlmann herself worked only with wool and cotton (never synthetics), she developed a reputation for being able to cross easily between the techniques of hand weaving and the demands of industrial textile production. She later created designs for other textile manufacturers, such as C. Olesen Co. in the 1950s.

Ahlemann's designs are considered timeless, and her stature in the field was recognized in 1948 with the Tagea Brandt Rejselegat, a travel scholarship awarded to outstanding Danish women, and again in 1978 when she received the Royal Swedish Academy of Art's C. F. Hansen Medal.
