= Marie Gudme Leth =

Danish textile designer (1895–1997)

Marie Christine Mathea Gudme Leth (5 October 1895 – 17 December 1997) was a Danish textile printer who pioneered screen printing for industrial production. In 1941, she opened her own workshop where she first concentrated on prints of flowers and animals before turning to more geometrical designs.

== Early life ==
Born in Aarhus, Leth attended the Industrial Arts and Crafts School for Women before entering the Royal Danish Academy of Fine Arts. In 1921, she travelled to Java where she spent three years with her sister. There she became acquainted with the Indonesian techniques associated with the production of batik. As it was her ambition to raise the status of textile printing to the level of other crafts, she soon began experimenting with block printing. As Denmark lacked an educational venue for printed textiles, she left for Frankfurt-am-Main in 1930, where she studied print colouring at the design school and developed her own approach to colouring. She returned to Germany in 1934 to study print screening.

== Career ==
In 1931, Leth realized that techniques based on screen printing, which she had experienced while visiting a German factory in 1931, would enable similar industrial methods to be applied to textile printing. As a result, she opened and co-founded Dansk Kattuntrykkeri (Danish calico printing factory) in 1935. In 1940, once the factory was operating successfully, she opened her own design studio. From 1931 to 1948, she also taught textile printing at the Arts and Crafts School. Her pupils included Dorte Raachou and Rolf Middleboe.

Leth patterns, printed on linen or cotton, often worked two shades of one colour, particularly blues or greens. Her earlier block print creations including Jagten, Landsby and Mexico were inspired both by Danish themes and by her experiences abroad. They were characterized by simple designs like those in picture books. Her garden animal prints included frog, snail, and snake themes. When using the screen printing technique, she was able to extend her block printing patterns to silhouette-like prints where Danish plant designs intermingled with those from primeval forests, as in her Orkidé prints. These led in turn to freer, more natural floral designs while her colour combinations evolved from a few contrasting colours to a variety of nuances. In the 1950s, she abandoned her free style, choosing instead strictly geometrical patterns, though she maintained her interest in harmonious colour combinations. In 1955, a journey to Ravenna where she experienced the ancient mosaics inspired her to design patterns with four or five colours depicting small medallions, hearts, leaves and wavy lines while later designs such as Mariati and Beirut were inspired by a trip to Turkey and the Middle East.

== Exhibitions and awards ==
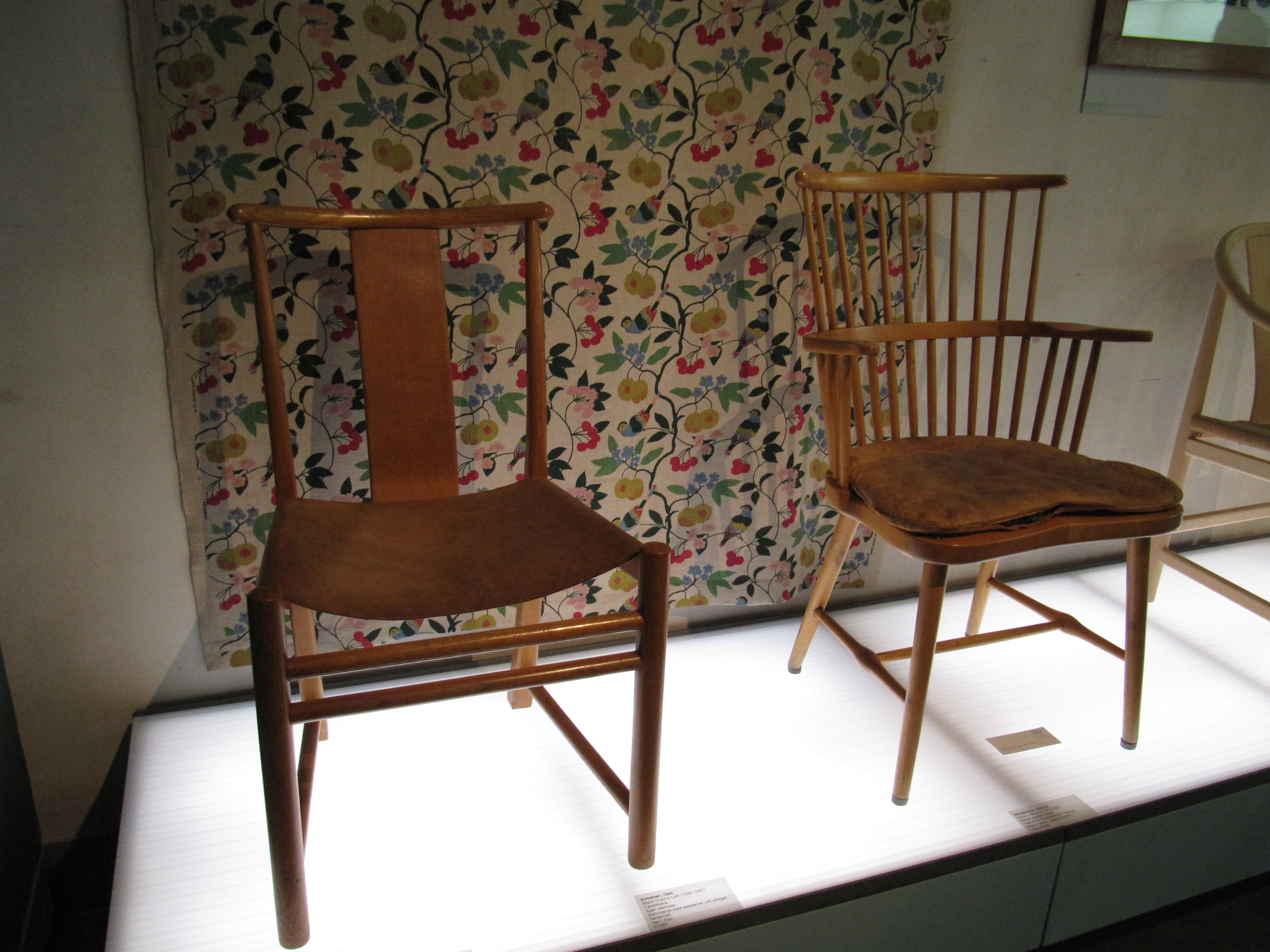
One of Leth's textiles seen as a backdrop to two chairs by Arne Jacobsen and Hans Wegner in the Danish Design Museum.

From the 1930s, Leth participated in all major exhibitions of Danish design at home and abroad. She was awarded gold medals at the Paris Exhibition in 1937 and at the Milan Triennale in 1951. At an exhibition held to commemorate the 25th anniversary of her factory in 1960, it was explained that it was not only Leth's life work which was on display but the history of a new Danish craft. In 1977, a retrospective was held in the Danish Museum of Art & Design where many of her works can still be seen.
