= Vibeke Klint =

Danish textile artist (1927–2019)

- Born: Karen Vibeke Nielsen; 13 December 1927; Frederiksberg, Denmark
- Died: 30 December 2019 (aged 92)
- Education: Danmarks Designskole
- Known for: Textile
- Spouse: Morten Le Klint

Karen Vibeke Klint (née Nielsen; 13 December 1927 - 30 December 2019) was a Danish textile artist who created a wide variety of tapestries, carpets, silks and home textiles, initially inspired by Functionalism. Her work has been used to decorate concert halls, embassies, ministries and churches. While her own creations were frequently inspired by geometrical patterns, she also produced tapestries based on cartoons by William Scharff and Palle Nielsen.

== Early life and education ==
Born on 13 December 1927 in Frederiksberg, Karen Vibeke Nielsen was the daughter of the editor Gunnar Lorens Christian Nielsen (1901–52) and Karen Gudrun Skou (1905–66). When she was six, the family moved to Aarhus where her father became the editor of the local newspaper Århus Stiftstidende. In 1942, she and her two younger sisters moved back to Copenhagen where her father had been appointed editor of Nationaltidende. While at school, she took private art lessons with Poul Sæbye and later with Bizzie Høyer. When she was 19, she studied weaving under Gerda Henning at the School of Arts and Crafts, graduating in 1949.

== Career ==
Klink was first engaged by Karen Warming where she wove long lengths of furniture upholstery. Happy to find something less boring, she immediately took up an offer from Gerda Henning to work on creating tapestries for the parliamentary chamber at Christiansborg. In order to prepare her for the task, Henning sent her to France where she learnt the art of tapestry under Jean Lurçat and Pierre Wemaëre. Her stay was cut short when Gerda Henning died in 1951. Her husband, Gerhard Henning helped her to take over the workshop which she later moved to Tårbæk where she lived. The Christiansborg project fell through but in 1954 she began work on tapestries for Egmont H. Petersens Kollegium in Copenhagen, inspired by William Scharff's cartoons. That year she also began to work for the architect Mogens Koch, creating textiles for the Danish Church in London, St Jørgensbjerg Church in Roskilde and Holbæk Church.

In 1954, Vibeke Nielsen married Morten Le Klint (1918–1978), son of the architect Kaare Klint, with whom she had three children: Peter, Jakob and Le.

In the 1960s, Klint created the tapestry Den barmhjertige samaritan (The Merciful Samaritan) from a cartoon by Palle Nielsen, for Fredericia Town Hall. In 1977, she designed the main curtain for Gladsaxe Church and in 1979, textiles for Copenhagen's Vor Frue Kirke. The same year, together with Randi Studsgarth, she organized the groundbreaking exhibition Danske ægte Tæpper in the Nikolaj Kunsthal, an exhibition venue in Copenhagen, presenting the recent works of Danish textile artists. In the 1980s, she created textiles for decorating a number of churches in Denmark, and for Danish embassies in Washington D.C., Lima, Paris and Nairobi.

== Awards ==
Vibeki Klink received many awards including the Eckersberg Medal (1978), the Prince Eugen Medal (1996) and the Order of the Dannebrog (2000).
