= Cilluf Olsson =

Swedish artist (1847–1916)

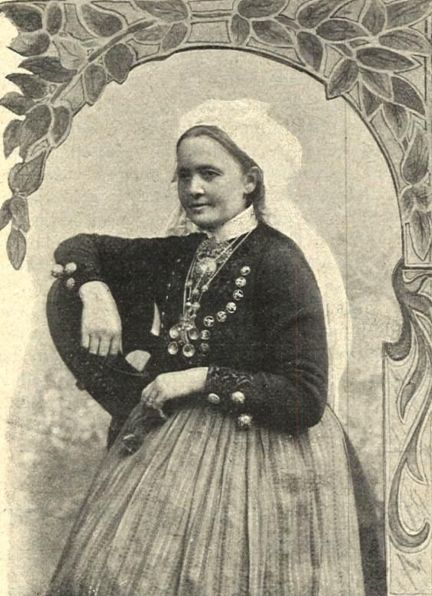
A picture of Cilluf Olsson Swedish art weaver (1847–1916)

Cilluf Olsson (15 February, 1847 – 5 March, 1916) was a Swedish textile artist. She was an important figure within Svensk Hemslöjd (Swedish Handicraft Association).

She was born to the wealthy farmer and local politician Sven Nilsson and Elna Ahlgren and married in 1874 to the farmer Christen Olsson.

In 1888, she founded a weaving school and work shop, which manufactured traditional textile handicrafts artwork. She also collected older textile artwork. She is credited in art history with having preserved many old traditional weaving and textile methods, colors and patterns, which were in danger of being extinct during the industrialization.

She participated in numerous international exhibitions, such as Nordic Exhibition of 1888, World's Columbian Exposition and Exposition Universelle (1900), as well as national exhibitions such as General Art and Industrial Exposition of Stockholm and Baltic Exhibition and were awarded many medals.

Some of her artwork is preserved at the Nordic Museum.
