= Swedish carpets and rugs =

Textile art from Sweden

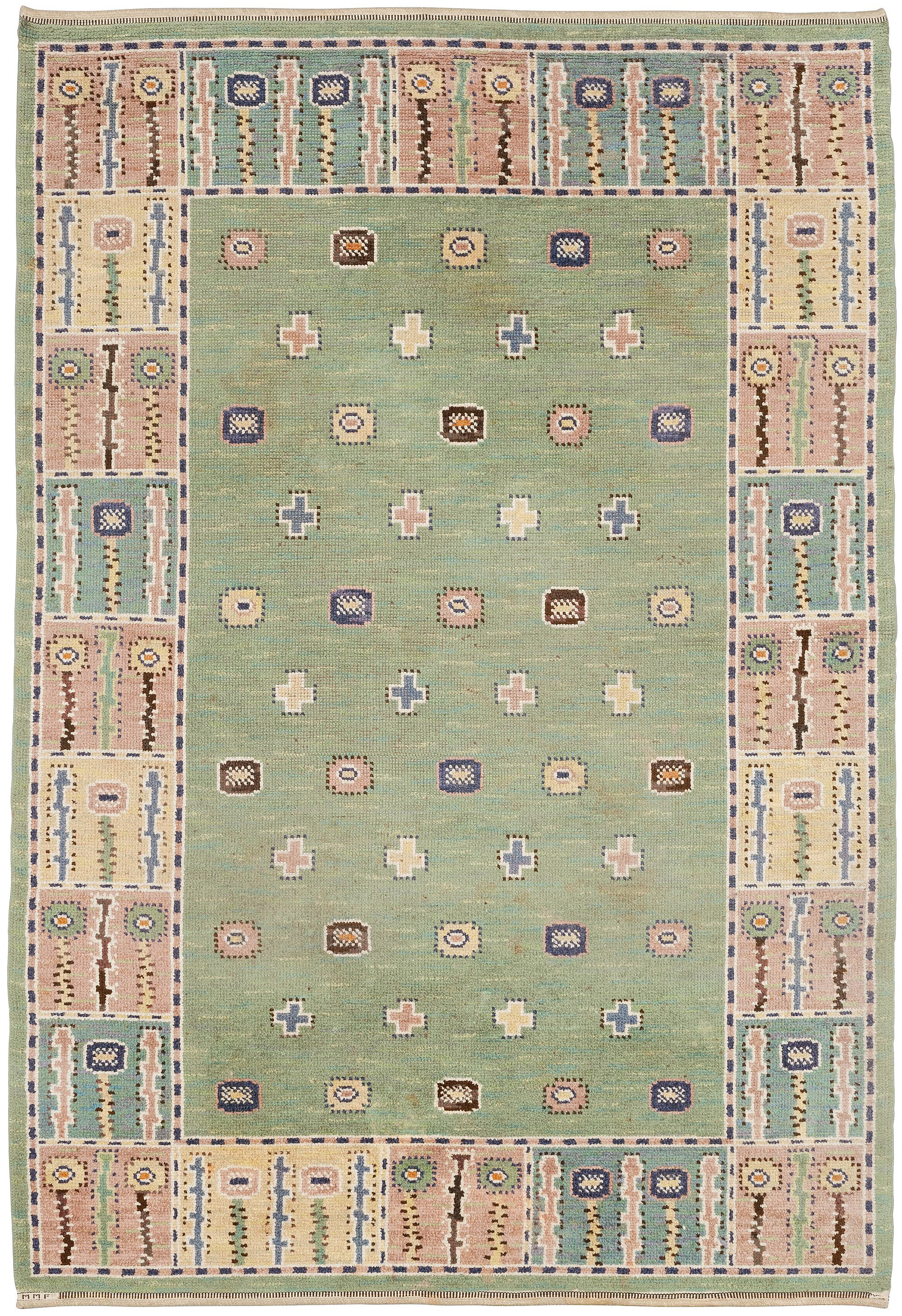
An antique Swedish carpet from the Doris Leslie Blau Collection

Carpets and rugs have been handmade in Sweden for centuries, taking on many different forms and functions over the course of time. Rugs woven in the traditional Oriental manner, especially in the Ottoman Empire and points east, were originally brought to Sweden over trade routes as early as the early Middle Ages. In the centuries that followed, Swedish rug-makers often infused their works with themes and motifs traditionally found in Oriental rugs. Eventually, Swedish rug-makers would begin to use Oriental rug-making techniques, but themes and motifs more consistent with the artistic and cultural heritage of Sweden. By the early modern periods, rugs had long been an important avenue of art – especially folk art – in Swedish culture. By the beginning of the twentieth century, the craft was seen as being an important artistic and cultural practice throughout Sweden, and designers began to make rugs that had a broad international appeal. Swedish rugs from the mid-twentieth century remain among the most desirable and sought after in the rug world.

== History ==
The history of Swedish rugs reads similarly to the broader history of Scandinavian rugs, though with several distinctive developments. Swedish people were creating weaves for a very long time before the craft began to be taken seriously as a valid avenue of Swedish artistic expression. One of the most important Swedish rug-making techniques to have widespread practice and implementation was that which resulted in Rollakans, which are traditional flat weaves. Very popular among Swedish folk-artists, Rollakans were often used as bed coverings and for general display purposes, and, as such, often featured appealing all-over patterns. Such rugs are very highly sought after in today’s rug market due to their perception as quintessentially Swedish compositions.

A similar unique development in the history of Swedish rug-making is the rya, a very distinctive Swedish style of rug. Unlike its cousin the flat-woven Rollakan, the rya is a long-pile sort of rug that was originally developed for use as protection from the harsh arctic climate of Sweden. Utilizing the weaving and knotting techniques that were introduced into early Middle Ages Sweden by travellers and traders from the Ottoman Empire, Swedish rug-makers began in earnest the manufacture of the rugs that would become ryas.

Despite not being a craft of Swedish origin, centuries of rug-making firmly established the practice as an important Swedish cultural tradition. By the modern period, Sweden had a long-established heritage of rug-making.

=== Textile art of Scania ===
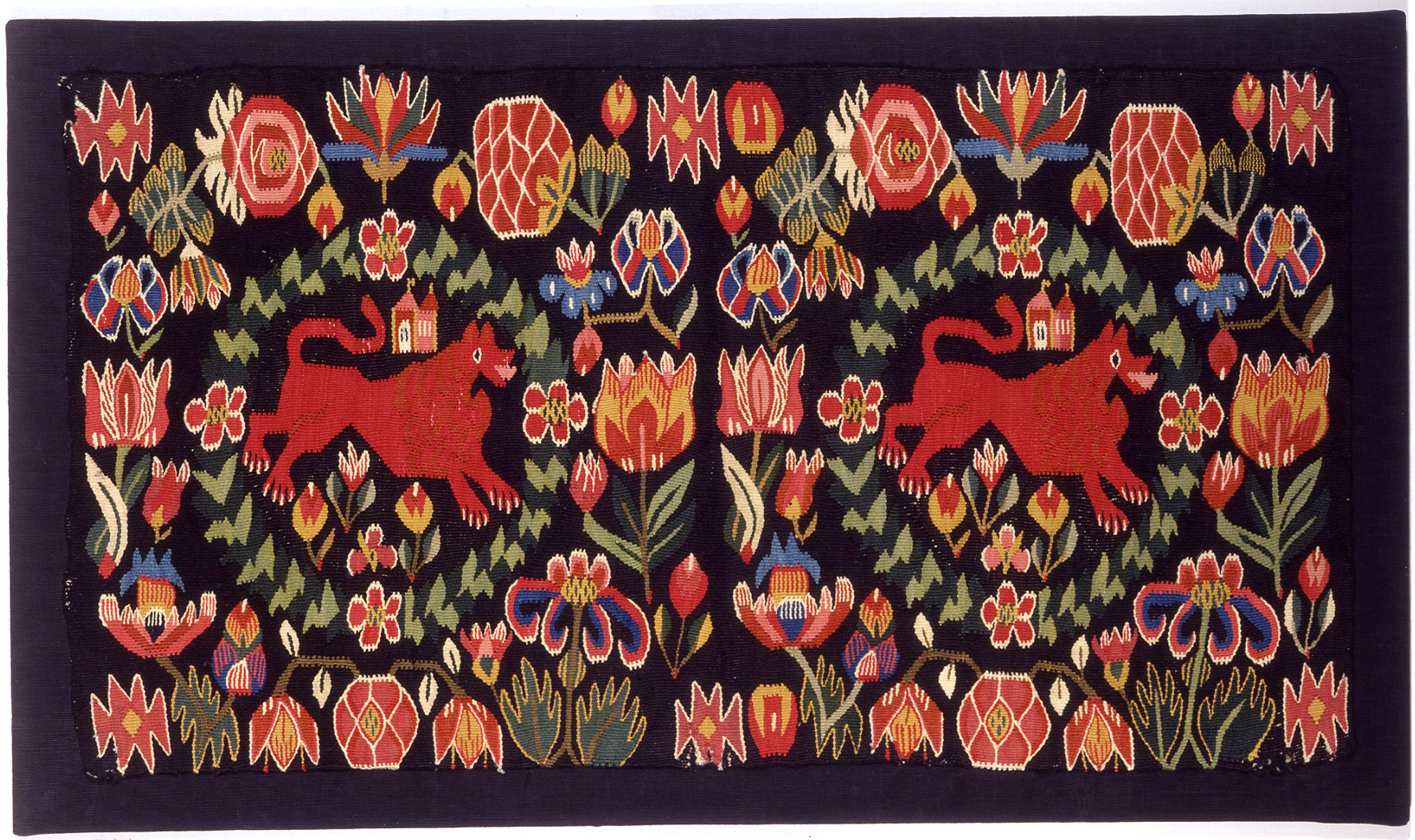
Carriage cushion cover, Scania, Bara district, late 18th century. From the Khalili Collection of Swedish textiles

Handwoven textile art flourished in Scania from the mid-eighteenth to the mid-nineteenth century. Employment in Scania was mainly in farming, and the early eighteenth century was a time of relative peace and prosperity for farmers, with far fewer epidemics than previously. The women of land-owning families, with the skills for making clothes and furnishings, thus had the leisure time and materials to make textiles with a focus on beauty rather than for use as covering. These textiles would usually be kept in a wooden chest, only brought out for special occasions or for airing. Wealthy farms would often have a dedicated chamber for these chests.

The textiles use variations of a set of design motifs, including hunt scenes, stars, and geometrical shapes. Despite this, each textile is different; they achieve variety by colour, size, positioning and combination of the motifs. Designs show a lot of similarity across the different techniques, apart from dove-tail tapestry, whose designs are more realistic and naturalistic. Whereas stylised animals within octagons are a common motif for the other textiles, dove-tail tapestries more often have a naturalistic animal or bird within a circle. A textile creator would rarely venture beyond her own village, so her imagery would have been drawn from nature and from local superstition and religion. Another influence was textile art from other cultures. For thousands of years, textiles had been traded across Europe and Asia, and pictorial designs from the Near East are known to have been imported to Sweden by the fourteenth or fifteenth century.

The creators of these works were exclusively women: farmers' wives, other female members of the family, or occasionally maids. Some works bear initials, but the identity of the creators is unknown. The creation of a dowry was an important tradition, and for each wedding the bride would demonstrate her skill by creating unique textiles with symbolic decorations. From the mid-nineteenth century onwards, the collections were mostly sold off and put to everyday use, subjecting them to wear. Only a few thousand works from this period survive intact to the present day.

Only one professional textile artist in Scania is known from this period: Bengta Oredsdotter, also known as Bengta Årman. She was active from the late 1820s to the late 1850s. Her style, characterised by small, detailed motifs, was known and imitated by subsequent generations of Swedish textile artists.

=== Techniques and designs ===
- Dove-tail tapestry, also called flamskväv ("Flemish weave"): these are named for the joins between areas of colour, where weft threads of different areas connect around the same warp thread. This technique was common among wealthy Malmö households from the mid sixteenth century to the mid eighteenth. Many tapestries from this era have been lost in war and in fires. These tapestries are usually pictorial, depicting people, animals or flowers on a dark background. Religious scenes, especially the Annunciation, were common subjects. Hunting was another common subject.
- Interlocked tapestry or rölakan (various spellings): double interlocked tapestry, in which the weft threads interlock on the reverse of the textile, was a common technique in southern Sweden. Designs of these tapestries were typically geometrical, including stars, rosettes and octagons. Zig-zag patterns representing lightning, in a variety of colours and widths, were commonly used as both a motif and a background pattern. Interlocked tapestries mostly used linen for the warp threads and wool for the weft, with other fibres like hemp, jute, and cotton used much less frequently. The great majority of these tapestries come from Scania, which is why the technique is also known as "Scanian interlocked tapestry".
- Simple weaves: simple weaves with little or no pattern were normally used for parts of fabrics, including backings or foundations to which more decorative layers would be added.
- Weft patterning: in continuous weft patterning, weft threads do not turn at the edge of a motif. In extra-weft patterning, the pattern is produced by an additional set of weft threads. This is an old technique, dating back to Viking times, and was often used for the backs of textiles whose fronts were created with interlocked tapestry. There are several distinct styles of extra-weft patterning, including krabbasnär ("crab-snare"), halvkrabba ("half-crab"), munkabälte ("monk's belt"), opphämta ("up-catch") and dukagäng ("table-path").
- Knotted-pile weaves: flossa (piled weavings) were common as cushion or bed covers from the eighteenth century onwards. Coloured wool was wrapped around pairs of warp threads to create the pile surface, either by being cut of left as loops.
- Embroideries: these can be schattersöm ("wool embroidery"), which have an embroidered pattern on a plain background, or korsstygn ("cross-stitch") and tvistsöm ("twist-stitch") which involve a fully-embroidered surface.

== Twentieth century onwards ==
By the early twentieth century, artists and designers throughout Sweden were beginning to work with rugs. Designers such as Märta Måås-Fjetterström and Barbro Nilsson began designing rugs in the 1920s, and by the 1940s Swedish rugs were being acquired by collectors all over the world.

After being endorsed by proponents of modernism including Le Corbusier, Ray Eames and Frank Lloyd Wright, Swedish rugs quickly became a highly desirable commodity. The traditional geometric and abstract designs and the long pile of Rya rugs were considered especially desirable due to their perceived aesthetic complement to the hardwood, metal, and sparseness favored by modern designers. As homeowners began to transition toward a preference for modern aesthetics, it became difficult for Sweden to keep up with the demand for high-quality Ryas and other rugs. The design studio founded by Märta Måås-Fjetterström in 1919 – and later headed by Barbro Nilsson after Måås-Fjetterström’s death in 1941 – became an important center for Swedish rug design, and remains so today.

== Collections of Swedish textile art ==
Small collections of textile art remain in various museums and private collections.

- Nordic Museum, Stockholm
- Museum of Cultural History, Lund
- National Museum, Stockholm
- National Museum, Copenhagen
- Malmö Museum
- Trelleborg Museum
- Ystad Ancient Monument Association
- Österlen Museum
- Kristianstads County Museum
- Helsingborg Museum
- Landskrona Museum
- Eslör Museum
- Hörby Museum
- Blekinge County Museum
- Karlshamn Museum
- Smäland County Museum
- Halland County Museum
- Rohsska Museum of Applied Arts, Gothenburg
- Khalili Collection of Swedish Textiles
