= Embassy of Sweden, Washington, D.C. =

Diplomatic mission of Sweden to the United States

- Location: Washington, D.C.
- Address: 2900 K Street N.W. Washington, D.C. 20007-5118; USA
- Coordinates: 38°54′5.29″N 77°3′31.88″W
- Opening: 1812
- Ambassador: Nicola Clase
- Jurisdiction: United States
- Website: Official website

The Embassy of Sweden in Washington, D.C., is Sweden's diplomatic mission in the United States. The Swedish Embassy in Washington, D.C., is one of Sweden's largest diplomatic missions with more than fifty employees. Since August 2026, the ambassador has been Nicola Clase. Sweden also has consulates general in New York City, San Francisco and Houston, and a number of honorary consulates general in the United States. Since 2006, the chancery is located in the House of Sweden building on the Potomac River.

== History ==
Swedish-American relations have a long history stretching back to the 17th century when Sweden in 1638 established the colony of New Sweden in the state of Delaware. In 1782, diplomatic relations were established by Samuel Gustaf Hermelin. Sweden was the first country, in addition to the states that were directly involved in the American Revolutionary War (the United Kingdom and France), to recognize the United States in 1783. In 1783 the Treaty of Amity and Commerce between Sweden and the United States was signed.

A break in diplomatic relations occurred in 1973 when the then Ambassador Hubert de Bèsche and his newly elected successor Yngve Möller were declared undesirable in the United States as a result of a diplomatic crisis that followed Olof Palme's statement about the Hanoi bombings in December 1972. In 1974 the new Swedish Ambassador Wilhelm Wachtmeister took office and held the post until 1989. Wachtmeister was eventually given the title Dean of the Diplomatic Corps (Doyen) as the longest serving Ambassador in Washington, D.C. Other famous diplomats who held the Ambassador post are Jan Eliasson, Rolf Ekéus and Anders Thunborg.

The former embassy building was located at 2006 N Street, N.W., in a Victorian building at 2249 R Street, N.W., from 1921 to 1971 and in Suite 1200, Watergate Six Hundred, 600 New Hampshire Avenue along the banks of the Potomac River. The move to the Watergate complex represented a temporary solution to the embassy's space issues. The new premises were rented primarily for five years, pending a decision on the possible construction of a new embassy building on the government-owned plot at Nebraska Avenue, where the residence was located. In May 1987, it was reported that the annual fee for the 2,500 square meters the embassy rented in the Watergate complex was 7,000,000 SEK. At the same time, the embassy were also renting around forty residences in Washington for its staff.

When the rent in the Watergate complex became too high, the embassy was moved to a couple of floors at 1501 M Street, N.W. in Downtown. The idea had been for several decades to acquire an own embassy building but the idea had come unstuck because of few suitable sites. In August 2006, the embassy returned to the banks of the Potomac River when the new embassy building, the House of Sweden, opened on the waterfront in Georgetown. The site was bought by the National Property Board of Sweden from the Swede Kate Novak's husband Alan Novak's development company.

== Staff and tasks ==
=== Staff ===
The Embassy of Sweden in Washington is one of Sweden's largest foreign authorities with approximately fifty-five employees (August 2023).

=== Tasks ===
The embassy covers a range of policy areas including security, defense, climate and sustainability, trade, democracy, human rights, gender equality, and culture. The embassy also provides consular assistance to Swedish citizens and handles migration matters.

== Buildings ==
=== Chancery ===
==== 1913–2006 ====
From December 1, 1913 to 1920, the chancery was located at 2006 N Street N.W. From 1921 to 1922, the chancery was located at 1201 16th Street, N.W. From 1923 to June 30, 1971, the chancery was located at 2249 R Street, N.W. When the villa at 3900 Nebraska Avenue was purchased by the Swedish state in 1950 as the residence for the ambassador, the building on R Street was converted to serve solely as the chancery. Until then, it had also served as the residence. All chancery offices were relocated there, and consequently, the previous chancery building on 24th Street was put up for sale. Up to that point, the Swedish mission had office spaces at three different locations in Washington. From July 1, 1971 to 1994, the chancery was located in Suite 1200, Watergate Six Hundred at 600 New Hampshire Avenue. Upon moving in 1971, the interior design of the premises was estimated to cost 590,000 SEK, and the design of the space was overseen by the architect Björn Hultén from Gothenburg. The annual rent and operating costs amounted to approximately 900,000 SEK. On June 17, 1994, the chancery moved to 1501 M Street, N.W. Suite 900, where it remained until 2006.

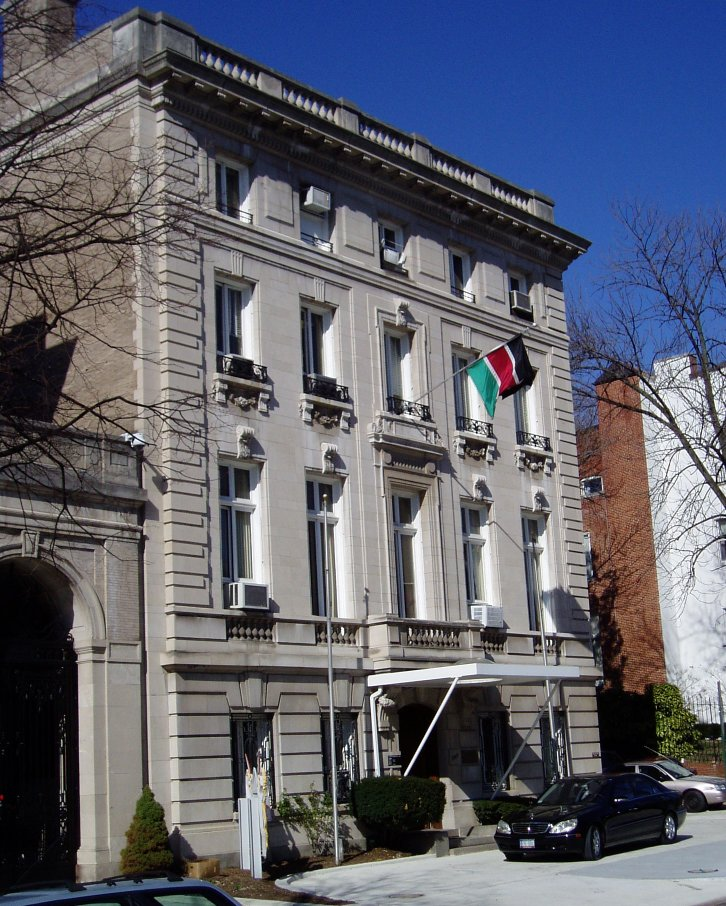
The chancery was 1923–1971 located here at 2249 R Street, N.W. Today it's used as the Kenyan embassy.

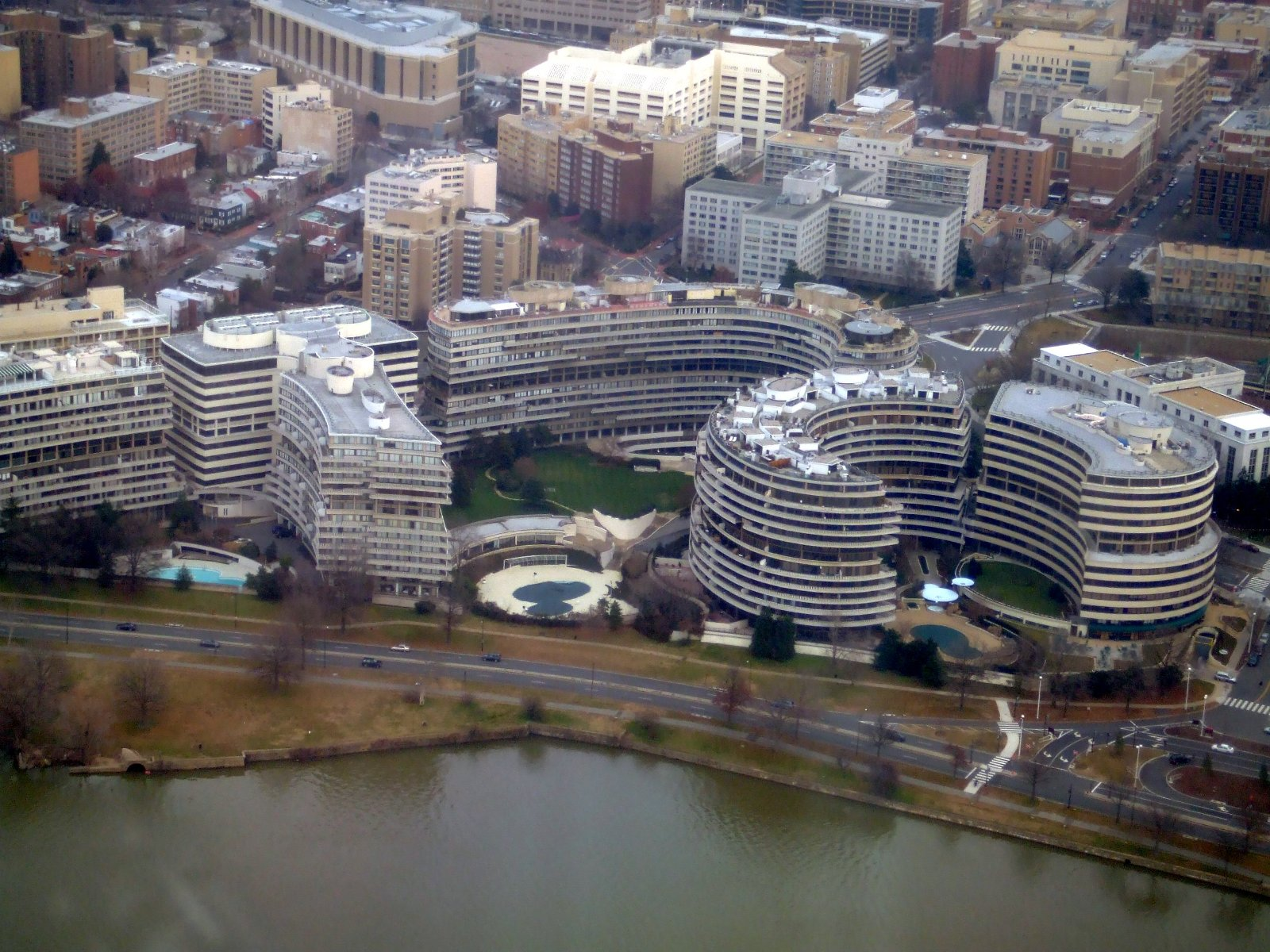
Watergate complex with Watergate Six Hundred to the right

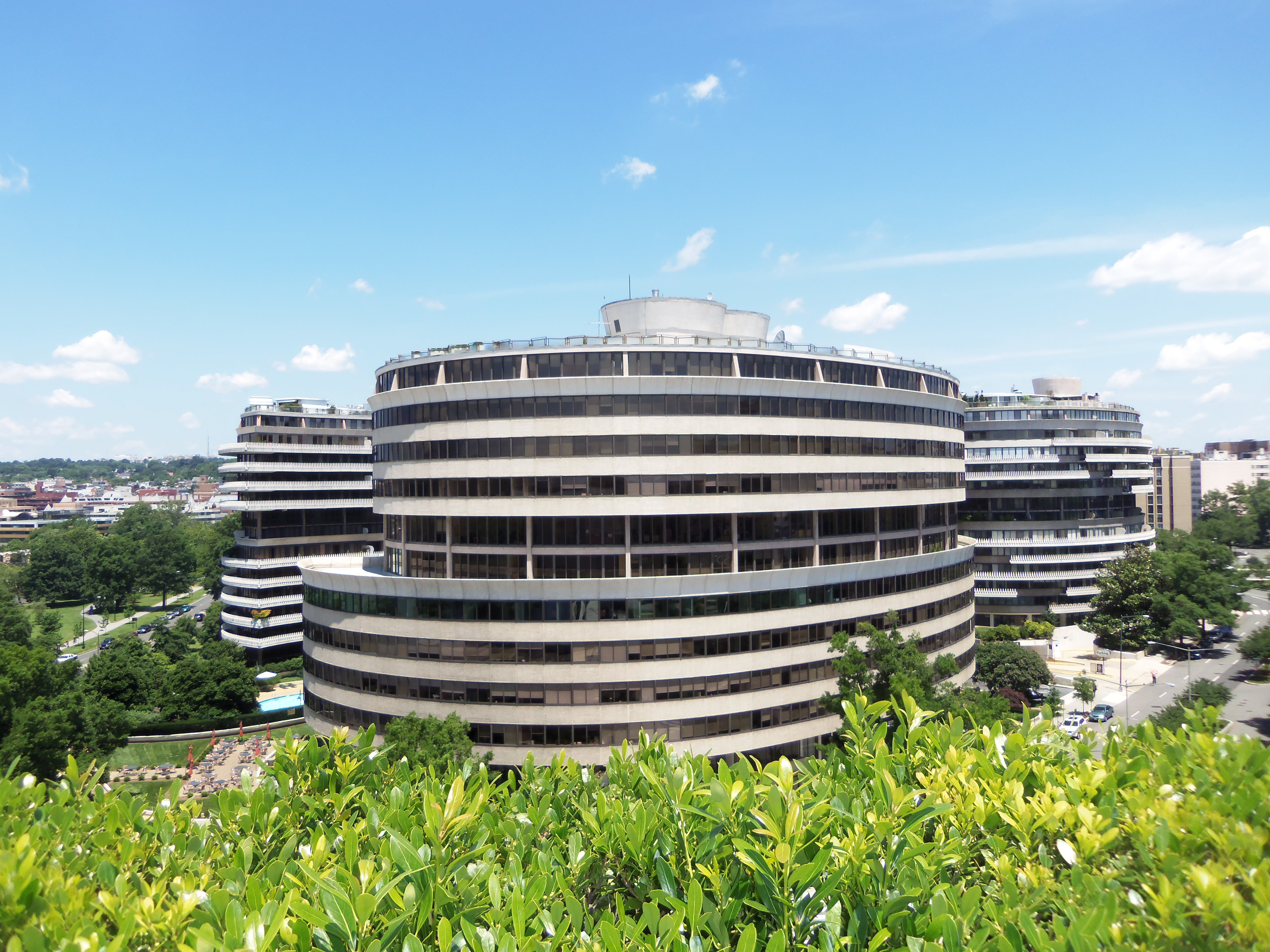
Watergate at 600 New Hampshire Avenue

==== 2006–present ====
The chancery has since 2006 been housed on the second floor of the then newly built and later the award-winning office and residential complex House of Sweden on 2900 K Street, N.W. on the Potomac River in Georgetown. House of Sweden is the result after an architectural competition which the National Property Board of Sweden announced in June 2002. The winning entry was selected by the jury in January 2003 and construction began in August 2004. In August 2006 the embassy staff moved in. The opening ceremony was held on October 23, 2006, in the presence of the King and Queen of Sweden.

The building was designed by architects Gert Wingårdh and Tomas Hansen and Wingårdh received the Architects Sweden's (Sveriges Arkitekter) Kasper Salin Prize in 2007 for the building. The Washington Post named the House of Sweden the "Venue of the Year" in 2008. The cost of construction amounted to 482 million SEK. House of Sweden houses the embassy building, embassy offices, 19 apartments and a 700 square metres (7,500 sq ft) event center with conference facilities and exhibition spaces. The building is about 6,400 square metres (69,000 sq ft) and is managed by the National Property Board of Sweden. In 2009 Sweden and Iceland signed a 15-year long contract for office and a residential apartment for the Embassy of Iceland in the House of Sweden.

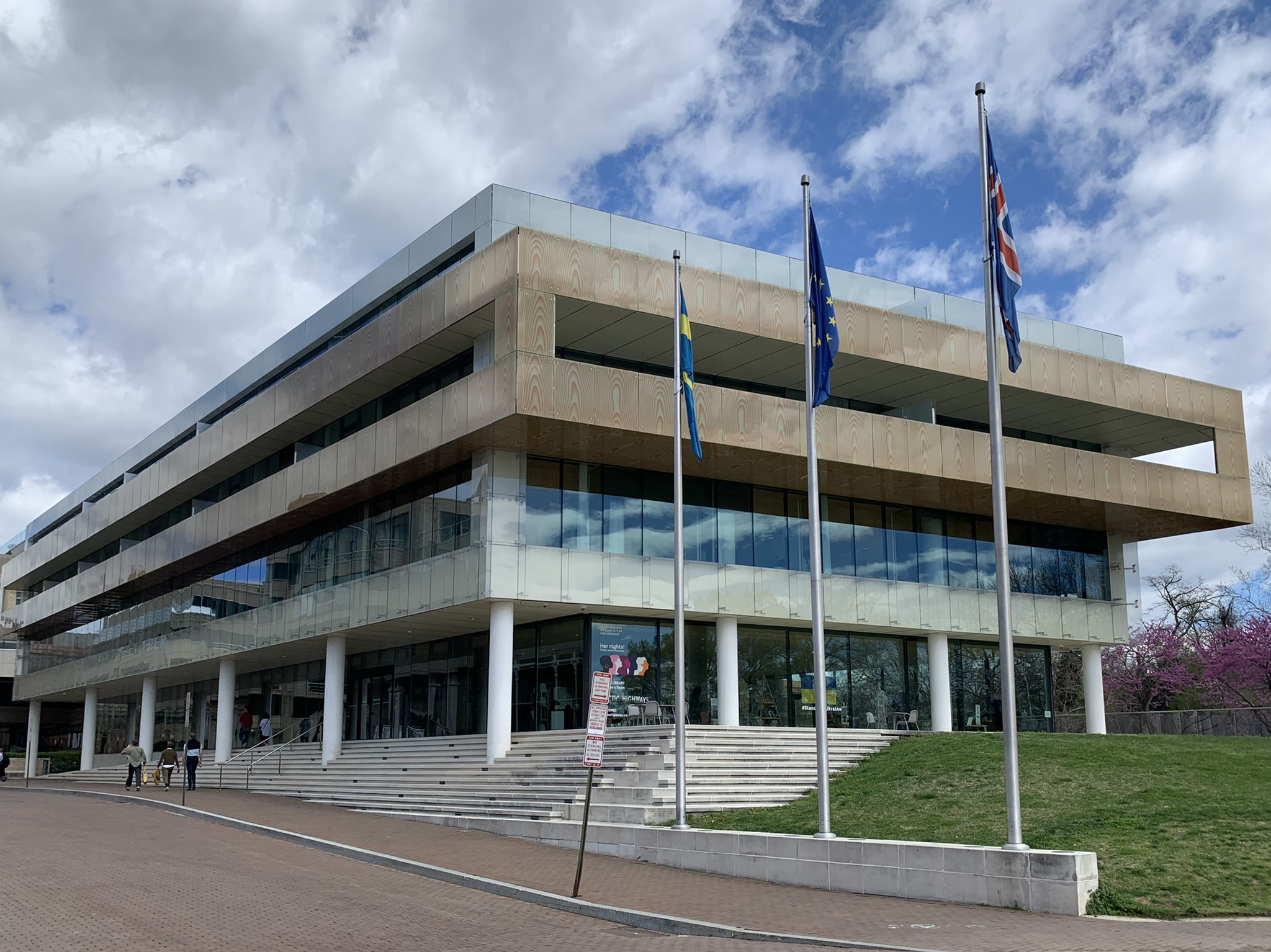
Exterior

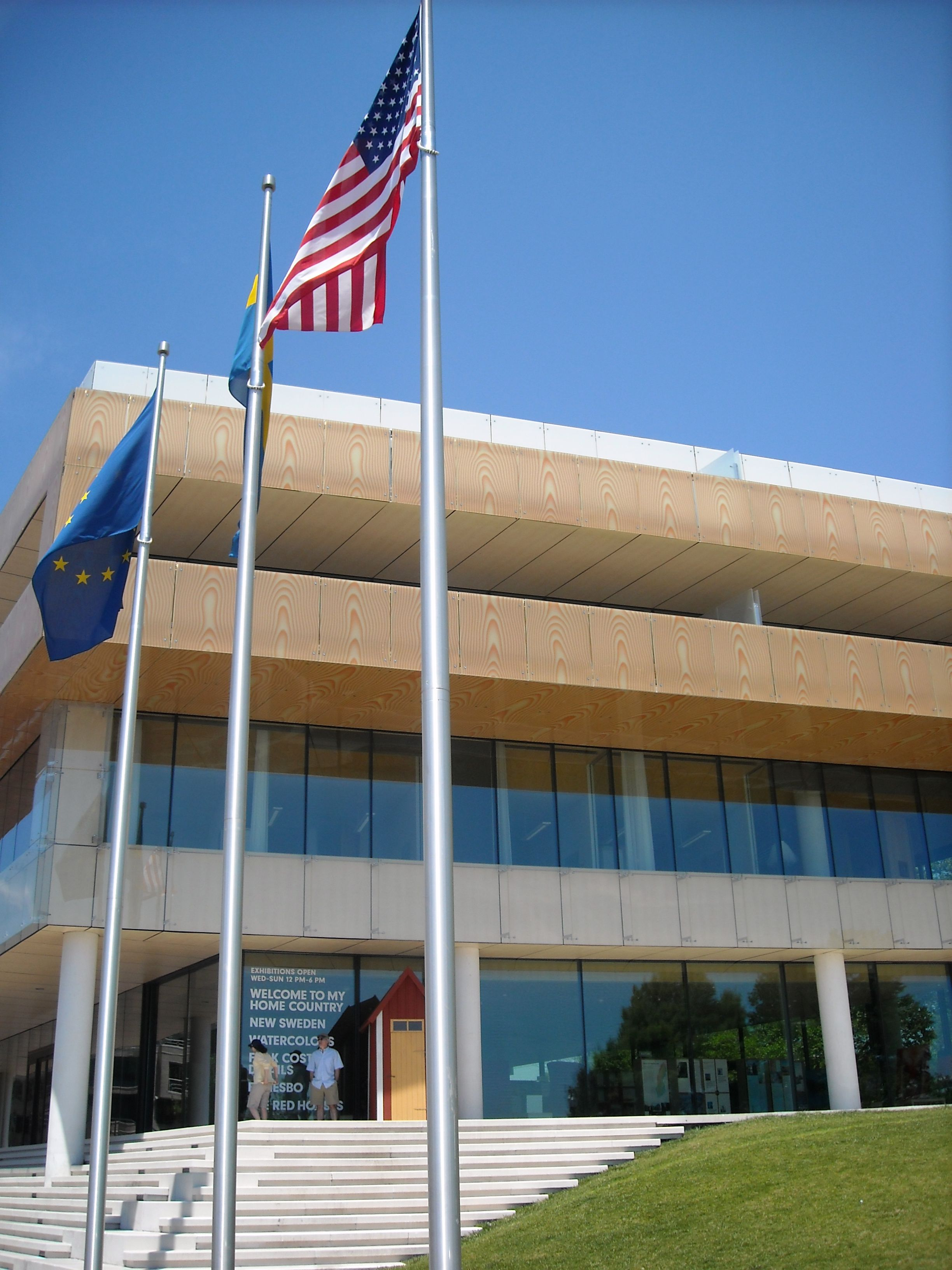
Exterior

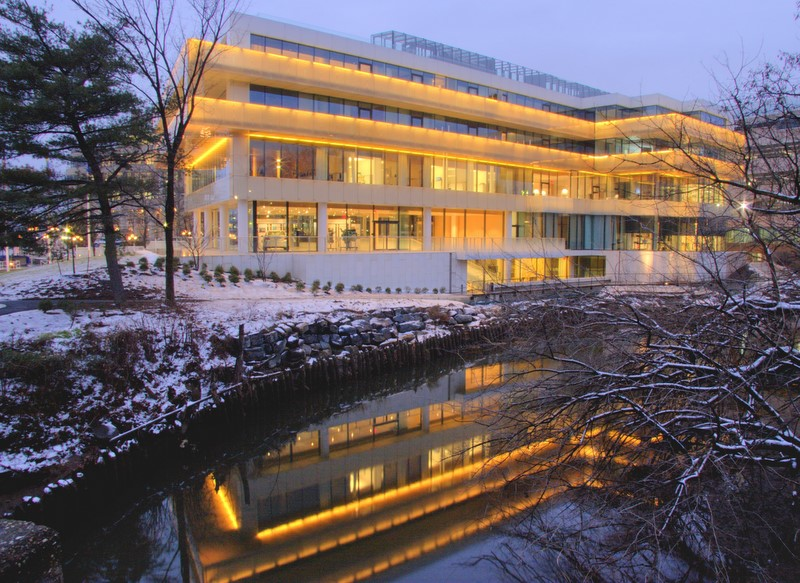
Exterior

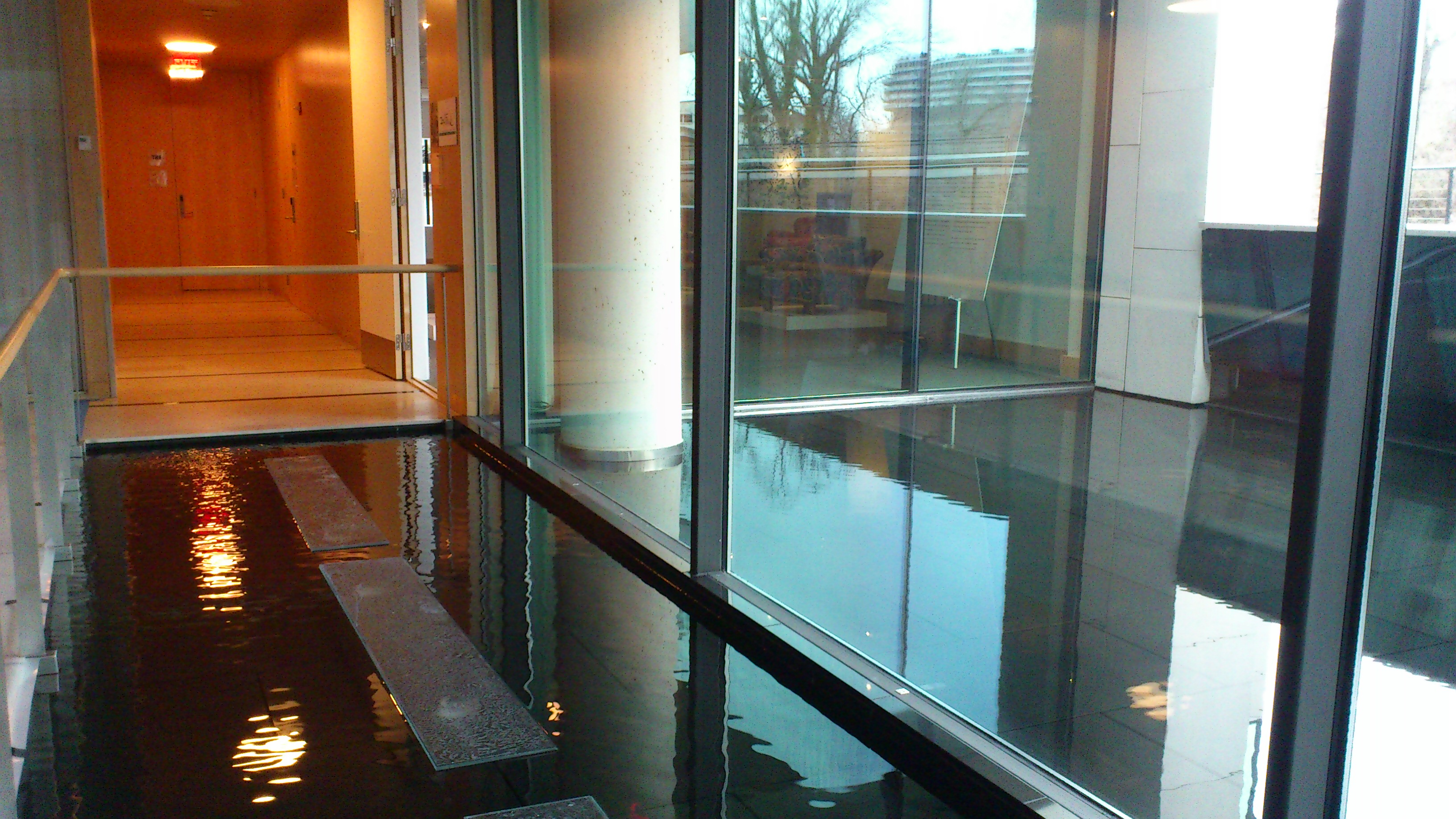
Interior

=== Residence ===
The residence at 3900 Nebraska Avenue was acquired by Ambassador Erik Boheman with his own money in 1950, and after interior work overseen by Mrs Boheman, the transfer took place in early May. As soon as the transfer was complete, renovations on the old residence on R Street began. The Spanish-influenced residence on Nebraska Avenue was designed by American architect Arthur B. Heaton. For several years, the building housed David F. Lawrence, one of the Washington's more well-known newspaper publishers. The residence was decorated with Swedish classics, including rugs by Märta Måås-Fjetterström, Gustavian furniture, art by Stellan Mörner, Olle Bærtling and Fredrik Reuterswärd. The gallery has French woven wallpapers from the late 1600s and early 1700s with landscape motifs. The residence featured a garden, greenhouse, and tennis court. There, former Ambassador Wilhelm Wachtmeister used to play tennis with President George H. W. Bush.

On the night between February 20-21, 1973, eleven paintings, including works by Anders Zorn and Hugo Zuhr, were stolen during a break-in at the residence on Nebraska Avenue. Ambassador Hubert de Bèsche had moved out during a restoration. The thieves had lifted a newly glazed window to gain entry to the house. The theft was discovered the next morning by an architect involved in the restoration of the residence. The stolen paintings included, among others: Anders Zorn's "Braskulla," Hugo Zuhr's "Nämforsen," Adolf Ulrik Wertmüller's "Amor as Bacchus," Frans Timén's "Vårvinter," Gunnar Svenson's "Norrländskt landskap," Bertil Landelius's "Röda lador," an unknown artist's portrait of Adolf Frederick, and a large painting of Charles XII.

In June 2019, a decision was taken to sell the residence and that the Swedish ambassador would move into House of Sweden.

Residence of the Ambassador of Sweden in Washington, D.C

Residence of the Ambassador of Sweden in Washington, D.C

Detail of the doorway to the residence of the Ambassador of Sweden in Washington, D.C

== See also ==
- Sweden–United States relations
