= Rya =

Rya or RYA may refer to:

== Biology ==
- Rya sheep, breed of sheep native to Sweden
- Rya, a genus in subfamily Blennocampinae

== People ==
- Rya Kihlstedt (born 1970), American actress
- Rya W. Zobel (born 1931), judge of the United States District Court for the District of Massachusetts

== Places ==
- Rya, Sweden
- Rya Forest, Sweden
- Rya Formation, Sweden
- Rya Tunnel, a subsea road tunnel in Tromsø Municipality, Troms, Norway

== Other uses ==
- Rya (rug), type of woolen rug
- Royal Yachting Association, a United Kingdom national body for sailing
- Ryijy ('rya' in Swedish), a woven Finnish long-tufted tapestry or knotted-pile carpet hanging
- Ryanair (Euronext Dublin ticker symbol RYA)
