= Scandinavian rugs =

Scandinavian textile crafts

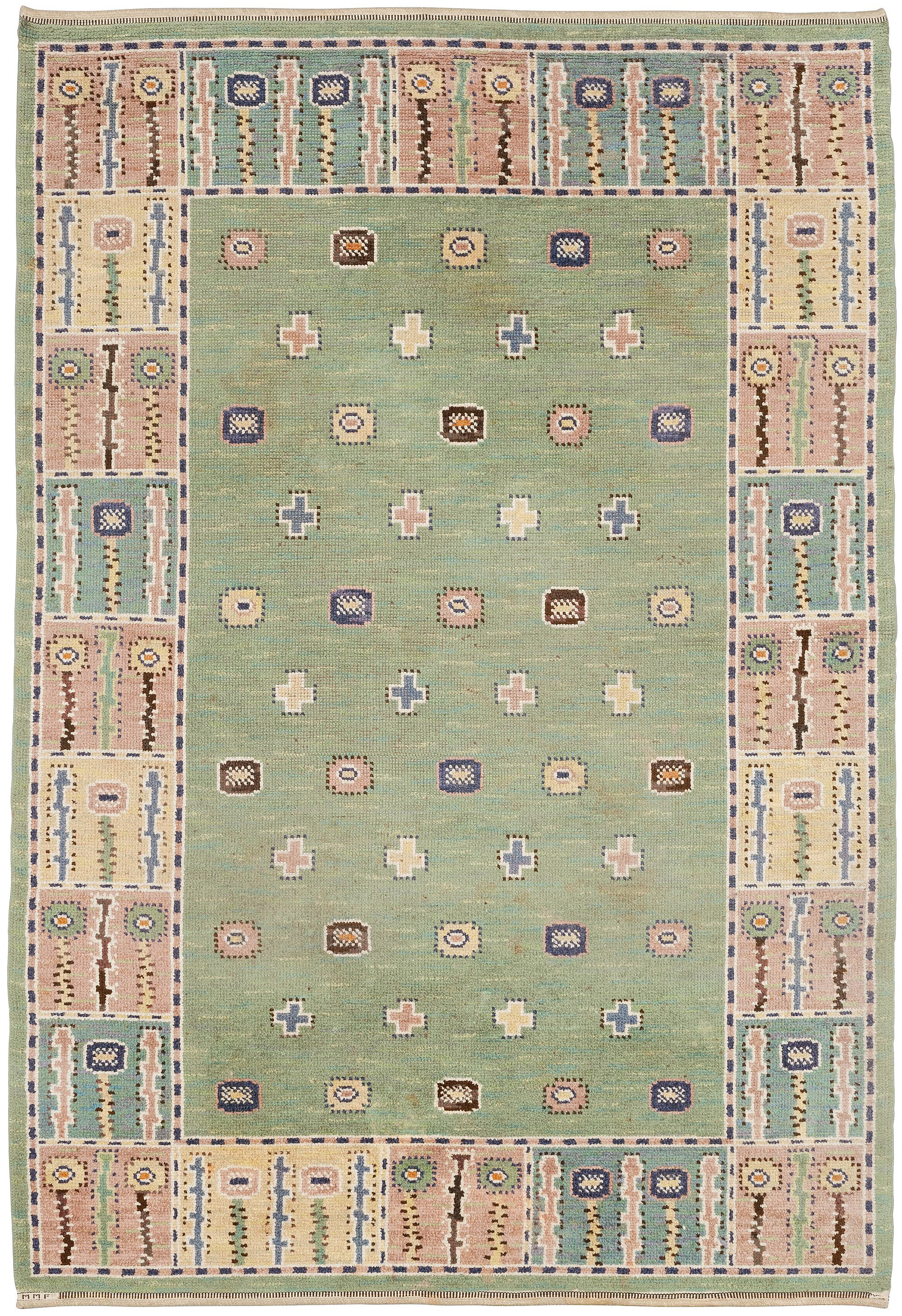
An antique Swedish carpet from the Doris Leslie Blau Collection

Scandinavian rugs are a handmade textile tradition by craftspeople of the Scandinavian countries of Denmark, Finland, Norway, and Sweden, where rugs have been woven for centuries for household and ceremonial use. Twentieth-century Swedish rugs, including those designed by Märta Måås-Fjetterström, are collected internationally.

== History ==
=== Influence ===
Rug-making in Scandinavia developed as part of the craft's spread into Europe from the East. Like other European weavers, Scandinavian rug-makers adopted designs and techniques from Anatolia (Asia Minor), with which early medieval Scandinavians had contact through long-distance trade. By the tenth century, Scandinavians were trading extensively with the Byzantine Empire in Constantinople, which created demand for imported rugs.

During the Viking Age in the late 8th to the mid-11th centuries, luxury textiles reached Scandinavia from Byzantium and Persia. Notably, silks began to be often spliced into strips to trim clothing. The oldest surviving carpet, colloquially known as the Marby carpet, thought to be knotted in Anatolia between 1300 and 1420 and is kept and showcased at the Marby Church in Sweden.

=== Development of rya ===
By the fifteenth century, Scandinavians were using the rya (Finnish: ryijy), a long-piled knotted rug.} Unlike the imported rugs, ryas had a thick, shaggy pile suited to cold winters. They became common in medieval Scandinavia, where they were used as bedcovers and in place of cloaks and blankets. Examples of this type of textile have been found at excavations of Viking Age settlements, notably in York.

Ryas were also used in wedding ceremonies. Wedding ryas often feature the initials of the bride and the groom, the date of the wedding ceremony, a set of double hearts, and symbols representing the two families.

Between the sixteenth and nineteenth centuries, Scandinavian weavers incorporated Oriental motifs, most prominently the Tree of Life, which is common in Persian rugs and was adapted to represent family lineage.

By the 1880s, ryas were popular throughout northern Europe. Sweden also produced the röllakan, a flat-woven tapestry rug that differed from the thick-piled rya in construction but served similar purposes.

Ryas later fell out of favor with the Scandinavian nobility and became a folk art, but they regained popularity in the mid-twentieth century.

Their abstract, geometric patterns and deep pile appealed to modernist designers in Europe and North America, who used them to soften interiors dominated by straight lines, hard wood and metal.

== Rug making techniques ==
Rya rugs are woven with a combination of techniques that include weaving tapestry, needlework, and carpet knots. Traditional ryas are hand-knotted with symmetric Turkish (Ghiordes) knots tied around pairs of warp threads, with several rows of plain weave between each row of knots, which produces the long, widely spaced pile.

Early ryas were used with the pile facing the body for warmth, so decoration was placed on the flat-woven side and the pile was often a single color. Later ryas were made to be displayed pile-side up, with patterned, multicolored pile.

The Swedish textile artist Märta Måås-Fjetterström ran a weaving workshop in Båstad from 1919 until her death in 1941. Her rugs drew on natural motifs rendered in simplified lines and geometric forms.

== Modern design ==
At her death in 1941, Måås-Fjetterström left more than 700 rug designs with weaving instructions.

Her workshop continued after her death, weaving her designs and those of later artists including Ann-Mari Forsberg, Barbro Nilsson and Marianne Richter.

Mid-twentieth-century designers and decorators used Scandinavian rugs, including Måås-Fjetterström's, in modernist interiors.

== See also ==
- List of Scandinavian textile artists
