= Marianne Richter =

Swedish textile artist

Marianne Elisabet Richter Lindroth (1916–2010) was a Swedish textile artist who, from 1942, was engaged as a designer at Märta Måås-Fjetterström's workshop. There she produced flatweaves, pile rugs, and tapestries. She is remembered in particular for her rya rugs and her large wall hangings. Her patterns have since become classics in Swedish textile arts.

== Biography ==
Born on 25 August 1916 in Helsingborg, Marianne Elisabet Richter was the daughter of the merchant Carl Emil Leonard Richter (1880–1974) and his wife Sonja Elisabeth née Baagöe (1892–1985). She was the second of seven children. Her daughter, Sara Marianne, born in 1949, also became a textile artist.

After training as a textile artist at the Technical School in Stockholm and an apprenticeship in Märta Måås-Fjetterström's workshop in Båstad, her first job was with the handicraft association Svensk Hemslöjd in Växjö. In 1942, Barbro Nilsson invited her to work as a designer in the Båstad workshop, where her first creation was Forsythia, a rug made using the flossa technique. She produced designs for rugs and other textiles there until the mid-1970s. In 1955, at the Helsingborg exhibition, she presented her large tapestry Båtar, depicting sailing ships.

One of her most significant works is the tapestry commissioned by the Swedish government for a conference room at the United Nations Headquarters in New York. Measuring 200 square metres, when it was hung in 1951, it was said to be the world's largest tapestry. Other notable works included tapestries for Swedish embassies, her Strandvägsskutor for Handelsbanken depicting tall-master ships, and Korn och humle (Corn and Hops) for the Swedish brewers' association.

In 1974, she married Carl Hildebrand Lindroth, an entomology professor at Lund University who died in 1979. Marianne Elisabet Lindroth died on 24 November 2010 in Mölle and is buried at Brunnby cemetery.
