= Maria Andersson =

Maria Andersson or Anderson may refer to:

== Sports ==
- Maria Andersson (athlete) from 1982 IAAF World Cross Country Championships – Senior women's race
- Maria Andersson (co-driver) in 2007 World Rally Championship season
- Maria Andersson (footballer) from Dalsjöfors GoIF

== Others ==
- Maria Andersson (industrialist) (1837–1922), Swedish textile industrialist
- Maria Andersson (singer) (born 1981), musician in Sahara Hotnights
- Maria Anderson (ballet dancer) in Cinderella (Fitinhof-Schell) etc.
- Maria Anderson, Daughter of the Regiment (1791–1881), also known as Maria Hill

== See also ==
- Mari Andersson (born 1986), Swedish tennis player
