= Kirsti Ilvessalo =

Finnish textile artist (1920–2019)

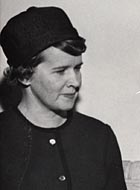
Kirsti-Ilvessalo, 1959

Kirsti Ilvessalo (after marriage, Kirsti Ilvessalo-Viljakainen; 25 May 1920 – 5 July 2019) was a Finnish textile artist, best known for her ryijy. She received awards at the Triennale di Milano (1951, 1954, 1960), and the Order of the Lion of Finland (1979).

== Biography ==
Kirsti Päivi Ilvessalo was born in Helsinki on 25 May 1920. She received her education at the Aalto University School of Arts, Design and Architecture 1940–1944.

Ilvessalo was a leader in the Friends of Finnish Handicraft association during the period of 1947 to 1952. Subsequently, she opened her own textile studio. She taught textile composition at the School of Art and Design in 1947–1960. She was best known for her ryijy, which appeared in several foreign museums (including the Victoria and Albert Museum in London and the Nationalmuseum in Stockholm). She also composed and manufactured interior textiles for a number of public buildings. She also designed jewelry and wallpaper.

Ilvessalo won the gold medal at the Triennale di Milano in 1951 and 1960 as well as the Grand Prix in 1954. In 1979, she was awarded the Order of the Lion of Finland. She died on 5 July 2019.

== Awards ==
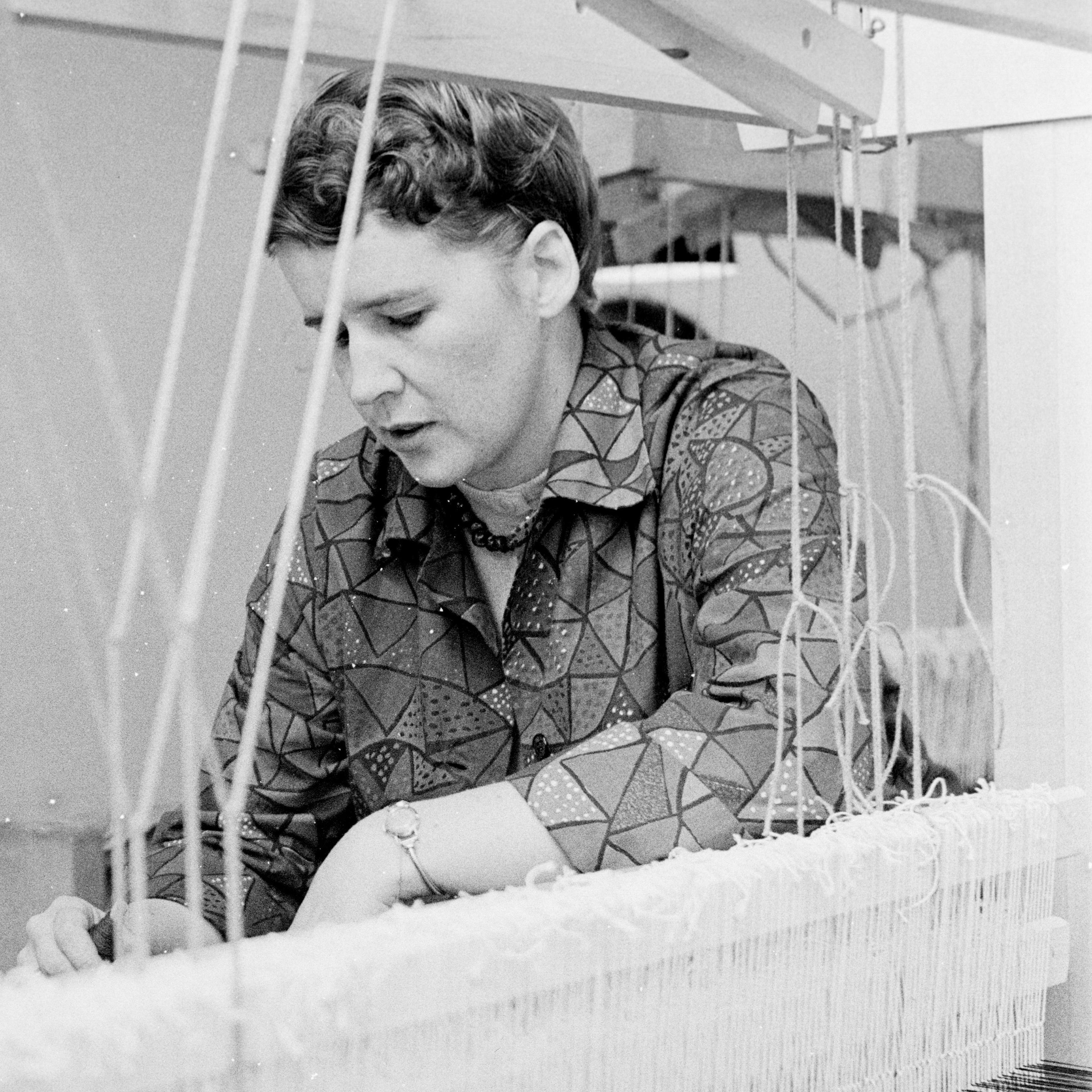
Kirsti Ilvessalo, 1956

- 1951, Gold Medal, Triennale di Milano
- 1954, Grand Prix, Triennale di Milano
- 1960, Gold Medal, Triennale di Milano
- 1979, Order of the Lion of Finland
