= Maria Andersson (industrialist) =

Swedish textile industrialist and philanthropist

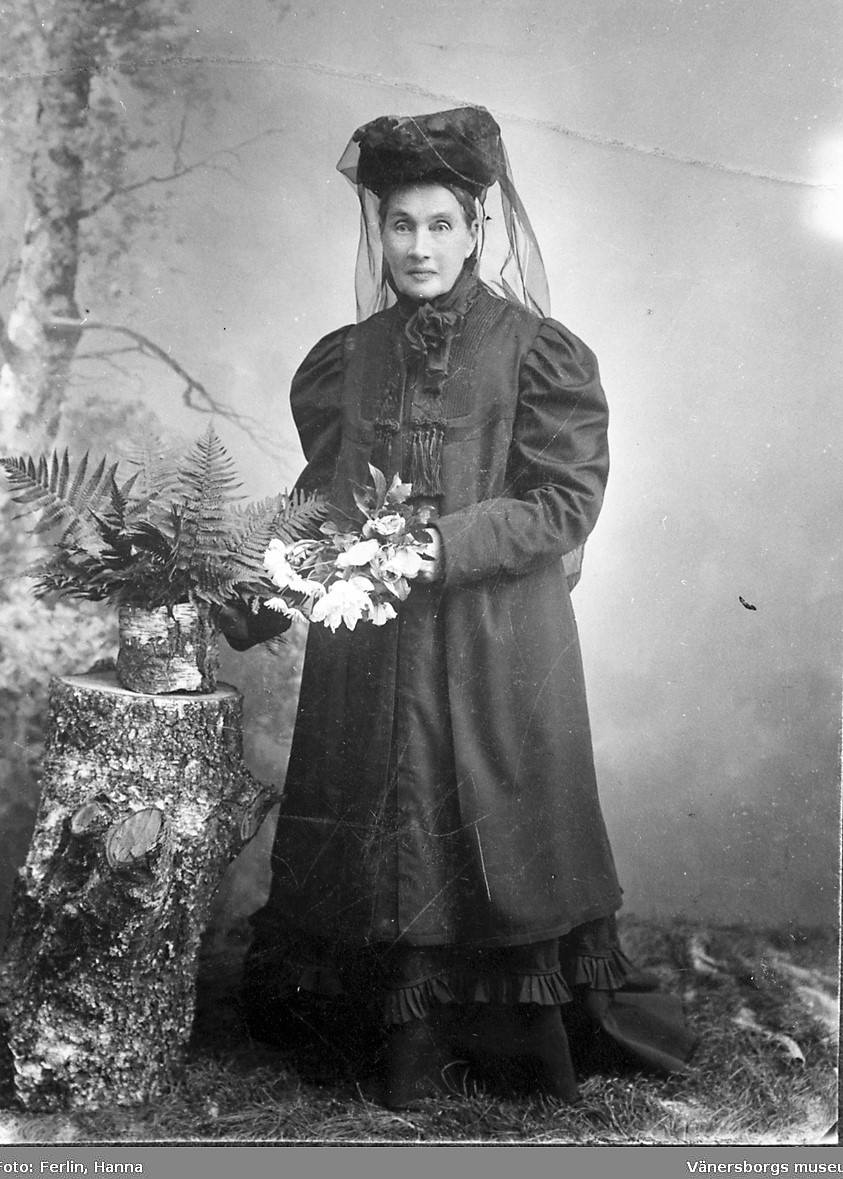
A photo of Maria Andersson taken in 1906. She holds some flowers next to a cut down tree.

Maria Andersson (1837–1922) was a Swedish textile industrialist and philanthropist.

She was the daughter of the rich farmer and parliamentarian Johannes Jansson i Ellenö. In 1857, she married the rich farmer and parliamentarian Magnus Andersson i Stigen, and settled in his estate in Stigen in Dalsland.

In 1859, the poverty among the peasantry inspired her to found a textile enterprise in the form of a putting-out system, which could give poor women of the peasantry a way of earning money. The Swedish famine of 1867–1869 and the great need for work caused her enterprise to expand from philanthropy to a major business: she also managed her own weaving school in connection to this: one of her employees and students being the later famous Johanna Brunsson. In 1874, the business was formally transformed into a firm: because she was a married woman and therefore under the guardianship of her husband, the firm was named after him, although the business was under her personal management. She managed the firm until 1890 when she retired and gave the management over to her sons.

In 1891, she founded a private mental hospital, where the principle was to allow the patients to be active in light work for a meaningful life rather than just to have them locked up, which was at that time common, and she expanded it to include a series of hospitals.

While her spouse was conservative, she was a liberal and engaged in the National Association for Women's Suffrage (Sweden) and the Temperance movement.
