= Elsa Gullberg =

Swedish interior architect and textile designer (1886–1984)

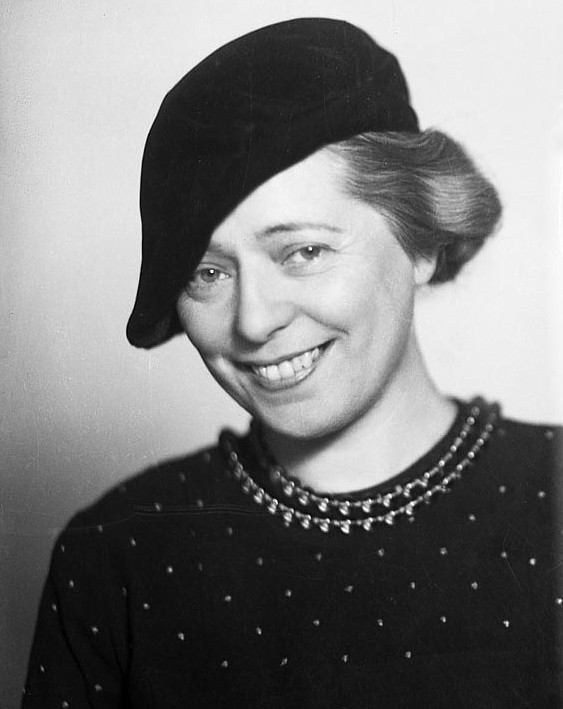
Elsa Gullberg

Elsa Gullberg (14 March 1886 – 1 March 1984) was a Swedish interior architect and textile designer. She was a pioneer of modern textile design in Sweden and played an instrumental role in transforming the textile industry. She was one of the renowned Swedish textile designers including Erik Wettergren, Carl Bergsten and Gregor Paulsson, who worked to modernize textile industries in Sweden.

== Biography ==
Elsa Gullberg was born on 14 March 1886 in Malmö, Sweden. She studied textile crafts at the Art and Design School in Stockholm. After completing her studies, she started her career as an assistant to Lilli Zickerman, an influential figure in textile design, at the Association for Swedish Homework.

She was part of a group of reformers who wanted to modernize the production process of Swedish textile industries. She visited a number of textile firms in different countries to incorporate new ideas in the Swedish textile sector. She was highly influenced by the designing and production process undertaken at the Deutscher Werkbund and Dresdner Werkstätte in Germany, and the Wiener Werkstätte in Austria.

The Swedish Society of Crafts and Design was reorganized in 1915. The educational practices related to arts and crafts were redesigned in line with modernizing Swedish textile industries.

In 1927, she started Sweden’s first modern interior design firm Elsa Gullberg Textil og Inredningar AB, which focused on tradition-based styles.

At the World’s Fair in New York, one of her famous designs, Lilies, was exhibited in 1939.

She died on 1 March 1984 in Vaxholm, in Stockholm County, Sweden.
