= Lilli Zickerman =

Swedish textile artist

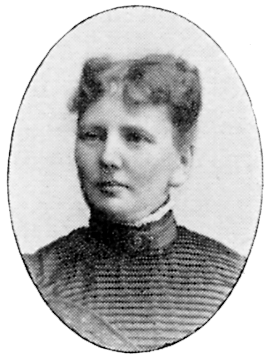
Zickerman in 1901

Emma Carolina Helena "Lilli" Zickerman (29 May 1858 – 5 September 1949) was a Swedish textile artist who pioneered the Swedish Handicraft Association (Föreningen för svensk hemslöjd) in 1899. In 1914, she embarked on the creation of an inventory of popular textile art in Sweden, documenting some 24,000 items with photographs and samples of threads by 1932.

== Biography ==
Born on 29 May 1858 in Skövde, Västergötland, Emma Carolina Helena Zickerman was the daughter of the pharmacist Carl Peter Zickerman and his wife Hedvig Amalia née Malmgren. She was raised in Skövde together with her three brothers. After studying sewing and weaving at the school run by the Friends of Handicraft in Stockholm, she returned to Skövde in 1886 where she taught textile arts and, collaborating with Agnes Behmer, opened an embroidery shop selling their works and patterns. The following year she studied at the South Kensington Museum and went on to exhibit at the 1897 Stockholm Exposition, receiving a silver medal.

Inspired by the rural textiles displayed at the Nordic Museum, in 1899 she established the Swedish Handicraft Association (Föreningen för svensk hemslöjd), with a board chaired by Prince Eugen and including the artist Ottilia Adelborg, the women's rights activist Elisabeth Tamm and other prominent Swedes. Zickerman ran the association's shop, obtaining items from those who had participated in the Stockholm Exposition. The organization gradually expanded, offering attractive, high-quality aesthetic works based on traditional techniques such as upholstery, curtains and rugs. A network of outlets was created throughout Sweden.

In 1908, Zickerman moved to Vittsjö in Scandia where she built the Sommargården residence, complete with a weaving school (1912). The weaving school was headed by Elsa Gullberg and later by Märta Måås-Fjetterström.

From 1914 to 1931, Zickerman devoted her efforts to creating a comprehensive inventory of popular textile art in Sweden. Working in the field, she catalogued 24,000 items complete with black and white photographs and samples of thread to indicate colour and texture. She had hoped to publish the results in 27 volumes but the only part to appear was a preliminary section on röllaken weaving, published in 1937.

After returning to Skövdre in 1946, Lilli Zickerman died on 5 September 1949. She is buried in St Sigfrid's Cemetery.
