= Rya sheep =

Breed of sheep

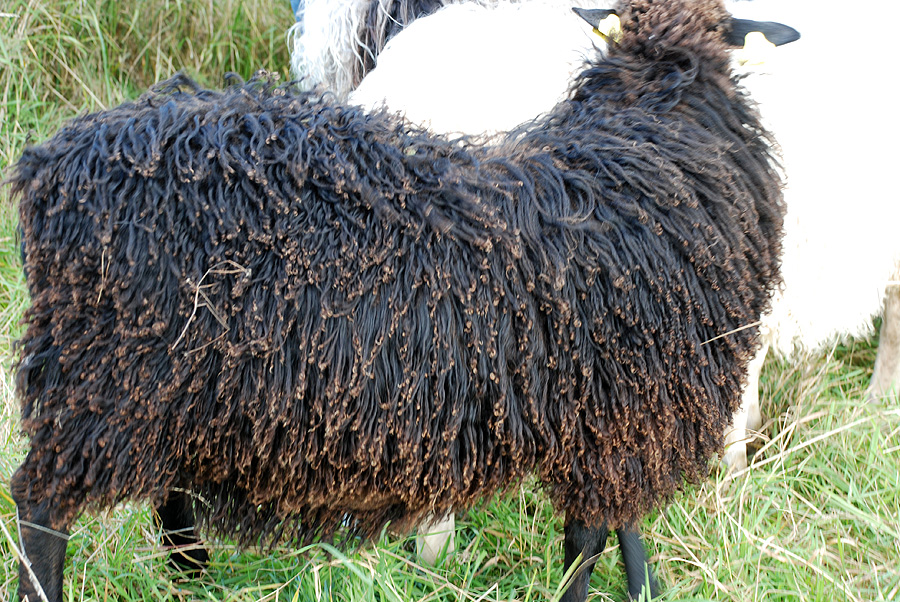
Rya sheep

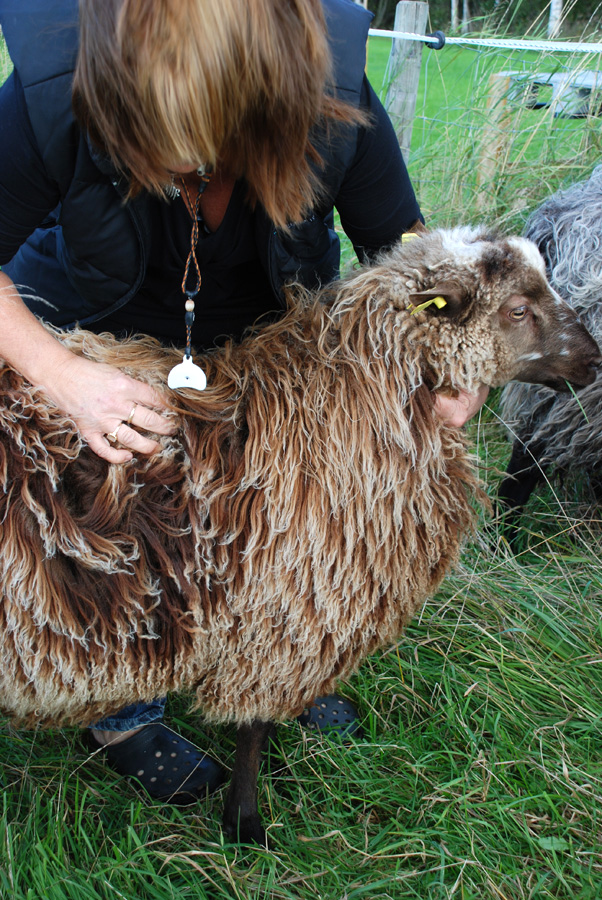
Rya sheep

Rya, also known as Ryafår or Swedish Carpet Wool Sheep, is a breed of sheep that is native to Sweden. The breed originated from the Swedish and Norwegian landrace breeds. This double-coated breed of Swedish Landrace origin also contains some Norwegian Spælsau heritage. The purpose of the sheep was to use the long, wavy, and shiny wool to produce rya-wool, which is often used to make carpets. In the early twentieth century, few long wool sheep remained in the province of Dalarna, leading to the restoration of the rya sheep breed. In 2000, there was a stable population of about two thousand rya sheep. They can be found in northern and central Sweden. Most of herds are located in Dalarna. They are usually kept in small flocks.

At the start of the 20th century, Dalarna had a population of sheep with long wool, which was popular in the area for decorating national costumes. In 1915, breeding was done to obtain sheep that produced this "rya-wool".

The rya sheep is a medium-sized sheep with relatively short legs, and has strong and shiny long wool fibers. The legs, tail, forehead, cheek, and crown do not have wool. For a three-month-old lamb, the wool can be 6 in (15 cm) long, and for an adult, the wool can be up to 12 in (30 cm) long. Half the fleece should be the hair coat, which should be lustrous with a well-defined, broad crimp. Attaining wool fibers of at least 15 cm in length with a maximum crimp of 3 crimps per 5 cm is the breeding goal. The sheep are white, but there are some grey, black, and brown individuals. The adult wither height is 75 cm for rams and 70 cm for ewes. The live weight is 70 kg for rams and 50 kg for ewes. Both the rams and ewes are polled and have long tails.

The rya sheep is also known to be highly fertile. The mean litter size is 2.1 lambs at birth.

The sheep is also characterized by lambing ease and by their ability to forage in rough terrain.

== See also ==
- Rya
