= Barbro Nilsson =

Swedish textile artist

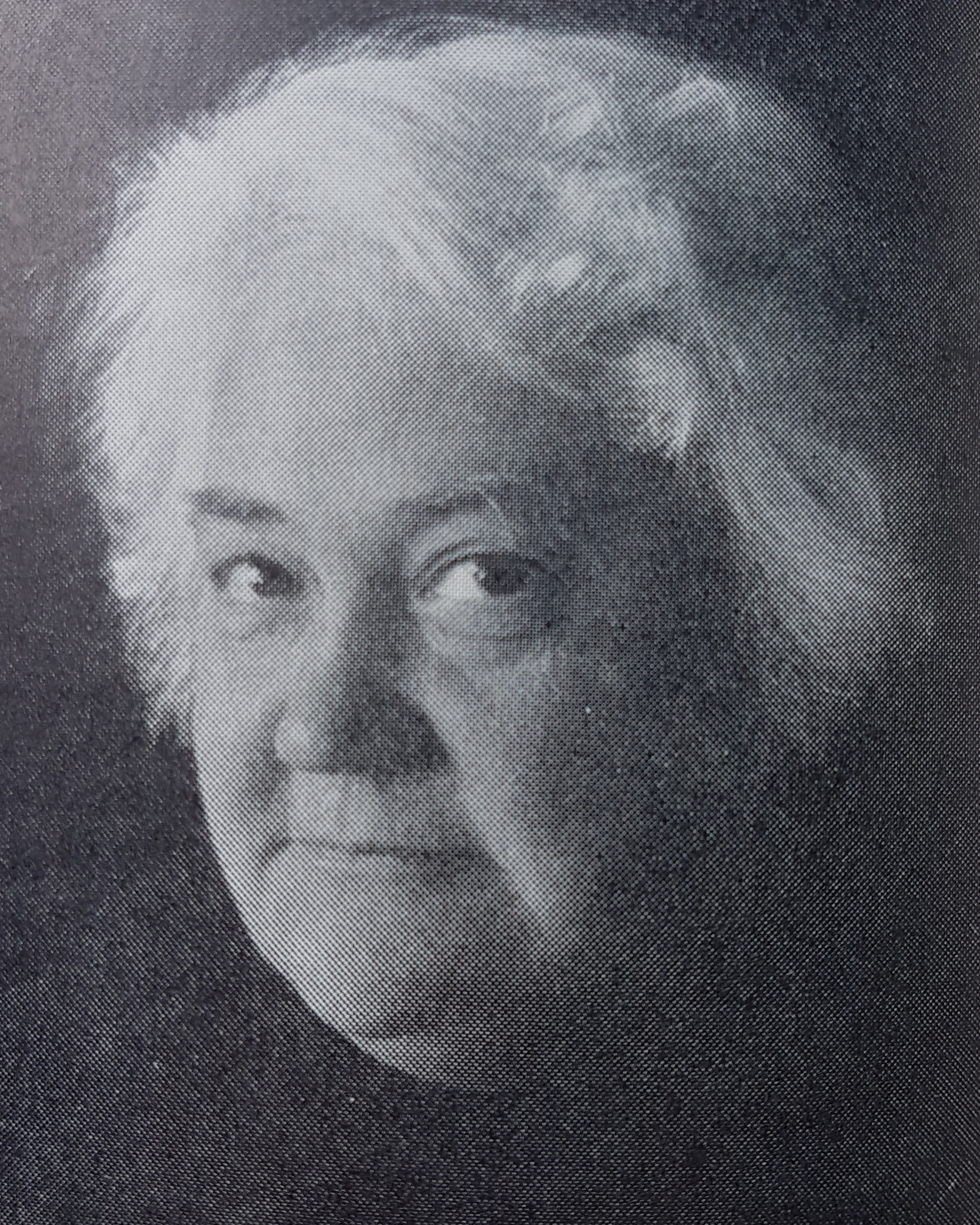
Barbro Nilsson

Barbro Nilsson née Lundberg (1899–1983) was a Swedish textile artist who is remembered in particular for her large tapestries, including the one she produced in collaboration with Sven Erixson for the Gothenburg Concert Hall in 1939. She was active as a teacher at Konstfack and as head of Märta Måås-Fjetterström's weaving establishment in Båstad. Nilsson produced her own rugs and church textiles, many with motives inspired by nature.

== Biography ==
Born on 18 July 1899 in Malmö, Barbro Lundberg was the fourth child of Carl Theodor Ansgarius Lundberg and his wife Emma Lovisa née Bong, an artist. When her father was appointed manager of the Nordiska Kompaniet department store in 1904, the family moved to Stockholm where she was trained in hand weaving at Johanna Brunsson's school from the age of 14. From 1918 to 1920, she remained at the school as a teacher before broadening her competence in weaving at Stockholm's Technical School.

In the 1920s, Barbro Lundberg established a studio on Mäster Samuelsgatan in Stockholm, receiving a series of orders from the Salén clothing company. In 1928, she married the sculptor Rober Nilsson (1894–1980). Thanks to the large travel grant he was awarded, the family spent the next three years in Rome where their son, the photographer Pål Nils Nilsson was born in 1929. Settling in Stockholm, the family spent their summers in Robert Nilsson's native Lerberget near Höganäs.

In 1936, Nilsson was commissioned to produce a large tapestry as part of Sven Erixson's proposal for refurbishing the Gothenburg Concert House. It proved to be so successful with its high-quality weaving and colour scheme that she went on to produce many more to designs for painting-quality tapestries by artists including Bertil Damm, Olle Nyman and Endre Nemes.

In 1942, Nilsson was engaged to manage the Märte Måås-Fjetterström weaving studio in Båstad. She remained there for the next 30 years. Winning acclaim as "the number one Swedish textile artist", Nilsson brought in a number of her former students from the Stockholm Technical School, including Marianne Richter, Ann-Mari Forsberg and Barbro Sprinchorn. In 1943, she created one of her most successful rug designs Snäckorna, the first of a series in which she employed the haute-lisse technique.

Over the years, Nilsson produced decorative textiles for over 40 Swedish churches, including Helsingborg's Gustaf Adolf Church and Stockholm's Kungsholm Church. She produced works for the Swedish embassy in Moscow, the public library in Helsingborg and the Supreme Court of Sweden. Among her finest creations are her seven woven works for Sydsvenska Kraft symbolizing natural forces such as the sun and gushing water. Her works can be seen in the collection of the National Museum of Sweden and in those of museums in Gothenburg, Malmö, Copenhagen and Trondheim.

Barbro Nilsson died on 11 October 1983 in Höganäs Municipality. She is buried in the Brunnby cemetery in Nyhamnsläge.

== Awards ==
In 1948, Nilsson was awarded the prestigious Litteris et Artibus medal for her contributions to culture.
