= Samuel Gustaf Hermelin =

Swedish businessman and diplomat (1744–1820)

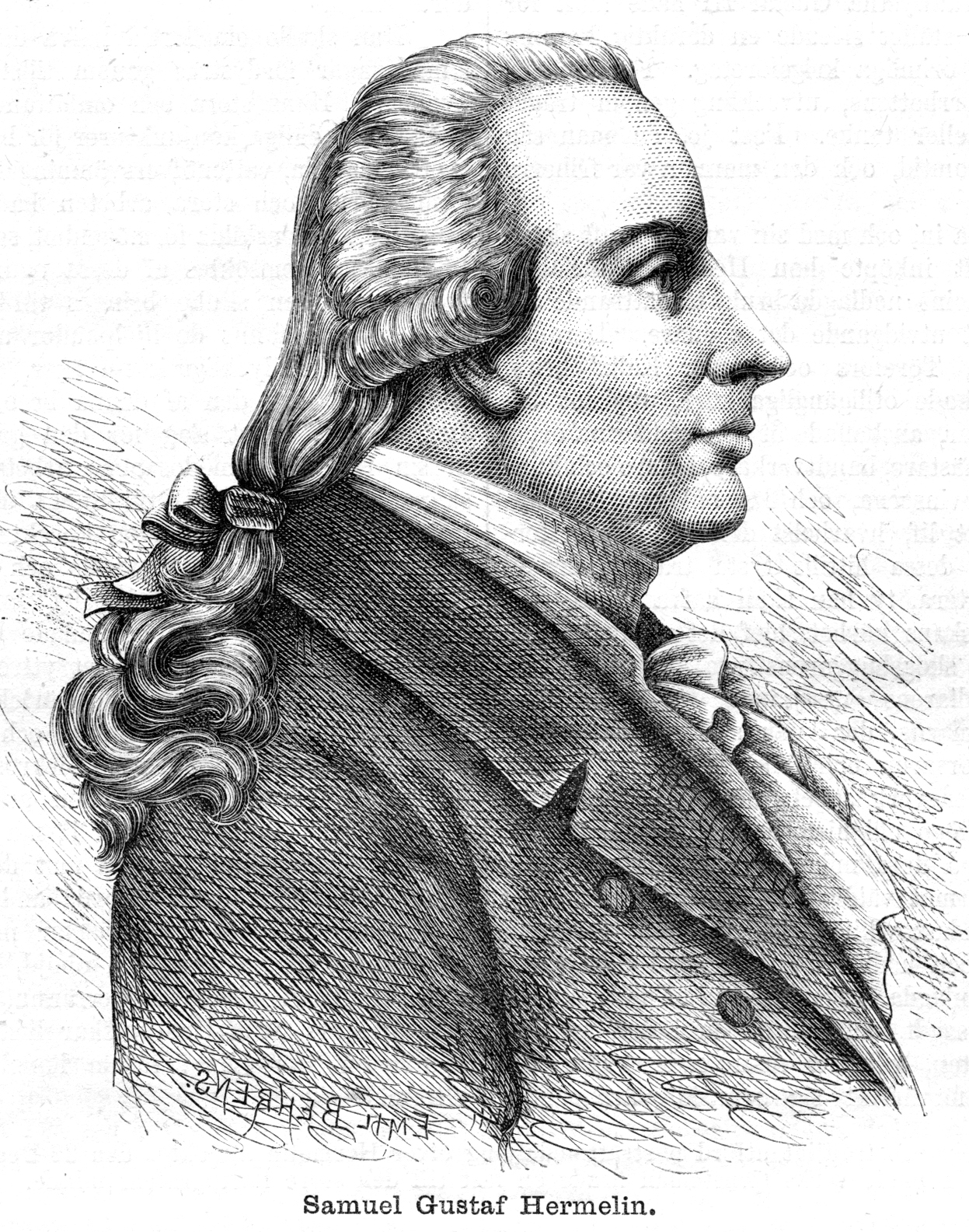
Samuel Gustaf Hermelin, 1877

Samuel Gustaf Hermelin (4 April 1744, Stockholm – 4 March 1820) was a Swedish industrialist, diplomat and cartographer. Samuel Gustaf also belonged to the Swedish nobility. He attended the University of Uppsala for mining. In 1782, he went to the United States to study the mining operations and served as the first Swedish ambassador to the United States. He eventually moved back to Sweden and owned a mining company in Lapland. Samuel Gustaf was elected a Foreign Honorary Member of the American Academy of Arts and Sciences in 1784. In 1785, he was elected an international member of the American Philosophical Society in Philadelphia.
