= Ryijy =

Finnish shaggy knotted-pile hanging

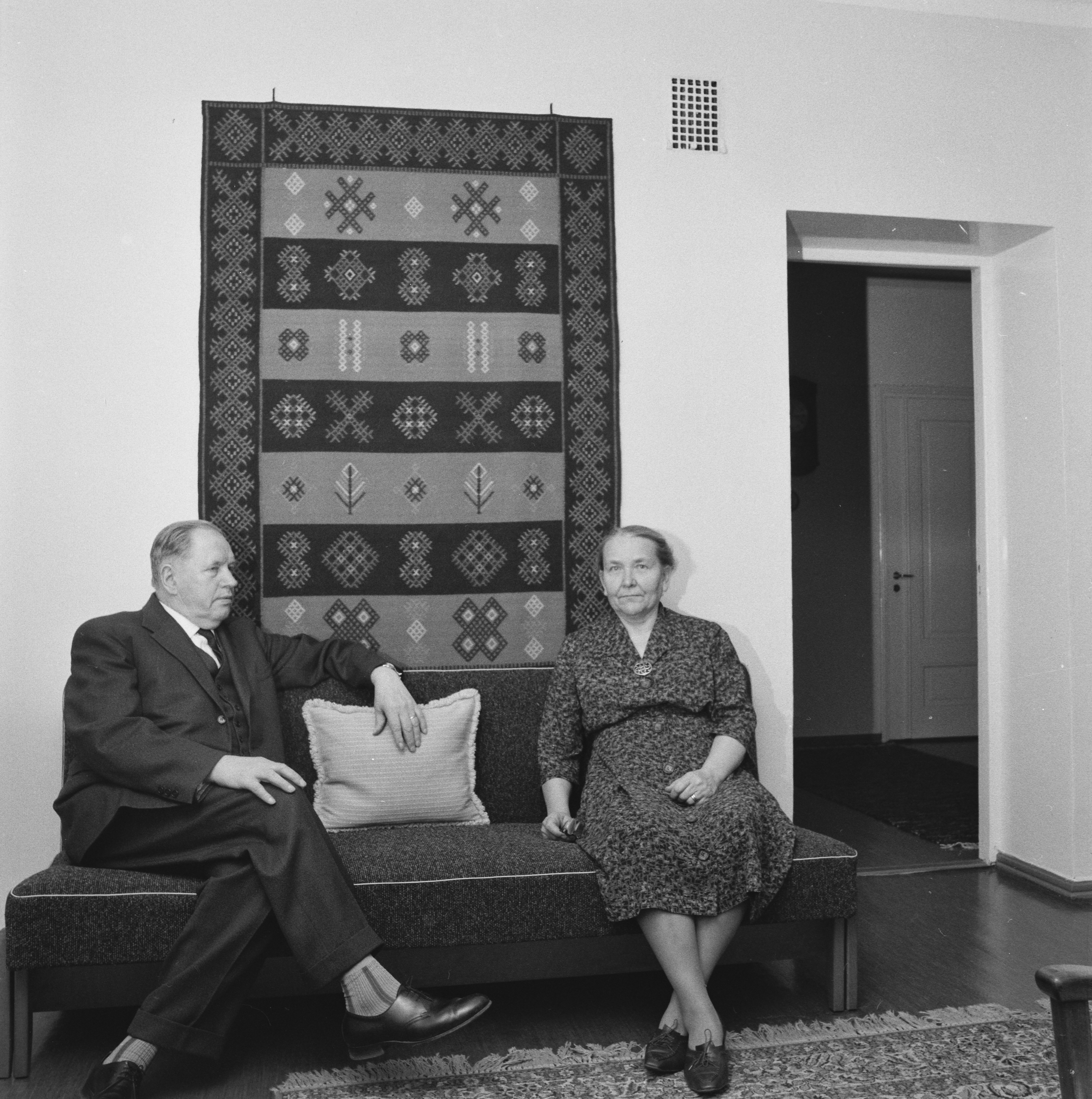
Ryijy from 1960s

Rya (Swedish and Danish), Rye (Norwegian) or Ryijy (Finnish) is an originally entirely hand-made, woven or knotted-pile long-tufted textile with a Nordic origin.

Originally, it served as a blanket and cloak for the Vikings. Later, it was long used as a bedcover, with the pile facing the body. Today, it is one of the best-known products of textile art in Finland and is primarily used as a wall hanging. Its design has adapted to changing aesthetic preferences over time.

Ryas are associated both with folklore and with various artistic styles.

== Origin ==
The Finnish name ryijy originated with the Scandinavian word rya, which means "thick cloth". The decorative ryijy rug is an art form unique to Finland. In the late 19th century, ryijy rug weaving developed as a folk art. Some of the most beautiful tapestries were woven then.

Ryijys date from as early as the 9th century. Similar in nature to a woolen knotted Persian carpet, the ryijy knots are further apart and made much larger and longer. Originally woven for use as coverlets and bedding, they were mainly in natural colors, white, gray, and black. Some tones of yellow, red, green, and blue were introduced with vegetable dyes. Later, aniline dyes added another dimension of color and design.

== Finland ==
The use of color and pattern is especially unique to the Finnish ryijy. Dating back to the 18th century, a ryijy was often used as a prayer rug during wedding ceremonies; the tapestry was then hung for display in the couple's home. Ryijy weavers traveled with their looms throughout the villages and towns, taking commissions to weave a ryijy for special occasions. Different regions had designs specific to the event and colors specific to the local plants for dyes. Designs were often geometric shapes and florals, or figures of humans, animals, or birds. A very typical motif was the Tree of Life signifying family heritage.

Modern ryijys in the 20th century are often works of art designed by textile artists such as Laila Karttunen, Greta Skogster and Kirsti Ilvessalo. But also painters such as Akseli Gallen-Kallela designed ryijys, one of the most famous is Liekki ('Flame'). They are mainly used in homes but also in churches and other public places. Ryijys are available for purchase as both material sets and ready-made. Companies have both traditional and modern designs available. A traditional large size piece costs about 500-700 EUR for the materials and 4000-5000 EUR if ready-made. Second-hand ryijys are also available, often from art and antique auction houses. The popularity of ryijys fluctuates with decades, and trendiness dictates the prices of pre-antique and second-hand modern items. Antique ryijy prices are more stable.

Today ryijy-making techniques include new fibers such as paper cord, available in hundreds of colors, as is the traditional wool. They are designed for a multitude of places and purposes, but each is an individual work of art. Modern designs are often dithered with naturalistic abstract designs, contrasting with the sharp geometry and clearly separated colours of traditional designs.

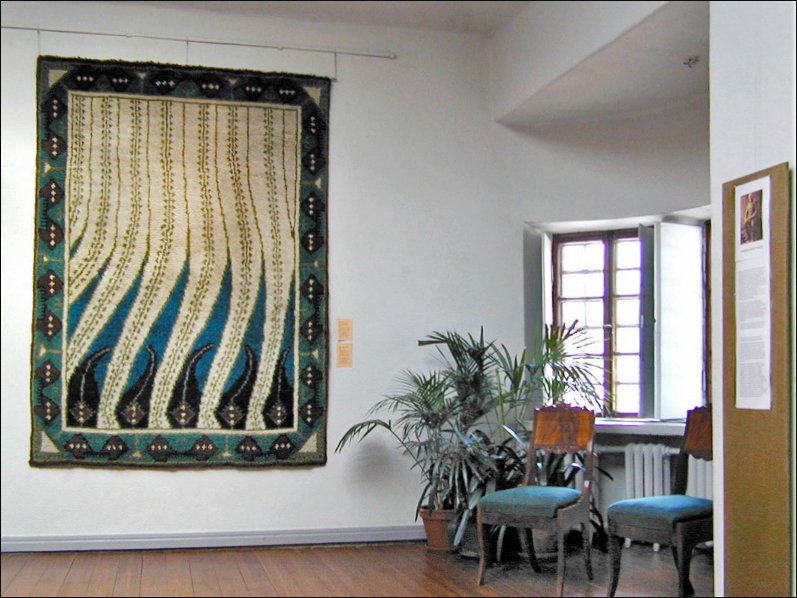
Liekki ('Flame') Ryijy

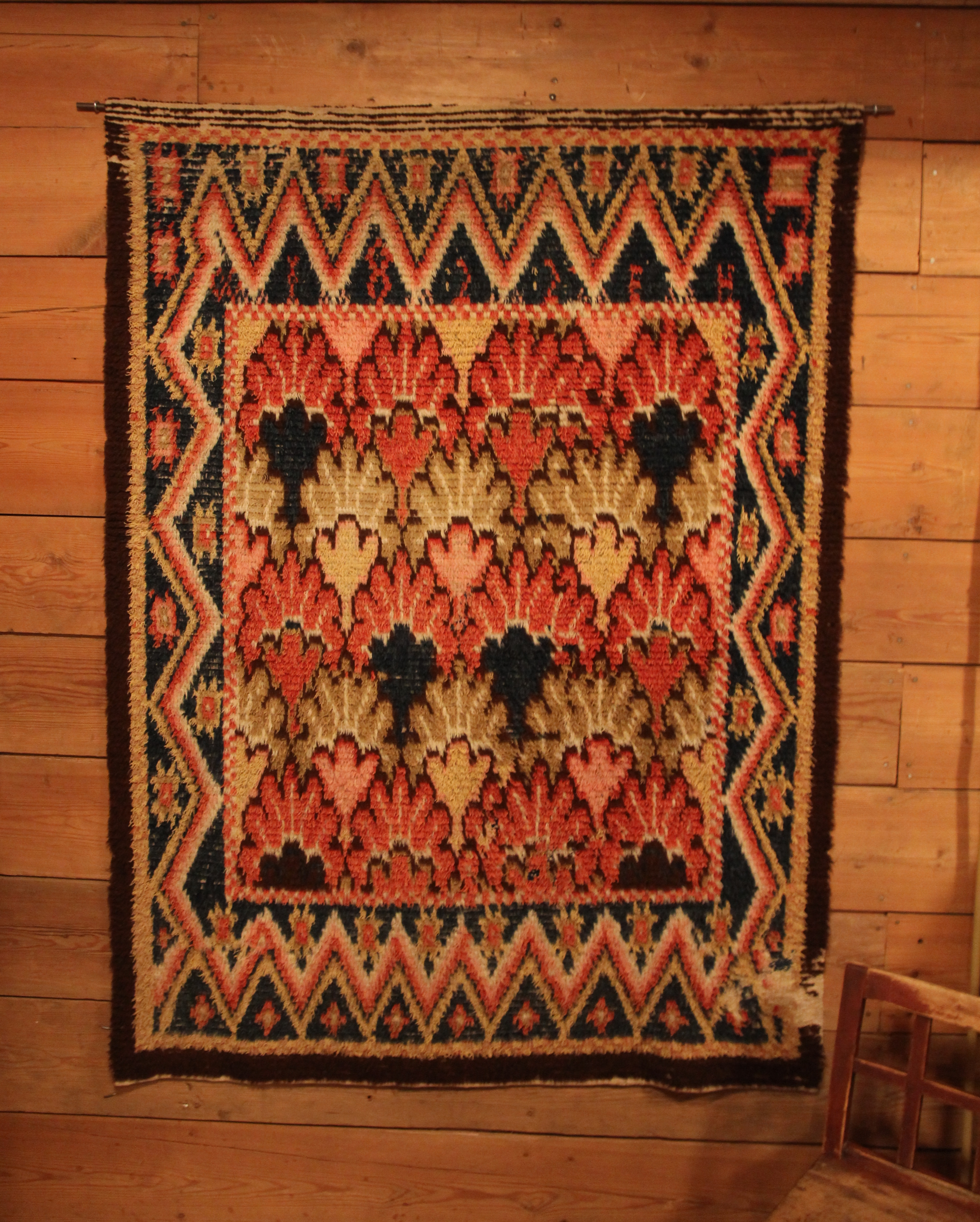
Ryijy displayed at Suur Savo museum.

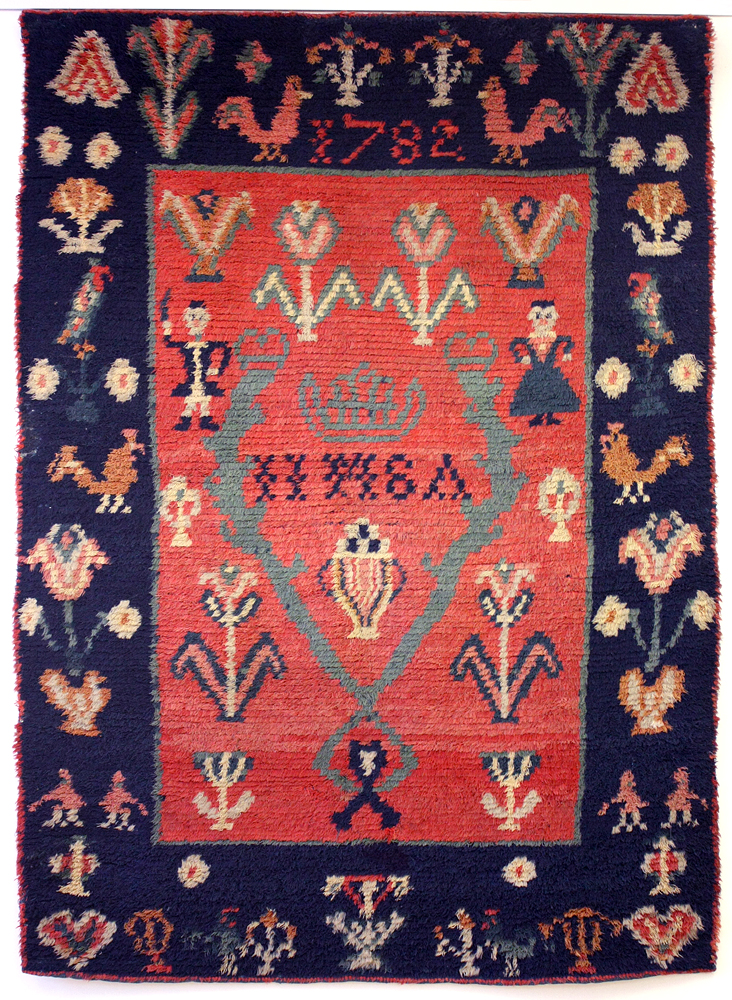
Late 18th century wedding ryijy made of plant-dyed yarn, featuring traditional motifs of husband and wife, plants, and birds.

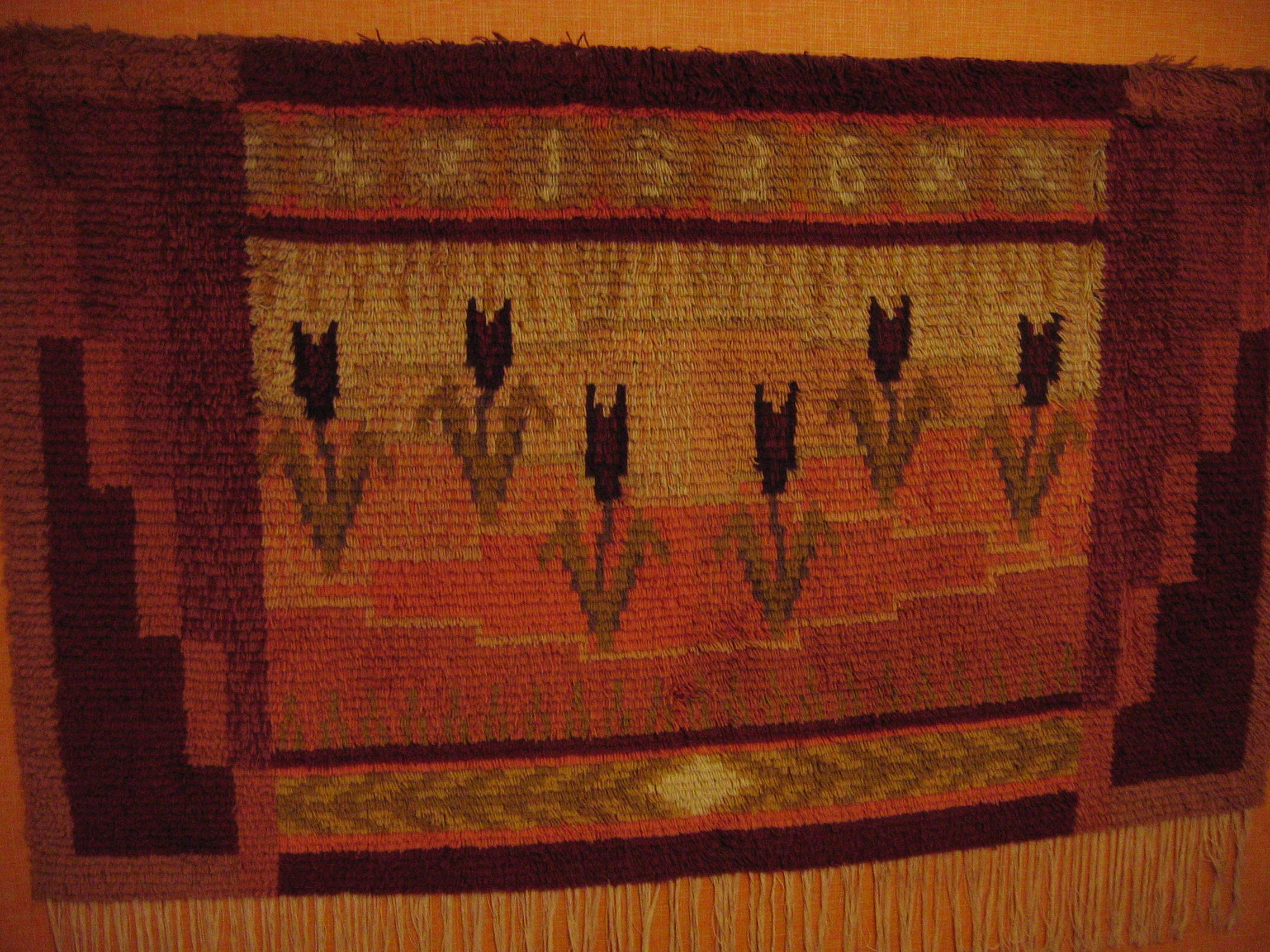
Hand-made ryijy, 1936.

== See also ==
- Rya (rug), Swedish type of rug
