= Märta Måås-Fjetterström =

Swedish textile artist

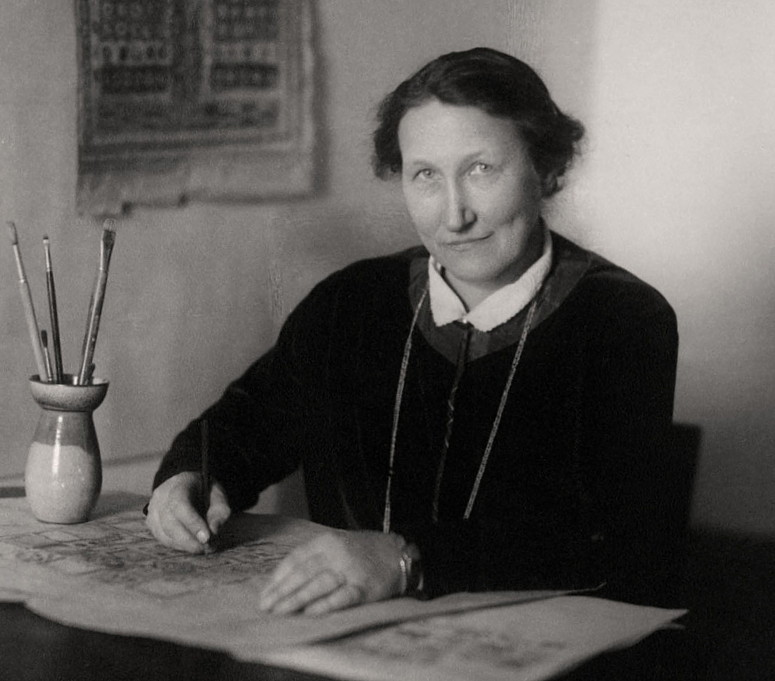
Märta Måås-Fjetterström

Märta Livia Vilhelmina Måås-Fjetterström (21 June 1873 – 13 April 1941) was a leading Swedish textile artist in the early 20th-century. She is remembered in particular for the weaving studio she opened in Båstad in 1919 and for the decorative rugs she produced from the 1910s to the 1930s, increasingly combining rural Nordic traditions with modernist trends. Her works are exhibited in some of the world's most important art museums, including New York's Metropolitan Museum of Art and London's Victoria and Albert Museum.

== Biography ==
Born on 21 June 1873 in Kimstad, Östergötland, Märta Livia Vilhelmina Fjetterström was the daughter of the clergyman Rudolf Fjetterström (1838–1920) and his wife Hedvig Olivia Augusta née Billstén (1849–1932). She was the second of eight children. From 1890 to 1895, she attended the arts and crafts school Högre Konstindustriella Skolan in Stockholm.

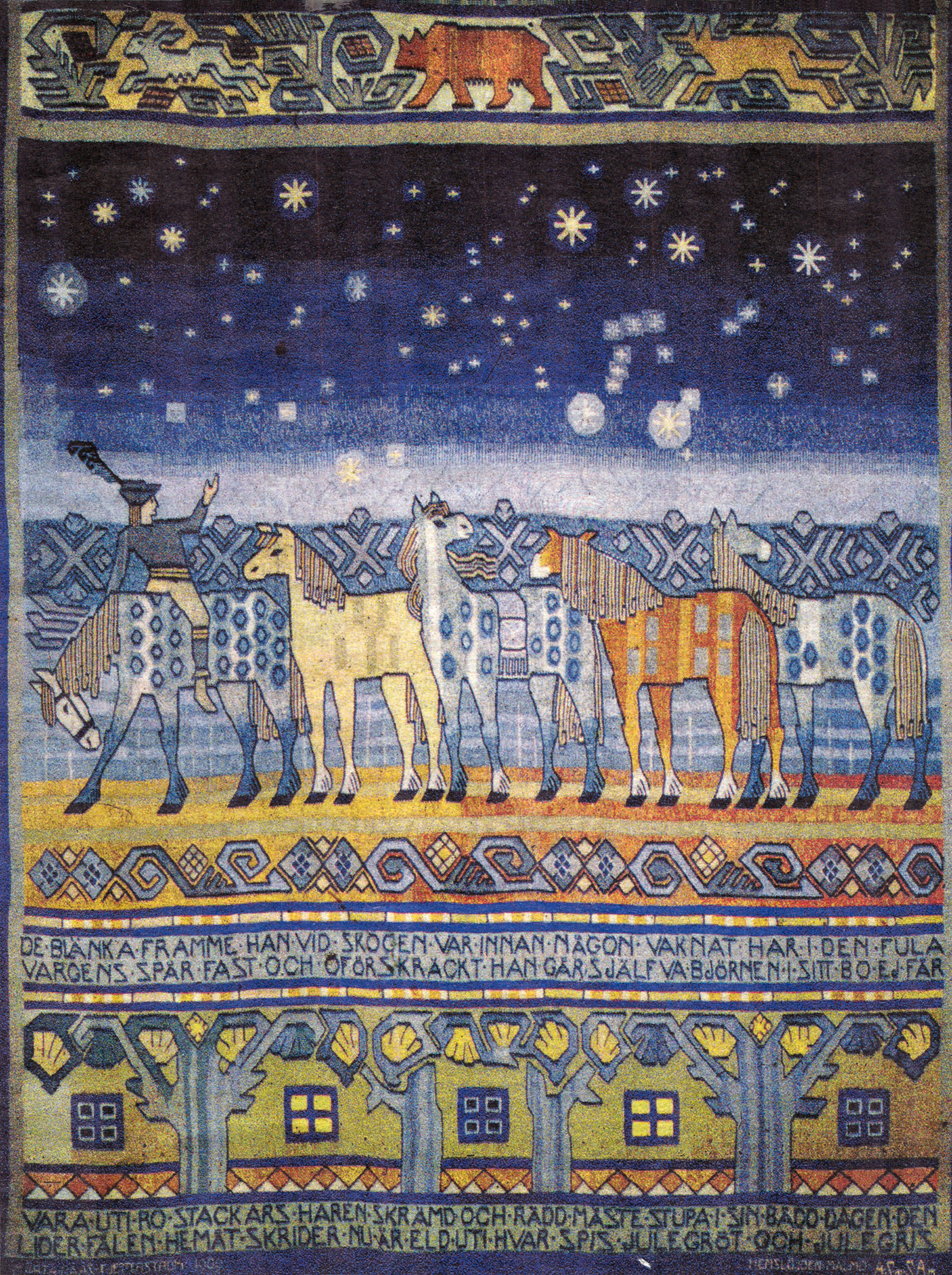
Måås-Fjetterström's tapestry Staffan Stalledräng (1909) based on the legend of St Stephen

On completing her training, she spent a few years teaching at the Technical School in Jönköping but also created decorative woven works which she exhibited in 1900. In 1902, she was invited to work as a weaving instructor at the Kulturhistoriska föreningen in Lund where she showed interest in Scanian textile traditions but experienced difficulty in her dealings with its head, Georg Karlin. While in Lund, she changed her name to Märta Måås-Fjetterström. In 1905, she was invited to head the newly created handicrafts establishment in Malmö known as Malmöhus läns Hemslöjdsförening which encouraged women to develop their interest in arts and crafts. It included a shop where the goods produced could be purchased. She left the Malmö establishment six years later after problems with the board but was re-employed in 1913 by the Hemslöjd weaving school in Vittsjö where she worked with Lilli Zickerman, developing modern designs and pile rugs.

In 1919, Måås-Fjetterström opened her own weaving studio in Båstad which quickly gained a reputation for its pile rugs. There she employed weavers including Barbro Nilsson and Marianne Richter. In the 1930s, she produced classic rugs including Röda trädgårdsmattan, Bruna heden, Hästhagen and Ängarna. Collaborating with the designer Carl Malmsten, textiles were produced for private homes and public spaces such as the Swedish Institute in Rome, Ulriksdal Palace, Övralid Manor and a number of Swedish embassies.

Märta Måås-Fjetterström died on 13 April 1941 in Helsingborg.

== Awards ==
In 1924, Måås-Fjetterström was honoured with the Litteris et Artibus medal for her contributions to culture.
