= Johanna Brunsson =

Swedish weaving arts instructor

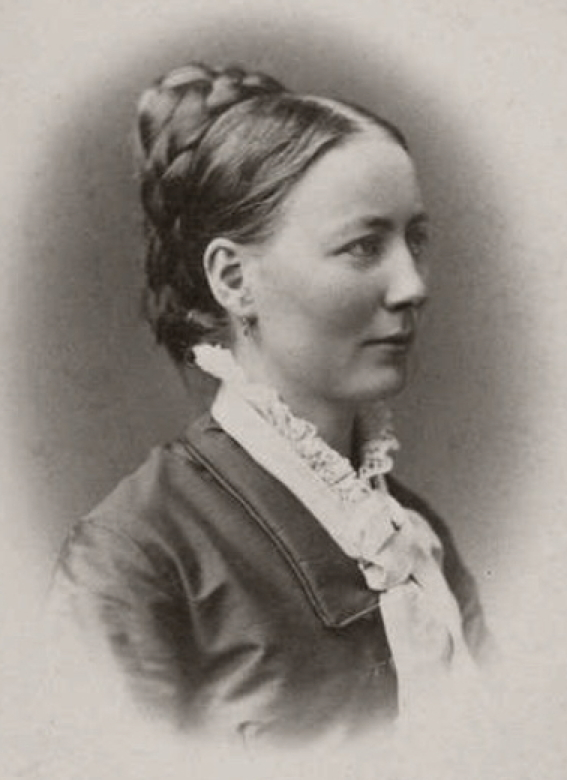
Johanna Brunsson

Johanna Brunsson (1846–1920) was a Swedish weaving arts instructor and school founder.

Johanna Brunsson was the daughter of a well-off farmer in Dalsland. During the Swedish famine of 1867–1869, she became a student in the weaving school of Maria Andersson. In 1873, she founded her first own weaving school, in Tångelanda, which she later moved to the capital.

She founded the famous Johanna Brunssons praktiska konstvävskola ('The Johanna Brunsson Practical Arts Weaving School') in Stockholm in 1889, which she managed until her death. Her school was famous in her time and a pioneer institution in the formal education of weaving art in Sweden, known as an institution that educated generations of weaving instructors. She also had international students from Europa, Russia and the United States.
