= Swedish Handicraft Association =

Nonprofit founded in 1899

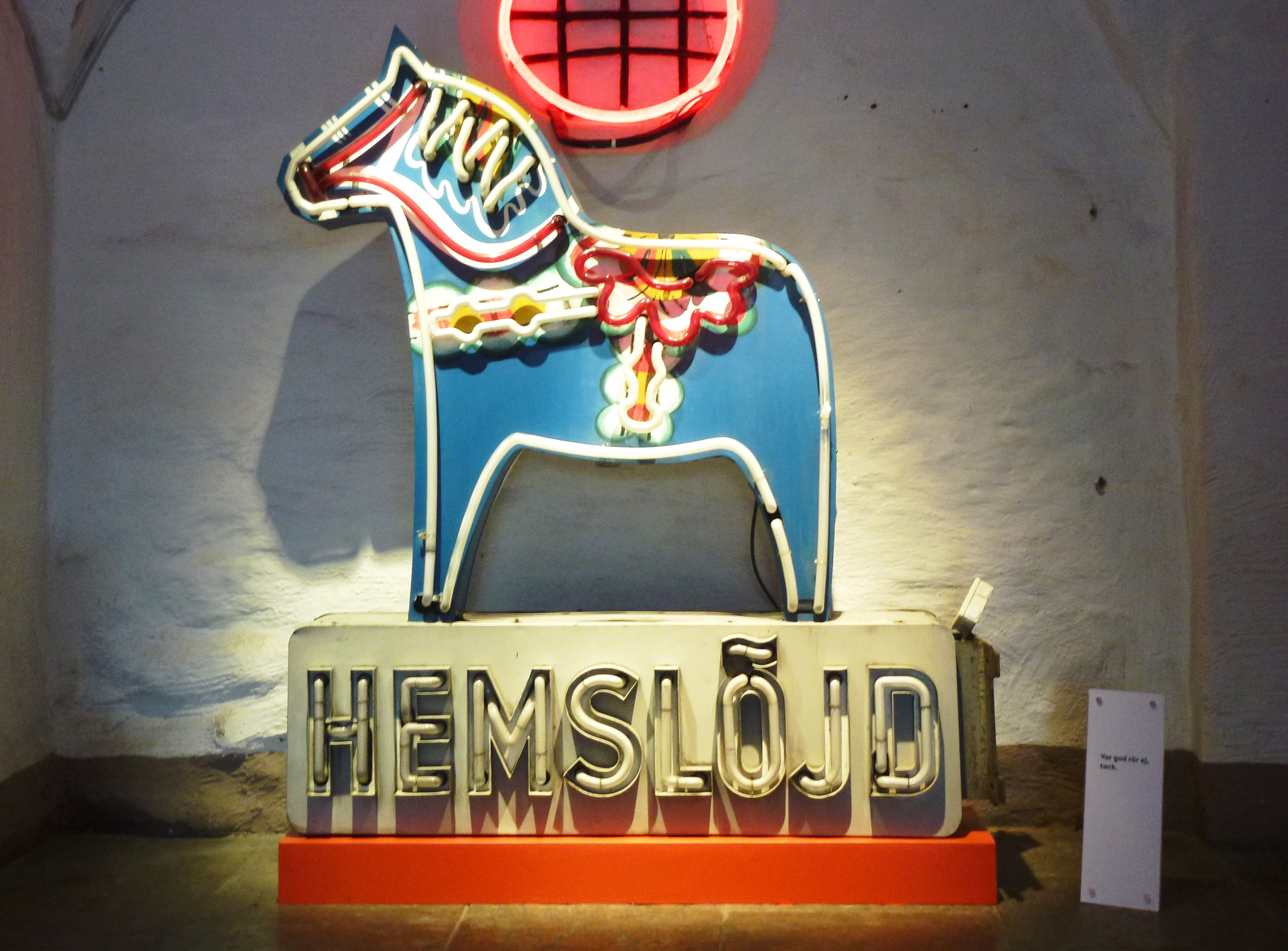
Hemslöjd sign with Dala horse

The Swedish Handicraft Association (Swedish: Föreningen för svensk hemslöjd) is a non-profit organization with regional offices and sales outlets throughout Sweden. Founded in 1899 by the textile artist Lilli Zickerman to market high-quality handicrafts at a store in central Stockholm, the association continues to encourage its members to collaborate in producing works of high artistic quality. Over the years, the association has developed retail shops, participated in exhibitions and promoted interest in Swedish handicrafts.

== 1 square metre of flax ==
In 2020, the regional organization for Västra Götaland County launched a flax revival project named "1 kvm lin" (1 square metre of flax), attracting 700 participants in that region. Based on the success, the same was tried in all regions of Sweden in 2021, which attracted 6000 participants, and in 2022 spread to the Nordic countries, Estonia and Scotland. Those who sign up for this program, receive a bag with 15 grams of flax seeds in the spring, just enough to sow one square metre. During the year, a series of newsletters with instructions for the cultivation, harvest and processing are sent to participants. Participants are also invited to a Facebook group for their region or country, and are encouraged to share their stories and photos on social media using hashtags like #1kvmlin (or #flaxScotland). In the autumn, regional flax processing parties are organized, for participants who lack the necessary equipment.

Flax and linen have a long history in the Nordic countries, but fell short to imported cotton during the 19th century. Attempts to revive and modernize the flax industry were made during both world wars, but wasn't sustainable in peacetime and the necessary government subsidies in Sweden ended in 1966.
