= Rya (rug) =

Traditional Scandinavian wool rug

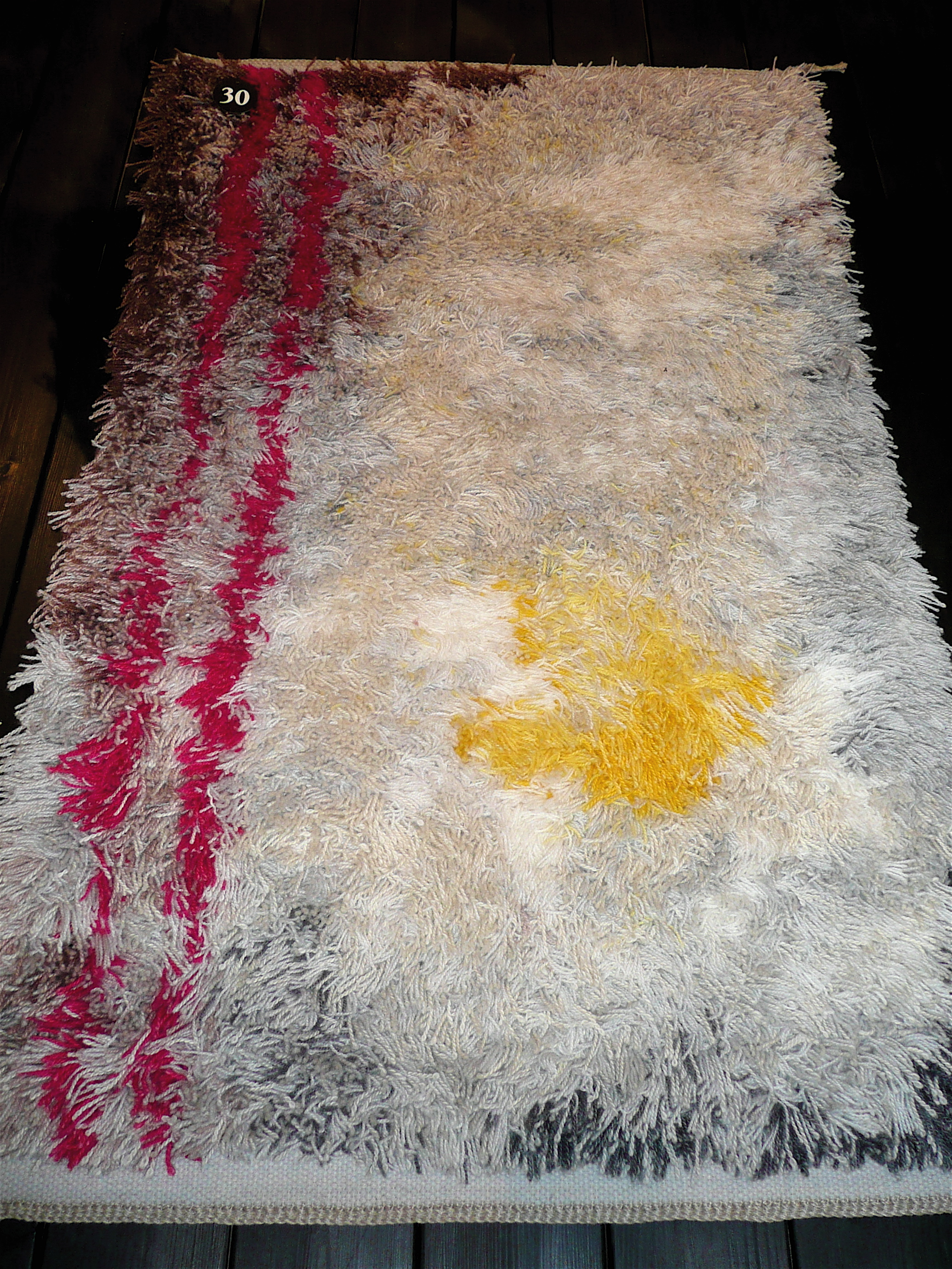
- Rya
- Type: Carpeting
- Material: Wool
- Production method: Knotting
- Production process: Craft production
- Place of origin: Scandinavia
- Introduced: 15th century

A rya or rye is a traditional Scandinavian wool rug with a long pile of about 1 to 3 inches. They are made using a form of the Ghiordes knot to make the double-sided pile fabric. Though rya means "rug" in English, the original meaning in Sweden of rya was a bed cover with a knotted pile. The first ryas originated in the early fifteenth century as coarse, long-piled, heavy covers used by mariners instead of furs. As time progressed, the rugs have evolved to be lighter and more colorful. The insulation that ryas provide protects against the cold Scandinavian climate. Ryas are a knotted pile carpet, with each knot composed of three strands of wool, which enables the rug to exhibit rich texture from all the different shades of color. The term rya may also refer to a breed of sheep whose wool is used to make rya carpets (see Rya (sheep)).

== History ==
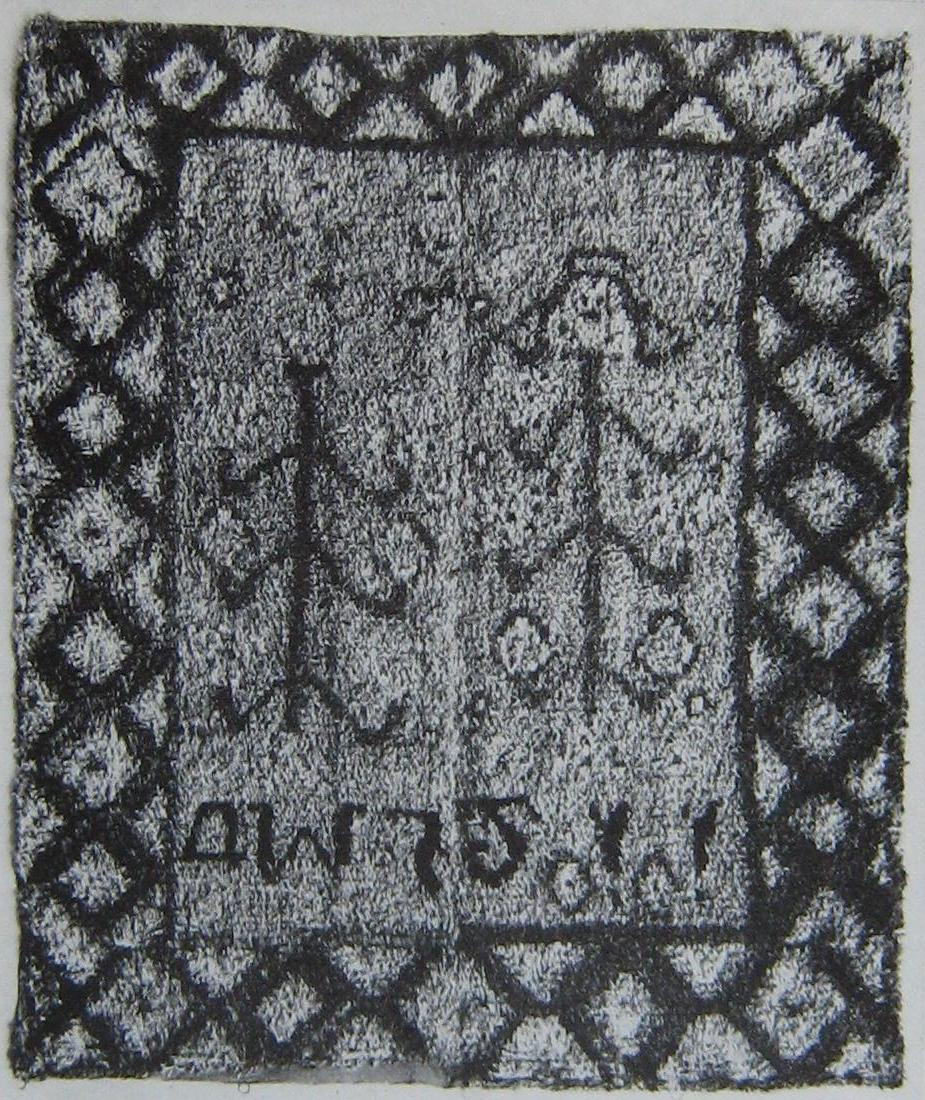
A traditional rya rug, dated to 1733

In the early 9th to 10th centuries, Islamic silk textiles were introduced to Scandinavia by Viking merchants who traded in Russia and the Byzantine Empire. Subsequently, the Scandinavian region acquired knotted pile carpets from the Ottomans in Anatolia. In fact, the Marby rug, one of the earliest surviving Turkish carpets was found in the Church of Marby near Jämtland, Sweden. Eventually, Scandinavians themselves produced rugs influenced by the oriental rug design.

Ryas in Norway have dated back to the early 15th century. During this time, they were worn by sailors, seal hunters, and fishermen to protect them from the frigid seas.

Before the rya rug in Sweden, peasants would sleep between fur skins, but the skins could become stiff and the fur could not be washed. The peasants then used wool plucked directly from the sheep without spinning to simulate fur as close as possible. They used the natural colors of the wool, which were black, white, and grey, to make simple patterns in the high pile. During the weaving, the wool was knotted in. The pile side of the rya had a soft sheen that resembled fur and was placed facing the body just like the fur skins were used previously. The pattern of the flat surface of other side was given less attention, and was the part on which the owner worked in their initials into the striped geometric design. Later, the wool was put into hot water before being used, which shrunk, stiffened, and tightened the wool. Consequently, the rugs were more durable, but were not as soft and glossy as earlier rya rugs.

At around 1690, a new kind of rya emerged that mimicked foreign Baroque floral patterns, woven by the daughters and wives of burghers in Stockholm and later in the country. This new rya had shorter piles and closer rows of knots, which made the rug lighter. Additionally, the pile side now faced up to display the design. Motifs from cross-stitch samplers were incorporated into the rya if foreign Baroque fabric was not available to copy. The new rya concept spread from southern Sweden to northern Sweden. Thus, the rya no longer kept its original practical role and instead became a daytime spread, thus forming the basis of modern-day rya rugs.

In Sweden, ryas were used by the nobility as bedding as well as a display of social status. However, by the 17th century, they lost their popularity with the nobility, and became bedding for the lower classes. In eighteenth century Finland, ryas became decorative, with animal, flower, and symbolic designs. They were used in weddings as prayer rugs. Rya rugs were part of the bride's dowry, and the brides were married standing on them. These ryas would be displayed in the home like tapestries as mementos of the wedding and would often be passed down for generations as family heirlooms.

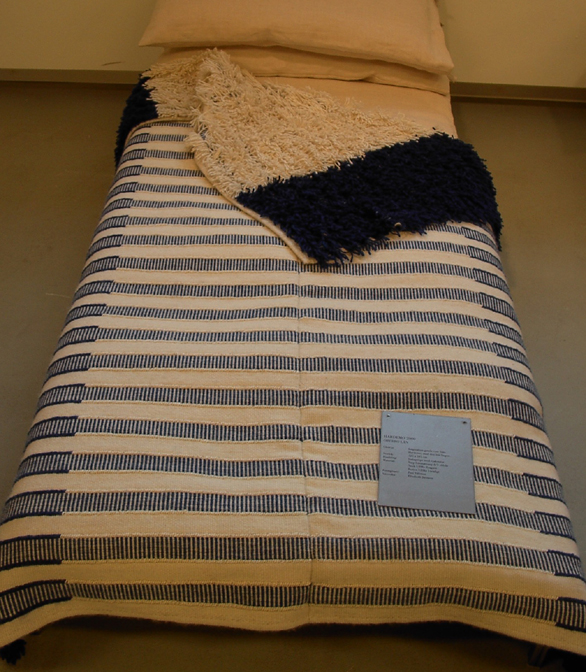
A rya blanket

In the 1970s, rya rugs became popular in the United States, though shag carpet was not extensively advertised or promoted by trendsetters. Finnish hand-knotted rya rugs were expensive and considered trendy. Some say that the shag rugs helped keep people warm during times of cold weather during the 1973 oil crisis when energy was expensive, but the rugs' popularity began before this period.

== See also ==
- Carpet
- Ryijy, the Finnish rya rug
