= Maja Andersson Wirde =

Swedish artist (1873–1952)

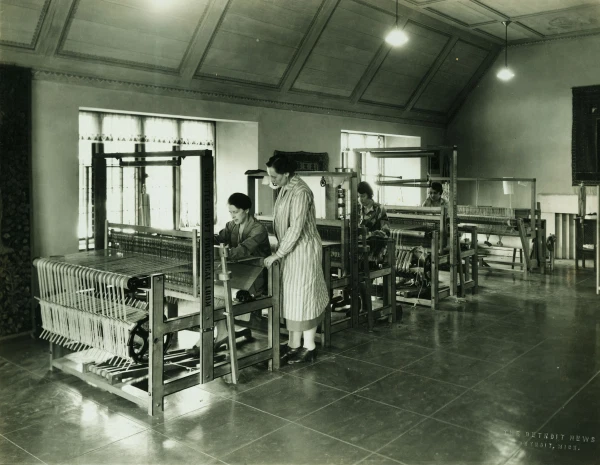
Maja Anderson Wirde (standing) while in Detroit (c. 1930)

Sigrid Maria (Maja) Andersson Wirde (1873–1952) was a leading Swedish textile artist in the first half of the 20th century. From 1907, she worked for 20 years as a pattern designer for the Friends of Handicraft or Handarbetets Vänner in Stockholm where she created large carpets for Stockholm City Hall and textiles for the transatlantic liner MS Kungsholm. In 1929, she moved to the United States to work for the Cranbrook Academy of Art in Detroit, producing high-quality fabrics and carpets for the newly built Kingswood Girls' School. In 1933, she returned to Sweden where she opened a textile business in her native Algutsboda, employing some 20 embroiderers and weavers to create textiles for churches.

== Biography ==
Born on 14 November 1873 in Ramkvilla, Småland, Sigrid Maria Andersson was the daughter of Carl August Andersson, a clergyman, and his wife Carolina née Sandberg. She was one of eight children. During her childhood, the family moved to Karlskrona and then to Algutsboda. A talented artist from an early age, in 1897 she studied at the Handicraft School in Stockholm, intending to become a drawing teacher. While a student, she went on study trips to London (1898 and 1901) and Italy (1902). After teaching drawing in Stockholm schools, in 1908 she was employed as a textile pattern designer at the Friends of Handicraft school where she remained for the next 20 years. Her colleagues included the textile artists Maja Sjöström, Carin Wästberg and Agda Österberg. Andersson Wirde designed textiles for churches, including an altar hanging for Lund Cathedral which was presented at Stockholm's 1909 Industrial Arts Exhibition. Other important works included the largest carpet ever (11 by 4 metres) for Stockholm's new city hall (1915) and textiles for the transatlantic liner MS Kungsholm (1928).

In 1929, Andersson Wirde moved to Detroit where she designed textiles for the Cranbrook Academy of Art and ran the weaving workshop at the facility established by Loja Saarinen from Finland who only employed weavers from Sweden. Considered to be of exceptionally high quality, the works she produced included carpets, curtains and textile furnishings for the recently completed Kingswood School. In 1933, Andersson Wirde returned to Sweden after the Cranbrook studios were closed during the Great Depression.

Settling in her native Algutsboda, together with the textile artist Sigrid Synnergren she established the company Södra Sveriges Kyrkliga Textil where textiles were produced for churches in Scania and Smålund. The brightly coloured fabrics were in such high demand that the company employed some 20 embroiders and weavers. Products included antependia, chasubles, altar cloths and carpets.

Maja Andersson Wirde died in Algutaboda on 11 February 1952.
