= Sigrid Synnergren =

Swedish textile artist

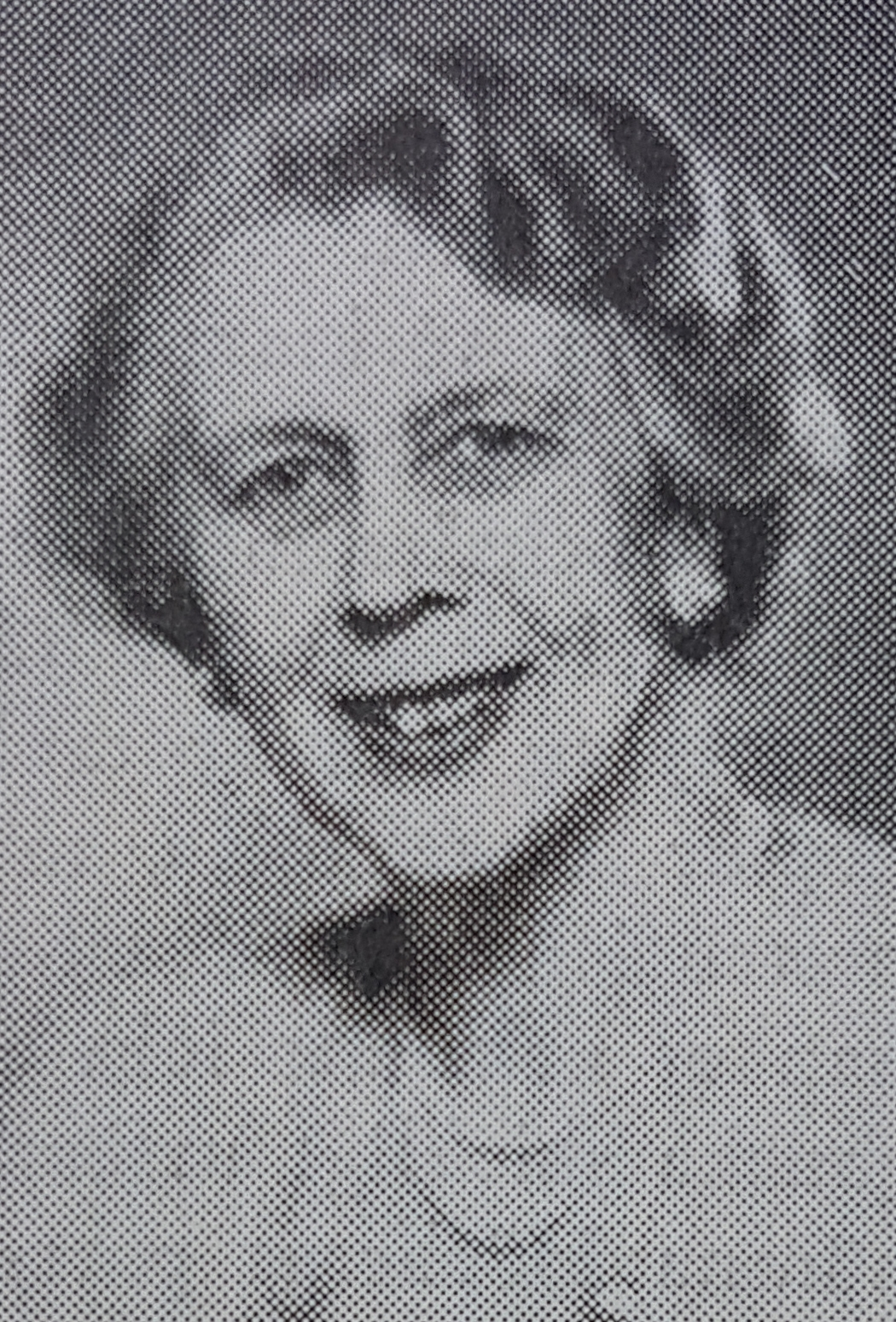
Sigrid Synnergren

Sigrid Birgitta Synnergren (1894–1986) was a Swedish textile artist who was active in the development of church textiles. After spending 10 years in Finland as principal of the Åbo Weaving and Sewing School, she returned to Sweden to head the Friends of Handicraft branch in Växjö where she produced textiles for churches in Småland. In 1939, together with Maja Andersson Wirde, she established the company Södra Sveriges Kyrkliga Textil for which she ran the Lund studio until 1967. In addition to decorative designs, Synnergren embroidered narrative scenes.

== Biography ==
Born on 21 October 1894 in Jönköping, Sigrid Birgitta Synnergren was the daughter of the manufacturer Johan Synnergren and his wife Johanna née Eriksson. She was the second youngest of eight children. From 1915–1918, she studied at Stockholm's Arts and Crafts College. Thanks to the grants she received, she then travelled abroad on several study trips.

In 1933, she was appointed director of the Friends of Handicraft establishment in Växjö. For her works displayed at the 1929 Barcelona World Fair, she won a silver medal. She also participated in the 1935 Brussels Fair and the 1937 Paris Fair. While in Växjö, she met Maja Andersson Wirde with whom she established the textile firm Södra Sveriges Kyrkliga Textil in 1939 which specialized in church fabrics. Wirde maintained a studio in Algutsboda while Synnergren had her own workshop in Lund. She created her own chasubles and antepedia while designing patterns for the team of embroiderers employed by the firm as it expanded in 1940s.

Over the years, Synnergren arranged and took part in over 30 exhibitions until the early 1960s, attracting many new customers. The firm's embroidered works were of a particularly high quality, always using fine materials, including silk threads with strands of silver and gold. Her designs extended from foliage and plants to narrative scenes.

Sigrid Synnergren died in Lund on 5 January 1986. She is buried in Jönköping's Östra kyrkogård.
