= Agda Österberg =

Swedish textile artist (1891–1987)

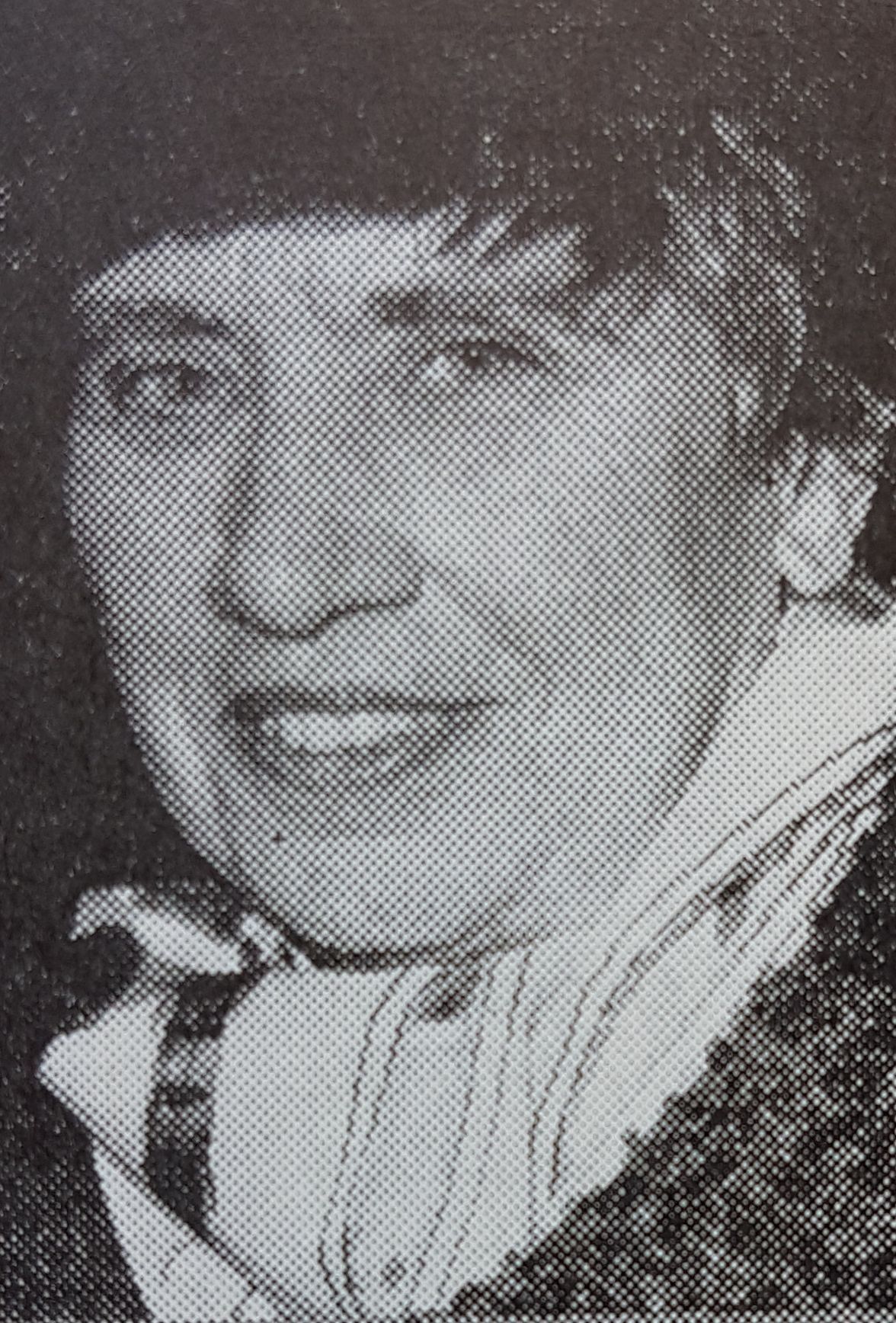
- Born: Agda Elisabeth Österberg; 28 October 1891; Stockholm, Sweden
- Died: 30 May 1987 (aged 95); Varnhem, Sweden
- Occupation: textile artist
- Known for: production of religious textiles
- Notable work: the firm Tre Bäcker, a major producer of church textiles, making numerous chasubles, antependia, chalice coverings, seats, collection bags and funeral palls for churches throughout Sweden
- Parents: August Österberg (father); Agnes Amelia Rebecka née Mittag (mother)

Agda Elisabeth Österberg (1891–1987) was a Swedish textile artist who was a prominent figure in the production of religious textiles. In 1933, she was appointed artistic director at Axevalla-Varnhem Slöjd. She took the business over in 1935, changing its name first to Firma Agda Österberg and later to Tre Bäcker, producing thousands of church textiles up to the 1970s. The firm also made rugs in Österberg's colourful abstract style.

== Biography ==
Born on 28 October 1891 in Stockholm, Agda Elisabeth Österberg was the daughter of the metal worker August Österberg and his wife Agnes Amelia Rebecka née Mittag. She was the second child of six. Her father died when she was 11, forcing her mother to earn a living by running a restaurant with one of her neighbours.

From the age of 13, Österberg worked as a nanny for a colonel's family where she showed a talent for embroidery. When she was 18, she was allowed to attend the Althin Painting School which led to evening classes at the Technical College. Thanks to a scholarship, from 1912 to 1914 she studied weaving there. Carin Wästberg, the artistic director of the Friends of Handicraft association selected her as an assistance for the textile artist Maja Sjöström. In 1916, Friends of Handicraft employed her as a pattern designer for upholstery, curtains and rugs.

From 1915 to 1921, she also worked as a ceramist for S:t Eriks Lervarufabriker in Uppsala, designing everyday items including tableware. She also designed decorated garden urns which were presented at the 1921 Uppsala Fabriks- och Hantverksförening's exhibition. In regard to textiles, she designed a knotted pile rug in 1920 for the Swedish Patent and Registration Office and in 1924 made four rugs for Crown Prince Gustav Adolf and his wife Louise. Many of her designs led to exhibits at the Friends of Handicraft 1923 exhibition in Gothenburg. In particular, her Djurgården rug was acclaimed for its colours and textures.

In 1933, Österberg was appointed artistic director of Axevalla-Varnhem Slöjd in Varnhem, a firm which produced rugs. Two years later, she took over the firm herself, changing its name to Firma Agda Österberg and later to Tre Bäcker. Under her leadership, the firm became a major producer of church textiles, making numerous chasubles, antependia, chalice coverings, seats, collection bags and funeral palls for churches throughout Sweden. Of particular note was the embroidery Johannes uppenbarelse (Apocalypse of John) which was presented at the 1937 Paris World Fair.

Agda Österberg died in Varnhem on 30 May 1987.
