= Carin Wästberg =

Swedish textile artist

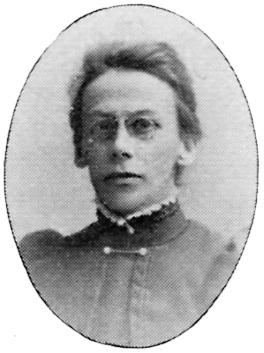
Carin Wästberg (1901)

Carin Helena Wästberg (1859–1942) was a Swedish textile artist who helped to revive interest in textile arts in Sweden inspired by local peasant techniques and the developments she had seen in England. As its leader from 1904, she developed the Friends of Handicraft association into the country's top textile producer, creating a new production technique in collaboration with Maja Sjöström. Under her leadership, the association produced many notable works for public buildings in Stockholm, including those she herself designed in 1915 for the Stockholm Court House.

== Biography ==
Born on 5 June 1859 in Vänersborg, Carin Helena Wästberg was the daughter of Hans Efraim Wästberg, a clergyman, and his wife Anna née Andersdotter. Brought up with her siblings in an educated home, from 1880 she studied handicrafts at Stockholm's Technical College until 1885. While there, together with fellow student Maria Widebeck, she founded the textile company Widebeck och Wästberg. Establishing an excellent friendship, they ran the company and lived together for the rest of their lives.

From 1887, she was employed by Friends of Handicraft as a pattern designer. Thanks to a travel grant, in 1891 together with Widebeck she spent three months in England where she took special interest in the work of the textile designer William Morris (1834–1896), thereafter adopting his approach to arts and crafts In Sweden.

As a result of internal disputes at the Friends of Handicraft, in 1904 Agnes Branting resigned as head. Wästberg became the association's artistic director in 1904 and served as its director from 1910 until her retirement in 1930. It was under her leadership that several of Sweden's most significant textile artists were employed as designers; they included Maja Sjöström, Agda Österberg, and Annie Frykholm. Together with Sjöström, Wästeberg developed a simplified weaving technique in 1905, producing upholstery much more quickly. Works using the new technique were produced for the Gustaf Adolf chapel in Lucerne, Switzerland. One of Wästberg's most outstanding creations was her haute lisse linen Värdinge fuga in 1904 which was bought by Queen Victoria at an exhibition in St Petersburg in 1908.

Carin Wästberg died on 9 April 1942. She is buried in the old cemetery at Skara.
