= Maria Widebeck =

Swedish textile artist and illustrator (1858–1929)

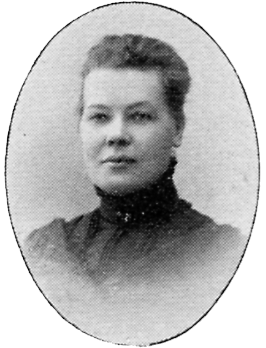
Maria Widebeck (1901)

Maria Cecilia Widebeck (1858–1929) was a Swedish textile artist and illustrator who assisted her friend Carin Wästberg to revive interest in fabrics inspired by local peasant techniques. While working as a pattern designer for the Friends of Handicraft association, together with Wästberg she established the textile firm Widebeck och Wästberg producing fabrics with the WW logo. Widebeck made most of the illustrations presented in Klingspor's book on coats of arms and family crests.

== Biography ==
Born in Strängnäs on 1 March 1858, Maria Cecilia Widebeck was the daughter of the clergyman Samuel Widebeck and his wife Carolina Ulrika née Ekmarck. From 1880 to 1885, she studied arts and crafts at the Technical College in Stockholm. While there, she met fellow student Carin Wästberg who became her lifelong friend. Together they established the textile company Widebeck och Wästbeck. The ran the company and lived together for the rest of their lives.

From 1887, she was employed by Friends of Handicraft as a pattern designer. Thanks to a travel grant, in 1891 together with Wästberg she spent three months in England where they both took a special interest in the work of the textile designer William Morris (1834–1896), thereafter adopting his approach to arts and crafts In Sweden.

In 1905, Widebeck was appointed director of the Friends of Handicraft association's museum and archives. In addition to textile design, she worked with glass, silver and furniture. Her skill as an illustrator is evidenced by some 4,000 drawings of coats of arms and family crests contained in Carl Arvid Klingspor's Sveriges ridderskaps och adels vapenbok.

Maria Widebeck died in Strängnäs on 5 May 1929 and is buried in the old cemetery (Gamla kyrkogården).
