= Agnes Branting =

Swedish textile artist and writer

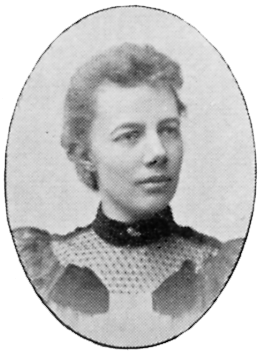
Agnes Branting (1901)

Agnes Margareta Matilda Branting (27 February 1862 – 13 April 1930, Stockholm) was a Swedish textile artist and writer. As director of the Friends of Handicraft association from 1891, she undertook developments in large woven tapestries with several prominent artists which led to Sweden's freestyle woven visual art. In 1904, she established the Licium workshop which produced religious and heraldic fabrics including flags and banners. She was also active in the preservation of textiles, establishing the Pietas society for this purpose. As a writer, she contributed articles on arts and crafts to Svenska Dagbladet and published books on textiles.

== Biography ==
Born on 27 February 1862 in Åtorp, Värmland, Agnes Margareta Matilda Branting was the daughter of the pharmacist Carl Johan Branting and his wife Maria Carolina née Lundh. After her father died when she was seven, the family moved to Skara where she attended the girls' school. In 1880, she studied textile art and drawing at the Technical College in Stockholm, graduating in 1874.

In 1884, she was employed as a pattern designer at the Friends of Handicraft association. While there, she went on a trip to England where she studied the textile work of William Morris. She also went to Germany to study developments in textiles there. In 1891, she was appointed director and chief artistic designer at the Friends of Handicraft. She took a particular interest in religious textile works and their conservation. Thanks to her relationships with several leading artists, she conducted experiments on the development of pictorial tapestries, making them an increasingly important feature of Swedish art. One of the major works produced was the large tapestry Kräftfisket which was presented at the 1900 Paris World Fair.

After resigning from her position at Friends of Handicraft in 1904, she immediately set up Licium, a workshop specializing in religious and heraldic textiles. Drawing on the collaboration of artists including Anders Zorn and Gunnar Wennerberg, the firm produced pictorial tapestries in addition to decorative carpets and upholstery. The religious works produced at Licium included chasubles and altar cloths for a number of churches, including Lund Cathedral.

In 1908, Branting established Pietas, an enterprise devoted to the conservation of old Swedish textiles, including those of the cathedrals of Uppsala and Linköping. As a result of study trips at home and abroad, she was able to improve methods of conservation. As an author, she published articles in specialist journals such as Fataburen, Fornvännen and Ord och Bild. Her books included the two-volume Medeltida vävnader och broderier i Sverige (1928 and 1929) on weaving and embroidery in Sweden. Her awards included Litteris et Artibus (1896) and Illis Quorum (1919).

Agnes Branting died on 13 April 1930 in Stockholm.
