= Ödenäs Church =

Church in Ödenäs, Västergötland, Sweden

Coordinates: 57°49′0.5″N 12°33′39″E

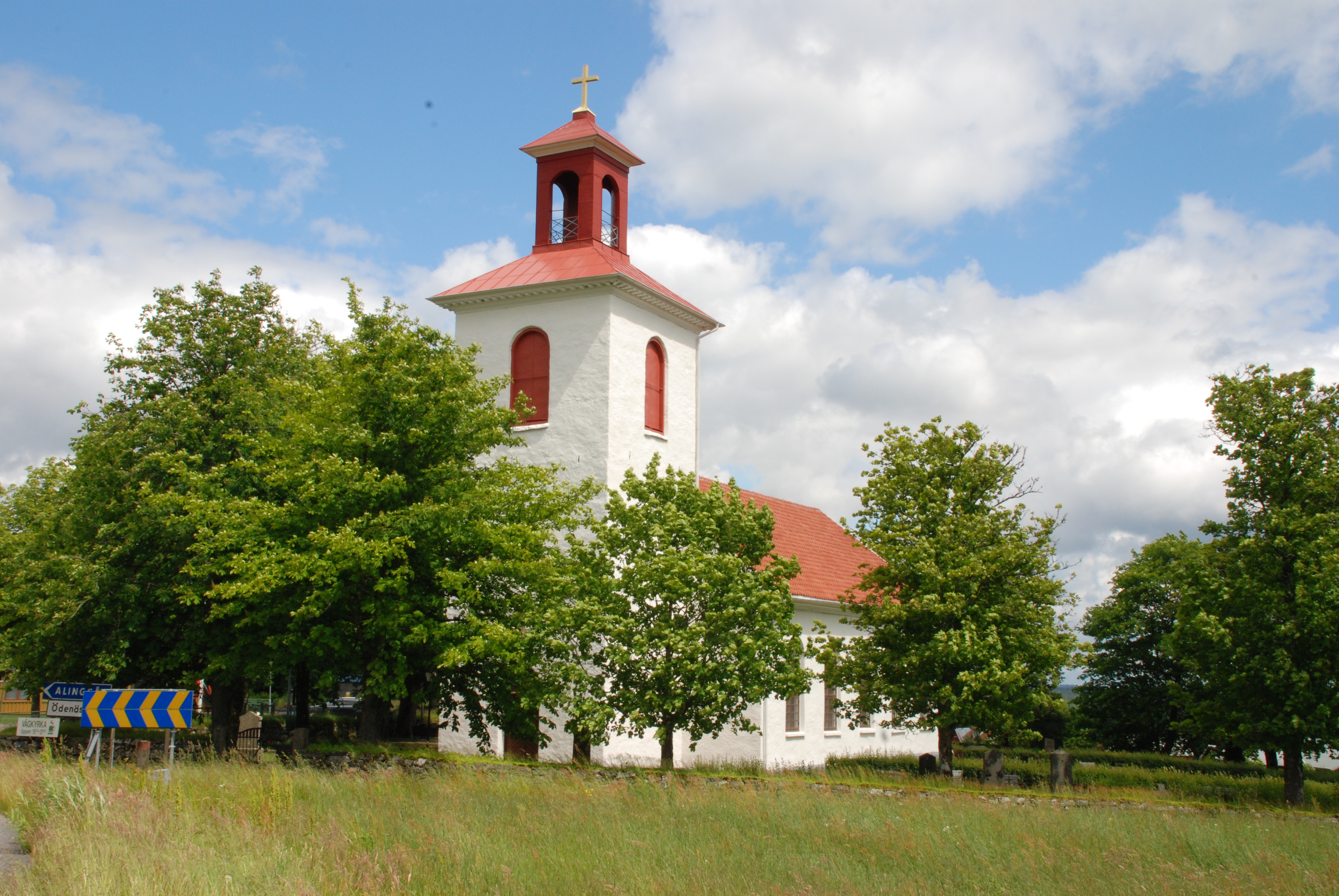
The church in 2012

Ödenäs Church (Swedish: Ödenäs kyrka) is a church in Ödenäs, Alingsås, Västergötland, Sweden. It belongs to the parish of Ödenäs, in the Diocese of Skara. Two former wooden churches preceded the current stone church, and one from the Middle Ages and also one from about 1700. The current church building was built in 1840 and designed by Fredrik Wilhelm Scholander. In the nave's west side is a tower with a lantern. The organ was added in 1921 by Olof Hammarberg.
