= Anna Boberg =

Swedish artist

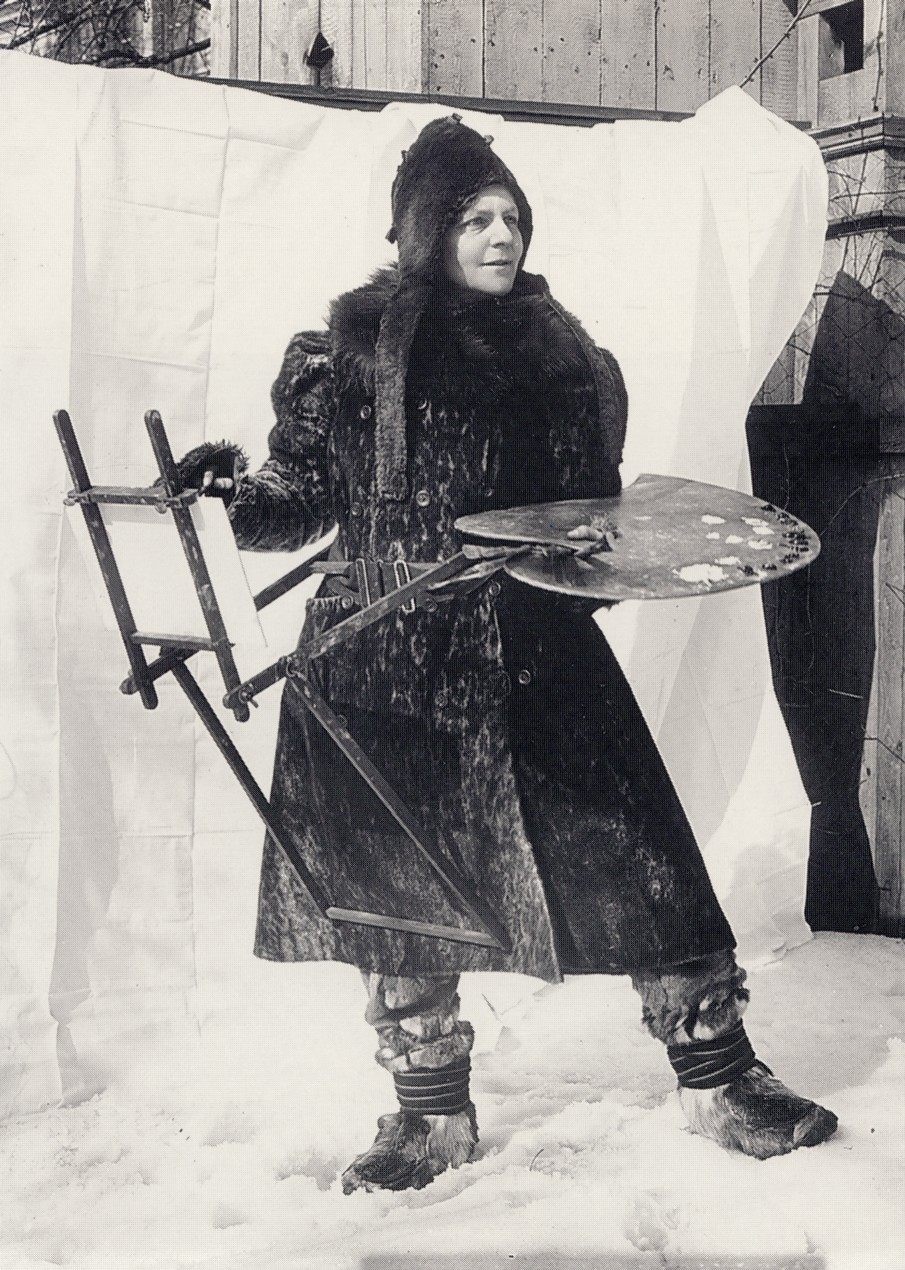
- Anna Boberg 1910
- Born: Anna Katarina Scholander; 13 December 1864; Stockholm, Sweden
- Died: 27 January 1935 (aged 70); Stockholm, Sweden
- Known for: Painting
- Spouse: Ferdinand Boberg (m. 1888)

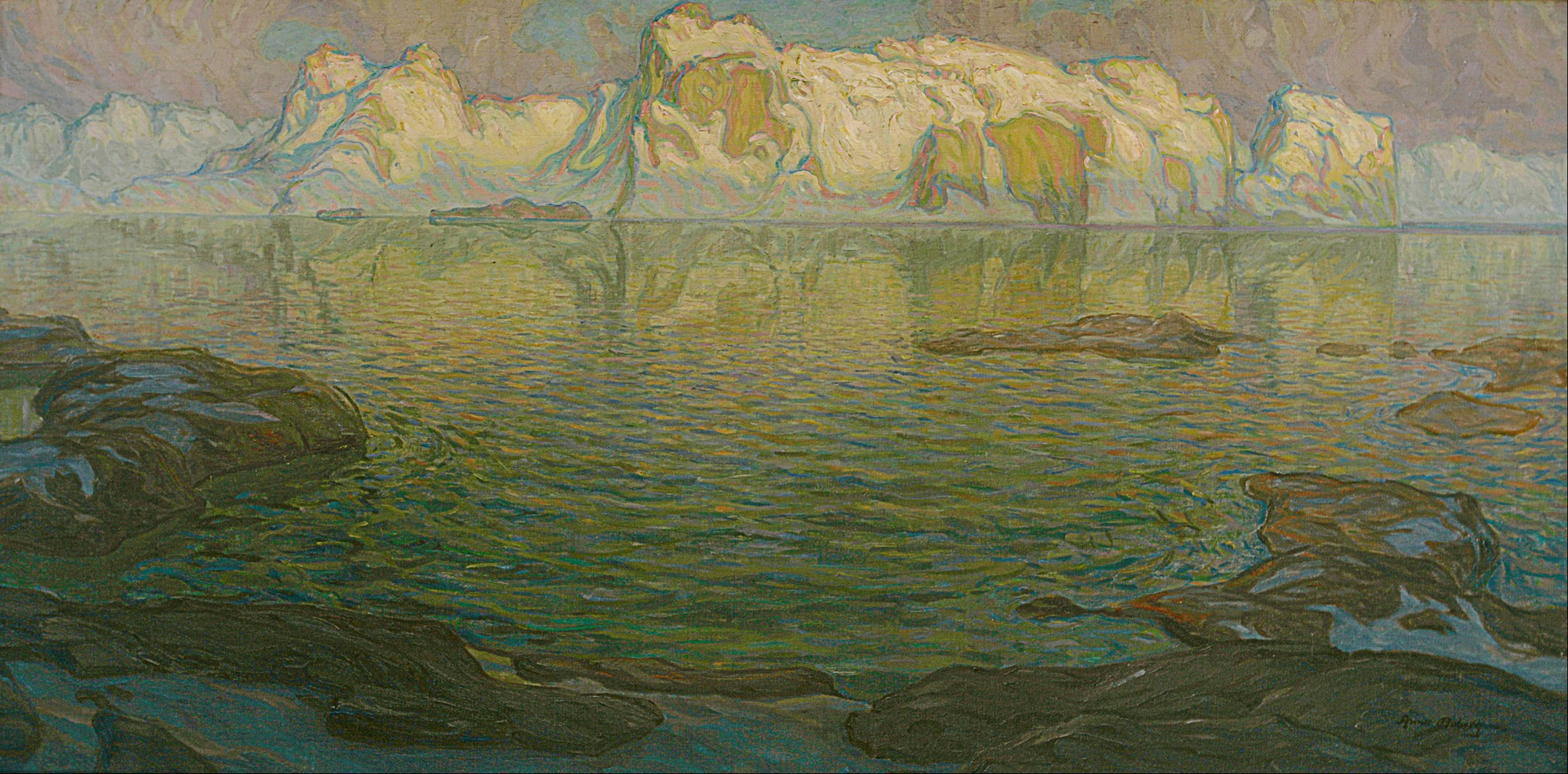
Anna Boberg, Silent Evening: Scene from Lofoten, oil on canvas, 1910–14

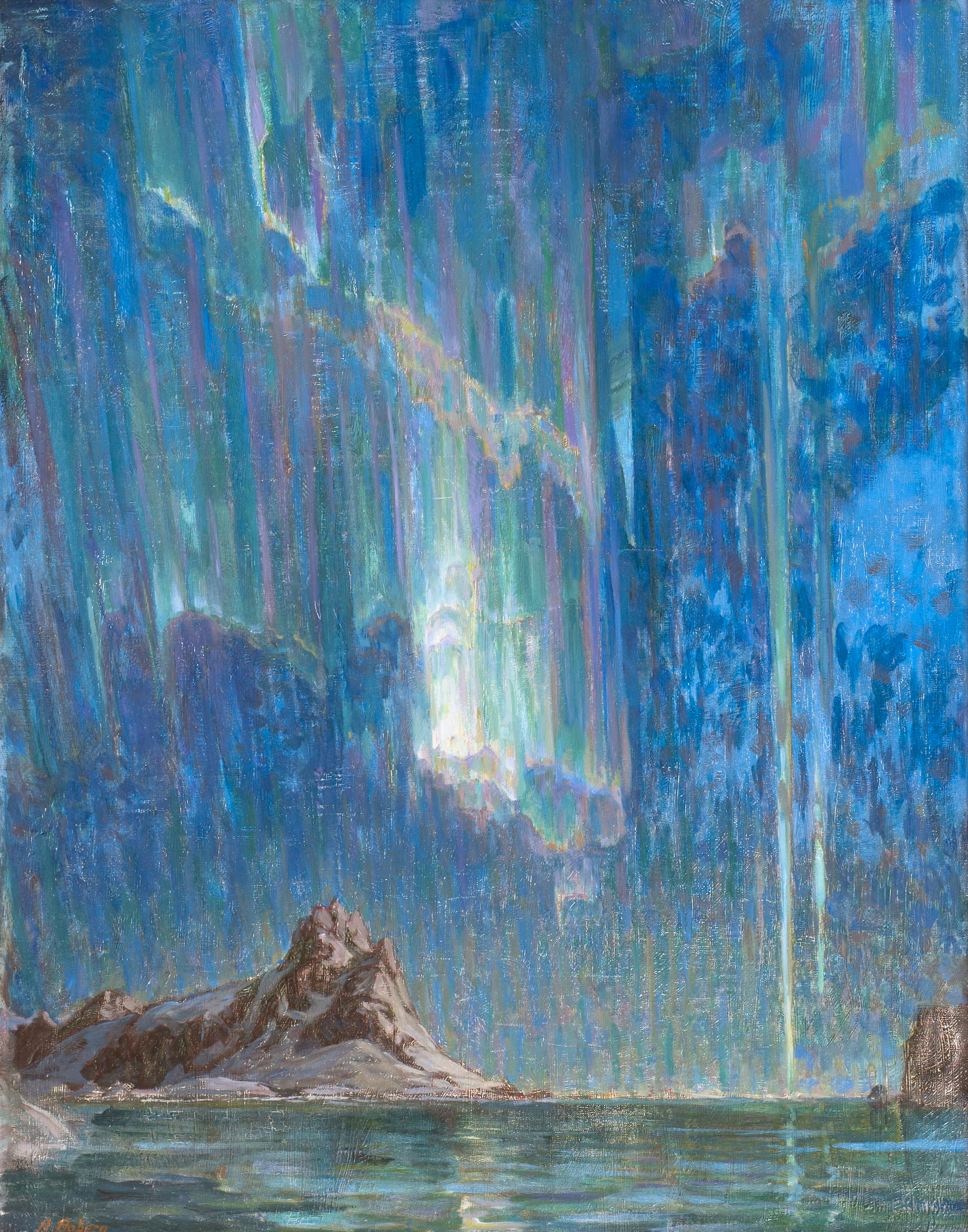
Anna Boberg, Northern Lights, oil on canvas, n.d.

Anna Katarina Boberg, née Scholander, (3 December 1864 – 27 January 1935) was a Swedish artist married to prominent architect Ferdinand Boberg. Anna Scholander was the daughter of architect Fredrik Wilhelm Scholander and the granddaughter of Axel Nyström. Boberg was a person of many artistic pursuits; initially she worked with ceramics and textiles (among other things she created "the Peacock vase" for Rörstrand) and besides painting she also worked with set design and writing, for example. She came from an artistic family, but never received any formal training in the arts, and is considered an autodidact. Many of her paintings are of northern Norway, which became Boberg's main focus for many years after a trip there in 1901. These works were not received very well in Sweden, but did much better in Paris. Boberg spent a great deal of time in the area near Lofoten in Norway, where she eventually had a cabin, and made many of those trips on her own.

== Life and work ==
Boberg was the sixth of seven children in the Scholander family. She studied French, and was briefly enrolled at the Académie Julian in Paris to study painting. Paris is also where she met future architect and her spouse-to-be Ferdinand Boberg, who was there on a study trip. They were engaged in 1884. Ferdinand Boberg was at the time far from having his finances in order, but Boberg persuaded her mother Carin, née Nyström, to allow them to marry anyway; her father had died in 1881. Boberg lacked formal training but began painting already in 1882 during a trip to Spain with her mother and some of her siblings. Her father had found a profitable sideline in painting and drawing. The Bobergs married in 1888, initially staying with the Scholanders, until their improved economy allowed them to move into their own flat at Tegnérgatan 13 in Stockholm. In 1896 the couple had their summer house Villa Ugglebo built in Norra Djurgården in Stockholm. In the 1890s, Boberg joined Nya Idun, a women's association.

In 1887, Boberg began painting in earnest, mainly using watercolour, and she had her first exhibition in 1888. During the 1890s she also painted 'tapestries,' oil paintings on rough canvas reminiscent of woven tapestries. These 'tapestries' were displayed as wall decorations in, among other places, Hôtel Rydberg (which was later demolished, and the tapestries were transferred to Årsta Castle). She also created wall decorations for the Wallenberg Grand Hotel Saltsjöbaden. Boberg exhibited her work at the Palace of Fine Arts at the 1893 World's Columbian Exposition in Chicago, Illinois.

Around the turn of the century 1800–1900 Boberg also worked with applied arts. She designed the Peacock Vase (Påfågelvasen) for Rörstrand in 1897 and glass for Reijmyre glassworks, as well as textile works. At the World Fair in Paris in 1900, where Ferdinand Boberg was the architect for the Swedish pavilion, Boberg created numerous textiles, which were woven by the Friends of Handicraft association (Handarbetets vänner) and the K.A. Almgren silk factory. She was also the writer and set designer for Wilhelm Stenhammar's opera Tirfing, performed in 1898.

During a trip to northern Sweden and Norway with her husband in 1901, Boberg was mesmerized by the grandiose scenery and nature of northern Norway, Lofoten in particular. During the following 33 years she painted mainly the landscapes and people of Lofoten, often in wintertime. In 1904, her husband designed a small house for her, which was built on the Fyrön island by Svolvær, where Boberg could stay during her many trips to Lofoten. She most often took these trips alone.

In 1903, Boberg showed her Lofoten paintings in Stockholm for the first time and the reactions were mixed. An exhibition in Paris in 1905 brought greater success and overwhelmingly positive feedback, laying the foundation for a prolific career in France. The last exhibition took place in 1927.

== After 1915 ==
When Ferdinand Boberg withdrew from his career as an architect in 1915, Boberg joined him on the many extensive journeys he made through Sweden for the "Swedish images" project. The trips were initially made in a Scania Vabis bus with a driver. Ferdinand Boberg sketched buildings of significance to the cultural heritage, to document areas he thought would disappear within a not too distant future. Boberg made diary notes along the way, the result of which was later published.

In 1925, the Bobergs were forced to sell Villa Vintra on Södra Djurgården, designed by Ferdinand, where they had lived since 1903. After this, they moved to Paris. In March 1929, the couple returned to Stockholm, residing in Villa Blecktornet on Södermalm until Boberg's death from gall bladder surgery complications in 1935. Swedish royalty Crown Prince Gustav Adolf, Princess Ingrid and Prince Bertil attended her funeral.
