= Kaisa Melanton =

Swedish textile artist

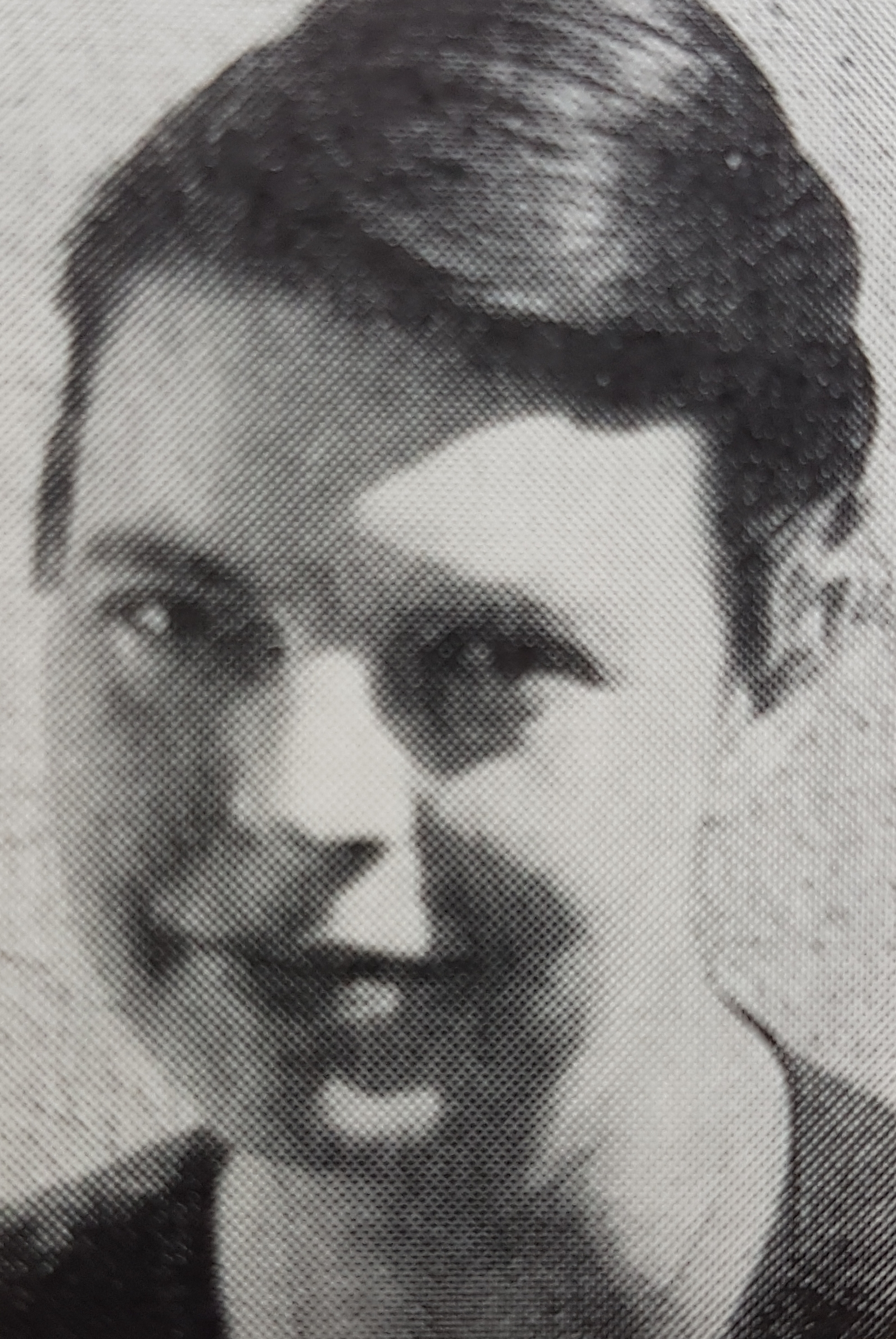
Kaisa Melanton

Kaisa Brita Melanton née Björklund (1920–2012) was a pioneering Swedish textile artist who is remembered in particular for the large, post-modernist works she created for local authorities, theatres, and churches. She employed a variety of techniques, including embroidery and weaving. From 1969 to 1979, she served as head of the textile department at Konstfack, the Swedish University of Arts, Crafts and Design, and in 1974 was elected a member of the Royal Swedish Academy of Fine Arts.

== Early life and education ==
Born on 1 January 1920 in Stockholm, Kaisa Brita Björklund was the daughter of the engineer Erik Einar Björklund and his wife Estrid Birgitta Nikolina née Larsson. She was brought up in the middle-class suburb of Täby where she was introduced to weaving by her maternal grandmother.

When she was 18, she spent a year training as an art teacher at Konstfack but then transferred to courses in textiles under Barbro Nilsson (1899–1983), graduating in 1943. She married fellow student Erland Melanton, who became a drawing teacher in Örnsköldsvik. The family spent a number of years there before returning to Stockholm. They had four children together: Lotta, Stina, Jörgen, and Johan.

== Career ==
Kaisa Melanton began working with Handarbetets Vänner in the early 1950s, collaborating on the Russian weave technique to produce Blå eld (1963) for the theatre and library in Eskilstuna and the enormous Vandring i Solnaskogen tapestry (1965) for the city hall in Solna. She went on to design the Det fria ordet triptych, inspired by summer on the island of Öland. In 1969, Melanton succeeded Edna Martin as the head textile teacher at Konstfack, where she remained for ten years. In parallel, she worked for the Båstad textile company, Märta Måås-Fjetterström AB.

Throughout her life, she created works for churches and municipal authorities. In particular, commissioned by the National Swedish Arts Council, she created a series of works for the Swedish Enforcement Authority, which can now be seen in Stockholm's National Museum of Fine Arts. They were produced in a variety of techniques, including application, embroidery, and weaving. In 1974, she was elected a member of the Royal Swedish Academy. She continued to be active in later life, producing a number of works for the Stockholm Concert Hall in 2002. In 1980, she was awarded the Prince Eugen Medal.

Kaisa Melanton died in Stockholm on 12 November 2012.
