= Fredrik Wilhelm Scholander =

Swedish architect and artist

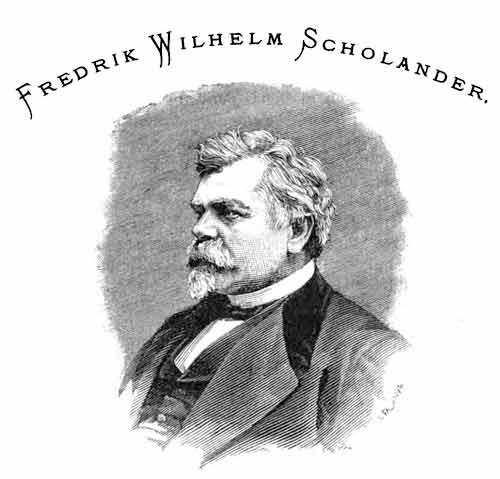
Fredrik Wilhelm Scholander

Fredrik Wilhelm Scholander (23 June 1816 – 9 May 1881) was a Swedish architect and artist.

== Biography ==
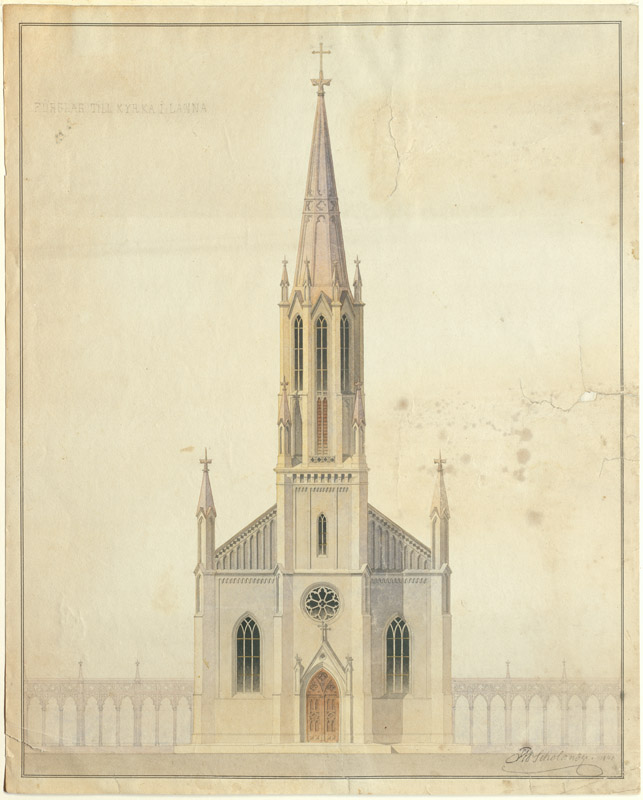
Drawing for Lannaskede-Myresjö Church (1841)

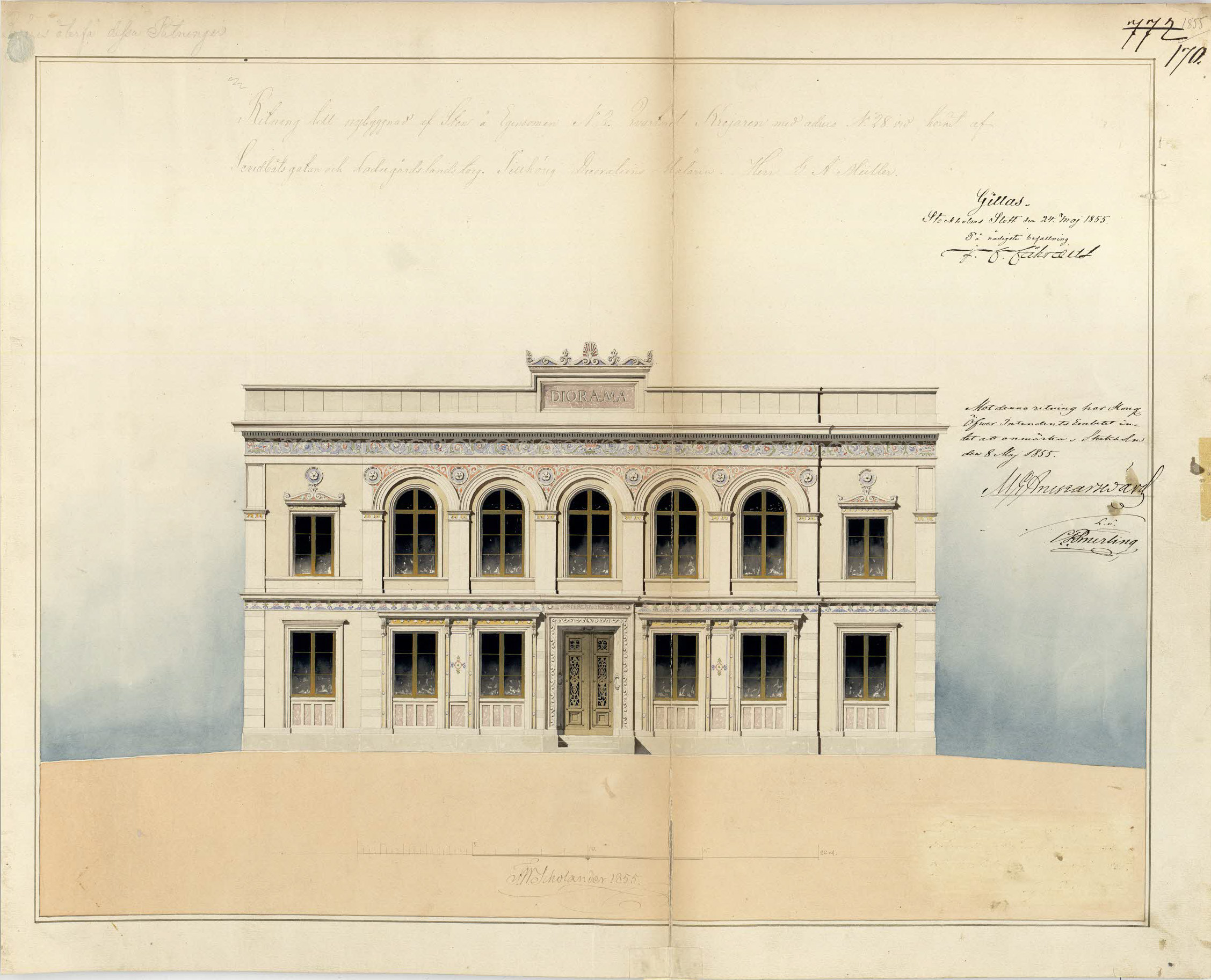
Drawing for Ladugårdslandsteatern (1855)

Fredrik Wilhelm Scholander was born in Stockholm, Sweden. He was the son of Georg Fredrik Scholander (1785–1825) and Karin Nyström (1786–1866). His mother was the sister of architect Per Axel Nyström (1793–1868). He became fatherless at the age of nine, and his uncle then became his foster father. Scholander studied art in 1831 at the Royal Swedish Academy of Arts. He settled in Paris in 1841, where for almost two years he was a student of Louis-Hippolyte Lebas (1782–1867) at École des Beaux-Arts.

He was called in 1847 as vice-professor and became a full professor of architecture at the Royal Swedish Academy of Arts in 1848. He trained many members of the next generation of Swedish architects, among them Helgo Zettervall (1831–1907) and Isak Gustaf Clason (1856–1930). From 1851 to 1853 he was a director and between 1851 and 1866 he served as treasurer. In 1868, he became the academy's secretary and held this position until his death.

Among his main works are the Stockholm Synagogue, the Katedralskolan school building in Uppsala, the County Museum in Växjö, Stadshotellet in Mariestad, the former KTH Royal Institute of Technology building on Drottninggatan in Stockholm, the Bernadotte royal burial chapel at Riddarholmen Church, as well as several interiors at Drottningholm Palace and the Stockholm Palace.

== Personal life ==
Scholander was married to his cousin Carin Nyström (1830–1912). They had seven children; among them musician and composer Sven Scholander (1860–1936) and artist Anna Boberg (1864–1935). Scholander died in 1881 and was buried at Norra begravningsplatsen in Solna.

== Gallery ==
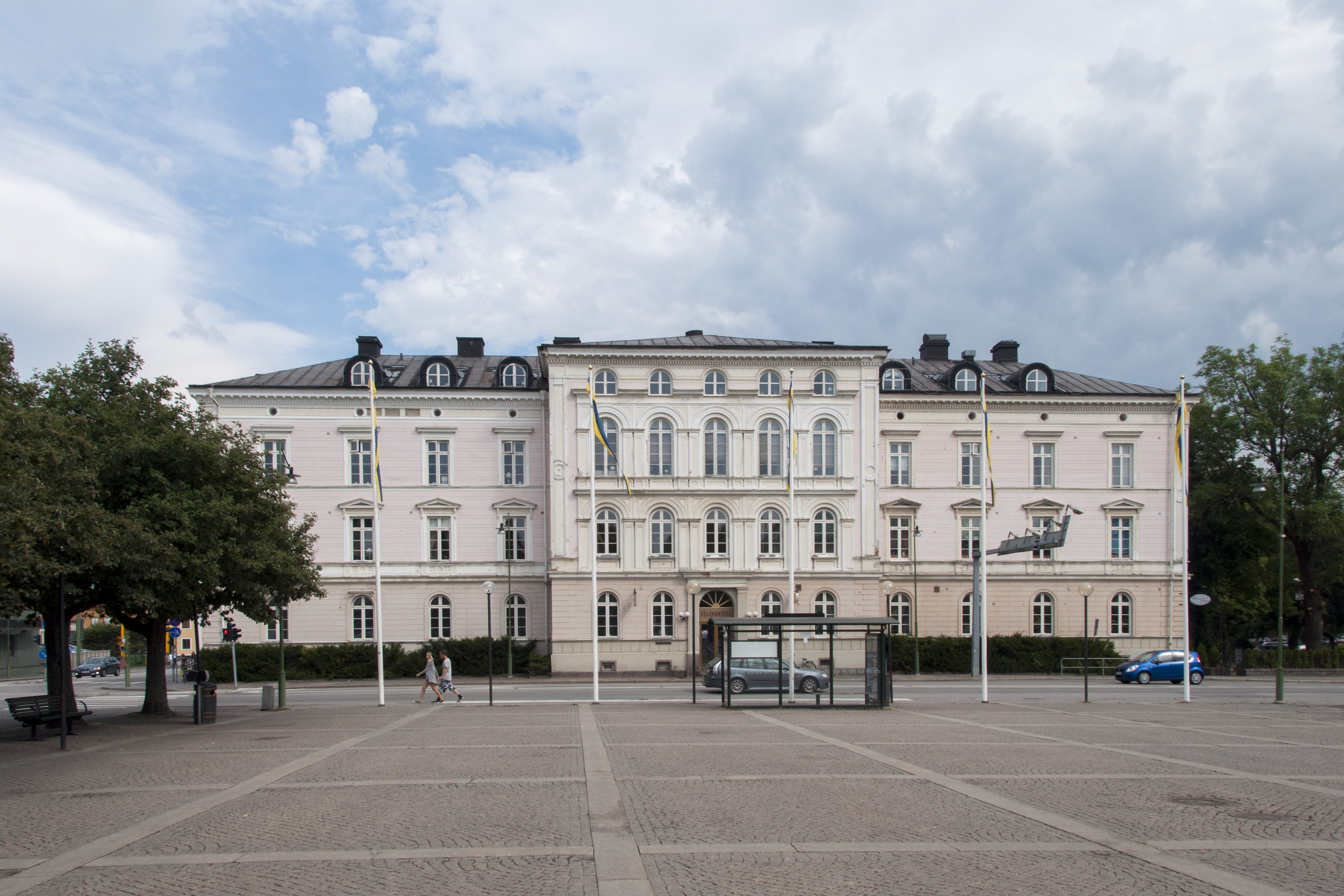
Stadshotellet, Mariestad

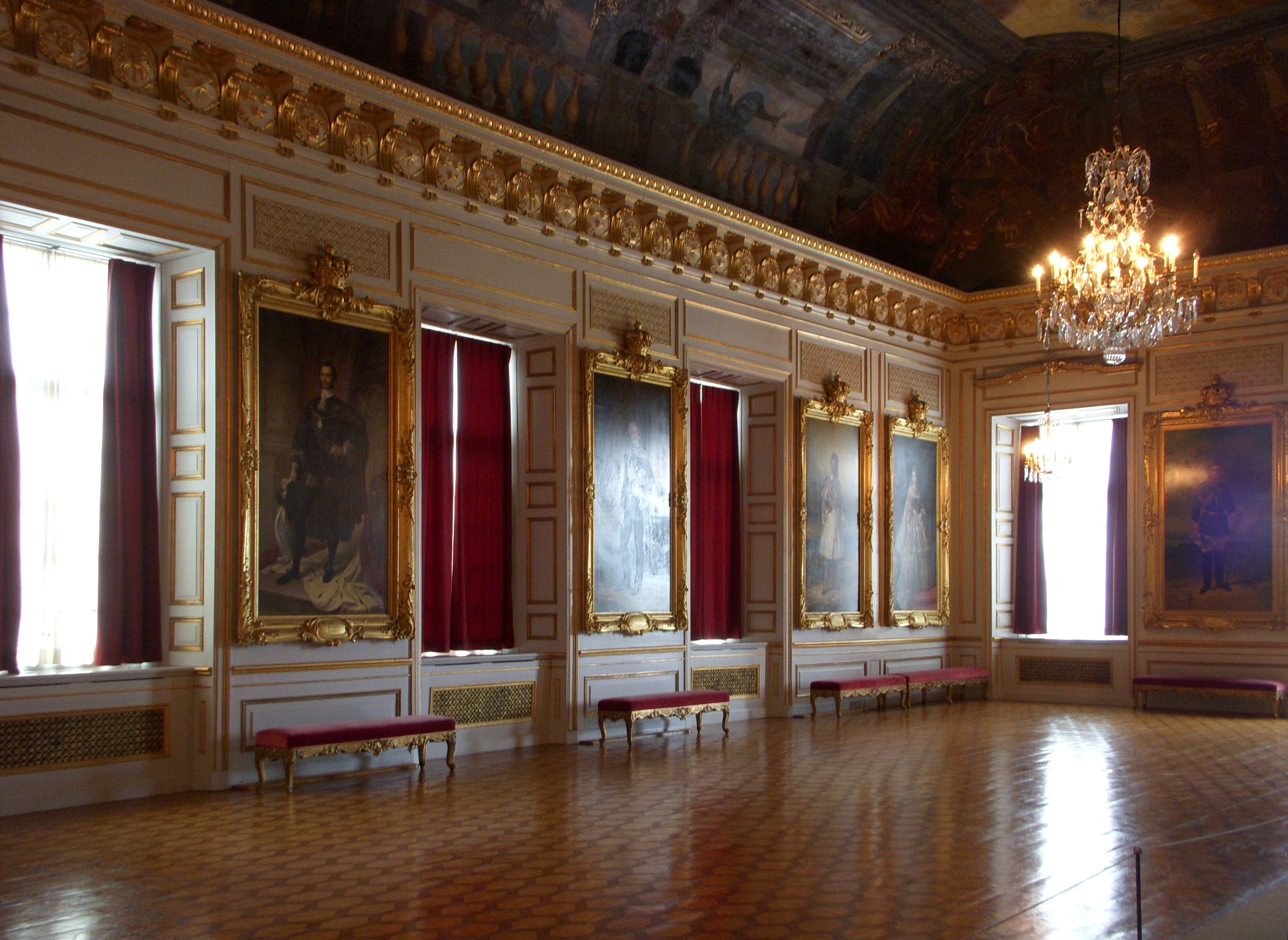
Rikssalen at Drottningholm Palace

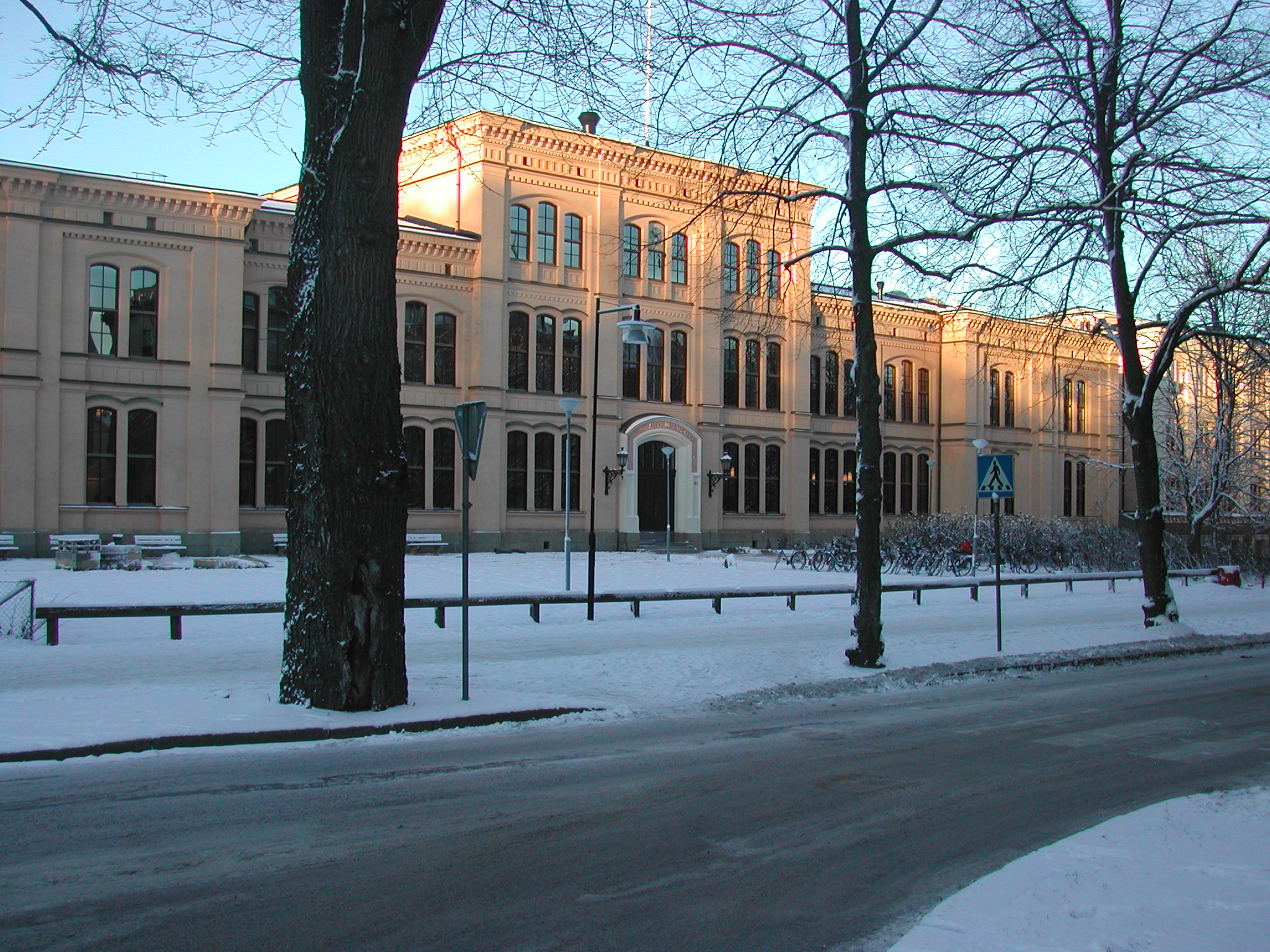
Katedralskolan, Uppsala

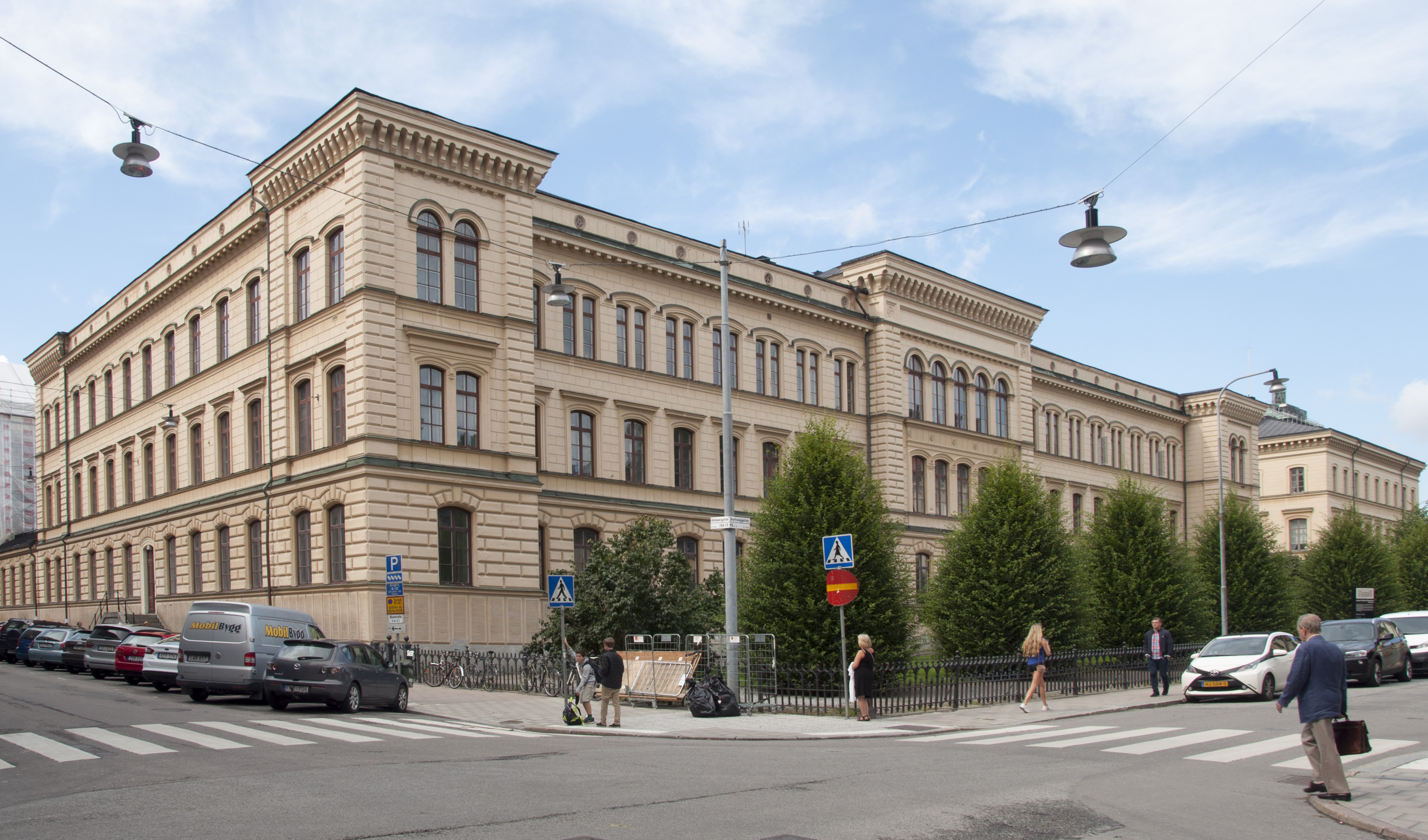
The former building of KTH Royal Institute of Technology, Stockholm

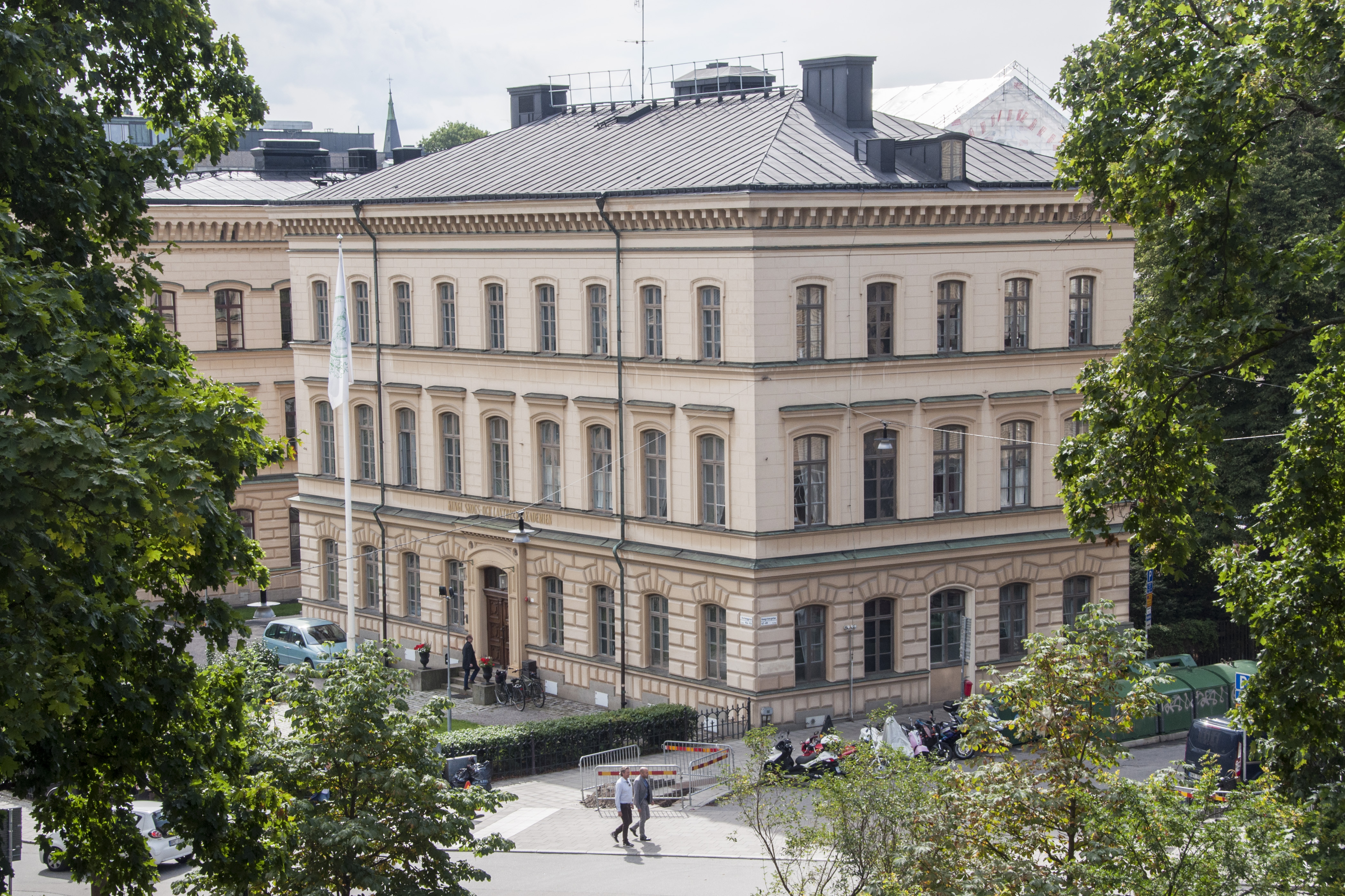
Royal Forest and Agricultural Academy

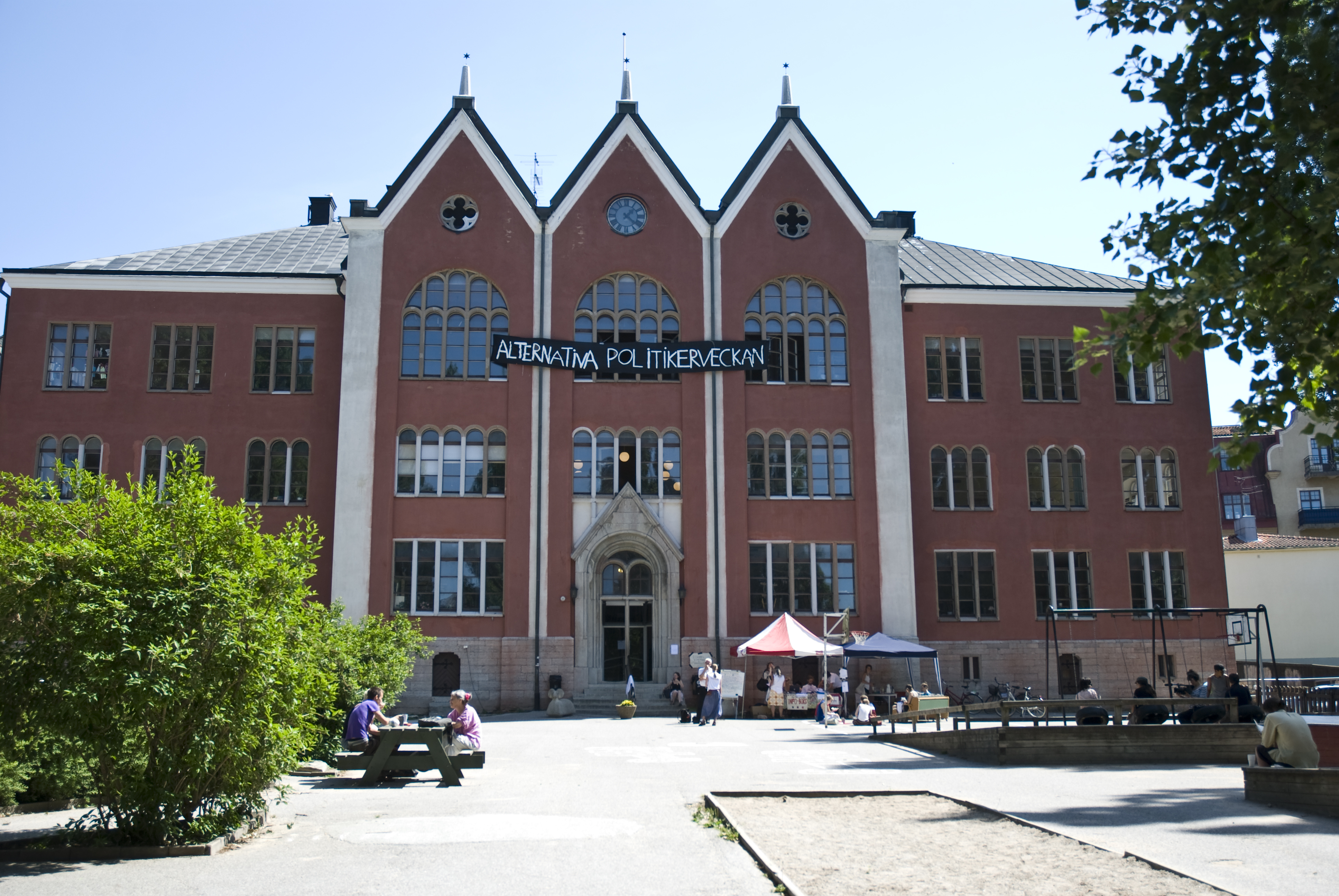
S:t Hans-skolan, Visby

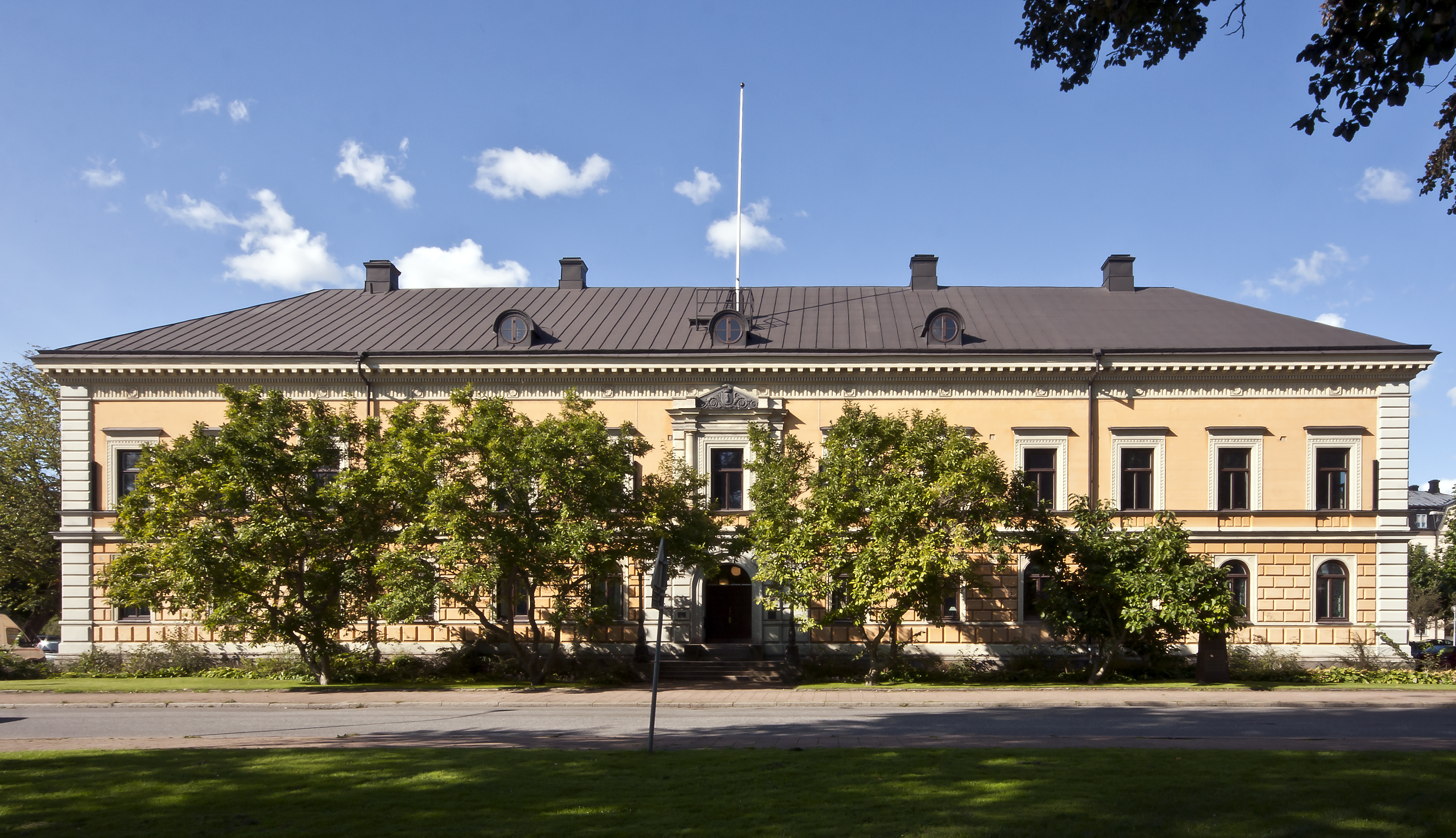
Länsresidenset, Kristianstad

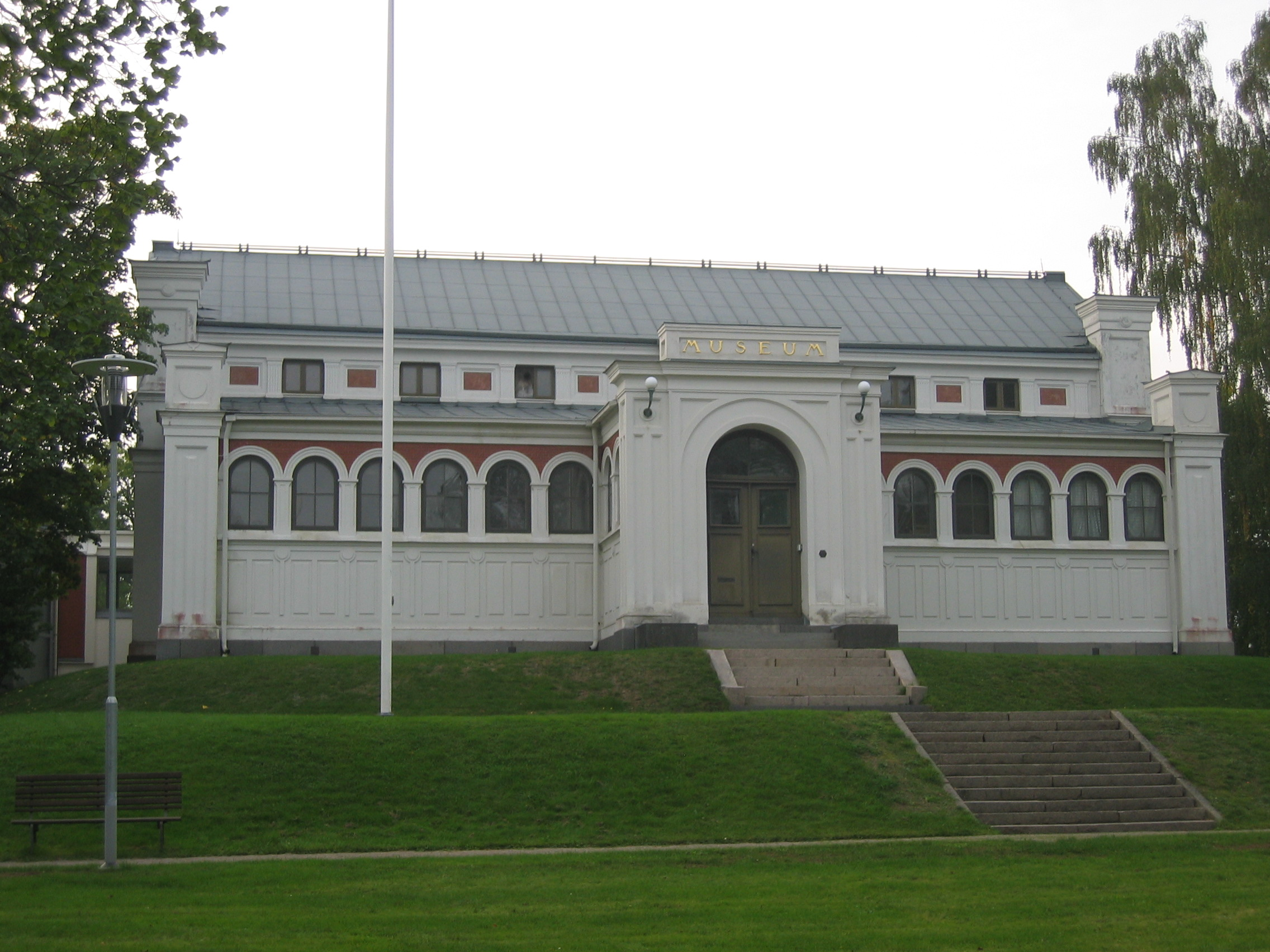
Småland Museum, Växjö

== See also ==
- Ödenäs Church
