= Ramkvilla =

Coordinates: 57°12′N 14°57′E

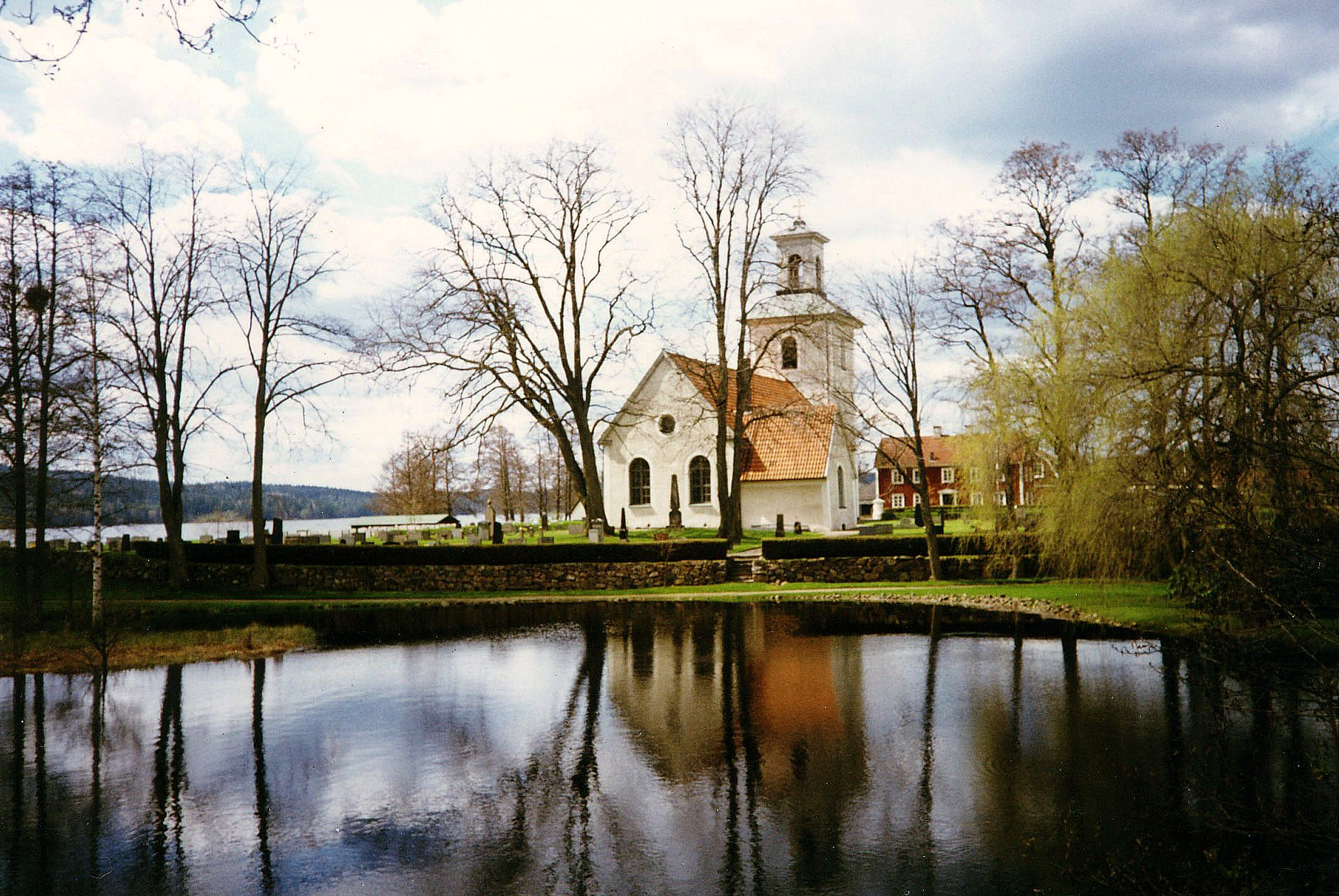
Ramkvilla 1

Ramkvilla (Swedish pronunciation: [ˈrâmːˌkvɪlːa]) is a small village south of Vetlanda in the southern Swedish province of Småland. Ramkvilla is situated by the lake Örken.
