= Åtorp =

- Urban settlement
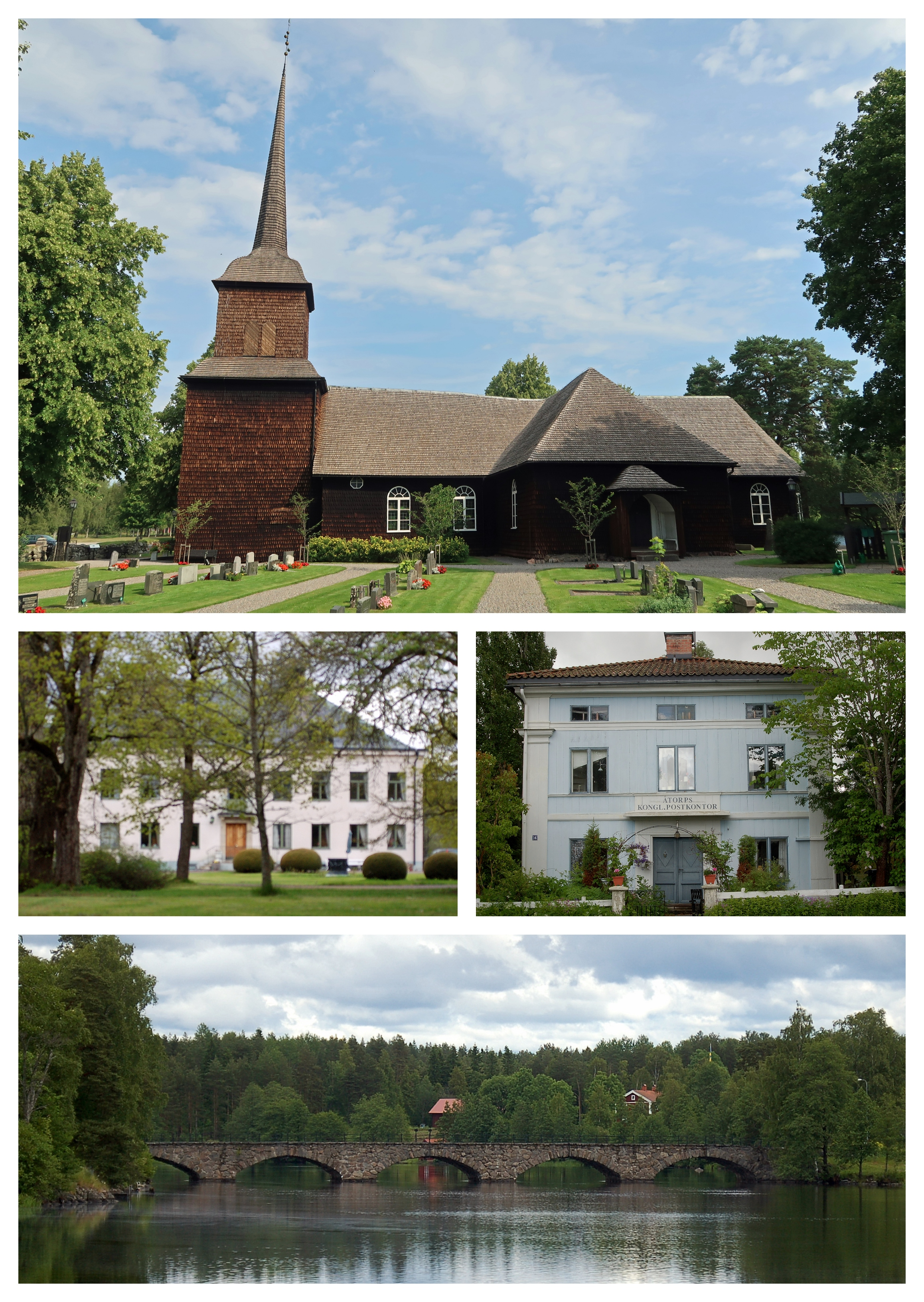

- Location within Örebro Location within Sweden
- Coordinates: 59°07′N 14°21′E
- Country: Sweden
- Province: Värmland and Närke
- County: Örebro County
- Municipality: Degerfors Municipality

Area
  - Total: 0.28 km^{2} (0.11 sq mi)

Population (31 December 2010)
  - Total: 212
  - Density: 752/km^{2} (1,950/sq mi)
- Time zone: UTC+1 (CET)
  - Summer (DST): UTC+2 (CEST)

Åtorp is a locality situated in Degerfors Municipality, Örebro County, Sweden with 212 inhabitants in 2010. The river that runs along Åtorp is called Letälven.
