= Algutsboda =

- Church village Former small town
- Interactive map of Algutsboda
- Coordinates: 56°43′25″N 15°34′55″E
- Country: Sweden
- County: Kalmar
- Municipality: Emmaboda
- District: Algutsboda District

Area
  - Total: 0.1 km^{2} (0.039 sq mi)

Population (1995)
  - Total: 62
  - Density: 620/km^{2} (1,600/sq mi)

Algutsboda is a community in Algutsboda District, Kalmar County, Sweden. Author Vilhelm Moberg (1898–1973) was born and grew up in Algutsboda, which is in the region called Småland.

In the mid-20th century, Algutsboda had a shop, bank, post office, telephone and telegraph station, school and municipal office. Today in the 21st century, in addition to private housing, only the church, the parish house, the retirement home and the local history museum remain. In the local history museum, old artifacts from the farming community have been preserved. Visitors can also see a collection of clothes and sewing.

== Sister cities ==
- (United States) Chisago City – Minnesota, US

== Images ==
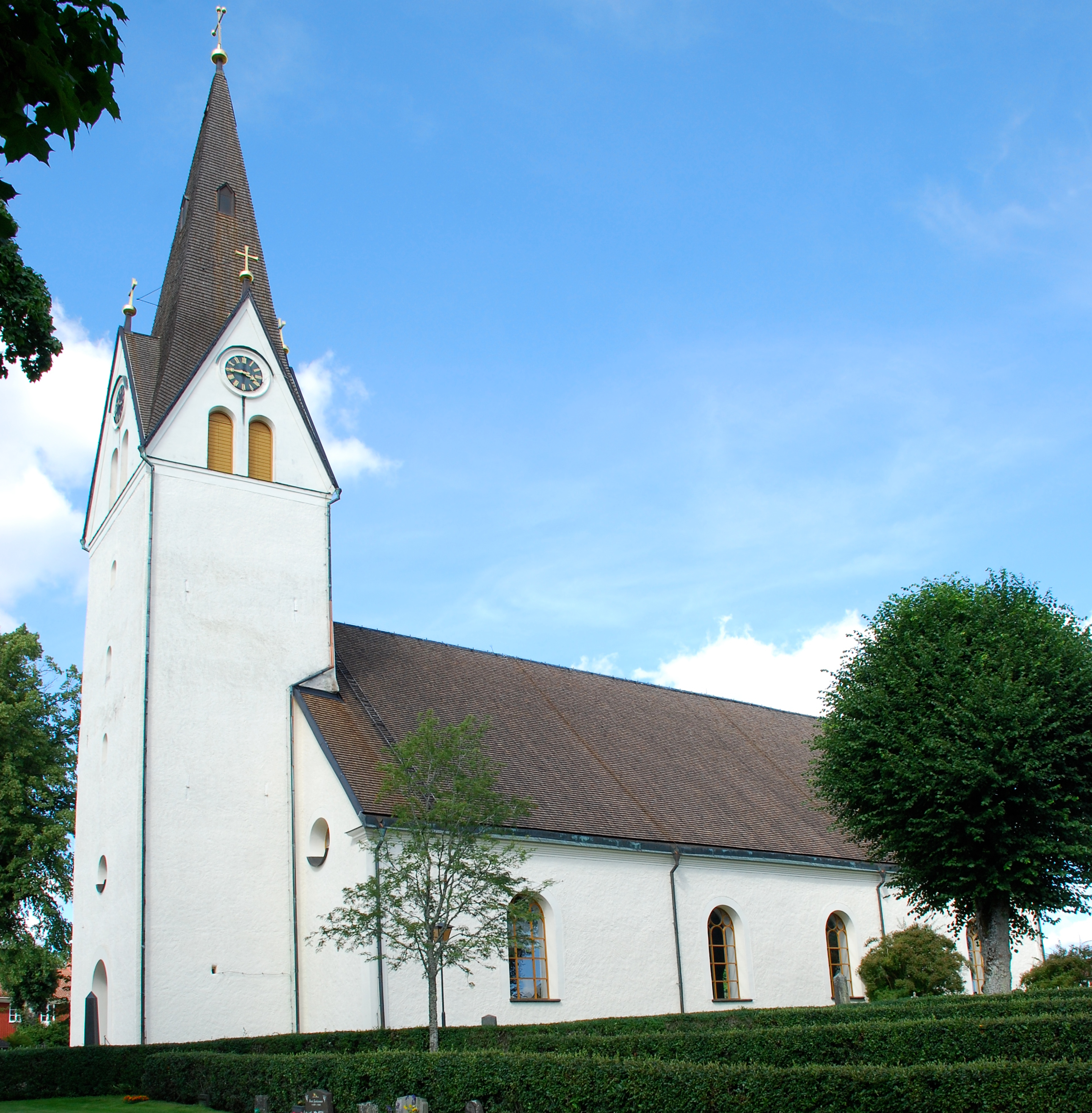
The church of Algutsboda

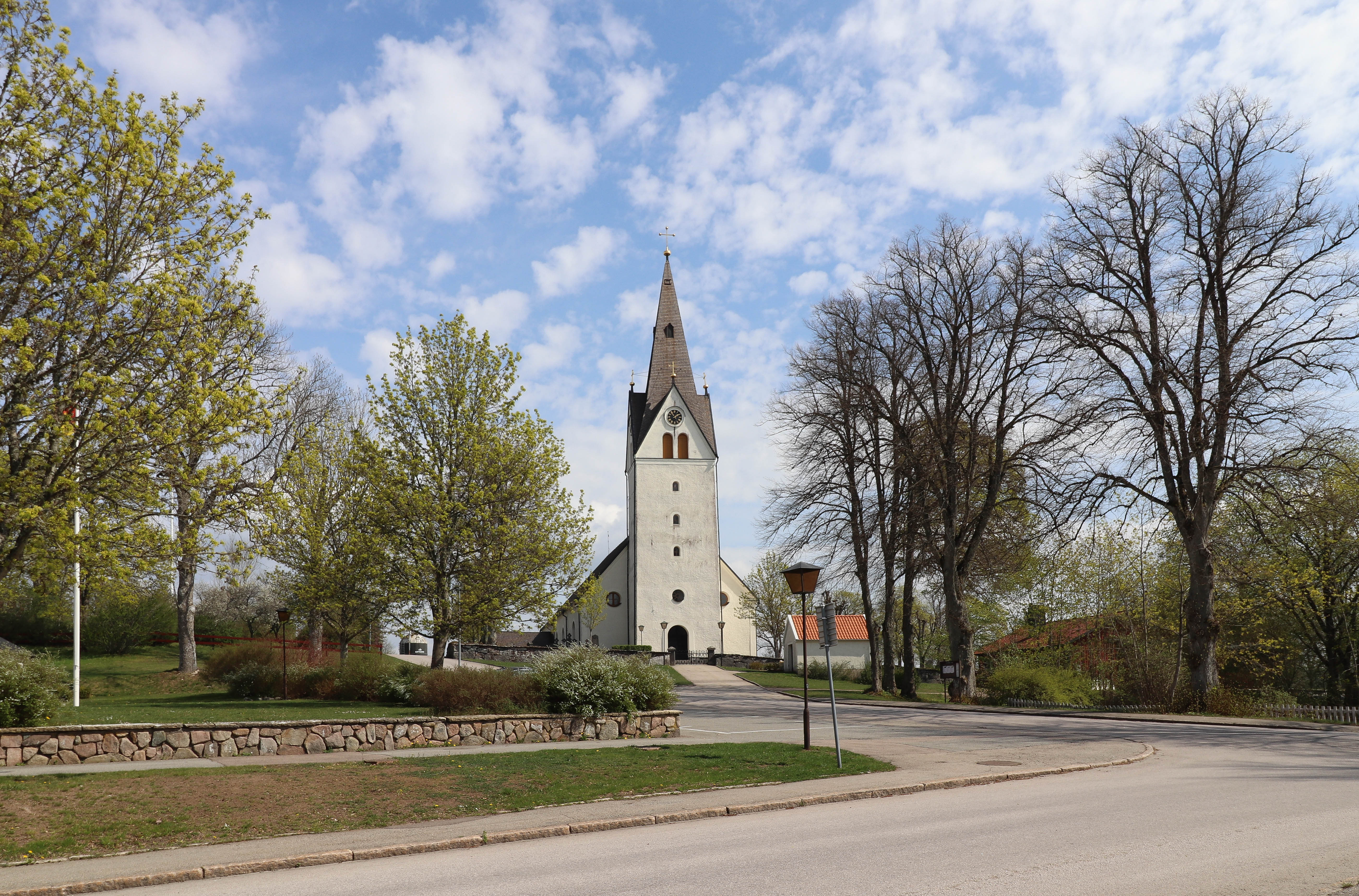
Kyrkbacken (Church Hill)

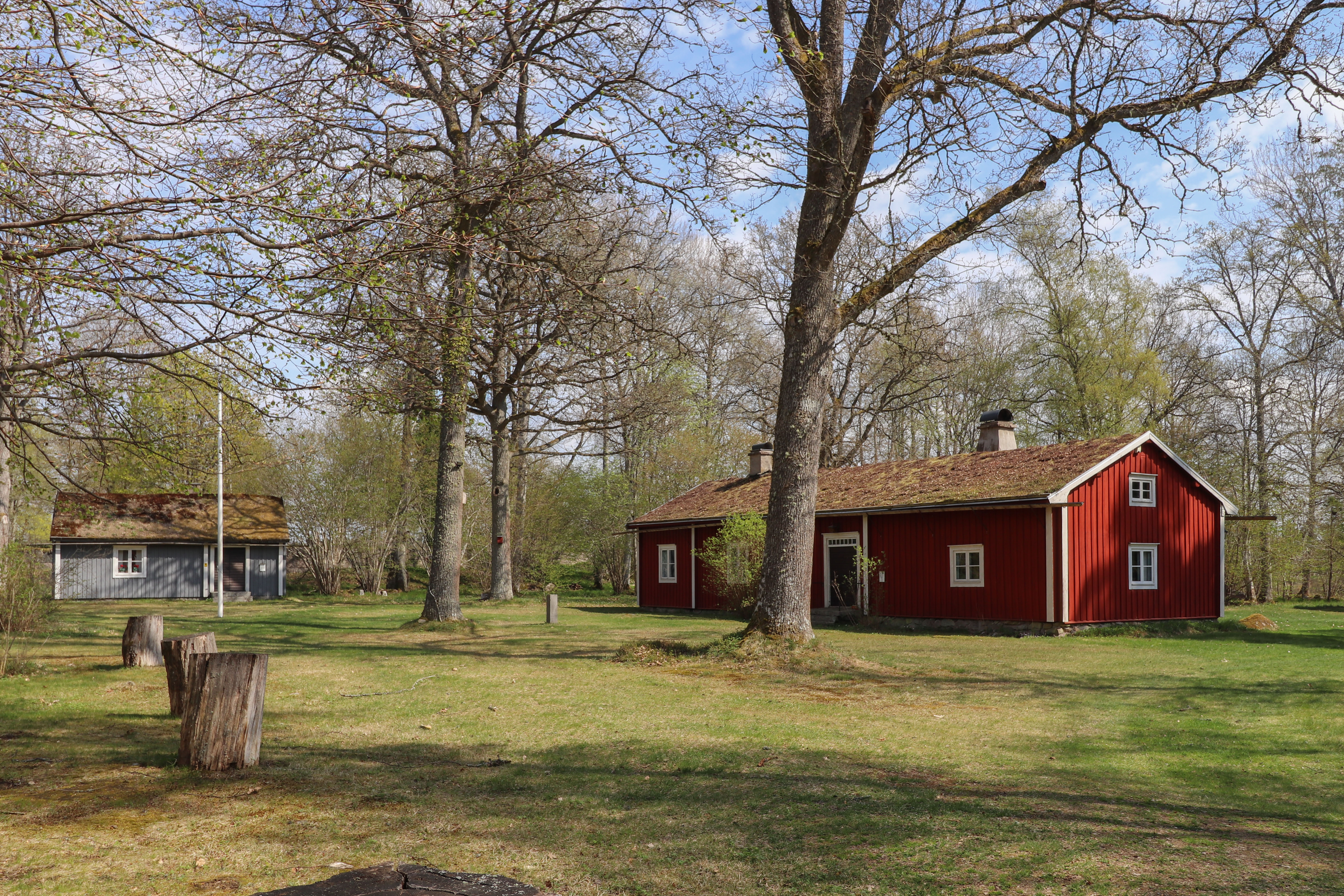
Algutsboda local history museum

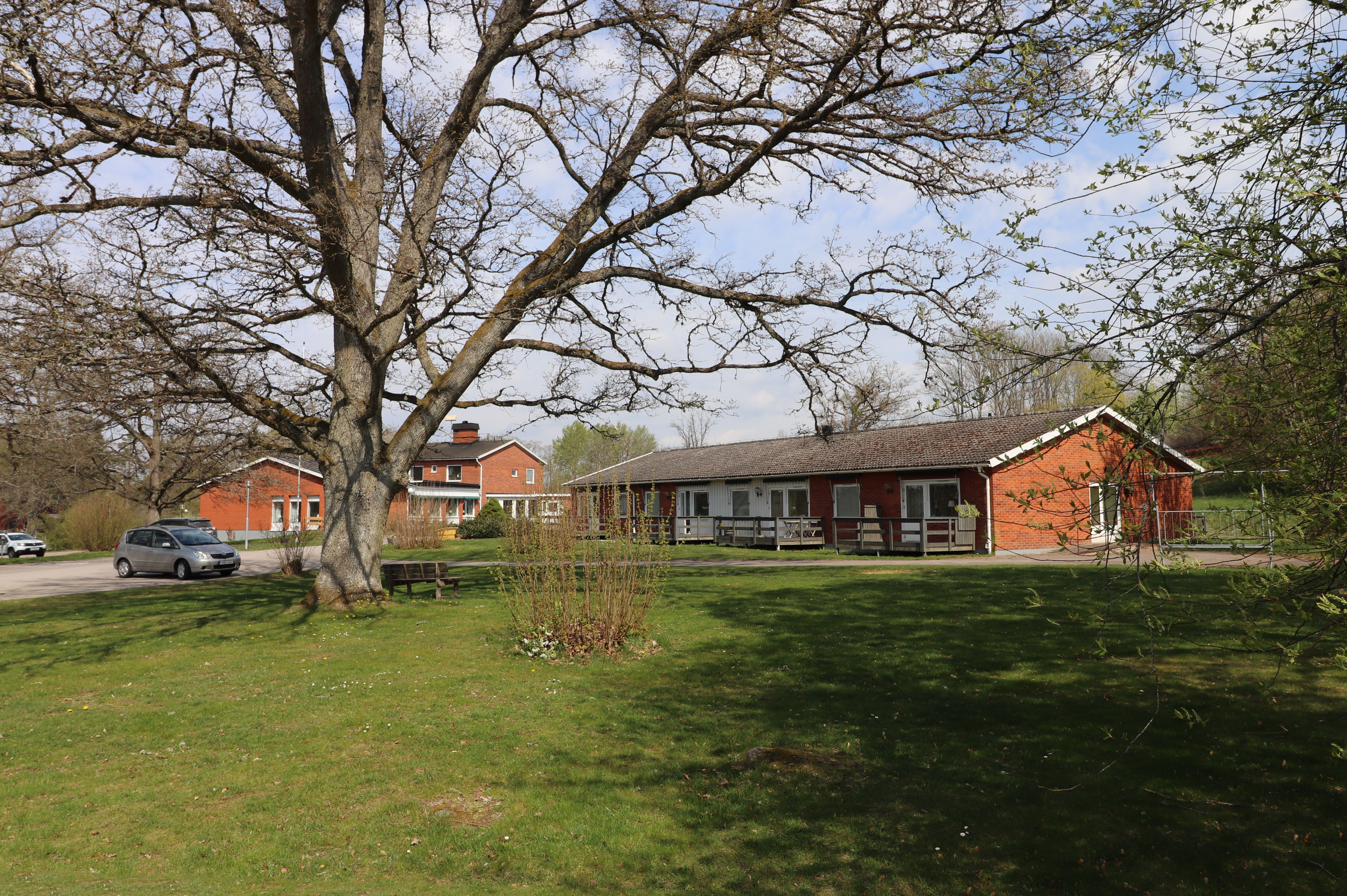
Alsboknuten community center

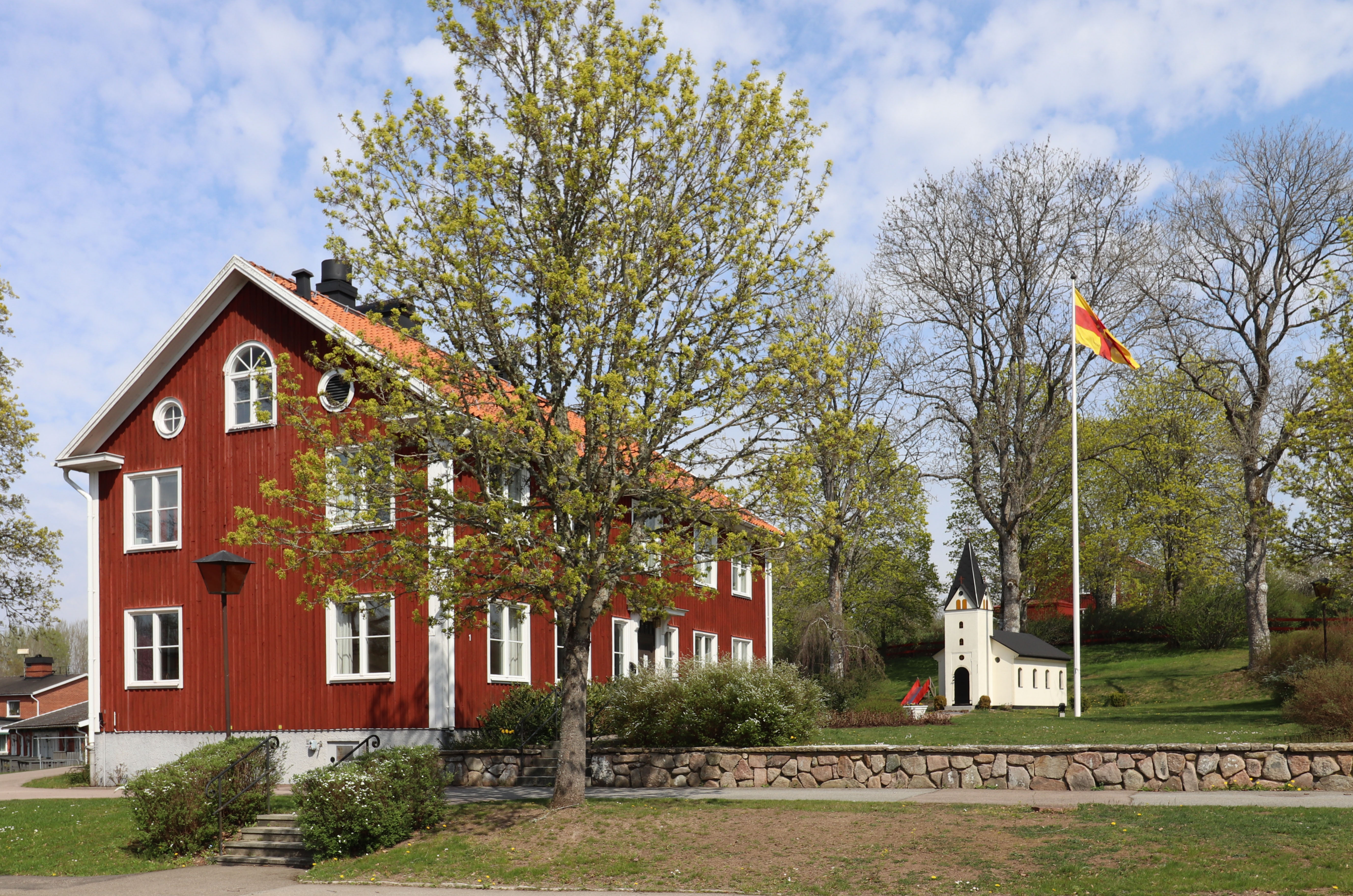
Parish house
