= Maja Sjöström =

Swedish artist (1868–1961)

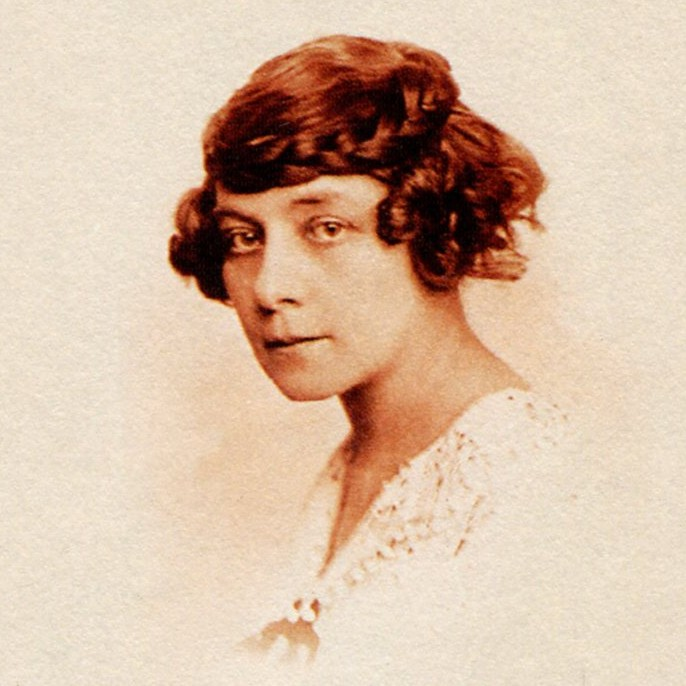
Maja Sjöström (1920s)

Maria (Maja) Sjöström (1868–1961) was a prominent Swedish textile artist from the 1890s to the 1930s. In particular, she designed intricate interior decorations for the new Stockholm City Hall. These included enormous silk tapestries which were woven at the Luigi Bevilacqua Textile Company in Venice. Following the opening of the city hall in 1923, Sjöström moved to Rome where she spent the rest of her life, ultimately in poverty, dismissed by the Swedes for her belief in Mussolini. Her reputation was however restored in the 2000s.

== Early life ==
Born on 13 March 1868 in Raus Parish, Helsingborg Municipality, Maja Sjöström was the daughter of Lars Sjöström and Amanda Landgren. She was brought up with her three sisters and three brothers in the bailiff's residence at Bårslöv. Despite the family's difficult financial conditions, she and her sisters went to school in nearby Helsingborg. In 1886, thanks to the support she received from Amanda Eriksson who worked in the statistics office, she was able to develop her interest in art at the arts and crafts school, Högre konstindustriella skolan. There she was introduced to the Friends of Handicraft (Handarbetets Vänner) establishment which, thanks to the designs she had produced, took her on in 1893. She soon became their leading designer, quickly gaining a reputation for her upholstery fabrics.

== Career ==
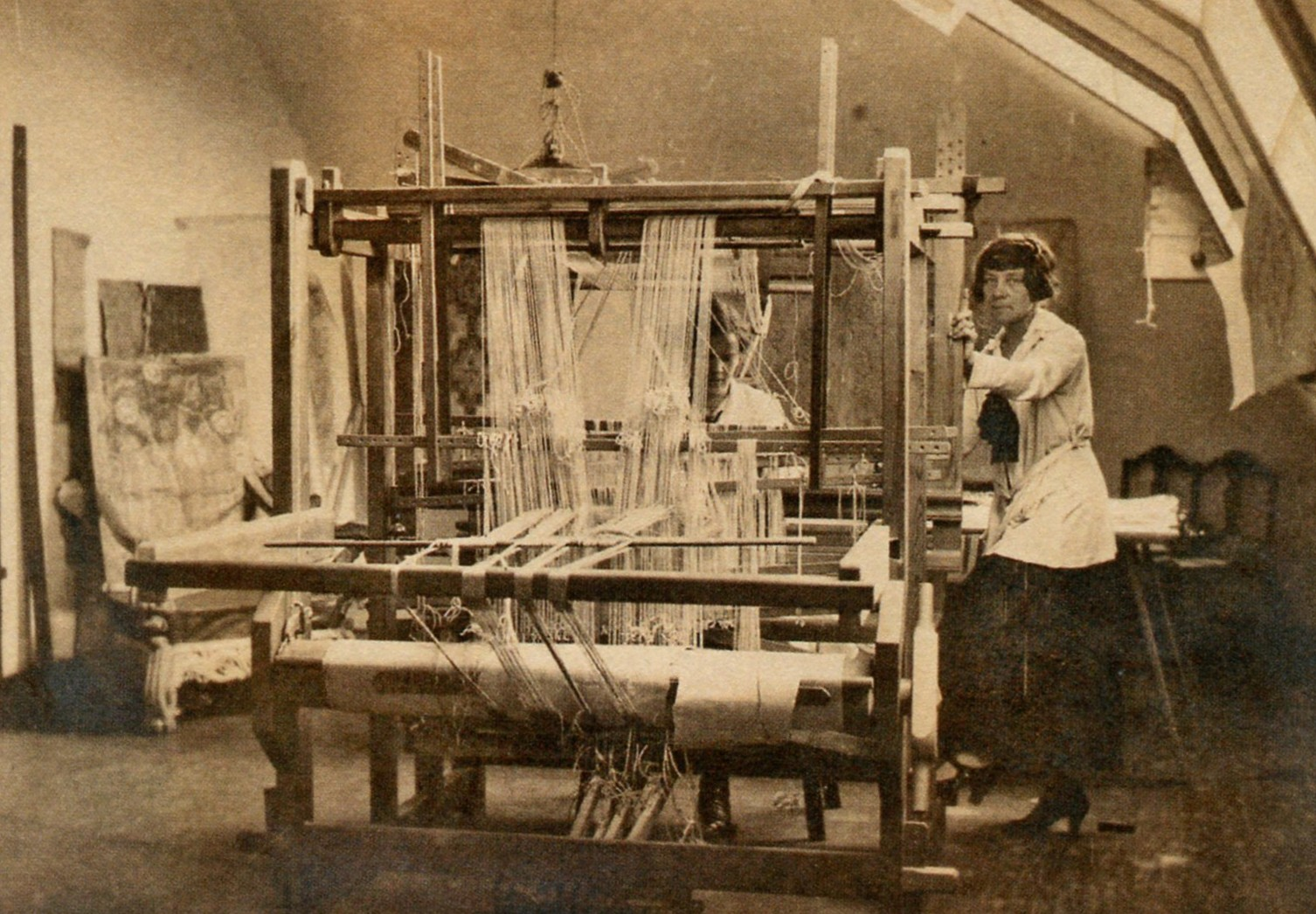
Maja Sjöström at work (1922)

Thanks to collaboration with the architect Carl Westman, in 1902 she designed textile decorations for Pressens Villa in Saltsjöbaden and received a commission to produce household textiles and a pile rug for Gösta Mittag-Leffler's library which received critical acclaim. In the early 1900s, she also produced textiles for churches.

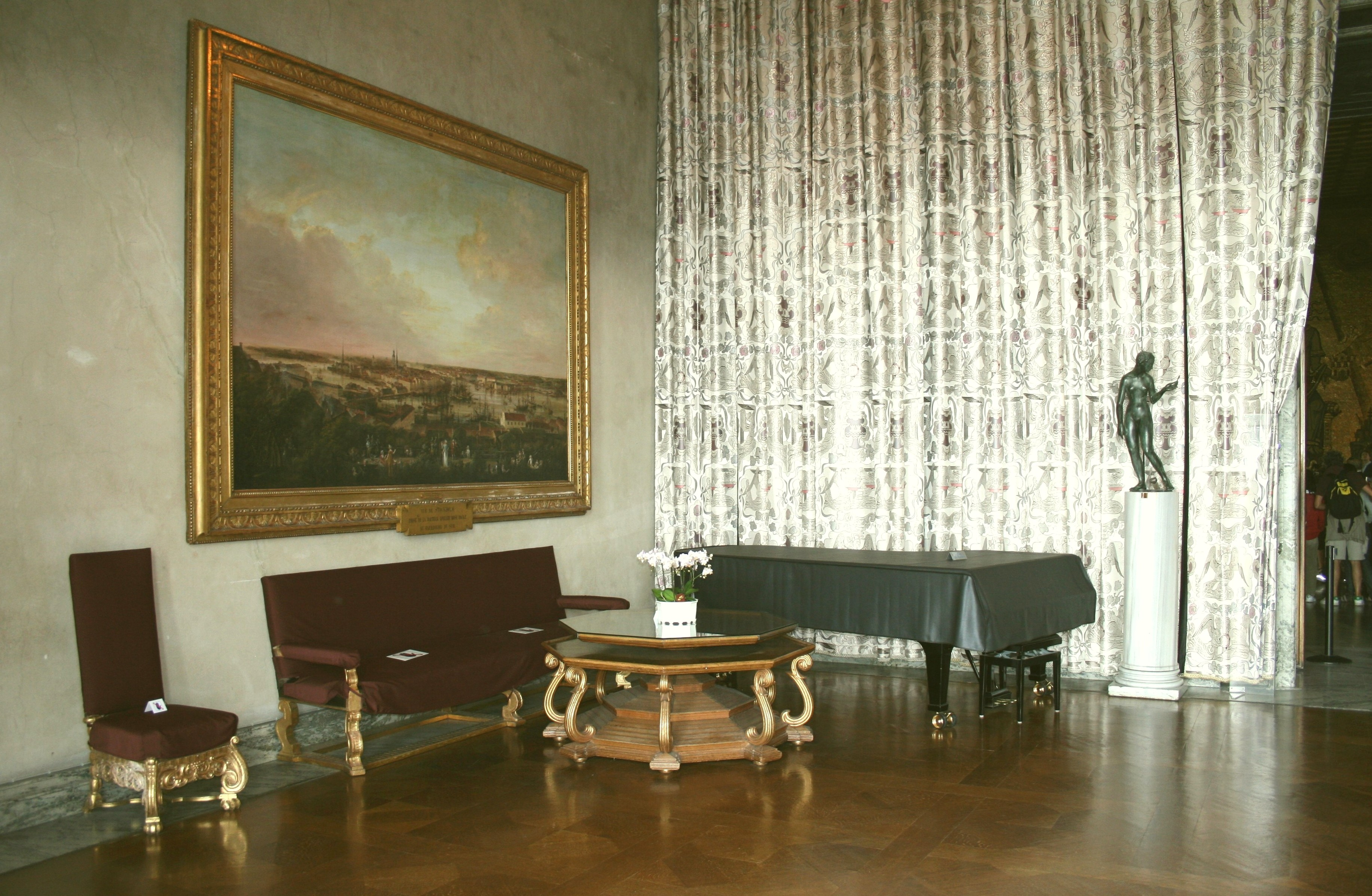
Sjöström's silks in Stockholm's City Hall

Further collaboration with Westman led to a commission for all the interior textile decorations for Stockholm's newly designed City Hall. This led to her spending two years in Venice at the Luigi Bevilacqua silk-weaving establishment where her large tapestry Festens genier (Angeli) and the silk works Hind och Örn (Cervo e Aquila) and Påfåglar (Pavoni) were produced. These works still decorate the Council Chamber and the Three Crowns Chamber.

After the opening of the City Hall in 1923, Sjöström moved to Rome, where she continued to design textiles in her studio. In addition, together with her three sisters she collaborated in operating the Blå Boden business near Helsingborg. She selected and dispatched art works from Italy, including those she had produced herself, for sale in Sweden. Initially the business prospered but interest fell off in the 1930s leading to closure in 1939.

Sjöström remained in Italy for the rest of her life. After the end of World War II, she lived in poverty in her bomb-damaged studio. Always a strong supporter of Mussolini, she was no longer accepted by the Scandinavian community. She died in Hamburg on 30 October 1961 while returning from Helsingborg to Rome. She is buried in Bårslöv.

Maja Sjöström remained forgotten until her designs were rediscovered at the beginning of the 21st century. Clothes and bags inspired by her drawings were sold in Italian fashion shops and by Hayward's of New York. She is now recognized as one of Sweden's most important textile artists.
