= Friends of Handicraft =

The Friends of Handicraft (Swedish: Handarbetets vänner) is a Swedish association for the education, development, production and experimentation of advanced textiles and design.

== History ==
The association was founded in 1874 by Sophie Adlersparre. From the outset, the association had the double aims of promoting the development of the quality of Swedish textile handicraft as well as to provide women with a source of independent income. The association also still has the pedagogical aim to provide education in textile creation and design.

In the 1880s, the association designed reform dress for the Swedish Dress Reform Association.

Wooden taboret with embroidered seat, fabric made by Friends of Handicraft, 1899. Hallwyl Museum, Sweden.

At the turn of the 19th – 20th century, Carin Wästberg, Maja Sjöström, Gunnar G:son Wennerberg and Alf Wallander were responsible for the artistic production of the association. Somewhat later, Anna Boberg, Carl Larsson and Anders Zorn were tied to the Friends of Handicraft, making designs for tapestries woven by the association. Several of the works produced during this early era are today in the collections of the Swedish National Museum in Stockholm. During the first years of activity, members of the association also traveled around Sweden, documenting traditional textile handicraft. In 1915 the Friends of Handicraft furthermore received funding from the Swedish state in order to provide education and training in weaving and textile handicraft for the first time.

During the 1930s and 1940s, the activities of the association were broadened and the Friends of Handicrafts began to produce textiles for furniture, curtains and carpets; during this time Alf Munthe was tied to the association. The association was led by Edna Martin between 1951 and 1977. During this time, the association developed and produced several large textile artworks, including two works for the Riksdag, the Swedish parliament. Artists Endre Nemes, Peter Dahl, Kaisa Melanton and Sten Kauppi all cooperated with the association during this period. In 1963, the until then private school was transformed into a state-owned school. In this period the first male students also began to study at the Friends of Handicraft's school (though education there was never formally reserved for women).

Since the 1990s, Siri Derkert, Lennart Rodhe and many other Swedish artists have cooperated with the association. Textile art from the Friends of Handicraft is today represented in e.g. Moderna Museet (i.e. the museum of modern art in Stockholm), Stockholm City Hall and the Headquarters of the United Nations.

== Activities ==
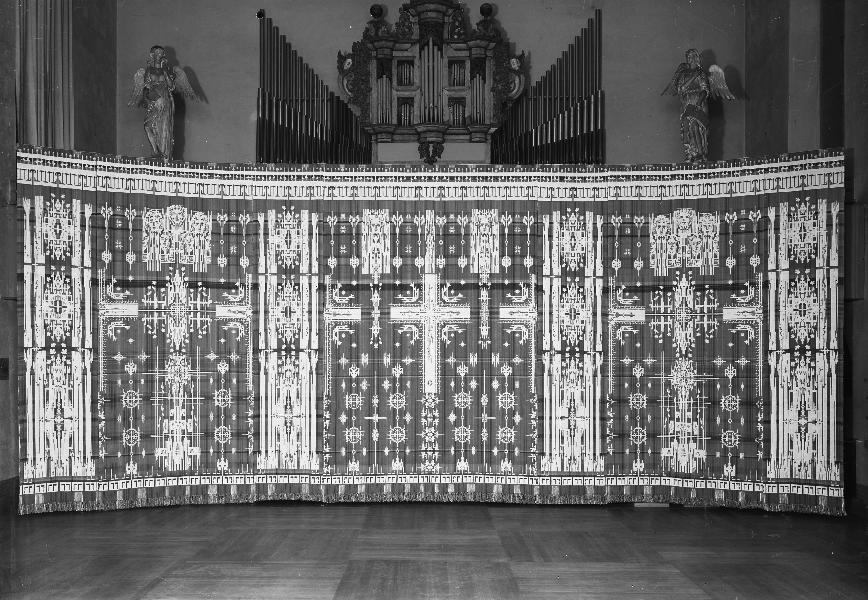
Tapestry made by Friends of Handicraft in Saint Birgittas Chapel, Skövde.

The Friends of Handicraft operates one of the few remaining artistic studios for textile art and, as noted above, cooperates closely with artists. The association provides textile artworks for public institutions and churches in Sweden, and furthermore still operates the school of advanced textile art and handicraft that was founded already in 1881 as a weaving school. It also operates an art gallery were the association displays textile art, located on Djurgården in Stockholm. The Friends of Handicrafts its overarching purpose as being an association "for the education, development, production and experimentation of advanced textiles and design."

== See also ==
- Friends of Finnish Handicraft
