= Lindholm (surname) =

Lindholm is a Swedish surname, meaning "Linden Islet". People with the surname include:

- Aarne Lindholm (1889–1972), Finnish long-distance runner
- Anna-Kari Lindholm (born 1976), Swedish curler
- Berit Lindholm (1934–2023), Swedish opera singer
- Berndt Lindholm (1841–1914), Finnish painter
- Brita Lindholm (born 1963), Swedish curler
- Charles Lindholm (born 1946), American anthropologist
- Elias Lindholm (born 1994), Swedish ice hockey forward
- Eric Lindholm (1890–1957), Swedish athlete
- Garrett Lindholm (born 1988), American footballer
- Gun-Mari Lindholm (born 1962), Ålandic politician
- Gunnar Lindholm (1887–1972), Swedish fencer
- Hampus Lindholm (born 1994), Swedish ice hockey defenceman
- Henna Lindholm (born 1989), Finnish ice dancer
- Inge Lindholm, (1892–1932), Swedish athlete
- Jan Lindholm (born 1951), Swedish Green Party politician
- Karl Lindholm (1860–1917), Russian sailor
- Kirsten Lindholm (born 1943), Danish actor
- Leila Lindholm (born 1975), Swedish chef
- Mathilda Lindholm (born 1995), Finnish badminton player
- Megan Lindholm (Robin Hobb) (born 1952), American writer
- Mikael Lindholm (born 1964), Swedish hockey player
- Olli Lindholm (born 1964), Finnish singer, also lead vocalist for Finnish band Yö
- Peja Lindholm (born 1970), Swedish curler
- Per Lindholm (born 1953), Swedish wrestler
- Philip Lindholm, American singer/songwriter, actor, filmmaker, and academic
- Raimo Lindholm (1931–2017), Finnish basketball player
- Robert M. Lindholm (1935–2019), American photographer
- Sebastian Lindholm (born 1961), Finnish rally driver
- Sven Olov Lindholm (1903–1998), Swedish Nazi leader
- Tobias Lindholm (born 1977), Danish screenwriter
- Tommy Lindholm (born 1947), Finnish footballer and coach
- Tyler Lindholm (born 1983), American politician
- Vasiliy Lindholm (1874–1935), Russian zoologist, malacologist and herpetologist
- Veronica Lindholm (born 1984), Swedish politician
