= Johan Jacob Ahrenberg =

Finnish architect and writer (1847–1914)

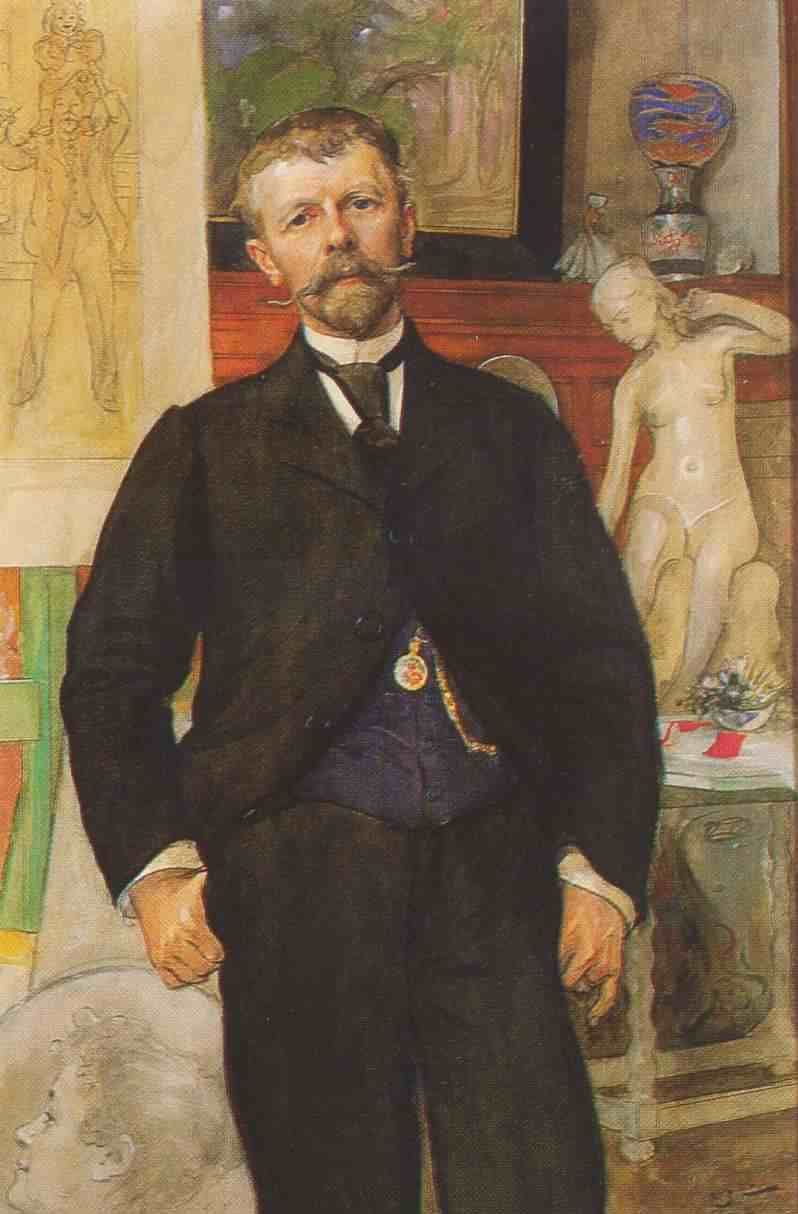
Jac Ahrenberg, portrait by Carl Larsson

Johan Jacob Ahrenberg, usually referred to as Jac (30 March 1847, in Vyborg – 10 October 1914, in Helsinki) was a Finnish architect, writer and artist. He designed a number of public buildings in Finland and is also remembered for his literary work which mainly deals with themes from contemporary everyday life in eastern Finland.

== Life ==
Ahrenberg came from a Swedish-speaking Finnish family from Viborg. His father was a school headmaster and his mother engaged in a Christian revival movement. Jac Ahrenberg studied architecture, inspired by his friend Theodor Höijer, for Fredrik Wilhelm Scholander at the Royal Institute of Art in Stockholm. After finishing his studies he continued through study journeys that would take him to Europe, through the Balkans and to North Africa.

Back in Finland he took up a position at a government agency overseeing the construction of public buildings in 1877. He made a successful career at the agency and received a new and higher appointment there as late as 1910. Early in his career he became involved in the preparations of Finland's contributions to the world fair in Paris in 1878 and another exposition in Copenhagen in 1888, together with Robert Runeberg and Julius af Lindfors. He thus got an opportunity to develop his talent not only as an architect but also as an artist and designer. He was a close friend of artist Fanny Churberg and associated with the Friends of Finnish Handicraft group (engaged in designing and making textiles) although he later largely parted ways with this group. In 1885 he was responsible for the planning of the visit to Lappeenranta by Emperor Alexander III for a military exercise and also supplied the designs for the interior of a fishing cabin that was given as a gift to the Emperor. Ahrensberg's background in multicultural Vyborg and skill in languages may have made him appear suitable for jobs related to the Russian authorities (Finland was at the time an autonomous part of the Russian Empire).

Ahrenberg had published his first literary work in 1870 and continued writing all his life. Apart from books he also contributed to newspapers and magazines.

In 1876 he married the artist Widolfa von Engeström. The couple had two sons and three daughters, Carl Gaston, Helge Edmund René, Signe Blanche Maria (Tandefelt), Märta Matilda Beatrice (Hertz) and Helga Cecilia Geneviéve (Franck). Franck's son Kaj Franck became a well-known Finnish designer.

== Architecture ==
In his official capacity Jac Ahrenberg was responsible for providing designs for public buildings, notably schools and churches. Hanko Church (1892), Kajaani Church (1896) and the Reserve Officer School in Hamina (1898) have been mentioned as some of his most accomplished work. As an architect, Ahrenberg was an eclectic on a classical foundation. He was one of the first architects in Finland who recognised the need for a systematic approach to building conservation even though he later received criticism for his somewhat schematic approach to the subject. In architecture he had a cosmopolitan outlook and was an admirer of Swedish culture, somewhat in opposition to National Romantic ideas of his time.

== Design and art ==
For the expositions in 1878 and 1888, Ahrenberg designed furniture and textiles and worked in a style that adhered to a pronounced European tradition but with details that were considered markedly Finnish. He later distanced himself from outspoken nationalistic ideals in design and adhered to the liberal ideas of art theorist Carl Gustaf Estlander. He was also an active painter throughout his life.

== Literature ==
Ahrenberg wrote in Swedish but was translated to Finnish as well as other languages. He produced a number of novels and short stories set in eastern Finland which became popular. They deal with everyday life in the region, e.g. the short story collections Hemma ("At home", 1887) and Österut ("Eastwards", 1890). His novel Stockjunkarn (1892) relates the story of the demise of a trading company in Viborg and has been described as the artistically most accomplished novel by Ahrenberg. Other novels that have been described as particularly noteworthy are Familjen på Haapakoski ("The family at Haapakoski", 1893) and Vår landsman ("Our countryman", 1897), in which he describes the life of russified Finnish officers and their families. He also published his memoirs in six volumes, Människor jag känt, in which he relates lively anecdotes about many well-known people of his time whom he knew personally, e.g. Heinrich Schliemann, Vasily Vereshchagin, Ivan Turgenev, Viktor Rydberg, Charles Garnier and Arthur de Gobineau; the racist ideas of the latter influenced Ahrenberg to a certain degree. Overall, his literary production has been described as a skilled but somewhat uneven writer and his books "did not become classics".

== Examples of buildings designed by Ahrenberg ==
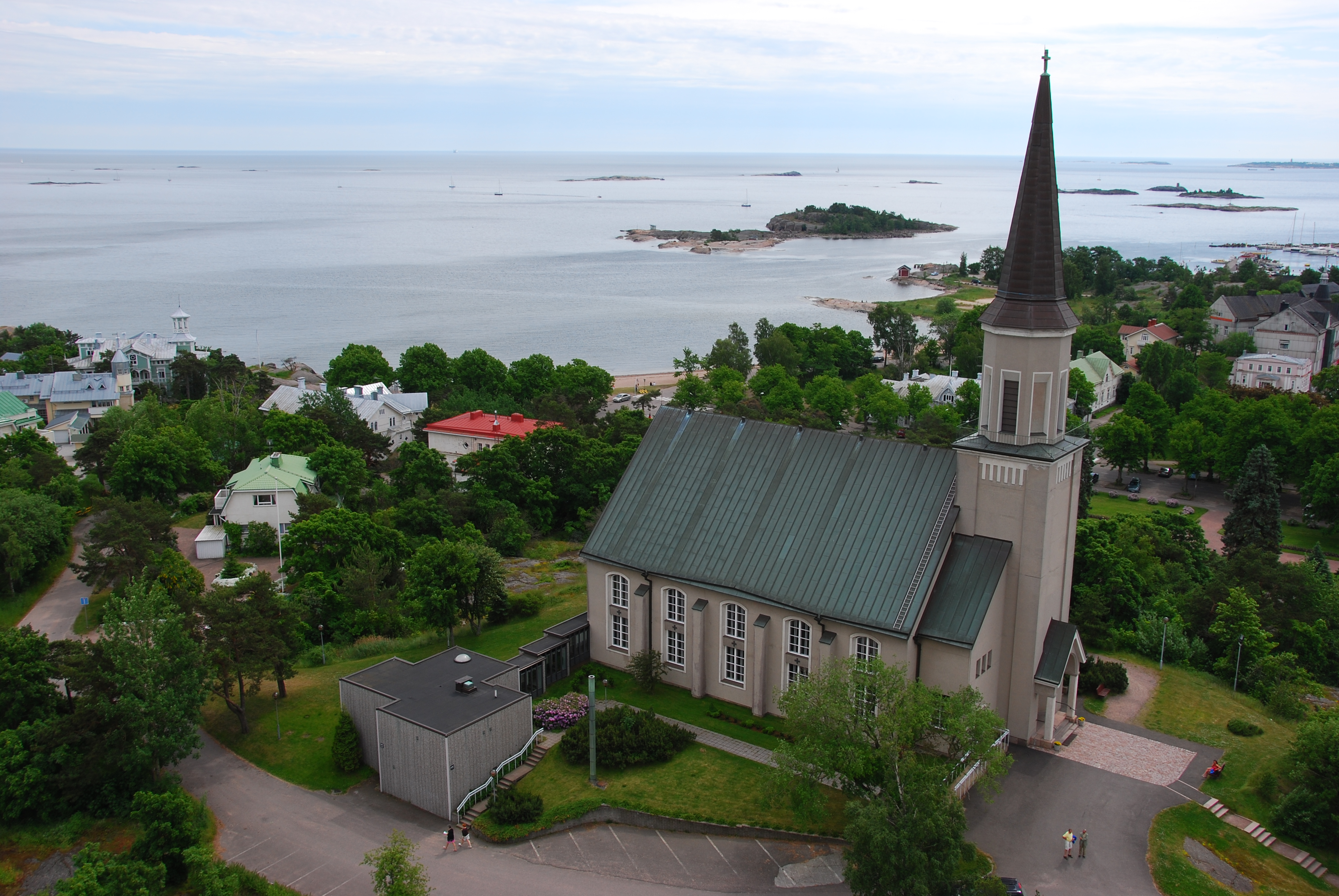
Hanko Church (1892)

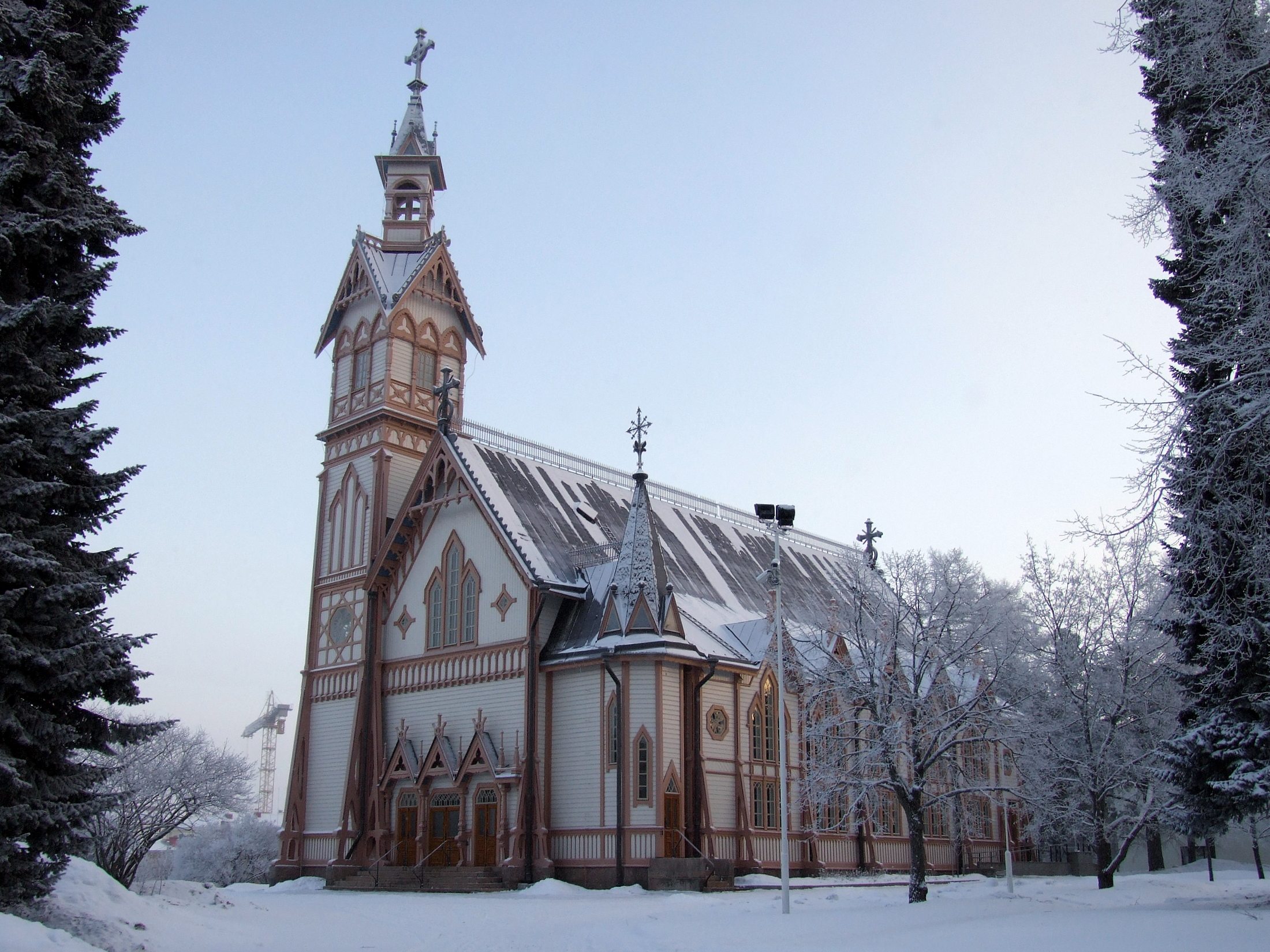
Kajaani Church (1896)

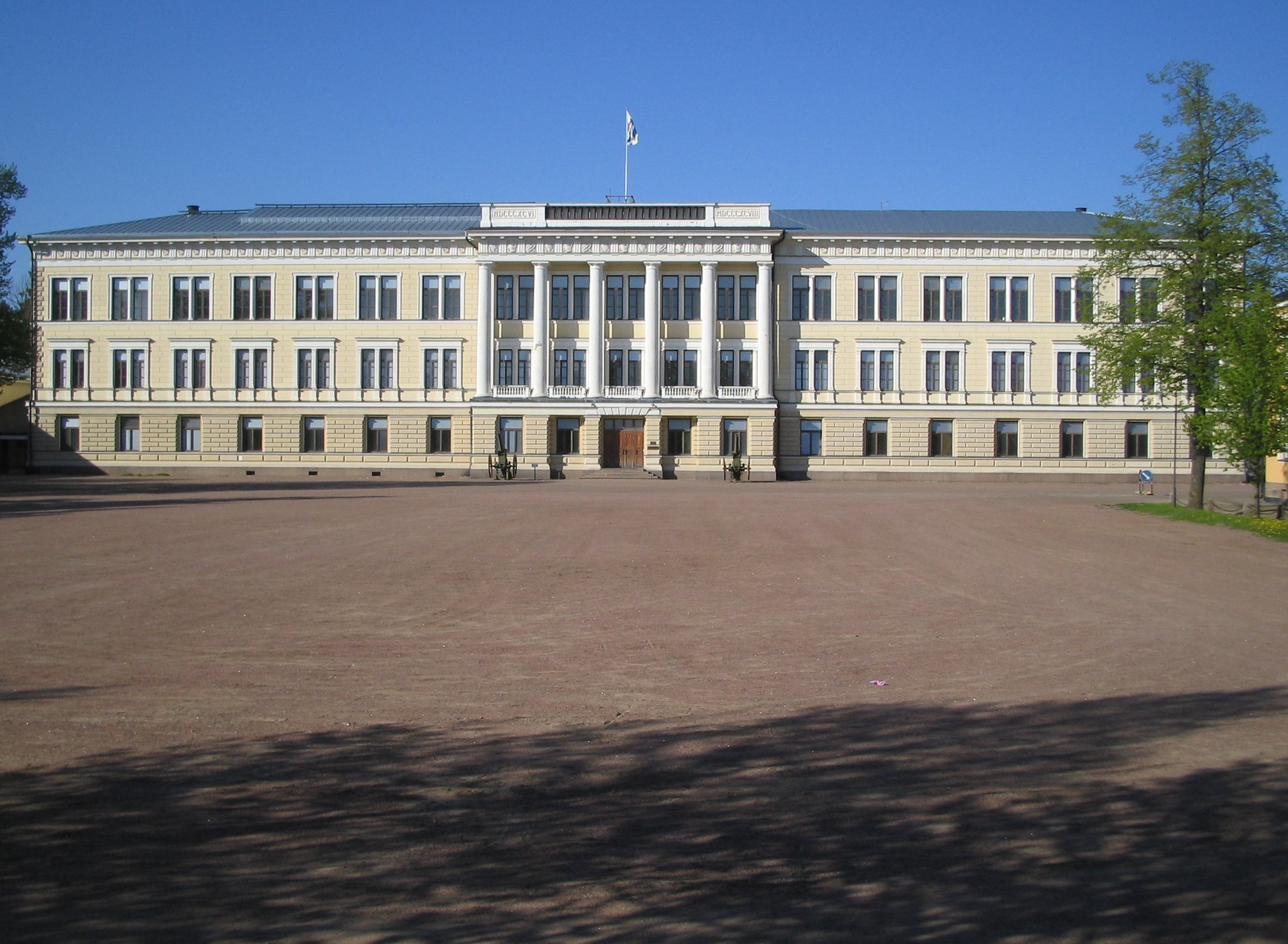
Reserve Officer School in Hamina (1898)
