= Friends of Finnish Handicraft =

The Friends of Finnish Handicraft (Finnish: Suomen käsityön ystävät, Swedish: Finska handarbetets vänner) is a Finnish association for the promotion and creation of textile art.

== History and activity ==
The association was founded in 1879 by Fanny Churberg and inspired by the Swedish Friends of Handicraft association which was founded five years earlier. The association has always worked closely with artists and architects and from an early date cooperated with e.g. Jac Ahrenberg. The purpose of the Friends of Finnish Handicraft is to document and promote typically Finnish textiles. In its early days the association collected and published a pattern book of traditional textile patterns. Today the association is known for products which it supplies for public spaces and distributes through a shop in Ulvila. The association produces among other things rya rugs, church textiles, and embroidered cushions.
