= Lindholm =

Lindholm may refer to:

== Surname ==
- Lindholm (surname)

== Places ==
- Lindholm, Aalborg, a district of Nørresundby, Denmark
- Lindholm (Stege Bugt), an island in Vordingborg Municipality, Denmark
- Lindholm Strait, a strait in the Sea of Okhotsk
- Risum-Lindholm, a district in Nordfriesland, Germany

== Other uses ==
- Lindholm (manor house), a historic estate in Lejre Municipality, Denmark
- Lindholm Høje, major Viking burial site in Denmark
- Lindholm IF, a Danish football club
- Lindholm amulet, bone piece found in Skåne, Sweden
- Lindholm station, a railway station in Nørresundby, Denmark
- R. W. Lindholm Service Station in Cloquet, Minnesota, Listed in the U.S. National Register of Historic Places

== See also ==
- Lindholme (disambiguation)
- Lindholmen (disambiguation)
- Lindholmiola, a genus of land snails
