= Einar Forseth =

Swedish artist (1892–1988)

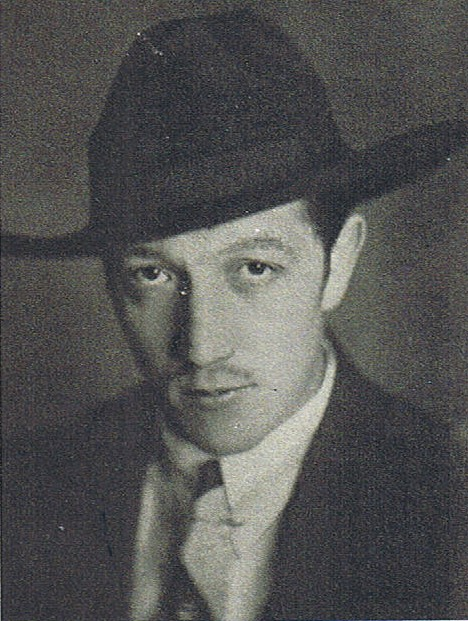
Einar Forseth

Carl Einar Andreas Forseth (1892–1988) was a Swedish artist, remembered above all for his mosaics in the Golden Hall in Stockholm City Hall completed in 1923.

== Early life ==
Born in Linköping, Forseth was the son of the Norwegian lithographer Ole Andreas Forseth. He was raised in Örebro where his father ran a lithographic business. In 1905 the family moved to Gothenburg where he attended the Arts and Crafts School (Slöjdföreningens Skola) studying under Gunnar Hallström, Anders Trulsson and Charles Lindholm. He completed his education at the Royal Swedish Academy of Arts in Stockholm (1912–1915) under Olle Hjortzberg and Oscar Björck.

== Biography ==
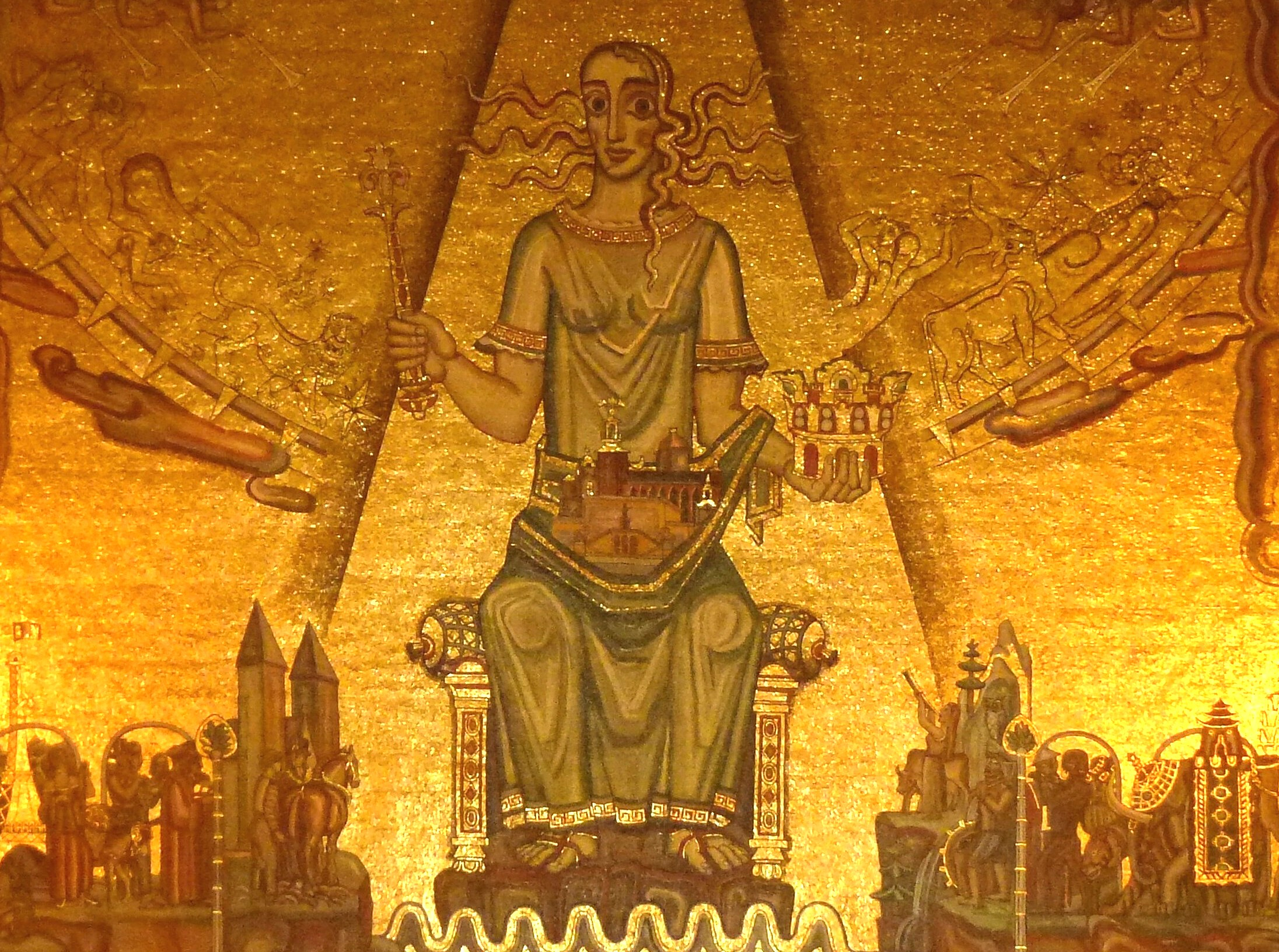
Mälar Queen, Golden Hall, Stockholm

During his travels to Istanbul, Greece and Italy, he developed an interest in monumental and decorative art which extended to frescos, textiles and oil paintings. From 1921 to 1923 he decorated the Golden Hall in Stockholm's City Hall with mosaics in the Byzantine style, creating the Mälar Queen as the central figure.

Examples of his stained glass creations can be seen in St Mary's Church, Helsingborg (1937), Sankt Nicolai, Halmstad (1937), St Peter and St Sigfrid's Church, Stockholm, and Coventry Cathedral, for which he also created floor mosaics in 1962. He also contributed designs to Lidköping's porcelain factory.

He was awarded the Prince Eugen Medal in 1963.

== Literature ==
- Böhn-Jullander, Ingrid; Forseth, Einar (1982). Einar Forseth: En bok om en konstnär och hans verk. Stockholms kommun. ISBN 978-91-38-72574-0.
- Stavenow, Åke Ludvig; Forseth, Einar; Odhe, Thorsten (1956). Einar Forseth: Swedish Painter. (Translated from the Swedish by Thorsten Odhe.) [With Reproductions and Portraits.]. Allhems Förlag.
