= Lindholmen =

Lindholmen may refer to:

== Places ==
- Lindholmen, Gothenburg, a district on the island of Hisingen, Sweden
- Lindholmen, Karlskrona, an island south of Karlskrona, Sweden
- Lindholmen, Vallentuna, a locality in Stockholm County, Sweden

== Other uses ==
- Lindholmen Castle, Scania, Sweden
- Lindholmen Castle, Västergötland, Sweden
- Lindholmen Castle (Gothenburg), Sweden
- Lindholmens or Lindholmen varv, a Swedish shipyard in Gothenburg

== See also ==
- Lindholm (disambiguation)
- Lindholme (disambiguation)
