= Lindholme =

Lindholme may refer to:-

- Lindholme, South Yorkshire, in the Metropolitan Borough of Doncaster, England
  - RAF Lindholme, a World War II bomber station
  - HM Prison Lindholme, a prison and Immigrant Removal Centre on the site of the former RAF Lindholme

== See also ==
- Lindholm (disambiguation)
- Lindholmen (disambiguation)
- Lindholme Gear, a type of air sea rescue apparatus
