= Leila Lindholm =

Swedish chef

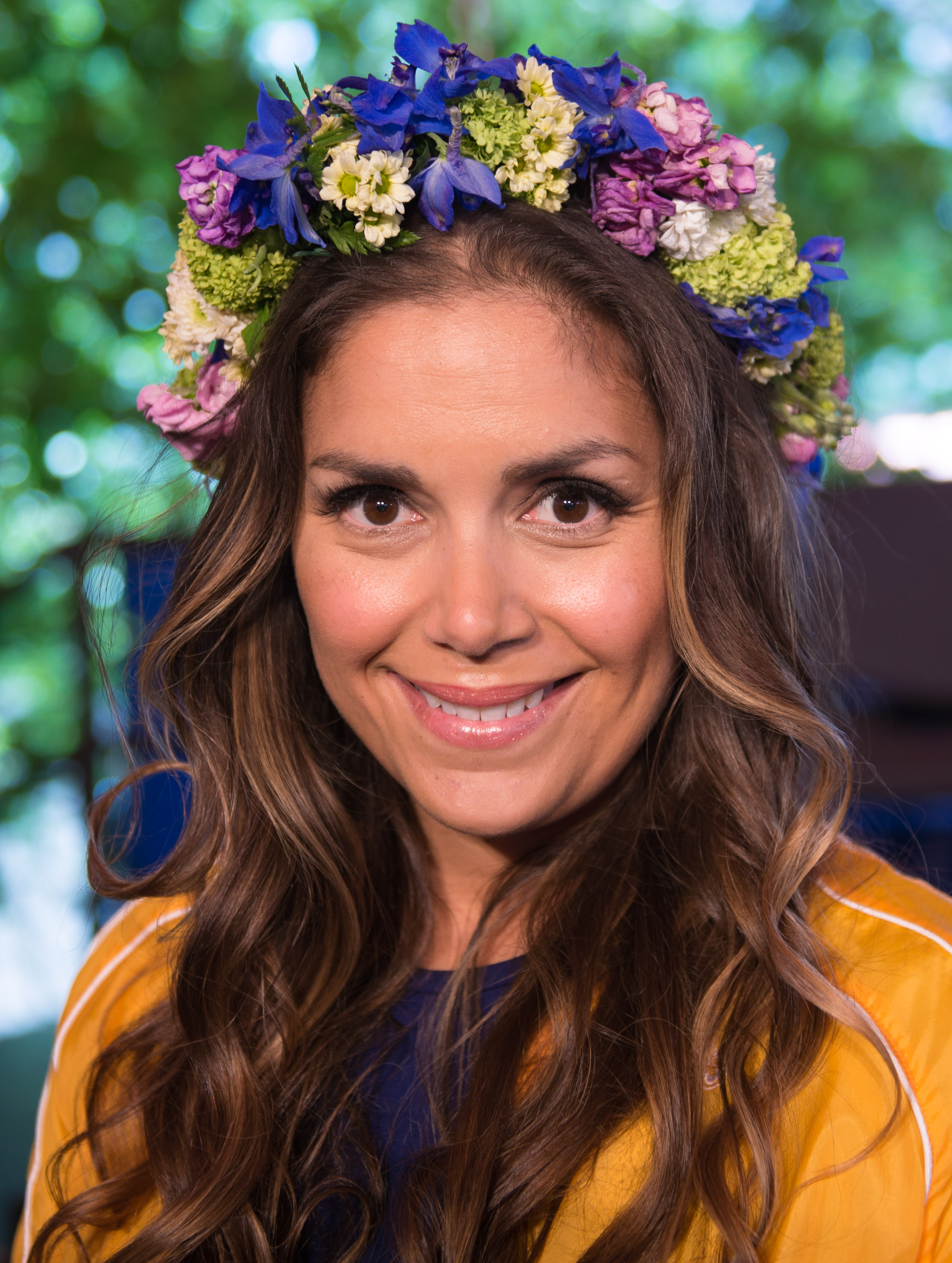
- Leila Lindholm in June 2015
- Born: 21 June 1975 (age 49); Stockholm, Sweden
- Occupation: Chef

Leila Mariana Johanna Lindholm (born 21 June 1975) is a Swedish chef. She is known for being a presenter for the cooking shows Leilas mat, Leila bakar, Leila på landet, Leilas jul, Leilas home delivery, Leila bakar i Frankrike and Leilas söta jul, which are all broadcast on Sjuan. Leilas father is Moroccan and her mother is Swedish.

At the age of fourteen she decided that she wanted to be a chef and started at a restaurant education. She has since finishing her education worked for restaurants like Operakällaren in Stockholm and Aquavit in New York City. Leila also runs the book publishing company Walter and Books. Throughout the years Lindholm has won several awards such as Woman Chef of the Year in 1999, TV4 Chef of the Year in 2004, several nominations at Gourmand Cookbook Awards. Lindholm's book publishing company has also won the Svenska Publishing priset for her first cookbook, One more slice. In 2004 Lindholm participated in the celebrity game show Fort Boyard (Sv: Fångarna på fortet) which was broadcast on TV4.

== Bibliography ==
- Lindholm, Leila (2011). Hello cupcake!. Stockholm: Walter and books. ISBN 978-91-978599-1-2
- Lindholm, Leila (2010). Leilas one more slice: [surdegsbröd, pizza, pasta och söta bakverk]. Stockholm: Walter and books. Libris 11764871. ISBN 978-91-978599-0-5 (inb.)
- Lindholm, Leila (2008). A piece of cake: [Leilas favoritbröd och bakverk]. Stockholm: Natur & Kultur. Libris 10573739. ISBN 978-91-27-11600-9 (inb.)
- Lindholm, Leila (2006). Leilas guldkant på vardagen. Stockholm: Natur & Kultur. Libris 10084921. ISBN 91-27-35707-4
- Lindholm, Leila (2006). Leilas middagstips ([Ny utg.]). Stockholm: Natur & Kultur/Fakta etc. i samarbete med TV4. Libris 10243063. ISBN 91-27-02625-6
