= Charles Lindholm =

American sociologist and philosopher

- Born: 1946
- Died: June 30, 2023 (aged 76–77)
- Spouse: Cherry Lindholm

Academic background
- Education: Columbia University (BA, MA, PhD)

Academic work
- Discipline: Anthropology
- Institutions: Columbia University; Harvard University; Boston University

Charles Lindholm (1946–June 30, 2023) was the University Professor of Anthropology at Boston University. He was the author of nine books and over seventy articles and reviews. His writings have been translated into Spanish, Turkish, Chinese, Arabic, and Portuguese.

At his death, he was described as “an inspired teacher and an unsurpassed mentor,” and a “pioneer in the anthropology of emotion.”

== Family, education and work history ==
Lindholm was born in 1946 in Mankato, Minnesota, the son of a civil servant. He attended East Denver High School. After receiving his undergraduate degree from Columbia College in 1968 he spent the next several years traveling in Afghanistan, Pakistan, India, Sri Lanka, and the West Indies. He met his wife Cherry in Jamaica in 1972 and in 1973 won a scholarship to study anthropology at Columbia. In 1977, Cherry and her daughter Michelle accompanied him on his fieldwork with the Swat Pukhtun in Northern Pakistan. He earned his doctorate in 1979 and taught at Columbia and Barnard until 1983. He then held a joint appointment in the Committee on Social Studies and the Department of Anthropology at Harvard, where he remained until 1990. Subsequently, he was the University Professor of Anthropology at Boston University.

== Research ==
Lindholm's research uses detailed case studies to extend, test, and integrate sociological and psychological theory. His first book, Generosity and Jealousy (1982) was based on his original research in Swat. In it, he argued that the constricted patrilineal social structure of Swati society, coupled with scarcity of resources, impelled its members toward relationships of rivalry and antagonism. However, this hostility was balanced by an ethic of ritualized hospitality and by an idealization of friendship. These were said to be symbolic and psychic manifestations of fundamental inclinations to attachment that were precluded by the objective circumstances of the larger system.

His next book, Charisma (1990), synthesized a wide range of theory in order to construct a base for the study of idealization. This base was then applied to the Hitler movement, the Manson Family, the Jim Jones cult, and shamanistic religions. Among other things, the book showed that modern charismatic collectives are more compelling and encompassing, as well as more distorted and destructive, under contemporary circumstances of alienation than was the case in premodern social systems. He returned to this topic in the volume he edited in 2013 entitled The Anthropology of Religious Charisma: Ecstasies and Institutions.

He also published several articles comparing the structure and experience of romantic love with that of charisma, arguing for a more culturally nuanced view of romantic idealization as a specific cultural form of the human search for transcendence, rather than simply a disguise for a genetically programmed mating strategy. In his textbook Culture and Identity (2007) Lindholm expanded his approach to develop a multi-dimensional psychological anthropology based on the dialectical interpenetration of three levels of human experience: the personal/psychic level best grasped through a modified version of psychoanalysis; the institutional/structural level best understood via historical and sociological inquiry; and the level of meaning construction, which connects the personal and the social through the elaboration of symbolic systems and ritual analysis. This level is the locus for anthropological analysis. This approach is illustrated by chapters on the construction of the self, the evolution of cognitive anthropology, the anthropology of emotion and the anthropology of marginalization and charisma, as well as case studies of love and culture, and of American identity. The use of multidisciplinary approaches applied to case studies was followed again in Culture and Authenticity (2007), where the contemporary quest for “the really real” was explored in the realms of art, cuisine, dance, adventure, nationalism, ethnicity, and other collective and personal arenas.

Meanwhile, the writings derived from the Swati fieldwork moved in a number of different directions, some of them captured in essays collected in Frontier Perspectives (1996). One project compared the political implications of kinship structures in the Middle East and Central Asia. Another focus was on the various strategies utilized in reconciling ideologies of egalitarianism with the realities of authority. Research on this contradiction led to consideration of the historical permutations of structural and ideological tensions endemic to other purportedly egalitarian societies in the Middle East (a theme extensively developed in The Islamic Middle East [2002]) and to comparative research on egalitarianism and the validation of command in the United States (Is America Breaking Apart? [1999]). Extending this line of thought, another book (The Struggle for the World [2010]) compared modern utopian “aurora movements” ranging from the leftist Zapatistas and rightist supporters of Le Pen to New Age ravers and Slow Food activists. Despite their vast differences, all of these seek new, purified identities and have a polarized vision of the universe. Old contrasts between left and right are blurred and even erased in this shared quest.

In sum, Lindholm's research, though often built upon exotic or extreme material, always aims to bring anthropological insight into the existential dilemmas of modern life, where “all that is solid melts into air."

== Selected publications ==
=== Books ===
- 1982 Generosity and Jealousy: The Swat Pukhtun of Northern Pakistan. New York: Columbia University Press
- 1990 Charisma. Oxford: Basil Blackwell.
- 1996 Frontier Perspectives: Essays in Comparative Anthropology. Karachi: Oxford University Press.
- 1999 Is America Breaking Apart? (With John A. Hall). Princeton: Princeton University Press
- 2002 The Islamic Middle East: Tradition and Change. Oxford: Basil Blackwell
- 2007 Culture and Identity: The History, Theory, and Practice of Psychological Anthropology. Oxford: Oneworld Publishers.
- 2007 Culture and Authenticity. Oxford: Basil Blackwell.
- 2010: The Struggle for the World: Liberation Movements for the 21st Century (with José Pedro Zúquete). Stanford: Stanford University Press.
- 2013: The Anthropology of Religious Charisma: Ecstasies and Institutions (edited volume). New York: Palgrave-Macmillan.

=== Articles ===
- 1980 “Images of the Pathan: The Usefulness of Colonial Ethnography.” European Journal of Sociology 21: 350–61.
- 1981 “The Structure of Violence Among the Swat Pukhtun.” Ethnology 20: 147–56.
- 1981 “Leatherworkers and Love Potions.” American Ethnologist 8: 512–25. Comparative Studies in Society and History 28: 334–55.
- 1986 “Kinship Structure and Political Authority: The Middle East and Central Asia.” Comparative Studies in Society and History 28: 334–55.
- 1988 “Lovers and Leaders: A Comparison of Social and Psychological Models of Romance and Charisma.” Social Science Information 27: 3-45.
- 1988 “The Social Structure of Emotional Constraint.” Ethos 16: 227–46.
- 1992 "Quandaries of Command in Egalitarian Societies: Examples from Swat and Morocco.” In: Comparing Muslim Societies. Ed. J. Cole. Ann Arbor: University of Michigan Press.
- 1992 “Charisma, Crowd Psychology and Altered States of Consciousness.” Culture, Medicine and Psychiatry 16: 287–310.
- 1995 “Love as an Experience of Transcendence.” In: Romantic Passion: A Universal Experience? Ed. W. Jankowiak. New York: Columbia University Press.
- 1995 “The New Middle Eastern Ethnography.” Journal of the Royal Anthropological Institute 1: 805–20.
- 1997 “Logical and Moral Problems of Postmodernism.” Journal of the Royal Anthropological Institute 3: 745–60.
- 1997 “Does the Sociocentric Self Exist? Reflections on Markus and Kitayama’s ‘Culture and the Self.’” Journal of Anthropological Research 53: 405-22.
- 1999 “Justice and Tyranny: Law and the State in the Middle East.” Journal of the Royal Asiatic Society Third Series, 9: 375-88.
- 2001 “Kissing Cousins: The Anthropology of Islam.” In: Interpreting Islam. Ed. H. Donnan. London: Sage.
- 2002 “Authenticity, Anthropology and the Sacred.” Anthropological Quarterly 75: 331–38.
- 2003 “Culture, Charisma and Consciousness: the Case of the Rajneeshee.” Ethos 30: 1–19.
- 2005 “An Anthropology of Emotion.” In A Companion to Psychological Anthropology: Modernity and Psychocultural Change. Eds. C. Casey and R. Edgerton. Oxford. Basil Blackwell.
- 2008: “The Culture of Envy.” In Envy: Theory and Research. Ed. Richard H. Smith. Oxford: Oxford University Press.
- 2012: “Charisma and Community in Islam: Two Routes to Jihad.” Religion and Society: Advances in Research 3: 177–84.
- 2013: “The Rise of Expressive Authenticity.” Anthropology Quarterly 86 (2): 361–396.
- 2013: “Swat in Retrospect: Continuities, Transformations and Possibilities.” In Beyond Swat: History, Society, and Economy along the Afghanistan-Pakistan Border. Eds. Magnus Marsden & Benjamin Hopkins. London: Hurst.
- 2016: "Generous Envy." Digital Development Debates, issue #17, March 2016.
