= Fanny Churberg =

Finnish landscape painter

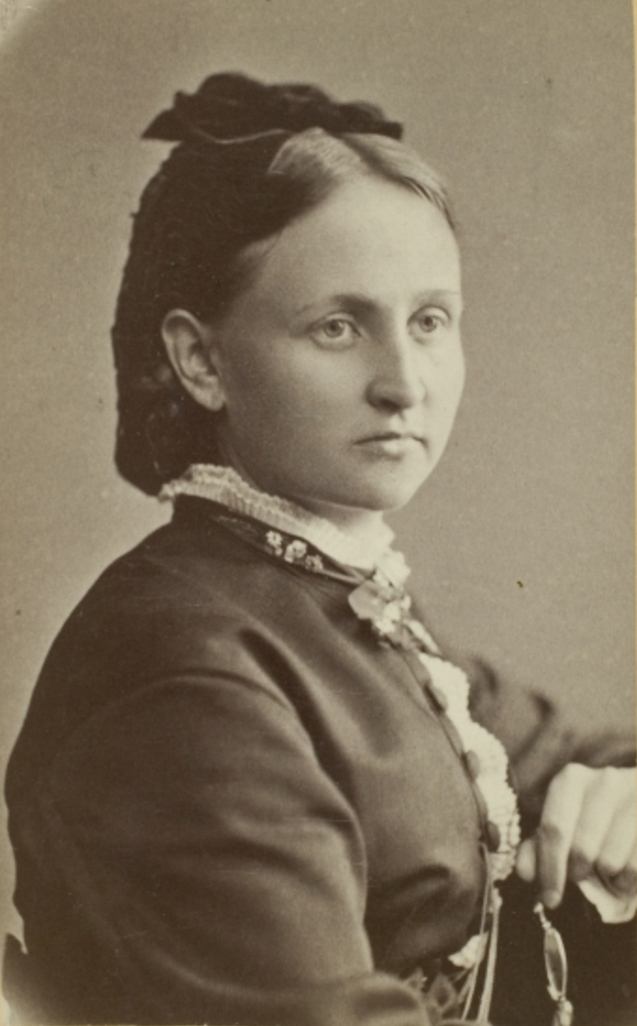
- Born: 12 December 1845; Vaasa, Finland
- Died: 10 May 1892 (aged 46); Helsinki, Finland
- Known for: Painting
- Movement: Düsseldorf school of painting

Fanny Churberg (12 December 1845 – 10 May 1892) was a Finnish landscape painter.

== Biography ==
Churberg was born on 12 December 1845, in Vaasa. Her father, Matias Churberg, was a doctor from a family of farmers and her mother Maria was the daughter of the vicar in Liperi parish, Nils Johan Perander. Fanny was the third of seven children. Four of her siblings died when they were young and so Fanny grew up with her two older brothers Torsten and Waldemar Churberg. Fanny was proud of her Ostrobothnian family and heritage and was planning along with her brothers on changing the surname to Kuurila according to the family's old estate. They never got around to it though.

When Fanny was twelve her mother died and she had to take on large parts of the responsibility of being the matron of the house. Later on she got sent to a girls' school in Porvoo, but she returned to Vaasa when she was 17–18 years old. When she was 20 her father died. Fanny cared for him day and night during the last months of his life. After her father's death she and her brothers moved to Helsinki, where they lived with their aunt.

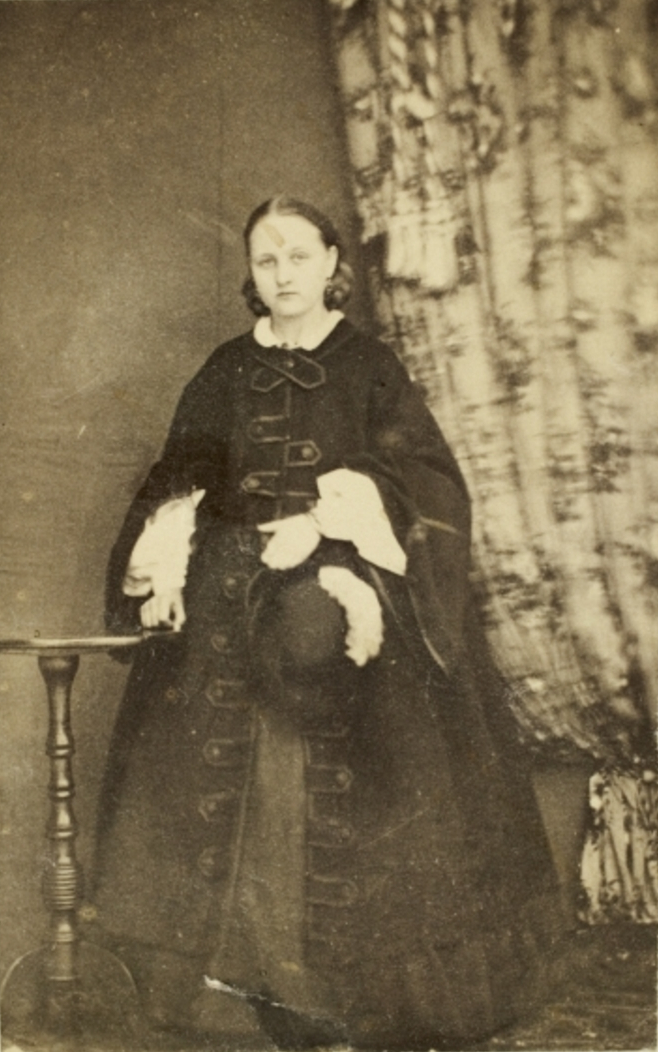
Young Churberg in the early 1860s

She started her artistic training in Helsinki in 1865 with private lessons from Alexandra Frosterus-Såltin, Emma Gyldén and Berndt Lindholm. Her studies continued in Düsseldorf, Germany, but she always returned to Finland to paint during the summer. She was also one of the first Finnish painters to study in Paris, France. Although Churberg remained to a large extent within the conventions of the Düsseldorf school of painting, she openly expressed her enthusiasm for the countryside and its dramatic situations, relying above all on colour and a fast brush technique to do so. The charged quality of her work differed sharply from that of her contemporaries, as did her subjects, for example the tense atmosphere before a thunderstorm in the open country or the deep, swampy heart of the forest. Churberg founded the Friends of Finnish Handicrafts in 1879. She urged Finnish women to join the Friends' effort to revive textile practice in Finland.

Fanny Churberg's career ended suddenly in 1880. Her health was weaker and she took care of her brother Torsten who was suffering from tuberculosis. Torsten's death in 1882 made her quite lonely and her will to live lessened as did her energy. The other brother Waldemar, to whom she used to be very close, had married in 1877. The reason for ending her career might also have been the harsh criticism she had met before, but she never withdrew completely from the art circles. She did not however paint anymore after 1880, not even for her own amusement, but during her career she had still managed to produce over 300 paintings.

Churberg died on 10 May 1892, in Helsinki.

== Legacy ==
Churberg was included in the 2018 exhibit Women in Paris 1850-1900. In 2024, she was also included in the exhibition Against All Odds at the National Gallery of Denmark.

== Works ==
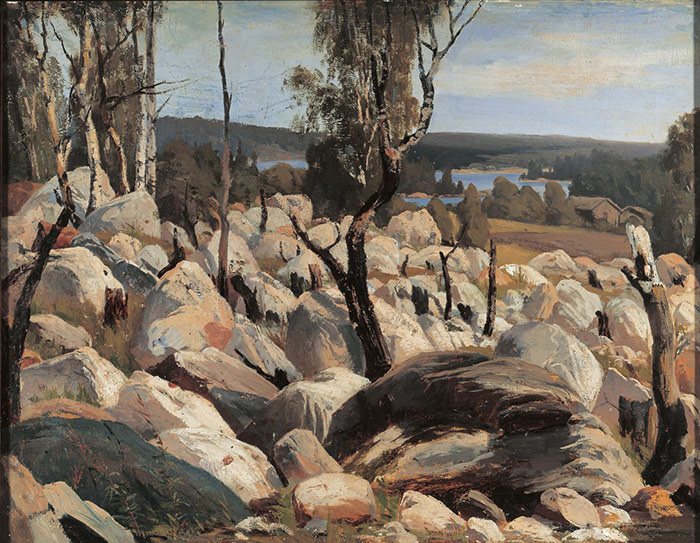
Fire-Fallow Landscape from Uusimaa, c. 1872

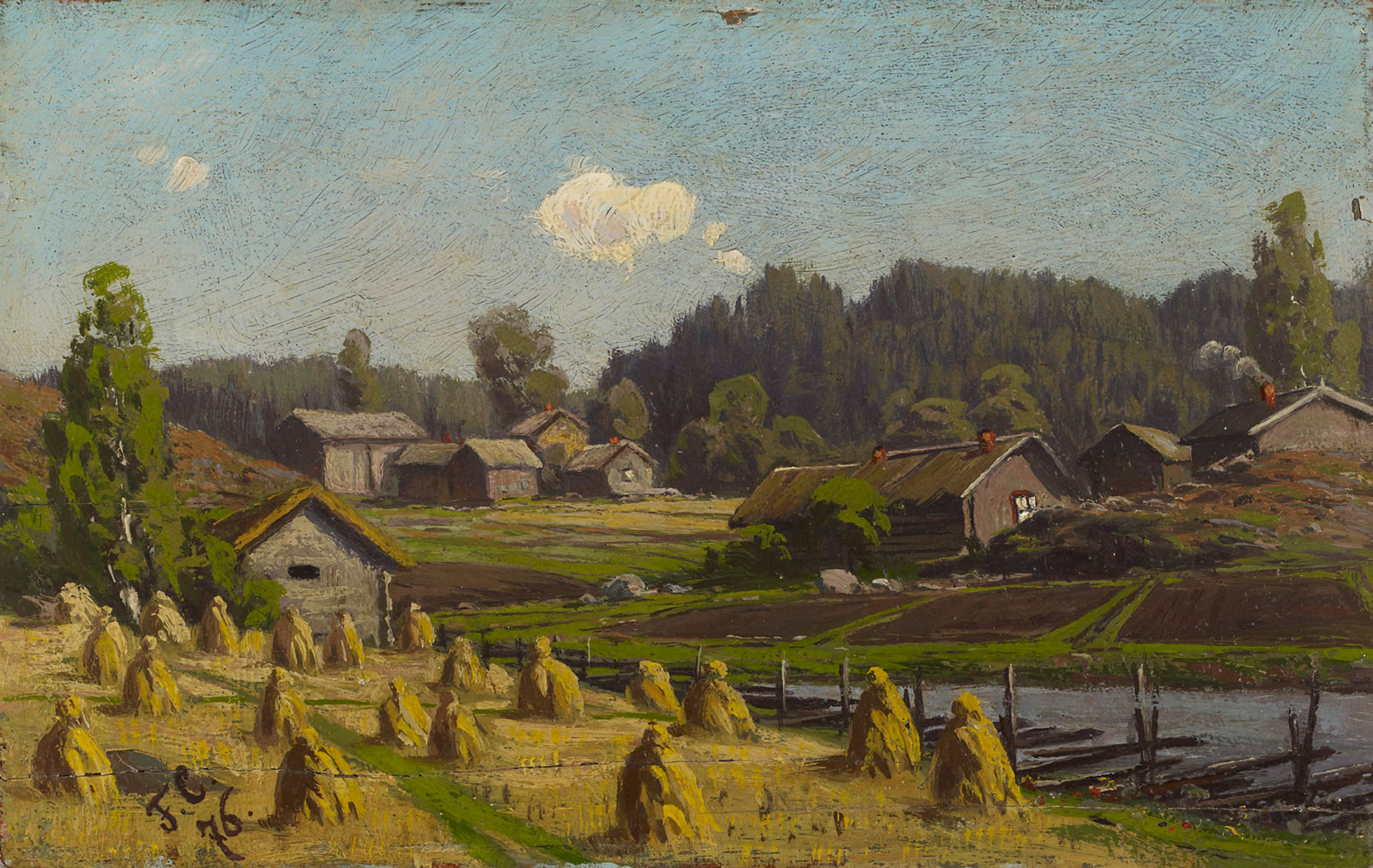
Shocks of Rye, 1876

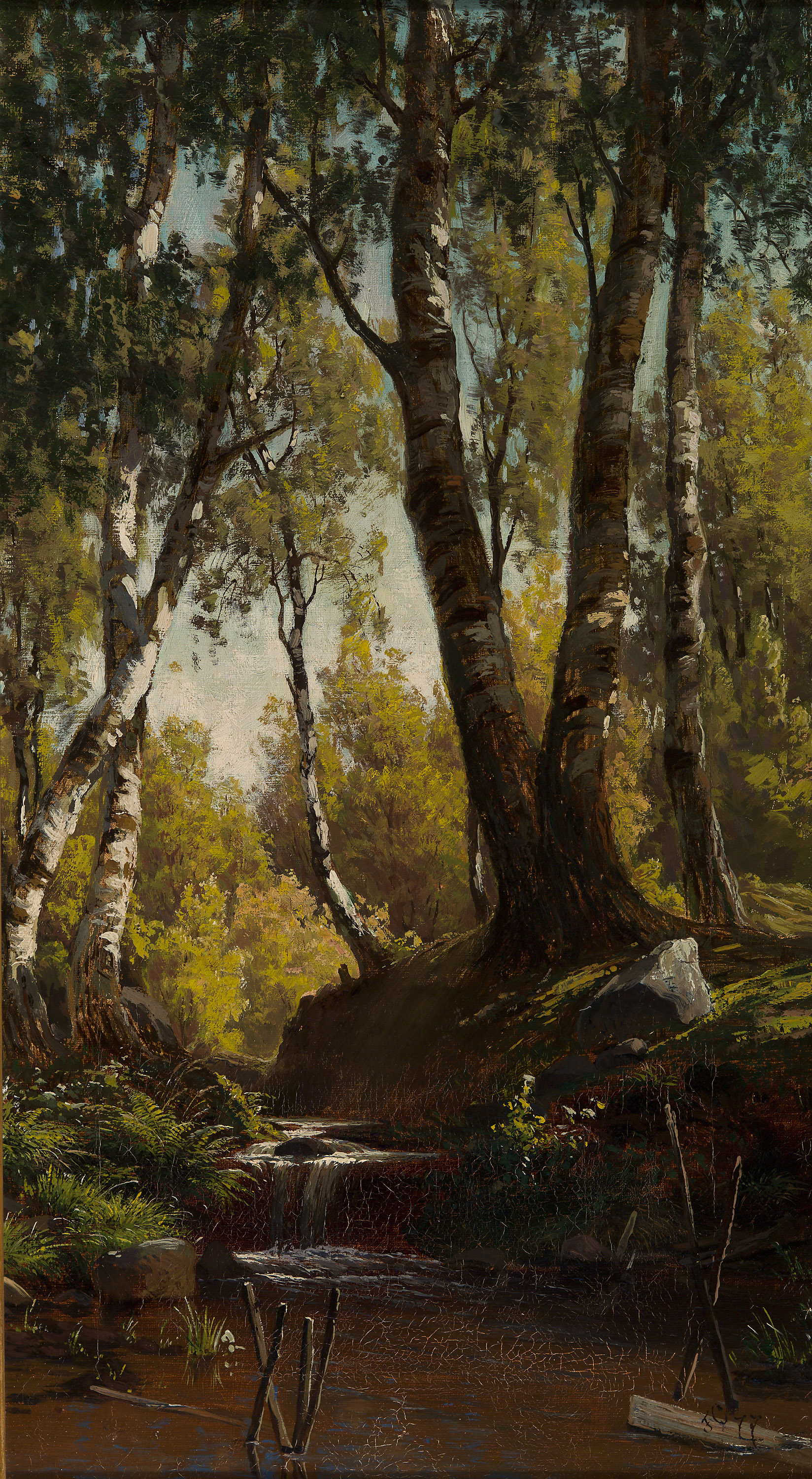
Forest Creek, 1877

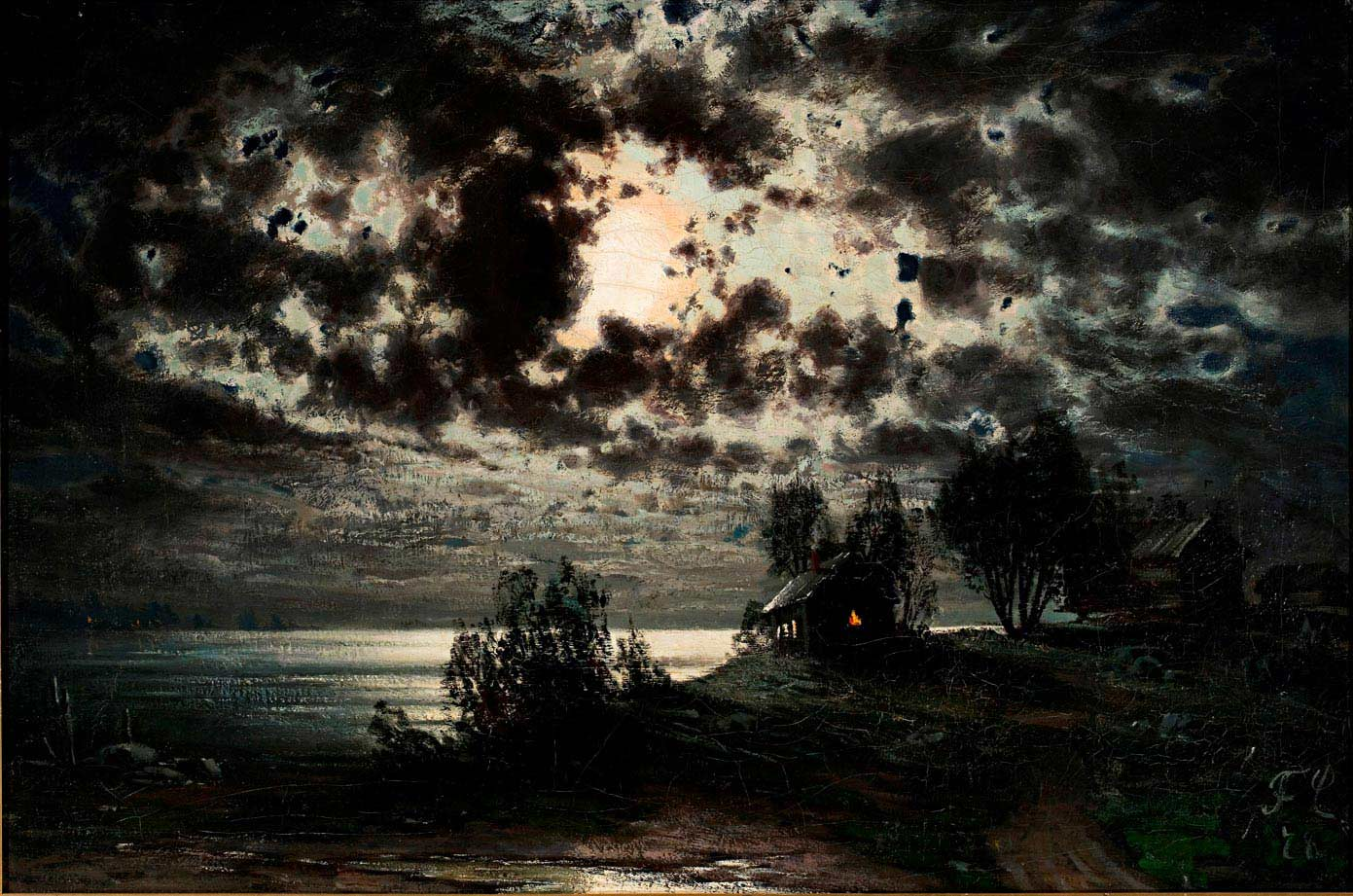
Landscape in Moonlight, 1878

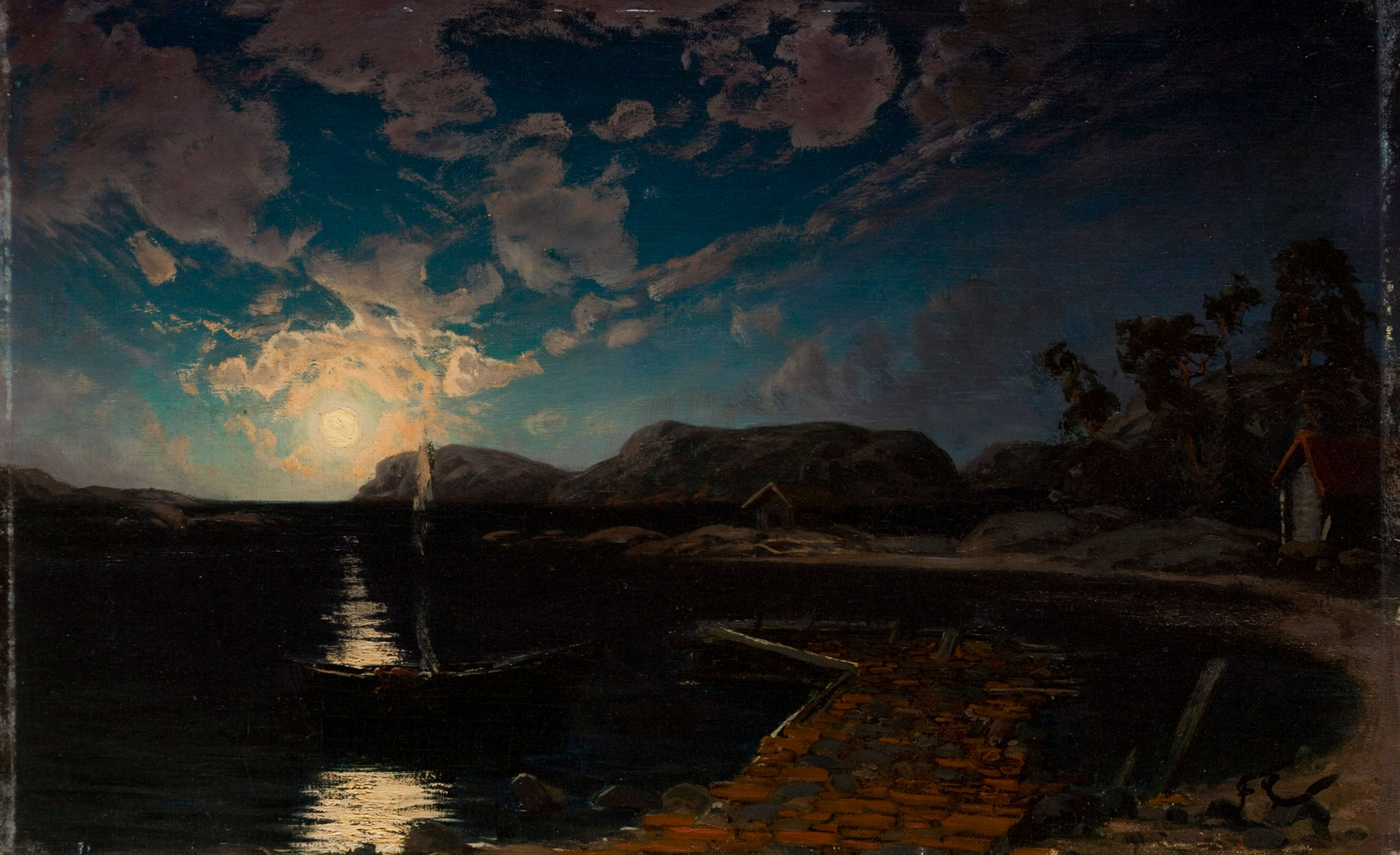
Landscape in Moonlight, 1878

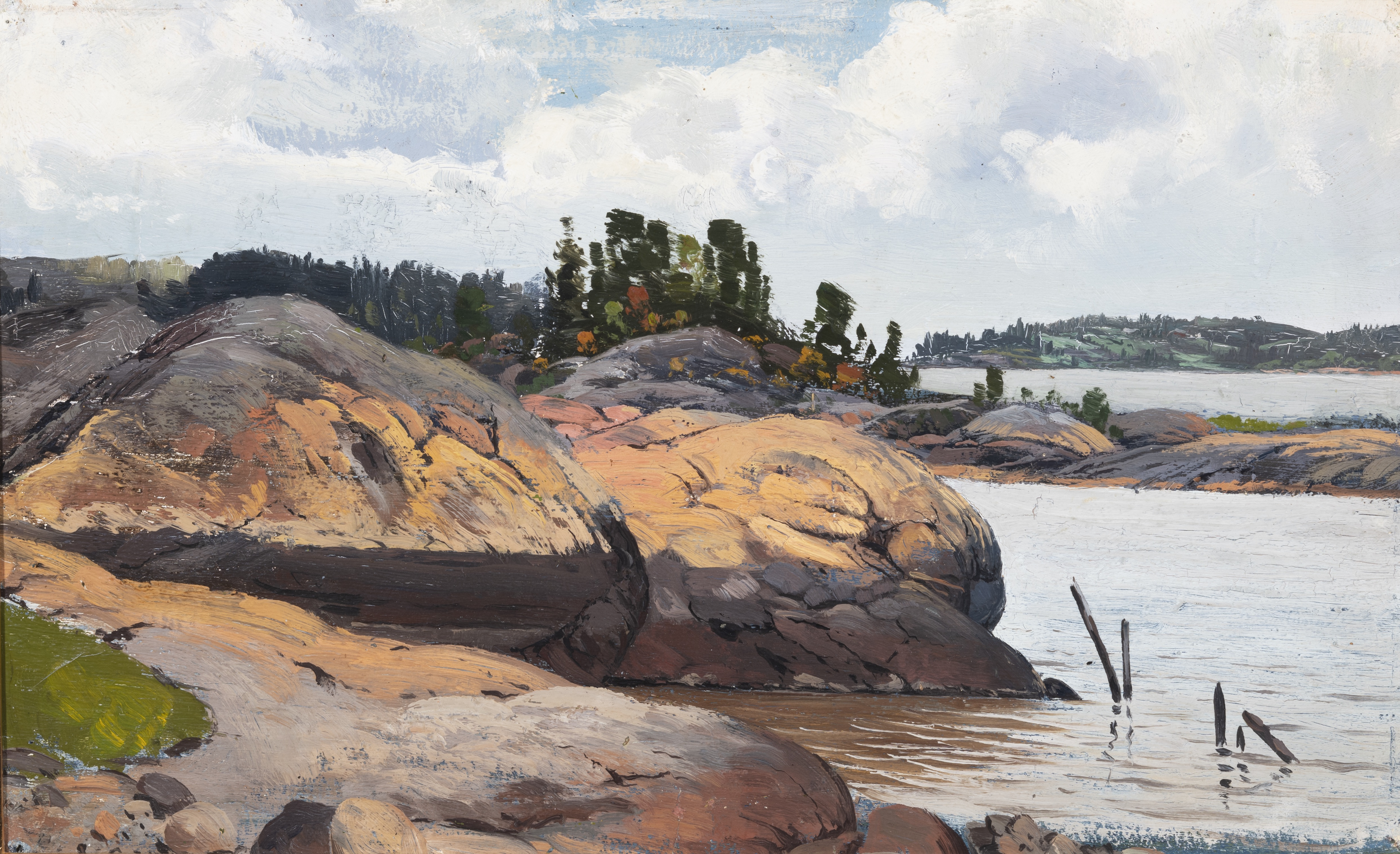
A Rocky Shore in the Archipelago, 1878

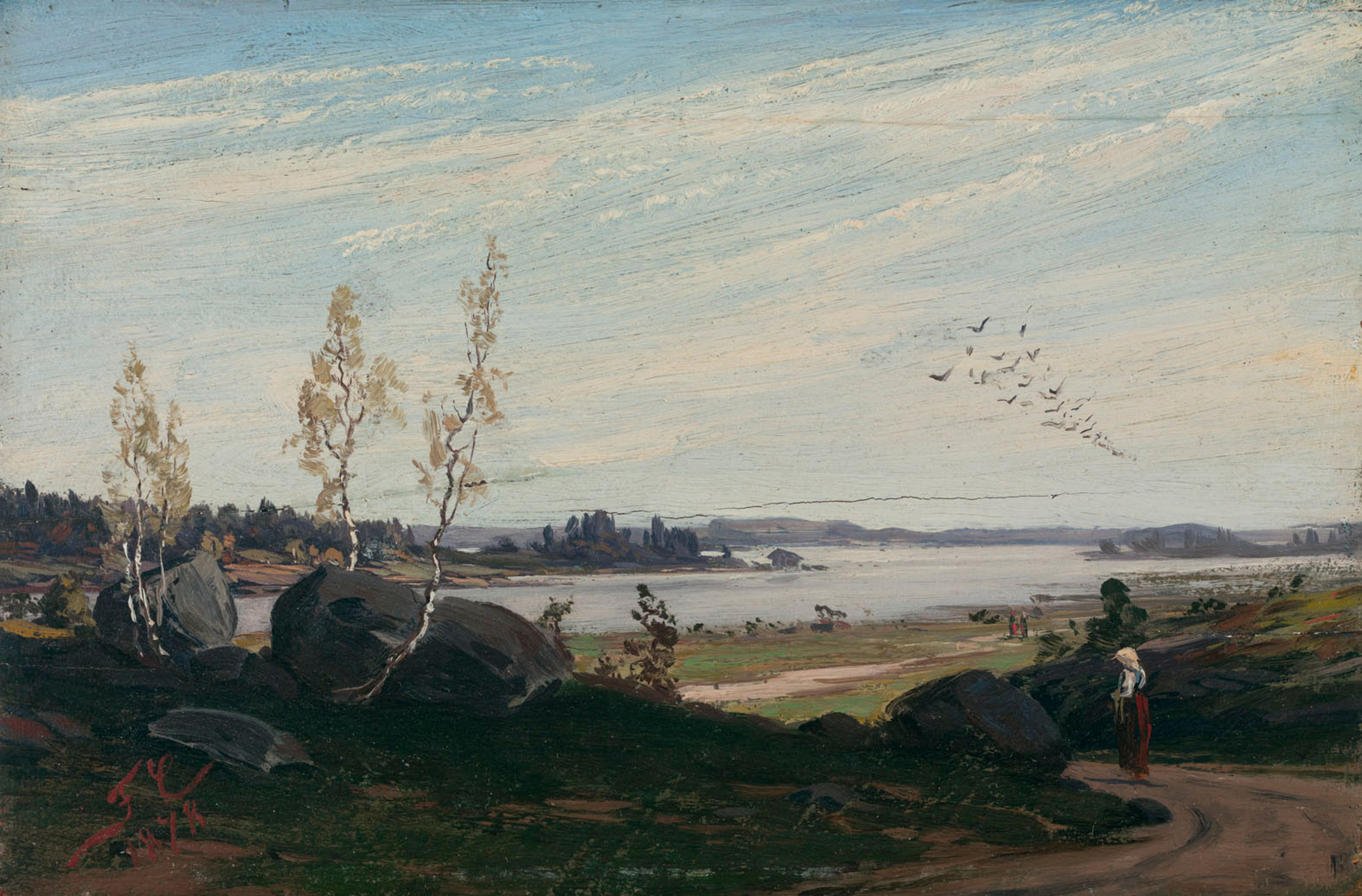
Migratory Birds, 1878

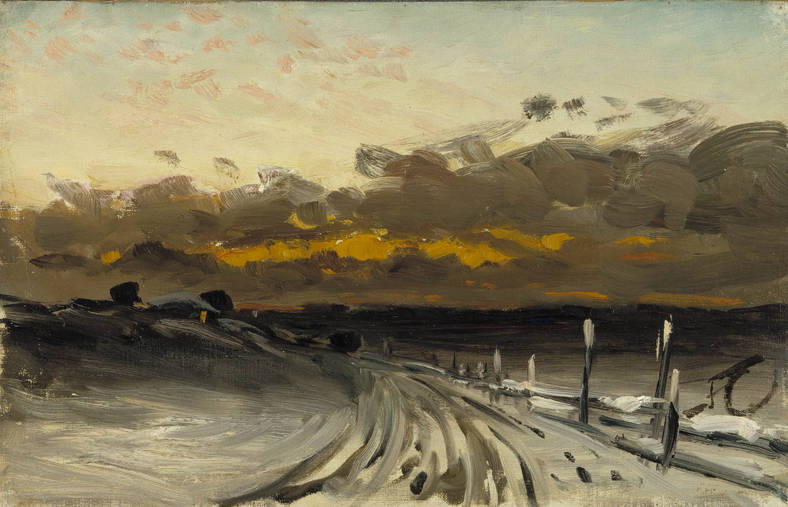
Winter Landscape, Sunset, 1878

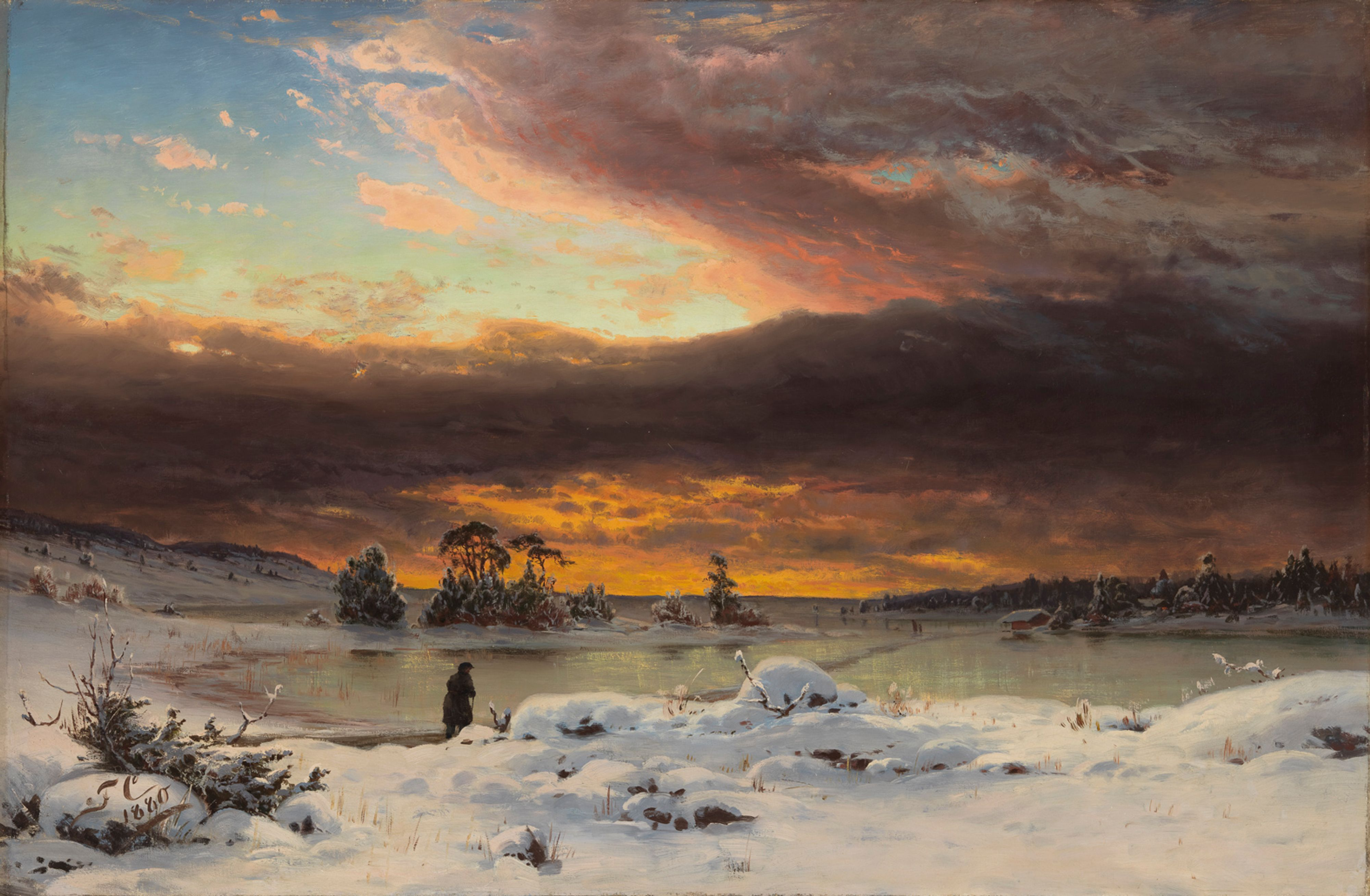
Winter Landscape, Evening Atmosphere, 1880

== See also ==
- Finnish art
