= José Pedro Zúquete =

Portuguese historian and political sociologist (1976-)

José Pedro Zúquete (born 27 May 1976) is a Portuguese political scientist. Born in Leiria, Portugal, he holds a licentiate in history and a doctorate in political science. He has studied and worked at the University of Coimbra, the Sapienza University of Rome, the University of Bath, the Sorbonne Nouvelle University and the University of Washington. Among his works are the books The Struggle for the World: Liberation Movements for the 21st Century (2010), The Identitarians: The Movement against Globalism and Islam in Europe (2019) and Populismo: Lá fora e cá dentro (2022).
