= Berndt Lindholm =

Finnish painter (1841–1914)

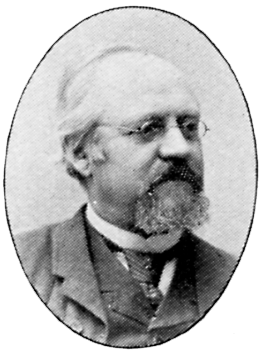
- Berndt Lindholm. From the Swedish Portrait Gallery XX (1901)
- Born: 20 August 1841; Loviisa
- Died: 15 May 1914 (aged 72); Gothenburg
- Education: Member Academy of Arts (1873)
- Alma mater: Düsseldorf School
- Known for: Painting

Berndt Adolf Lindholm (20 August 1841 – 15 May 1914) was a Finnish landscape painter ( belonging to Swedish speaking population of Finland ). He is usually associated with the Düsseldorf School, but his work also displays early Impressionist elements. He specialized in coastal scenes.

== Biography ==
He took his first drawing lessons from Johan Knutson in Porvoo. From 1856 to 1861, he attended the drawing school of the Finnish Art Society in Turku, where he studied with Robert Wilhelm Ekman. From 1863 to 1865, he attended the Kunstakademie Düsseldorf then went to the Academy of Arts in Karlsruhe for one year to continue his studies with Hans Gude. In 1867 he arrived in Paris, where he was strongly influenced by the new French painting. He was the first Finn to embrace French landscape painting and apply it to Nordic nature. Upon returning to Helsinki, he was a teacher for a short time at the Finnish Art Society's drawing school, with the young Albert Edelfelt among his students.

His first solo exhibition (Helsinki, 1870) was successful and, three years later, he was invited to become a member of the Imperial Academy of Arts.

From 1873 to 1874, he was in Paris, where his teachers included Léon Bonnat. He also came under the influence of Charles-François Daubigny and the Barbizon school. In 1876, he was awarded a medal at the Centennial Exposition in Philadelphia and received the Finnish State Prize the following year.

That same year he settled in Gothenburg and became Curator of the city art collection in 1878; a position he held until 1900. He also taught at the Valand Academy and was elected to the Royal Swedish Academy of Arts. In addition to his painting, he provided illustrations for several works by Zacharias Topelius.

His work is represented at the Nationalmuseum in Stockholm, the Turku Art Museum, Åbo Akademi University and the Gothenburg Art Museum and at museums in Norrköping and Vänersborg.

== Selected paintings ==
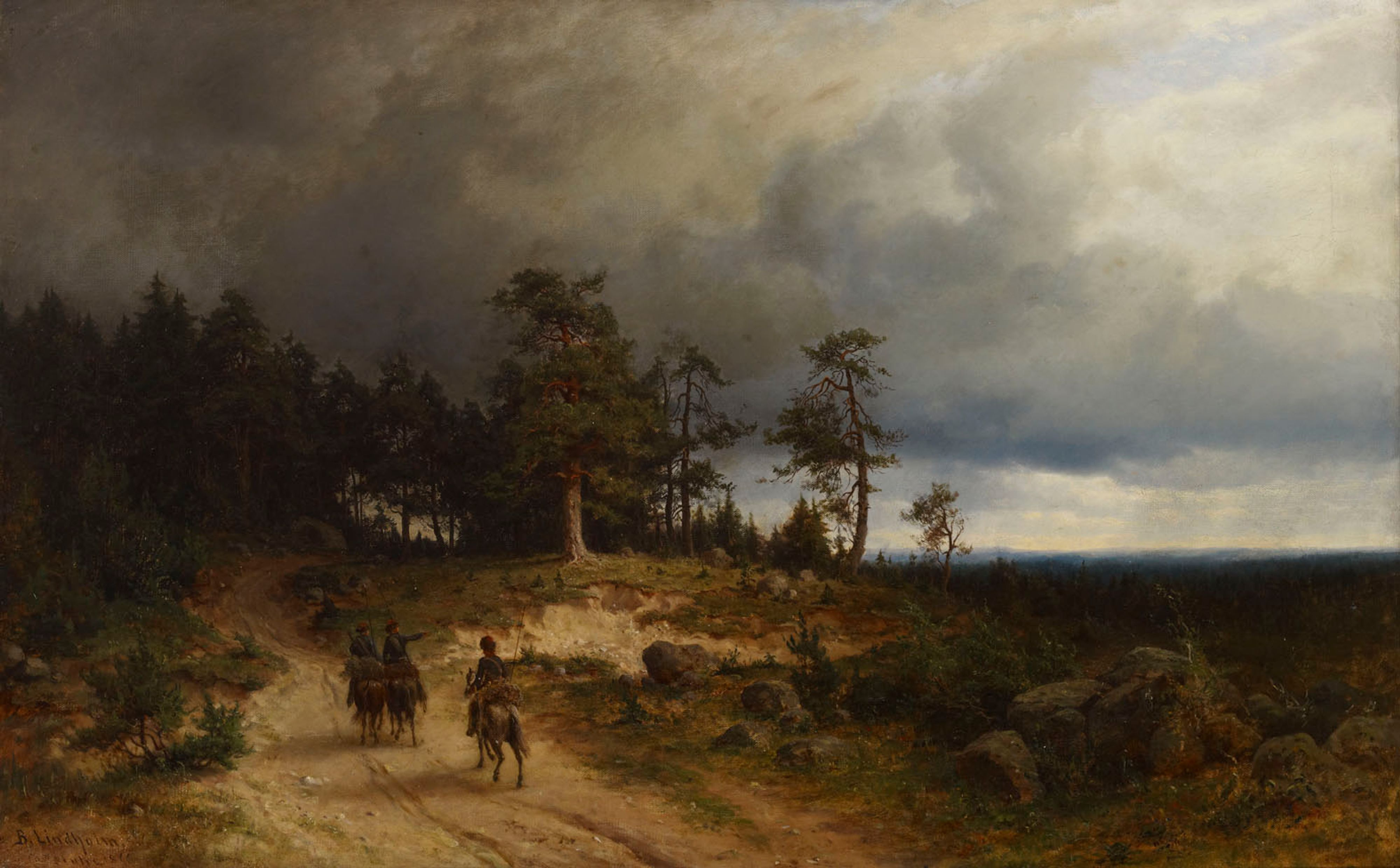
Landscape in Eastern Finland with Mounted Cossacks, 1866

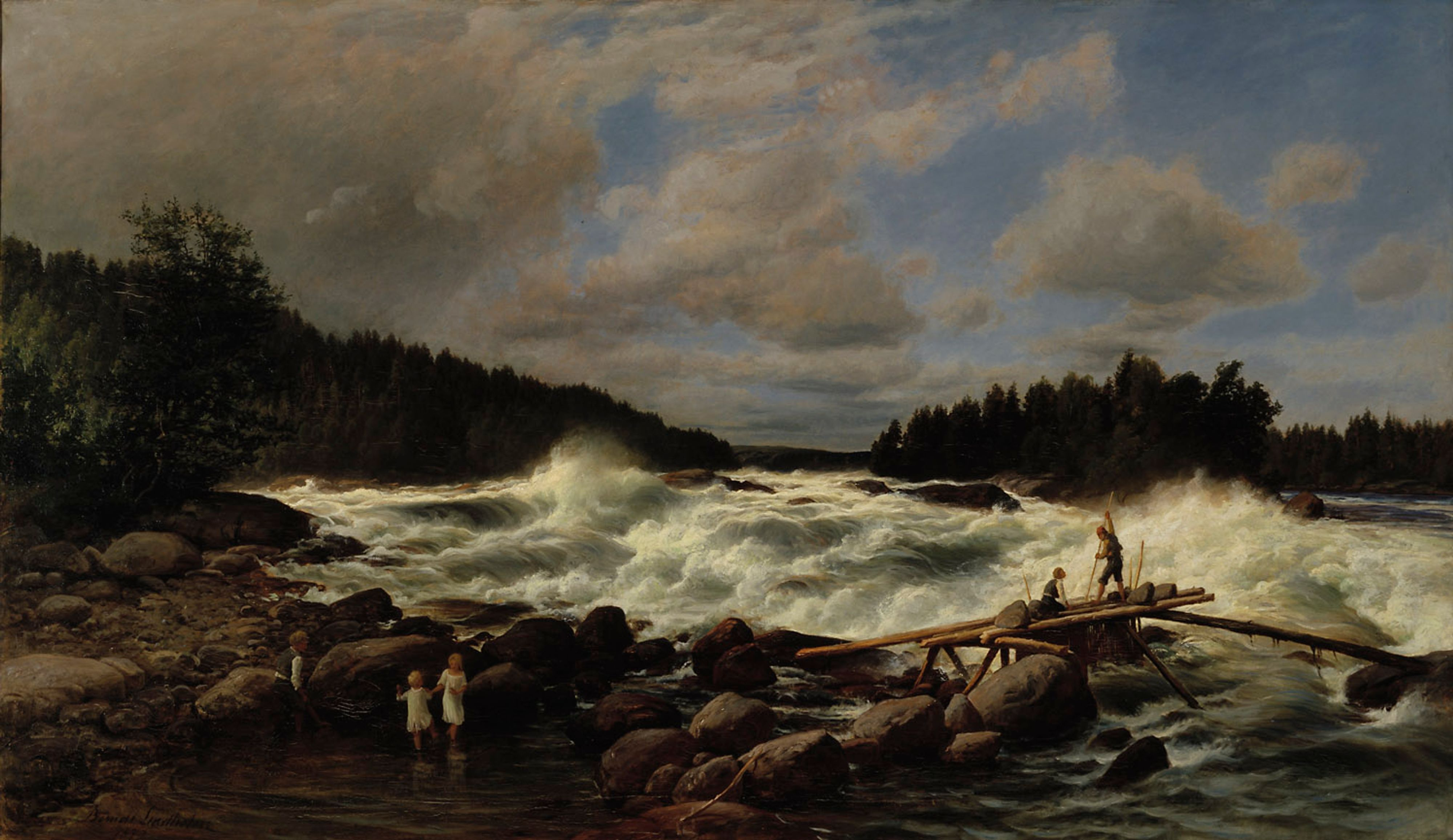
Vallinkoski Rapid, 1872

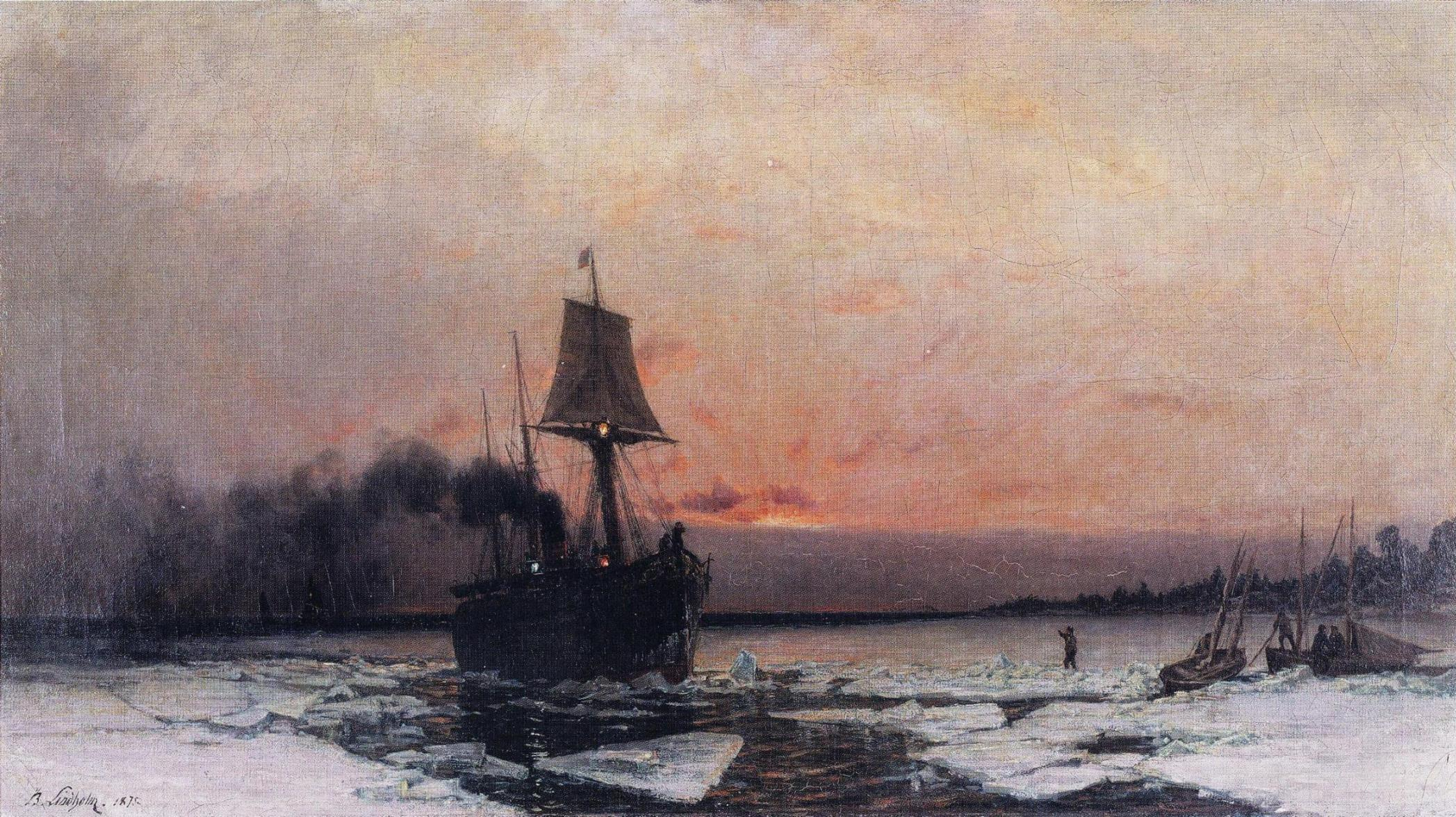
Steamboat in the Ice, 1875

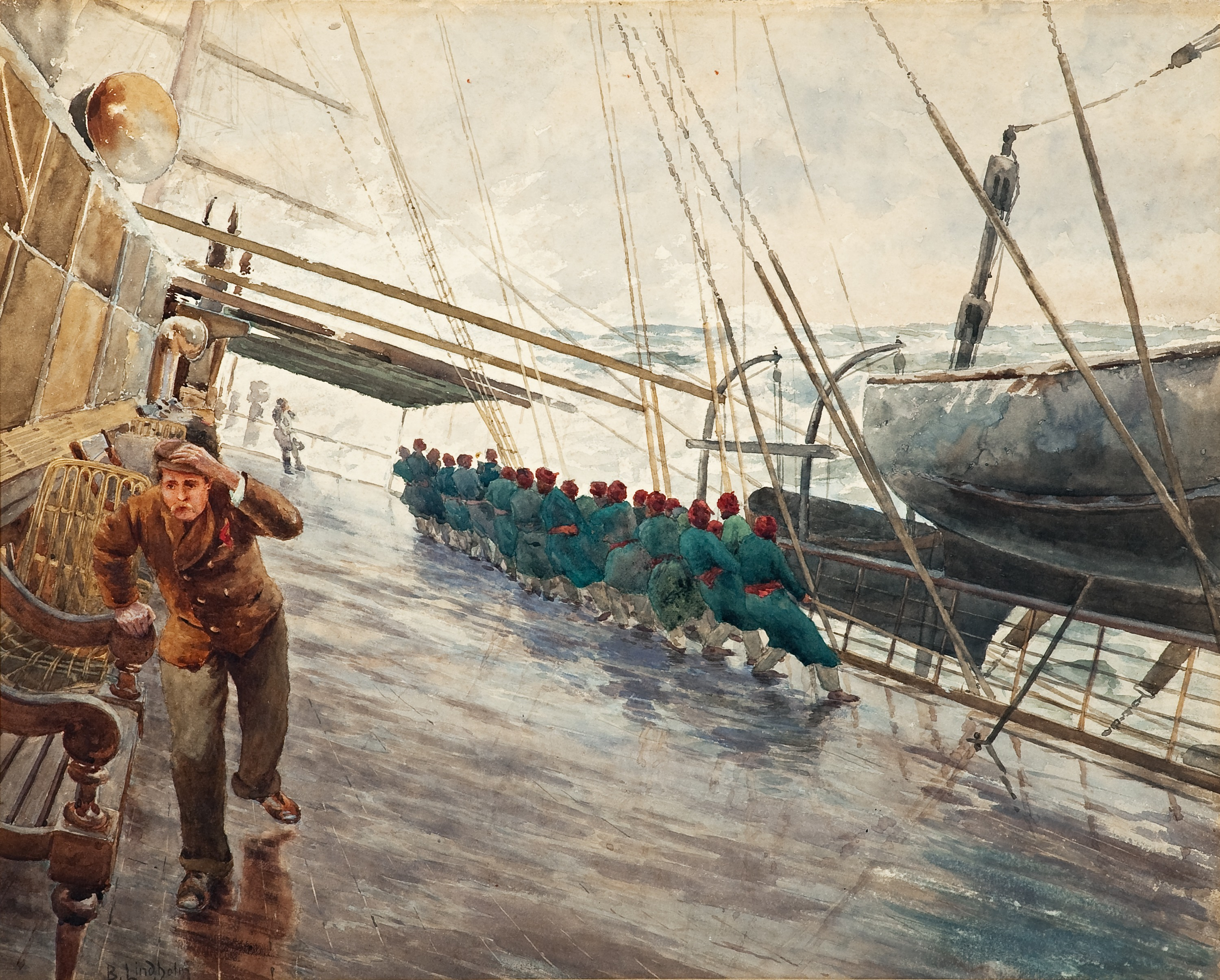
Ship on a Stormy Sea

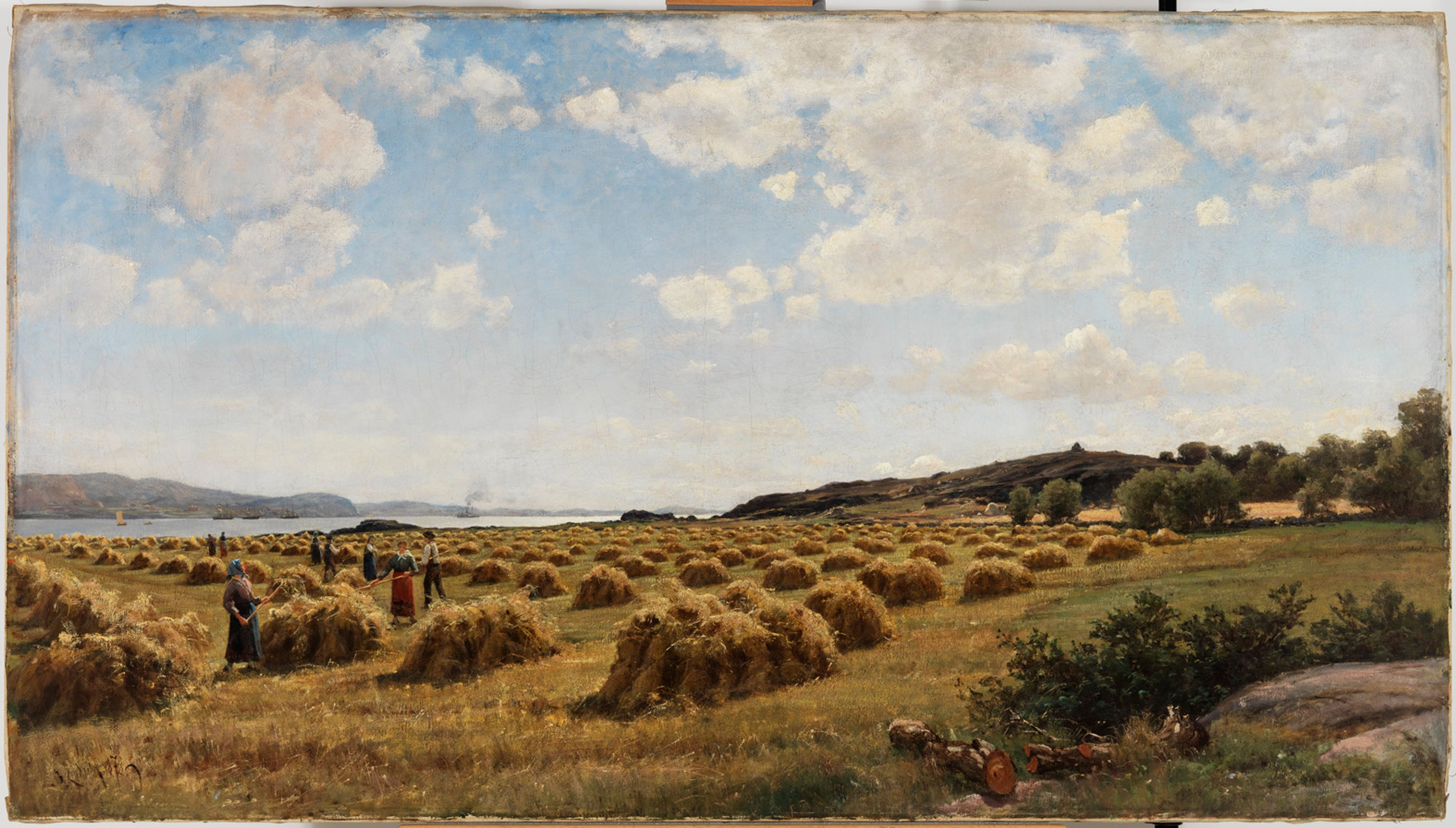
Oat Harvest on the Hisingen Island, 1878

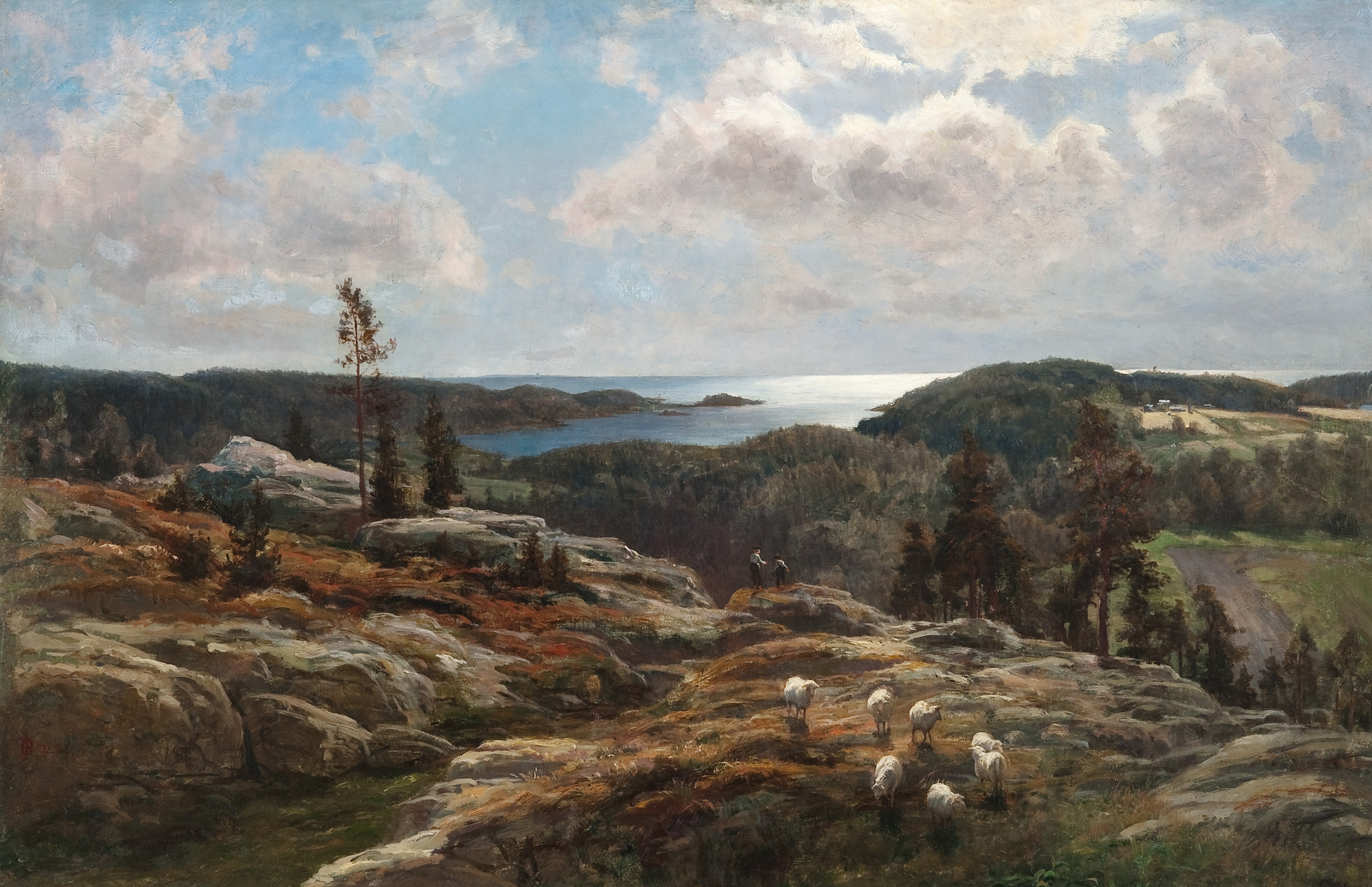
View of Ladoga, 1878

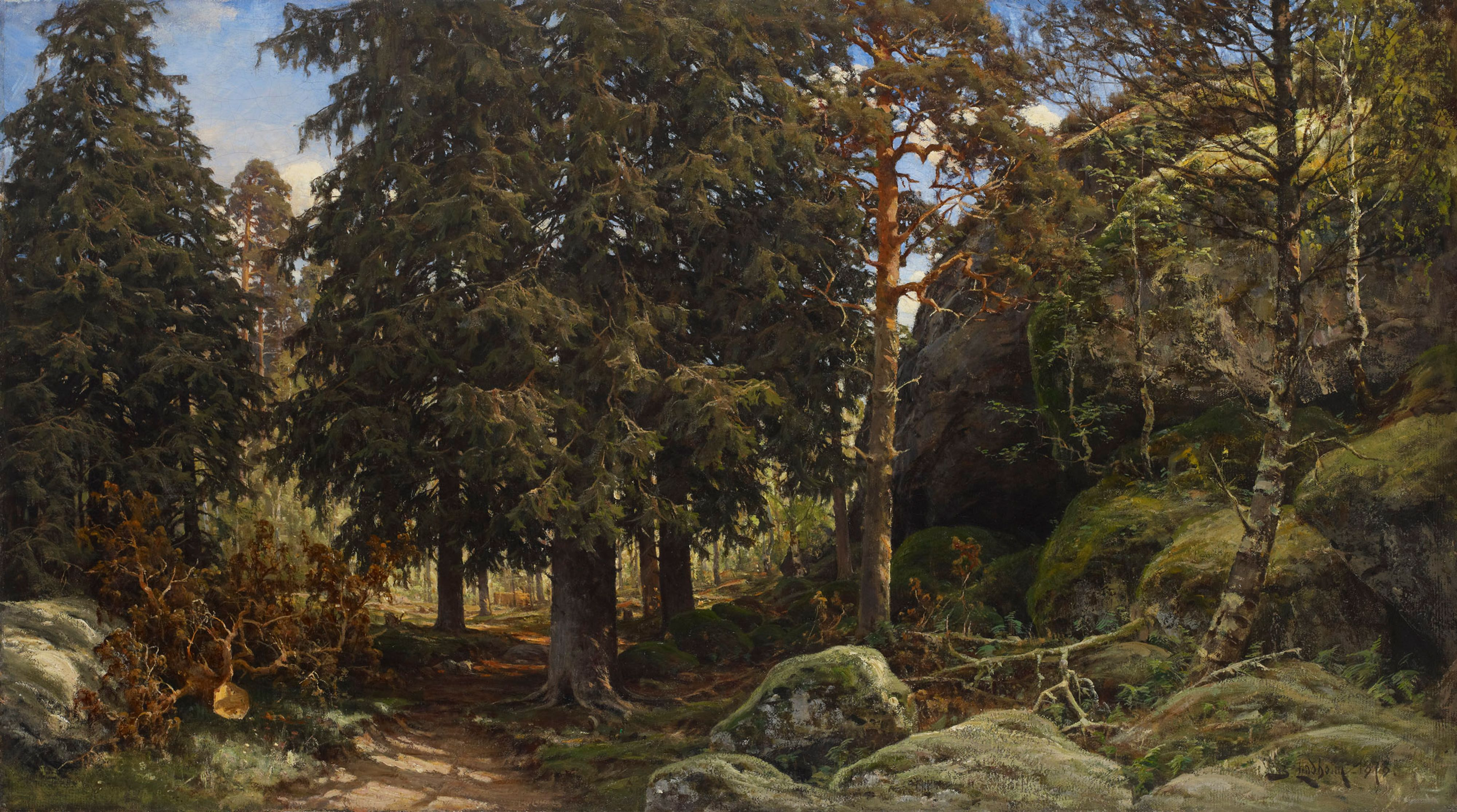
Forest Interior, 1878

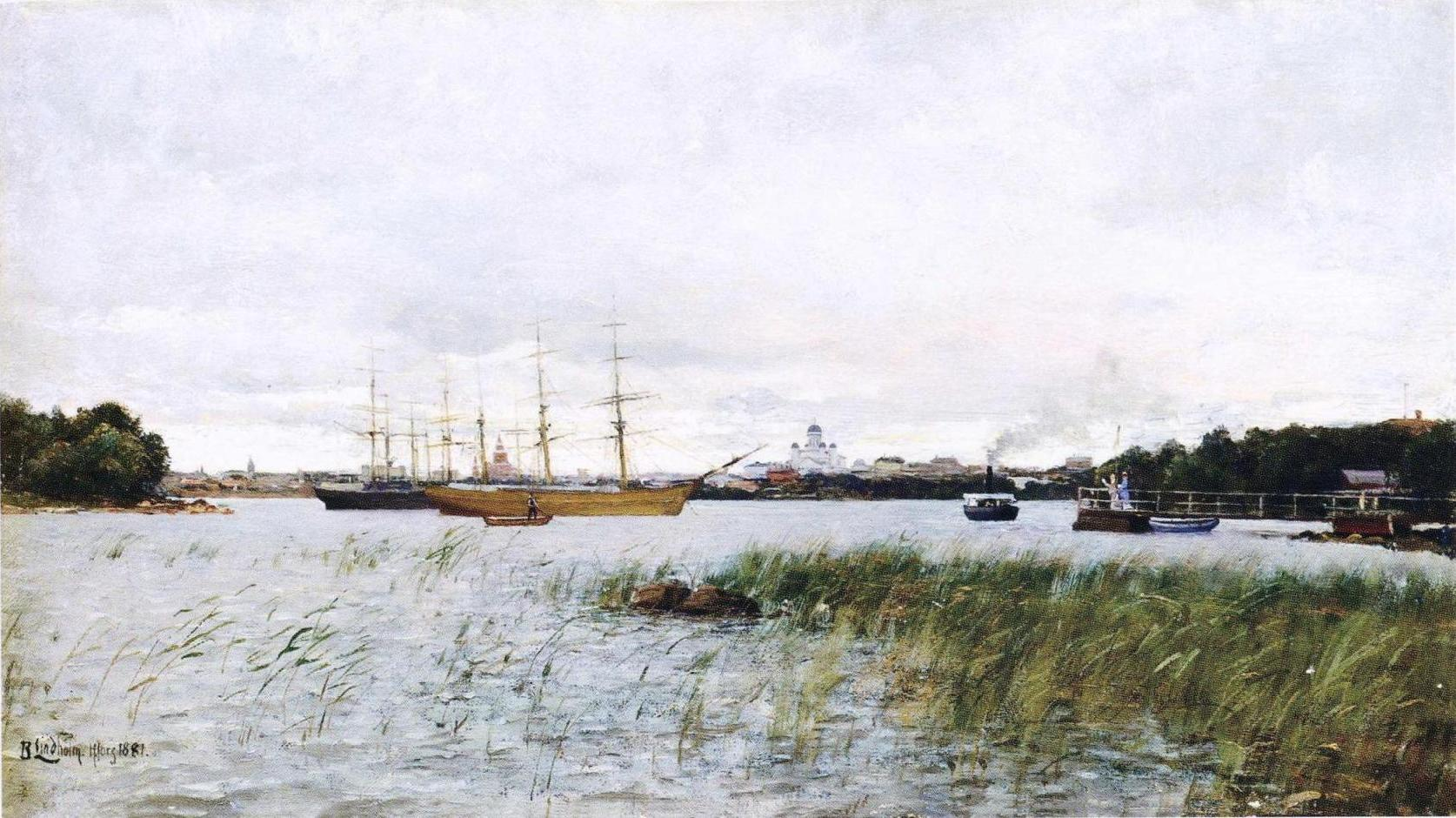
Helsinki seen from Sörnäinen, 1881

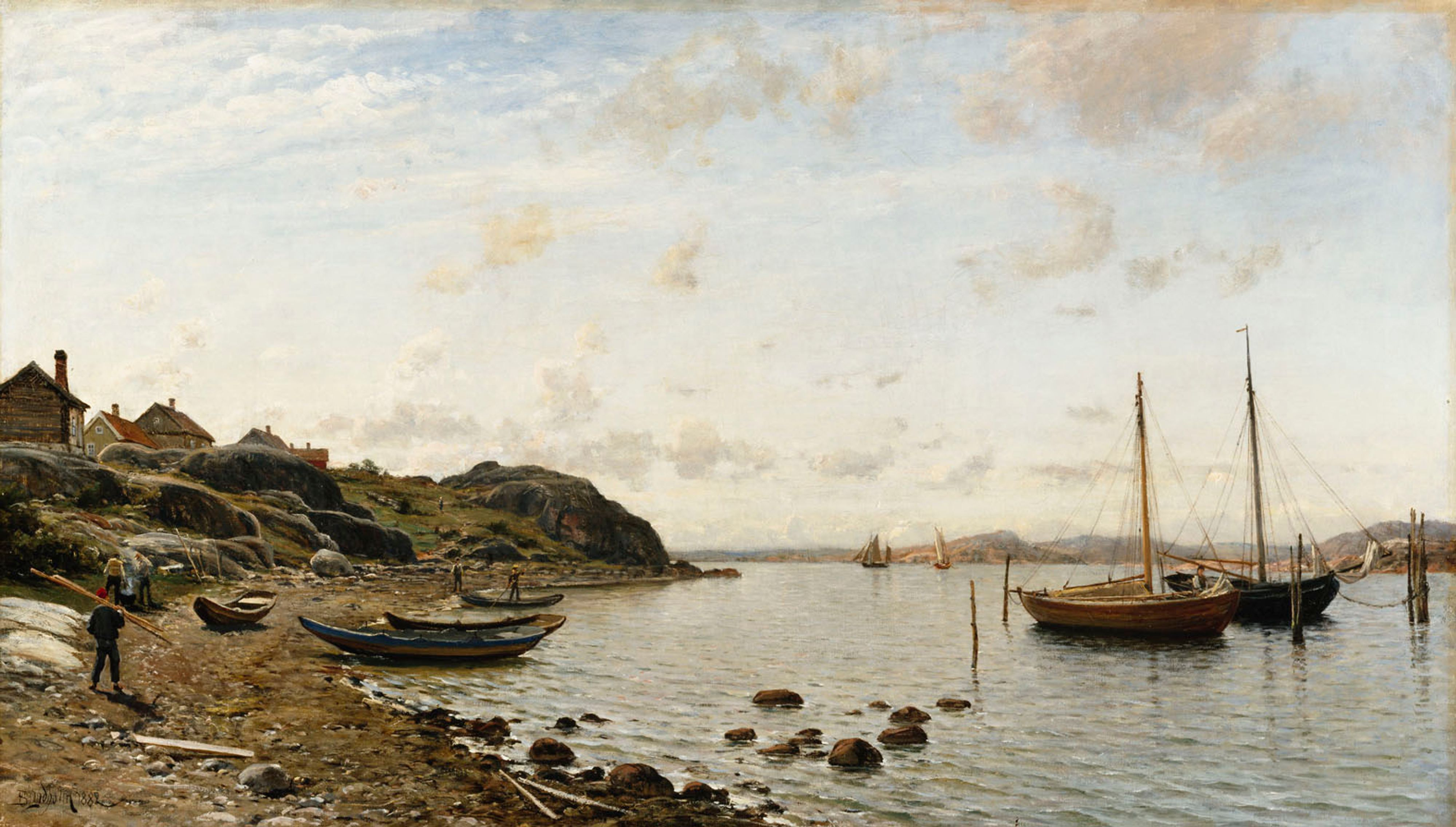
Shore Scene, 1882

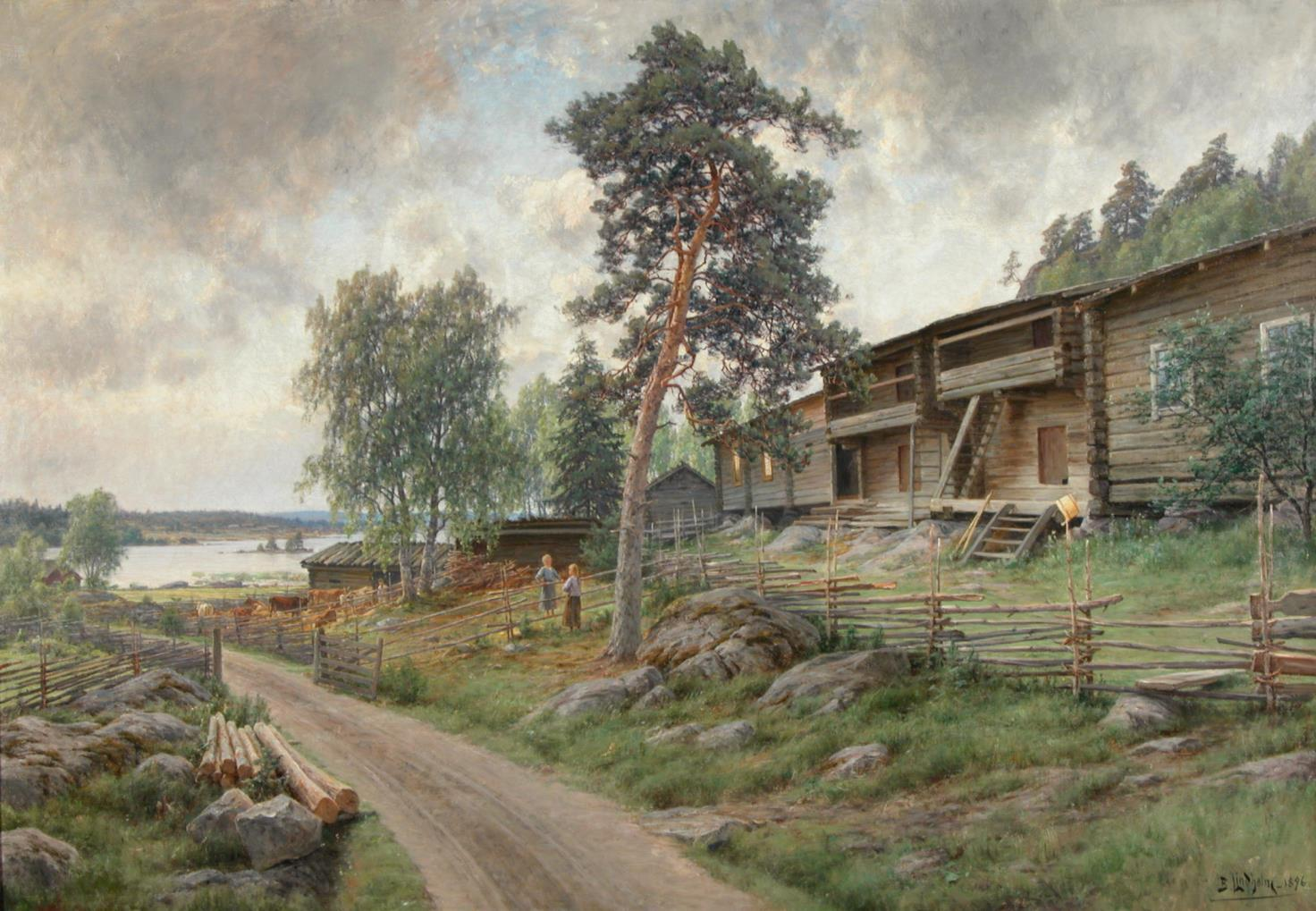
Landscape from Häme, 1896

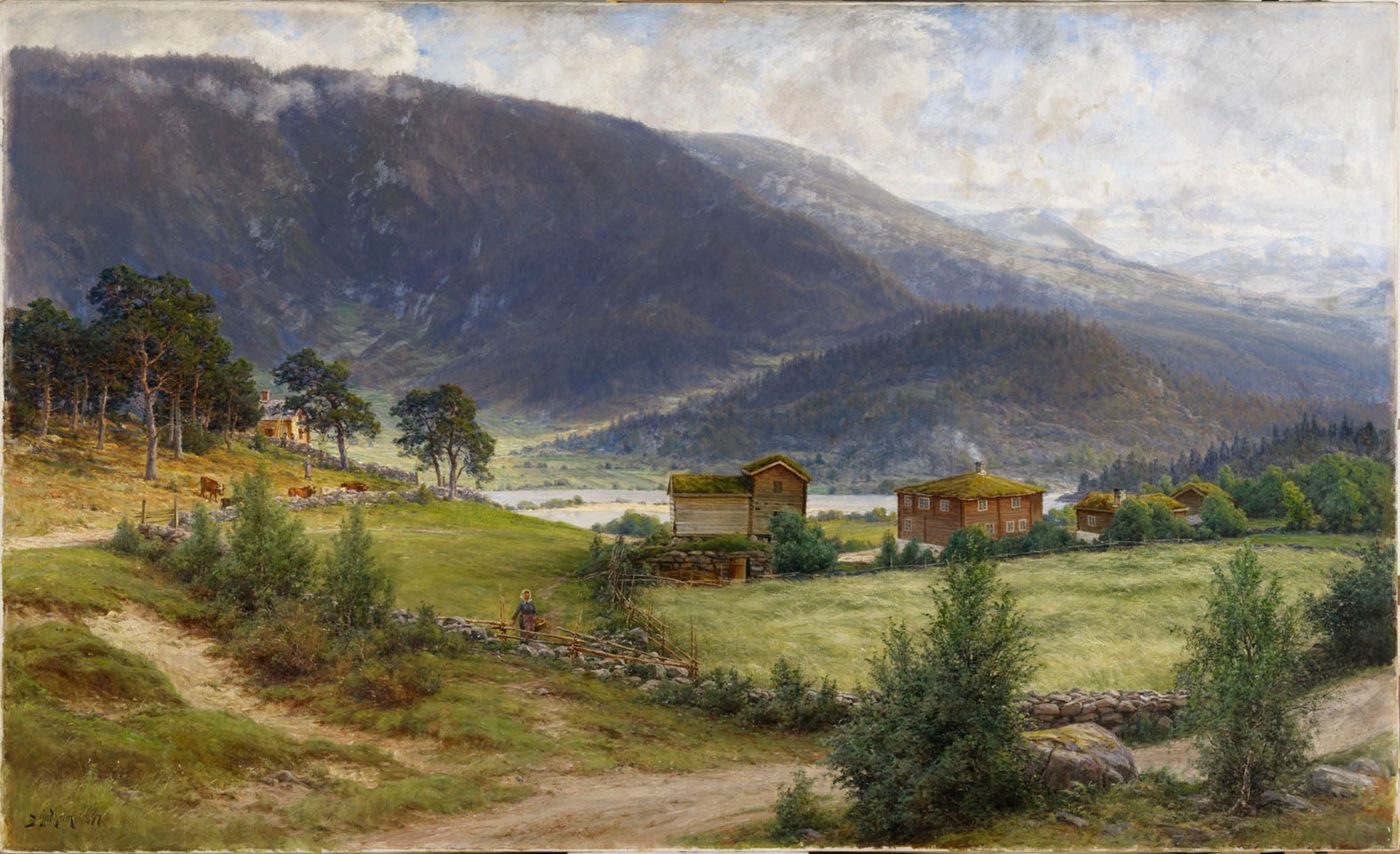
Norwegian Landscape, 1897

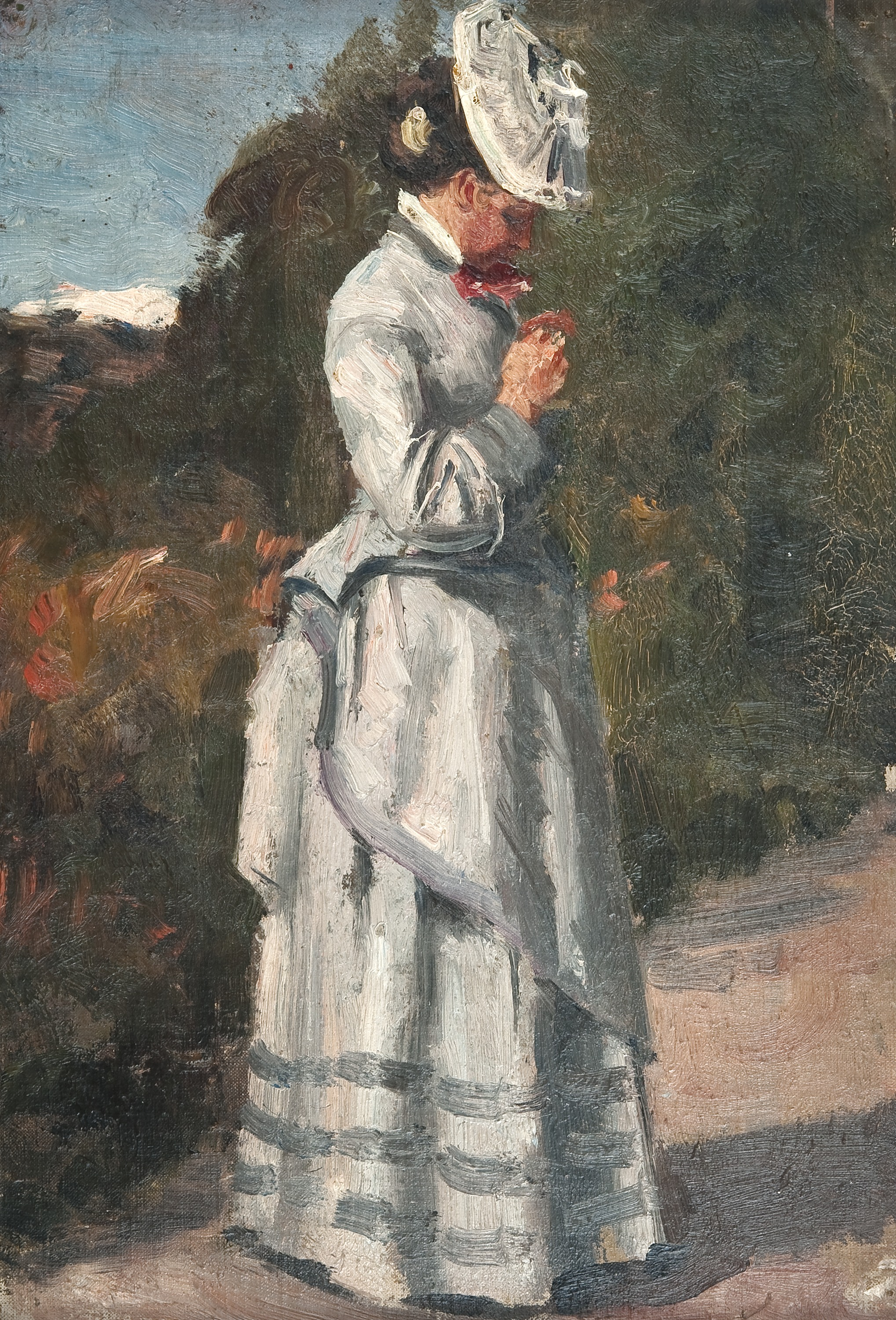
Longing

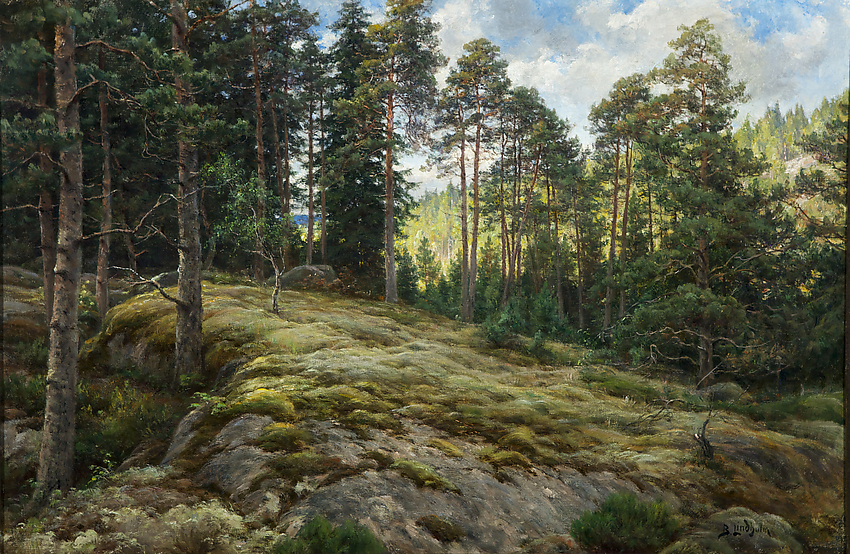
Rocky Hillside in a Pine Forest

== See also ==
- Finnish art
