= List of painters from Sweden =

This is a list of notable painters from, or associated with, Sweden.

== A ==
- Carl Gabriel Adelsköld (1830–1914)
- Ulla Adlerfelt (1736–1765)
- Sofia Adlersparre (1808–1862)
- Anna Agnér (1896–1977)
- Ivan Aguéli (1869–1917)
- Sofia Ahlbom (1823–1868)
- Lea Ahlborn (1829–1891)
- Modhir Ahmed (born 1956)
- Margareta Alströmer (1763–1816)
- Hjördis Piuva Andersson (born 1933)
- Tage Åsén (born 1943)
- Tore Asplund (1903–1977)

== B ==
- Eva Bagge (1871–1964)
- John Bauer (1882–1918)
- Richard Bergh (1858–1919)
- Alfred Bergström (1869-1930)
- Anna Billing (1849–1927)
- Torsten Billman (1909–1989)
- Hugo Birger (1854–1887)
- Oscar Björck (1860–1929)
- Eva Bonnier (1857–1909)
- Carl Oscar Borg (1879–1947)
- Carl Fredrik von Breda (1759–1818)

== C ==
- John Fabian Carlson (1875–1945)
- Otto Gustaf Carlsund (1897–1948)
- Maria Carowsky (1723–1793)
- Charlotta Cedercreutz (1736–1815)
- Siv Cedering (1939–2007)
- Christina Charlotta Cederström (1760–1832)
- Gustaf Cederström (1845–1933)
- Emma Chadwick (1855–1932)

== D ==
- Michael Dahl (1659–1743)
- Peter Dahl (1934–2019)
- Nils Dardel (1888–1943)
- Siri Derkert (1888–1973)

== E ==
- Anna Maria Ehrenstrahl (1666–1729)
- Marianne Ehrenström (1773–1867)
- Benny Ekman (born 1955)
- Marie-Louise Ekman (born 1944)
- Emma Ekwall (1838–1925)
- Knut Ekwall (1843–1912)
- Ester Ellqvist (1880–1918)
- Albert Engström (1869–1940)
- Sven Erixson (1899–1970)
- Astri Ekengren-Larsson (1898–1990)

== F ==
- Öyvind Fahlström (1928–1976)
- Gustaf Fjæstad (1868–1948)
- Victor Forssell (1846–1931)
- John Erik Franzén (1942–2022)
- David Frumerie (1641–1677)

== G ==
- Carl Johan De Geer (born 1938)
- Wilhelm von Gegerfelt (1844–1920)
- Felix Gmelin (born 1963)
- Isaac Hirsche Grünewald (1889–1946)
- Maria Johanna Görtz (1783–1853)

== H ==
- Axel Haig (1835–1921)
- Amalia von Helvig (1776–1831)
- Olof Hermelin (1827–1913)
- Otto Hesselbom (1848–1913)
- Anna Maria Hilfeling (1713–1783)
- Carl Fredrik Hill (1849–1911)
- Hanna Hirsch-Pauli (1864–1940)
- Sigrid Hjertén (1885–1948)
- Bror Hjorth (1894–1968)
- Olle Hjortzberg (1872–1959)
- Johan Fredrik Höckert (1826–1866)
- Tora Vega Holmström (1880–1967)

== I ==
- Sven Inge (1935–2008)
- Arne Isacsson (1917–2010)
- Karl Isakson (1878–1922)
- Helena Sophia Isberg (1819–1875)

== J ==
- Eugène Jansson (1862–1915)
- August Jernberg (1826–1896)
- Einar Jolin (1890–1976)
- Arvid Jorm (1892–1964)
- Ernst Josephson (1851–1906)
- Daniel Jouseff (born 1975)

== K ==
- Hilma af Klint (1862–1944)
- Per Krafft the Elder (1724–1793)
- Per Krafft the Younger (1777–1863)
- Wilhelmina Krafft (1778–1828)
- Nils Kreuger (1858–1930)
- Julius Kronberg (1850–1921)
- Hans Krondahl (1929–2018)
- Johan Krouthén (1859–1932)

== L ==
- Niclas Lafrensen (1737–1807)
- Olle Langert (1924–2016)
- Carl Larsson (1859–1928)
- Bruno Liljefors (1860–1939)
- Amalia Lindegren (1814–1891)
- Arvid Mauritz Lindström (1849–1923)
- Bengt Lindström (1925–2008)
- Louise Lidströmer (born 1948)
- Sven Ljungberg (1913–2010)
- Jonas Lundh (born 1965)
- Evert Lundquist (1904–1994)
- Torsten Löwgren (1903–1991)

== M ==
- Elias Martin (1739–1818)
- Anna Munthe-Norstedt (1854–1936)

== N ==
- Rolf Nerlöv (1940–2015)
- Einar Nerman (1888–1983)
- Bengt Nordenberg (1822–1902)
- Anna Nordlander (1843–1879)
- Jockum Nordström (born 1963)
- Karl Nordström (1855–1923)
- Max Magnus Norman (born 1973)

== O ==
- Bengtolle Oldinger (1911–1988)
- Allan Österlind (1855–1938)
- John Österlund (1875–1953)
- Bernhard Österman (1870–1938)
- Emil Österman (1870–1927)
- Barbro Östlihn (1930–1995)

== P ==
- Anna Palm de Rosa (1859–1924)
- Gustaf Wilhelm Palm (1810–1890)
- Ulrika Pasch (1735–1796)
- Georg Pauli (1855–1935)
- Axel Petersson Döderhultarn (1868–1925)
- Albertus Pictor (c.1440–1509)
- Carl Gustaf Pilo (1711–1793)

== R ==
- Carl Fredrik Reuterswärd (1934–2016)
- Lennart Rodhe (1916–2005)
- Maria Rohl (1801–1875)
- Georg von Rosen (1843–1923)
- Alexander Roslin (1718–1798)
- Gustaf Rydberg (1835–1933)

== S ==
- Hugo Salmson (1843–1894)
- Birger Sandzén (1871–1954)
- Bertram Schmiterlöw (1920–2002)
- Josabeth Sjöberg (1812–1882)
- Monica Sjöö (1938–2005)
- Carl Skånberg (1850–1883)
- Sigrid Snoilsky (1813–1856)
- Louis Sparre (1863–1964)
- Joseph Magnus Stäck (1812–1868)
- August Strindberg (1849–1912)
- Harriet Sundström (1872–1961)
- Max Walter Svanberg (1912–1994)
- Roland Svensson (1910–2003)
- Johan Sylvius (1620–1695)

== T ==
- Anna Maria Thelott (1683–1710)
- Axel Törneman (1880–1925)
- Carl Trägårdh (1861–1899)

== U ==
- Urban målare (16th century)

== W ==
- David Wallin (1876–1957)
- Alfred Wahlberg (1834–1906)
- Peter Weiss (1916–1982)
- Adolf Ulrik Wertmüller (1751–1811)
- Fredric Westin (1782–1862)
- Jan Widströmer (born 1944)
- Arne Wiig (born 1964)
- Richard Winkler (born 1969)

== Z ==
- Olle Zetterquist (1927–2024)
- Kristoffer Zetterstrand (born 1973)
- Anders Zorn (1860–1920)

== See also ==
- List of Swedish artists
