= Adelsköld =

Noble Swedish family

Adelsköld is the surname of a noble Swedish family.

== History ==
According to tradition, the family descended from an old Scottish noble family. The family's oldest known male-line ancestor was Anders Hansson, bricklayer master in Helsingborg during the first half of the 17th century. His great-great-grandson, the chief judge and later vice governor of Göteborgs och Bohus län with governor's title, Johan Christian Thomée (born 30 May 1737 in Kristianstad, died 10 May 1798 in Öjared, Lundby parish, Västergötland) was ennobled 24 January 1773 at Stockholm Palace by King Gustavus III of Sweden, and introduced 30 May 1775 into the Riddarhuset as noble family number 2029.

The noble family Adelsköld is of the same agnatic origin as the Swedish commoner family Thomæus.

== Notable family members ==
- Claes Adelsköld (1824–1907), Swedish civil engineer, officer, politician
- Carl Gabriel Adelsköld (1830–1914), Swedish painter
- Karin Adelsköld (born 1973), Swedish stand-up comedian and television presenter
