= Skånberg =

Skånberg is a Swedish surname. Notable people with the surname include:

- Carl Skånberg (1850–1883), Swedish painter
- Tuve Skånberg (born 1956), Swedish politician
