= Claes Adelsköld =

Swedish engineer, author, Army officer and politician

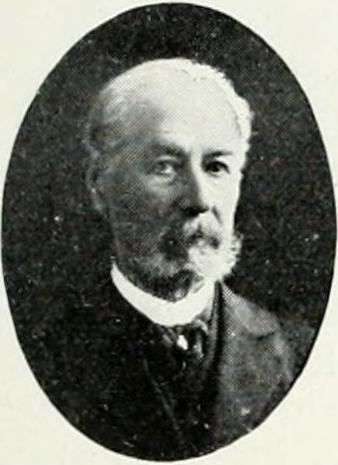
- Born: Claes Adolf Adelsköld; 7 September 1824; Nolhaga, Alingsås Municipality, Västra Götaland County
- Died: 1 October 1907 (aged 83) Stockholm
- Resting place: Stadskyrkogården, Alingsås
- Citizenship: Swedish

Claes Adolf Adelsköld (7 September 1824 – 1 October 1907) was a Swedish civil engineer, railway engineer, author, Army officer and member of the upper house of the Parliament of Sweden.

== Background ==
Adelsköld was born at Nolhaga in Alingsås Municipality in Västra Götaland County, Sweden. He was as a member of the noble Adelsköld family. His brother Carl Gabriel Adelsköld (1830–1914) was a noted painter.

== Military and engineering ==
He studied at Chalmers University of Technology in Gothenburg, serving in the Swedish Army's Göta Artillery Regiment and became a lieutenant in 1844 in the Värmland jäger regiment; in 1849 he participated in the creation of the first Swedish railway open to civilian use. In 1852, he became a lieutenant in the newly organized Civil Engineering Corps, and continued to advance in the Corps until taking leave in 1875, when he was elected a member of the Riksdag. With 26 years in railway and canal construction, in 1865 he had become an ombudsman for the Hjälmare kanal.

== Political career ==
In 1875, he was elected a member of the upper house of the Riksdag (which at that time was bicameral), in which he served until 1893: at first for Västerbotten County and later for Blekinge County. He was a supporter of free trade and showed particular interest in defense issues.

== Personal life ==
In 1867 he bought Steninge Palace (Steninge Slott) in Sigtuna Municipality, where he led an extensive social life with people that included Prince Oscar (the future Oscar II). He sold the castle in 1873 and in 1876 repurchased the traditional family property in Alingsås Municipality, where he built a manor house known as Nolhaga slott.

In 1870 he was elected to the Swedish Academy of Sciences, of which he became chairman in 1891. He died in Stockholm and was buried at Stadskyrkogården in Alingsås. Adelsköldsgatan near the railway station in Alingsås was named in his honor.

== Partial bibliography ==
- En resa till Nordkap (1889) A trip to the North Cape
- Äventyr under en resa till Bornholm (1892) Adventure during a trip to Bornholm
- Utdrag ur mitt dagsverks, o. pro diverse konto (2:a uppl. i fyra band, totalt 1764 sidor, Albert Bonniers Förlag, 1899–1901). Excerpts from my day-work (2nd edition in four volumes, totaling 1764 pages)
- Karl den tolfte och svenskarne. En historisk studie (del 1–2, 1903). Charles the Twelfth and Swedish trees: A historical study
- Uttalanden i malmfrågan (1907) Statements on the ore issue
- Konung Gustaf Eriksson Wasa (1907) King Gustav Eriksson Vasa
