= Body activism =

Social movement

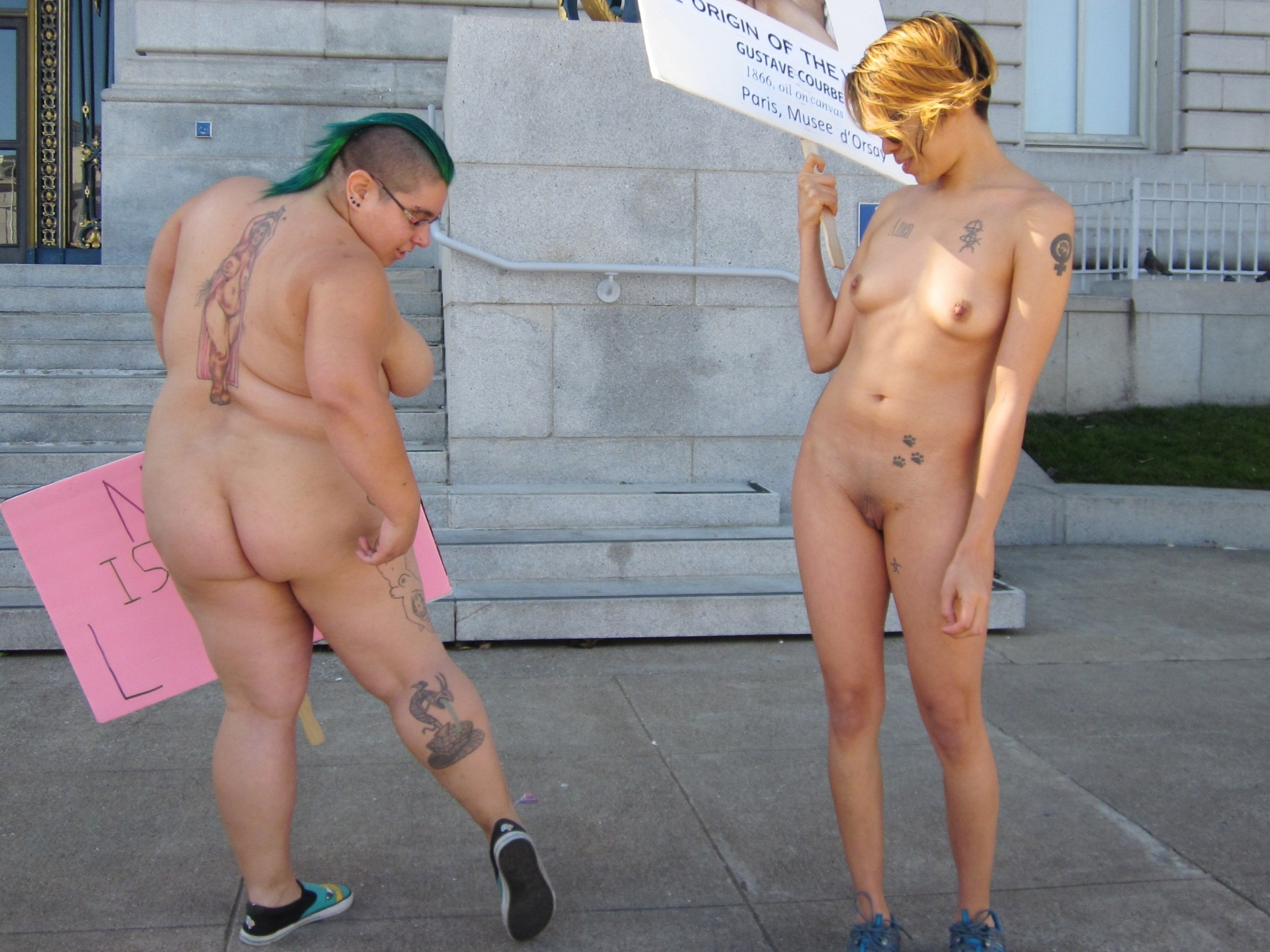
Women protesting public nudity regulations in San Francisco, 2013.

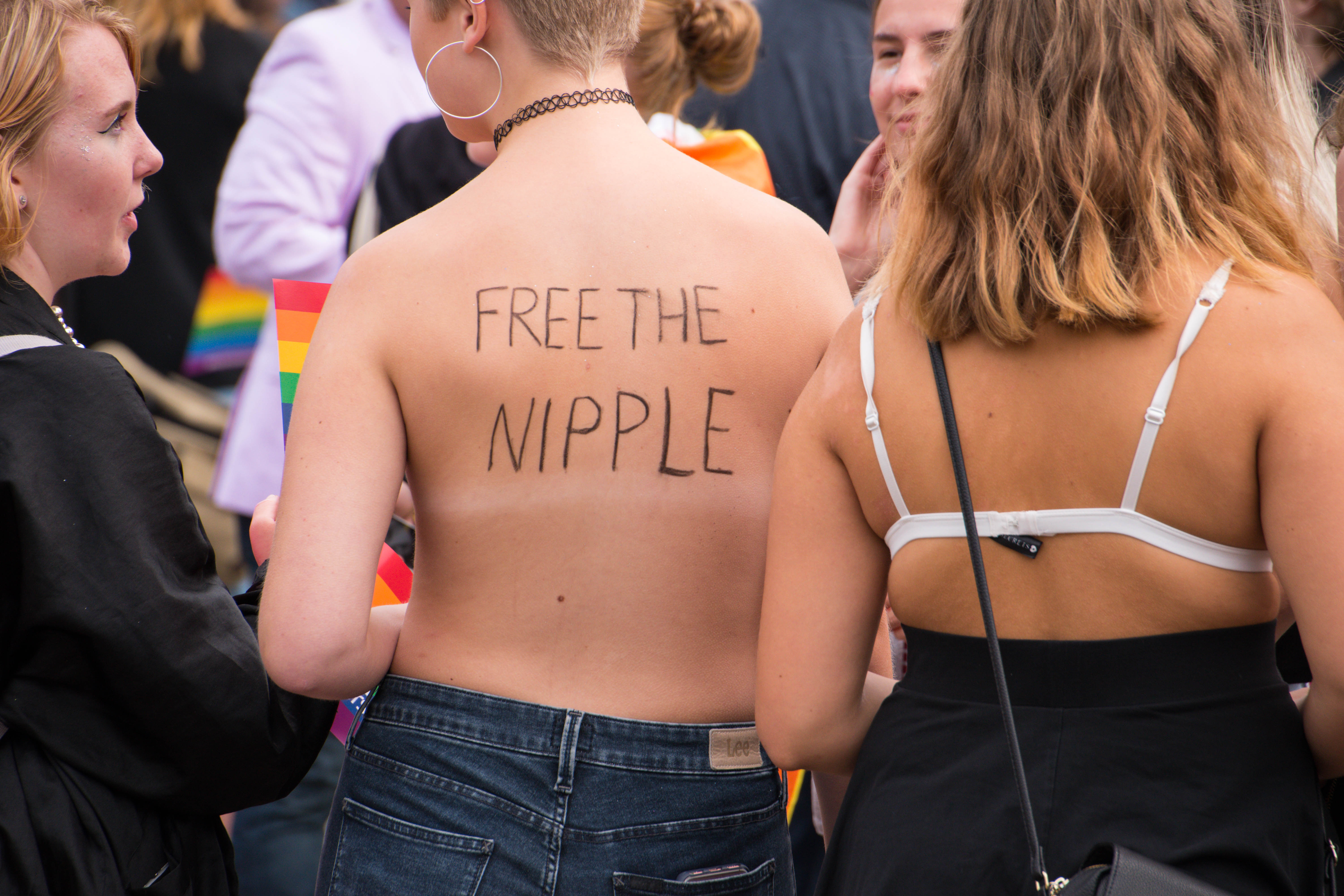
Free the Nipple Malmö Pride 2016

Body Activism (Swedish: Kroppsaktivism) is an ideology-based movement aimed at countering restrictive beauty ideals and creating equal conditions for people with different body types.

== Description ==
The term appeared on the Swedish Language Council's list of new words in 2016.

Related concepts include body positivity and body acceptance. While these primarily emphasize a positive or accepting approach to all bodies, including one's own, body activism is about taking action to ensure that all bodies are seen, recognized, and appreciated.

Body activism is part of a movement that advocates for people's – both men's and women's – right to their own bodies. It encourages individuals to appreciate their bodies as they are. The activism seeks to promote new beauty ideals and visibility for all body types. The core belief is that all naked bodies are beautiful. A body activist takes control of their own body by displaying it on their own terms, regardless of how it looks or what others think about it. A common starting point is the well-known feminist slogan My Body, My Choice.

Body activism is often expressed on social media, in blogs, during events, in everyday life, or at places such as beaches.

In Sweden, body activism and body positivity gained attention in a debate initiated in 2015 by Stina Wollter. Since then, it has received increased attention, particularly in feminist research, and has been used to advocate for equal rights for both men and women. Other people who have been described as, or have called themselves, feminists and body activists include Mia Skäringer, Karin Adelsköld, Lady Dahmer, Linda-Marie Nilsson, Victoria Bateman, Beth Ditto, Arvida Byström, Peg Parnevik and Julia Skott.

== See also ==
- Body image
- Body positivity
- Dysmorphophobia
- Feminism
- Free the Nipple
- Nudity
- Naturism
- Fat activism
