= Elma Ström =

Swedish opera singer

Elma Charlotta Ström (3 April 1822 – 14 July 1889) was a Swedish opera singer.

== Life ==
Elma Ström was born in Bro in Uppland, the daughter of farmers, and was raised in the home of a relative, the parish vicar Ekström on Mörkö. Ekström socialized with the local aristocracy and Elma Ström entertained his guests with singing. She attracted attention for her ability as a singer, and it was suggested that she perform for an expert. In 1836, she was accepted as a student in the operatic class of the Royal Dramatic Training Academy after demonstrating her ability to Isak Albert Berg. She was lodged in the pension of Kristina Fundin, mother of Wilhelmina Fundin, and friend of her fellow student Jenny Lind. One day Elma Ström and Jenny Lind left the Fundins', from which the students were normally not allowed to leave without permission, to travel around the city in a carriage.

=== Career ===
Elma Ström made her debut at the Royal Swedish Opera in 1841, was contracted in 1843, and engaged at the Royal Opera from 1843 to 1851. Among her best-known parts were that of Agathe in Friskytten. She was described as a beautiful singer with a great soprano, but her career was short and given as an example of a great talent destroyed by too high expectations. Because she was regarded as the perhaps most promising talent after the departure of Henriette Widerberg and Jenny Lind, great pressure was put upon her by the management to replace them before her voice was fully trained, which resulted in her voice cracking and her career ending before she had the full chance to develop it. She was replaced at the Royal Opera by Mathilda Ebeling and Julie Berwald.

After departing from the opera in 1851, she was active as a stage actress for a few years, but did not achieve enough success to be given a contract. She married the artist Lars Theodor Billing in 1846 and became the mother of the painter Anna Billing. She died in Stockholm.

=== Critics ===
A contemporary paper wrote about her:

"To replace them (Jenny Lind and mamsell Wideberg) was not an easy task. Mamsell S. deserves all admiration for the way she solved it. She displayed true talent in her parts without any wish to imitate."

August Blanche wrote about her:

"When mamsell Lind was in Paris [1841-42] and a replacement must be found for her parts, the choice fell upon Mamsell Ström, who was regarded to have and indeed did have, second to Lind, the greatest and most beautiful voice – yes some parties, to which the management of the time belonged, went so far as to consider her capable to replace the absent artist. The result was that Selma [Elma] Ström was burdened with a number of the hardest parts and was immensely pressured, before her voice had reached the necessary maturity, by which her voice was damaged."

In the 1850s, the journalist and critic Nils Arfwidsson described her in retrospect as:

"... a highly attractive girl and gifted with a true intelligence, a beautifully extensive and for every purpose able voice. But she was a meteor, who shone and disappeared. She attracted full houses, and the management hounded her through its entire old and new repertoire [...] for it did what it did not so much for the pleasure, which belonged to the audience rather than the then Bergmanian management, but for the full houses, but did not wish to consider the consequences. These did materialize: after two winters, the voice of the lovely nineteen-year-old singer was cracked; the nightingale must fall silent when the tones betrayed it. She attempted to transfer to the dramatic stage and did so not entirely without success but not great enough for it to keep her."

Oscar Wijkander composed a sonnet dedicated to her in 1892.
