= Stavby Church =

Coordinates: 60°00′36″N 17°57′59″E

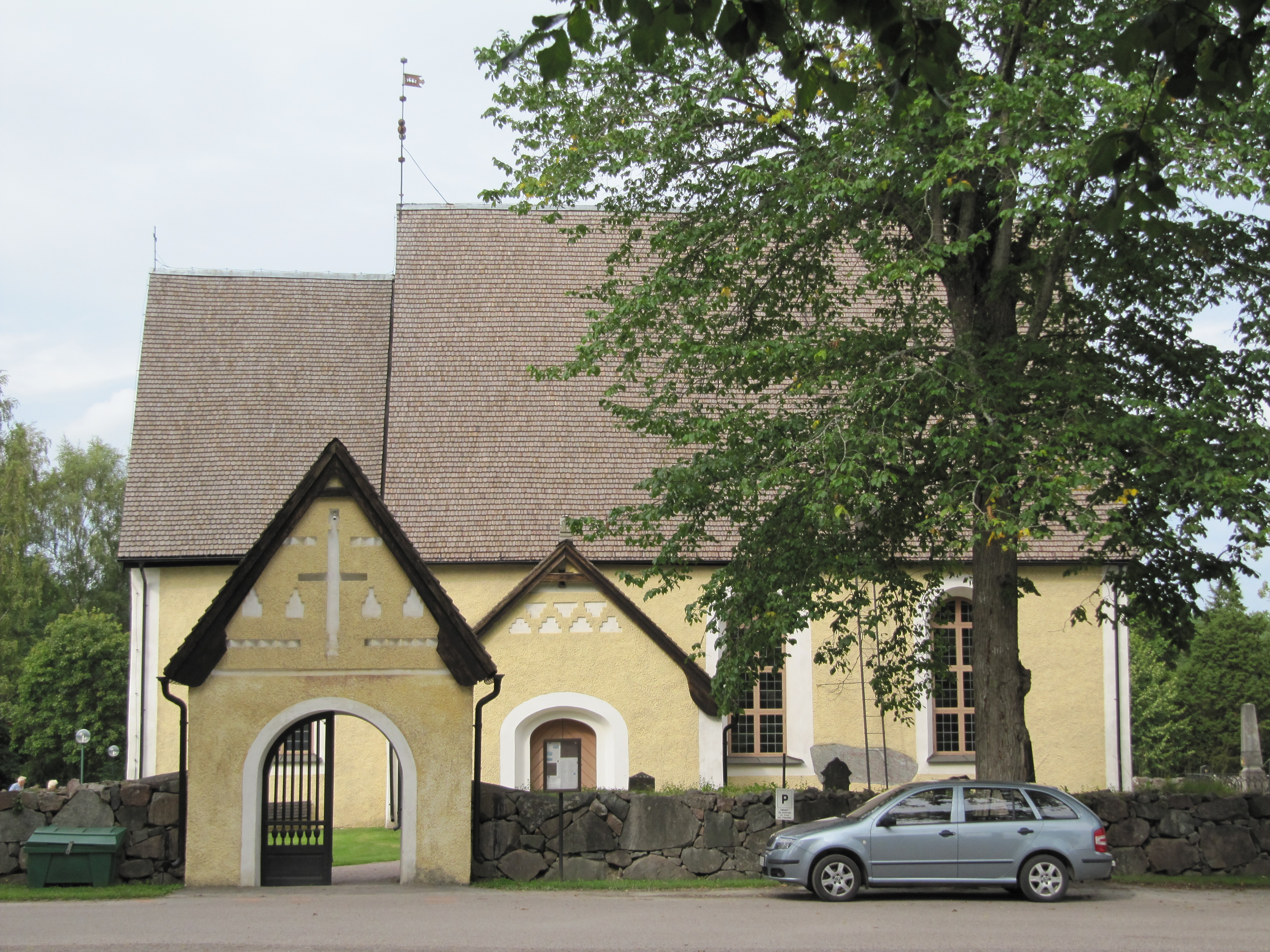
Stavby Church, view of the exterior

Stavby Church (Swedish: Stavby kyrka) is a medieval church located north-east of Uppsala in Uppsala County, Sweden. It is part of the Archdiocese of Uppsala (Church of Sweden).

== History and architecture ==
Construction of Stavby Church probably started in the middle of the 13th century with the eastern parts of the present church. A western, more narrow, extension was built later during the Middle Ages, and the church porch dates from the end of the medieval period. Two lychgates were also built during the 15th century, one of which still remains. Inside, the vaults and walls of the church are decorated with frescos made in the 1490s, probably by a pupil of Albertus Pictor; the frescos adoring the vaults are well-preserved while the frescos on the walls survive only in fragments. The wooden belfry, standing separately from the church, contains two church bells, both made in Stockholm in the workshop of the same family (Meyer) in 1655 and 1752 respectively.

The furnishings of the church include a medieval choir stall made of oak, two medieval sculptures depicting saints and a baptismal font in limestone believed to be from the 15th century. The choir has a window painting by John Österlund made in 1929.
