= Reinhold Norstedt =

Swedish painter (1843–1911)

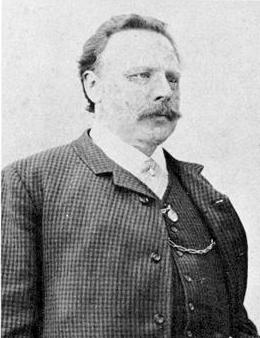
Reinhold Norstedt (date unknown)

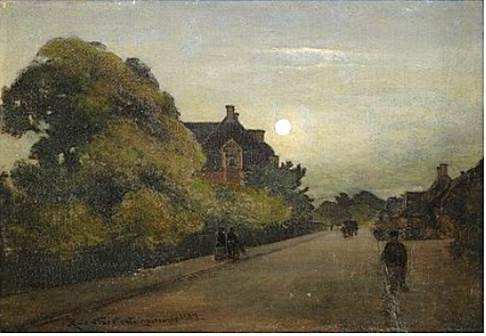
Moonlight

Johan Reinhold Norstedt (1 July 1843, Västra Vingåker Parish, Södermanland - 15 December 1911, Stockholm) was a Swedish landscape and portrait painter.

== Biography ==
His father, Christian Norstedt, was a mill operator. His mother, Emilia Albertina née Duse was an amateur musician. He was a student at the lyceum in Norrköping from 1853 to 1864. It was there that he received his first drawing lessons, from Gustaf Adolf Schuknecht.

He was in Paris in 1867 to 1870, where he studied singing, with Jean Jacques Masset, as well as painting and etching. When he returned to Sweden, he worked as a singing teacher at the Royal Swedish Opera, but continued to study art. The landscape painter, Alfred Wahlberg, encouraged him to pursue art as a career.

In 1875, he married a painter, Anna Katharina Munthe. They honeymooned in Paris, and he took lessons in croquis from Joseph-Nicolas Robert-Fleury, but it was only during his third visit, in 1878, that he finally decided to focus on becoming an artist. He was initially a pupil of Henri Harpignies, who was also a printmaker. He also took lessons from Alphonse-Charles Masson, who specialized in pastels and watercolors. The Barbizon School had a strong influence on his work, but he sought to avoid being a mere imitator. He had his début at the Salon of 1879.

In 1881, he returned to Stockholm, and would live there for the rest of his life. He became a member of the Swedish Artists' Association in 1892, and was a member of the Royal Swedish Academy of Fine Arts from 1894.

A memorial exhibition was held in Stockholm in 1912; and a retrospective in 1937.

== Sources ==
- Biography and references @ the Svenskt Biografiskt Lexikon
- Biography of Norstedt @ the Lexikonett Amanda
- "Norstedt, Reinhold". In: Hans Vollmer (Ed.): Allgemeines Lexikon der Bildenden Künstler von der Antike bis zur Gegenwart, Vol.25: Moehring–Olivié. E. A. Seemann, Leipzig 1931, pg.520
