= Anna Munthe-Norstedt =

Swedish painter (1854–1936)

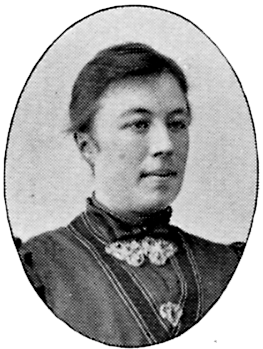
Anna Munthe-Norstedt (1901)

Anna Katarina Fredrika Munthe-Norstedt (28 July 1854 – 17 April 1936) was a Swedish painter known for still-lifes and interiors. She also worked with genre painting and portraits.

== Biography ==
Anna Munthe-Norstedt was born in the parish of Döderhult in Oskarshamn, Sweden. She was the daughter of the pharmacist Martin Arnold Fredrik Munthe (1816-1877) and his second wife Louisa Aurora Ugarsky (died 1878). Her brother Axel Munthe was a physician and writer. Her brother Arnold Munthe served in the Swedish naval military and was an author. Her nephew Malcolm Munthe was a British soldier, writer, and curator.

Originally, she wanted to become an actress, but was met with solid resistance from her parents, so she decided to become a painter instead. With her father's support, she enrolled at the Swedish Craft Association's School (Svenska Slöjdföreningens skola). Founded in 1844 as a part-time art school for artisans, the first female students were admitted to the school in 1857. She studied at the school, which is now known as Konstfack, from 1869 to 1871.

She was a member of the women's association Nya Idun, founded in 1885, and served as one of its first committee members. She then became a student of Mårten Eskil Winge at the Royal Swedish Academy of Fine Arts from 1871 to 1875. She also took lessons from the lithographer Carl Oskar Cardon. In 1875, she married the landscape painter Reinhold Norstedt, and had a daughter who died in infancy. She was advised to take up painting as a serious, full-time pursuit to assuage her grief.

In 1878, they moved to Paris. While there, she studied with Swedish painter Hugo Salmson and Belgian painter Alfred Stevens. It was during this time that she began to focus on still lifes featuring flowers. She was especially influenced by the works of the Dutch Master Jan Davidszoon de Heem, which she saw at the Louvre.

In 1881, they returned to Sweden and established a studio in Stockholm. In 1883, she had a major showing at the Nordic Exhibition of 1888 in Copenhagen. Following the establishment of an association of artists (Konstnärsförbundet) opposed to the practices of the Royal Swedish Academy of Fine Arts, she and her husband originally supported them. However they disagreed with their tactics and reluctantly chose to side with the Academy. Later, they joined a new organization that was created by disgruntled artists from both sides, but it had little influence.

After her husband's death in 1911, she moved to Helsingborg. Two years later, she married Frans Siberg (1861–1924), a veterinarian. They were married until his death. She died in Helsingborg in 1936.

== Selected paintings ==
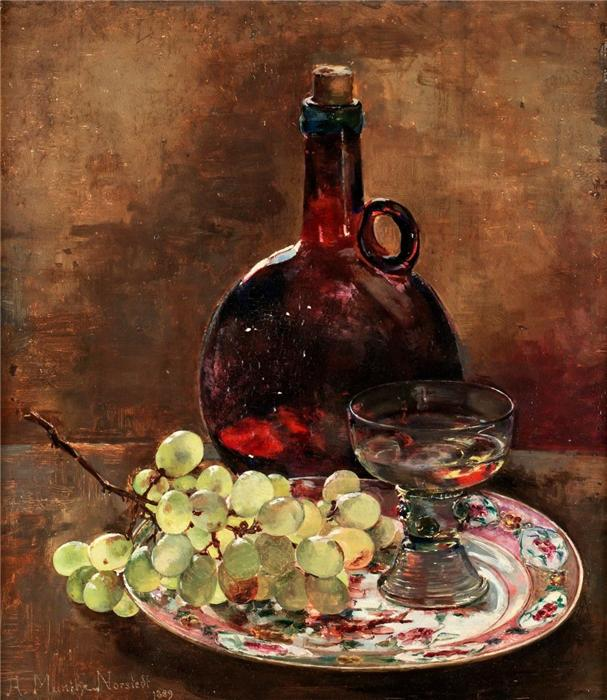
Still life painting with grapes on a plate and a bottle (1889)

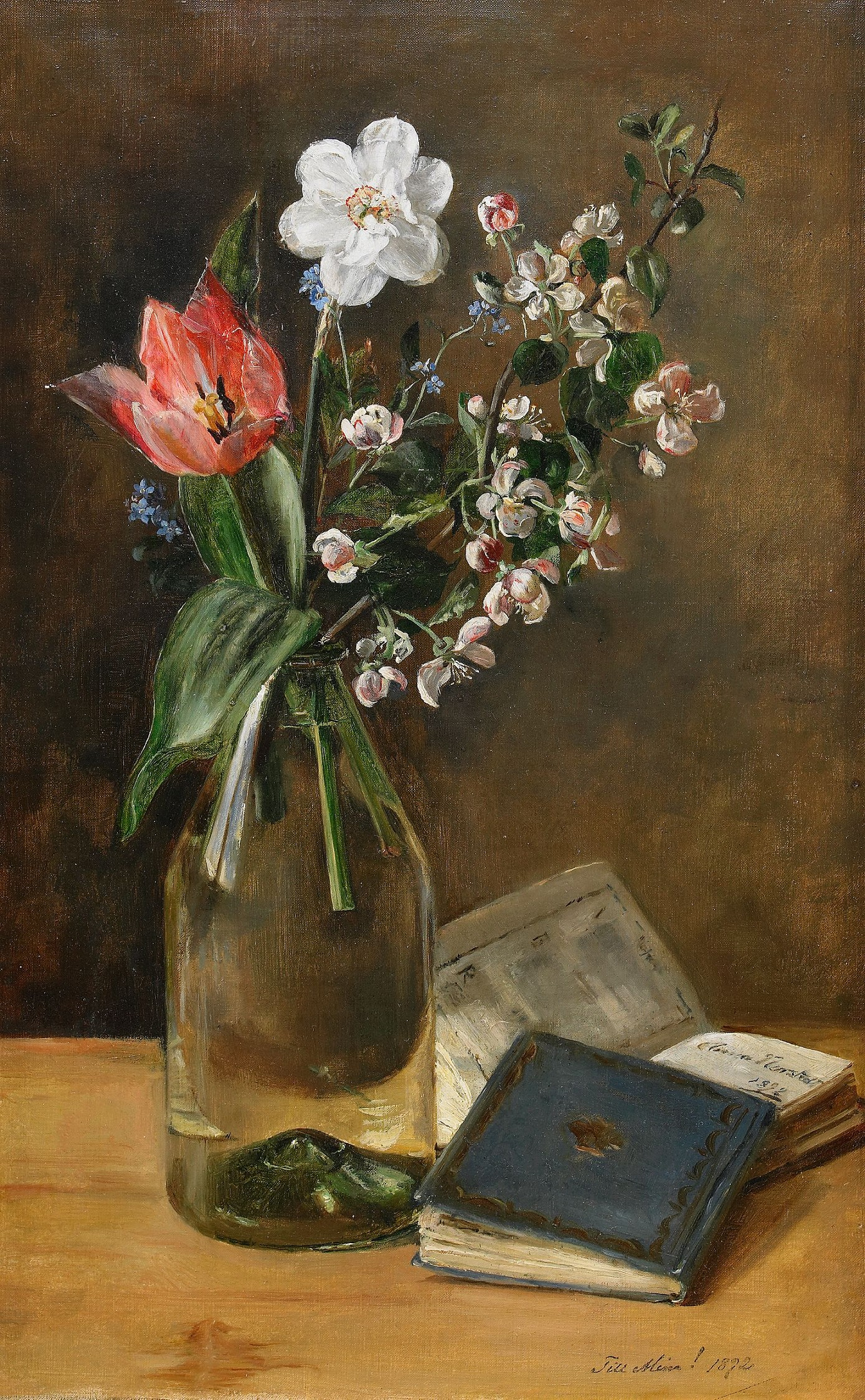
Still-life with Spring Flowers (1896)

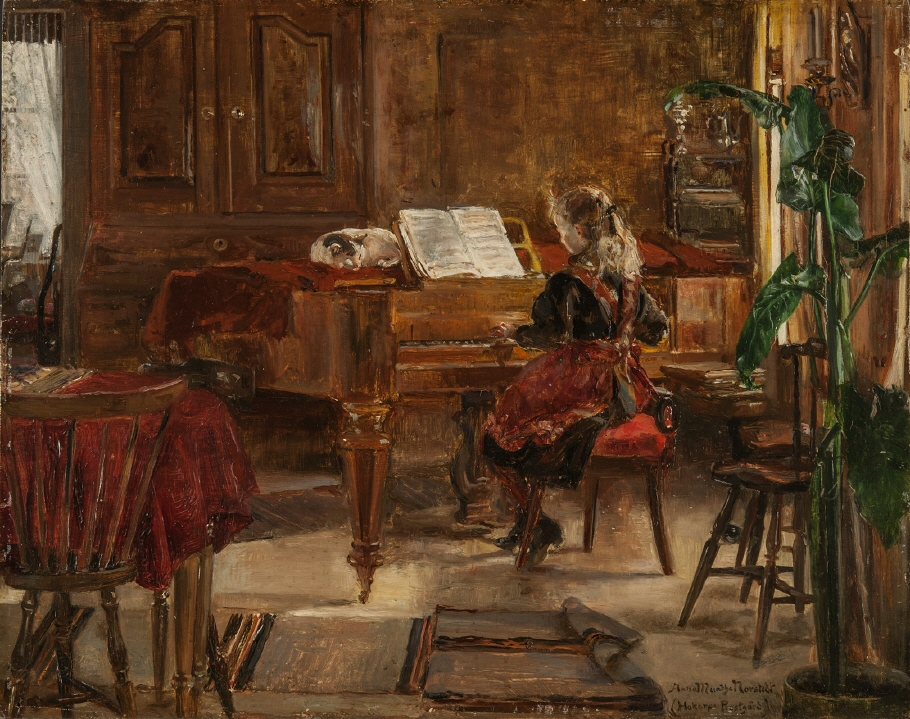
Hakarp Parsonage (c. 1912)

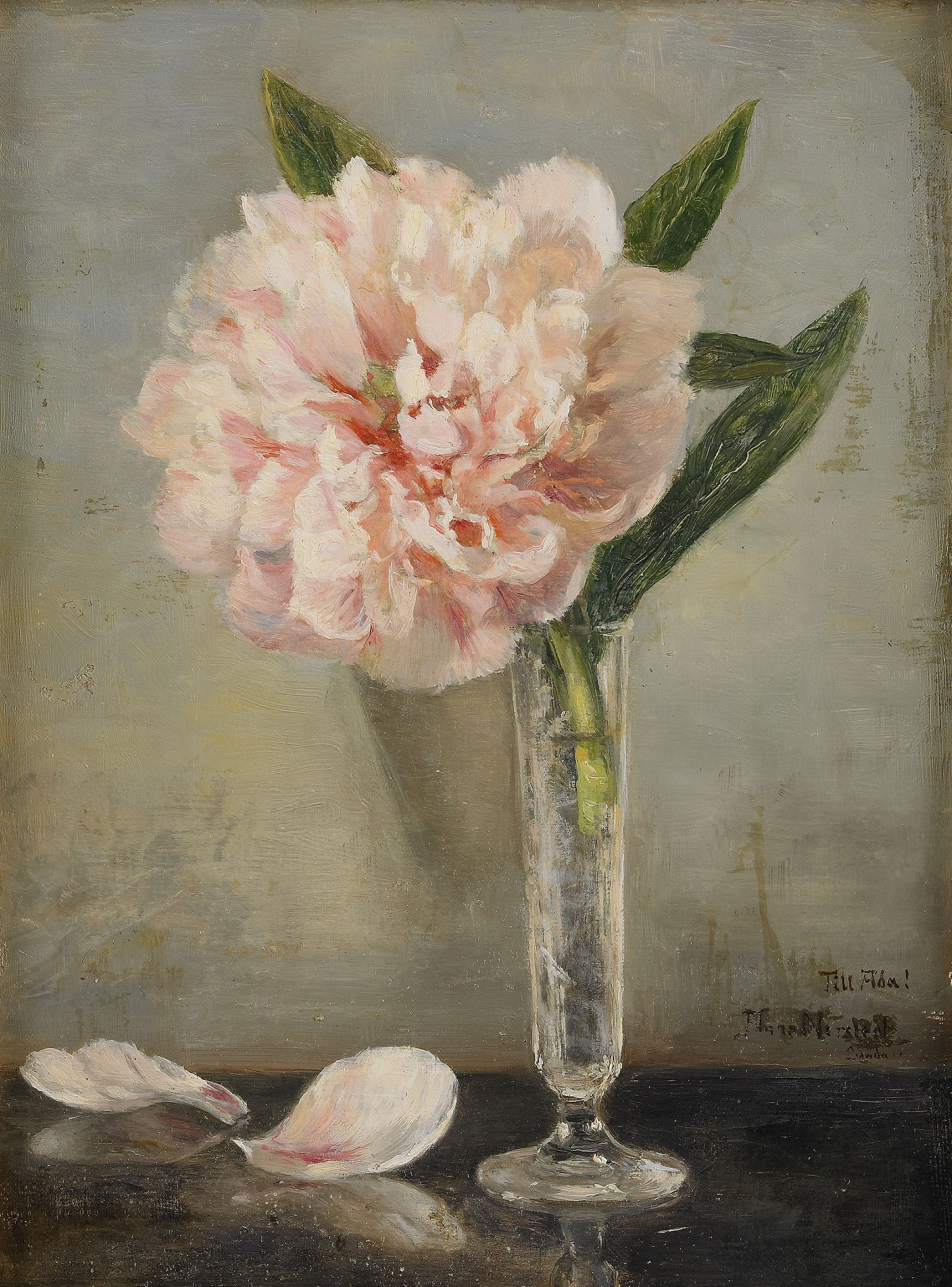
Still Life with a Peony

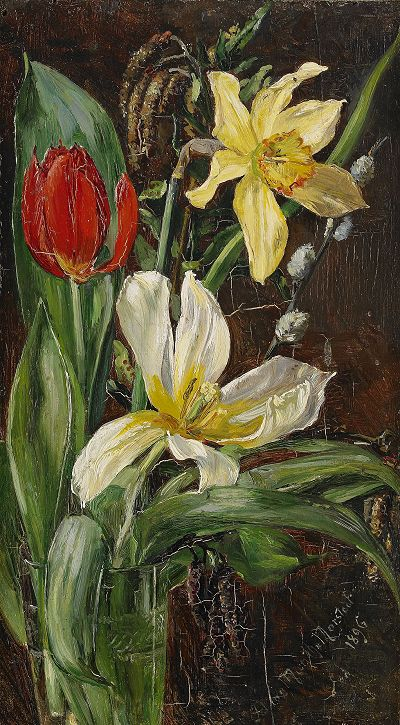
Still Life with Flowers (1896)
