= Anna Billing =

Swedish painter (1849–1927)

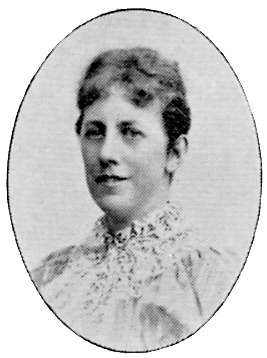
- Billing in 1901
- Born: Anna Svenborg Billing; 28 May 1849; Stockholm, Sweden
- Died: 4 December 1927 (aged 78); Stockholm, Sweden
- Known for: Painting

Anna Svenborg Billing (1849–1927) was a Swedish painter who is remembered for her landscapes and her still-lifes. After being introduced to painting by her father Tore Billing, she trained under Swedish artists including Kerstin Cardon and became a student of the French painter Georges Jeannin in Paris. She exhibited there at the Salon in 1884. The collection of Sweden's Nationalmuseum includes works by Billing.

== Biography ==
Born in Stockholm on 28 May 1849, Anna Billing was the daughter of opera singer Elma Ström and landscape painter Tore Billing. She was first raised in a highly cultural home where, as a small child, she associated with prominent figures of the times including the actor Nils Almlöf, the painter Joseph Magnus Stäck and the composer Jacopo Foroni. The family then moved abroad, to Düsseldorf, Lucerne and Paris, where she attended various schools. In 1859, they returned to Sweden where she attended where she finally attended schools where she could improve her Swedish.

Billing had set her mind on becoming a painter but her father wanted her to study music. Despite progressing in music thanks to the lessons she received from Carl Book, she received support for her ambition from the artists who visited her home, including August Malmström, Fredrik Scholander, Uno Troili and Alfred Wahlberg). After finally persuading her father to allow her to study art, she studied perspective under Johan Gustaf Köhler and later became a pupil of Kerstin Cardon. In 1880, she went on her first study trip to Paris where she was instructed by the flower painter, Georges Jeannin, returning in 1882 for a further period in his studio as well as with the Swedish painter Elisabeth Keyser.

Her early works were flower paintings in oils, one of which was accepted in 1884 for presentation in the Paris Salon, receiving acclaim from the critics. This resulted in considerable demand for her works. On returning to Sweden, encouraged by Malmström she began to paint landscapes, initially as watercolours. She was elected a member of the Swedish Artists' Association (Svenska Konstnärernas Förening). In 1897, she submitted her painting of birch trees (Bjökar) to the Stockholm exhibition. She went on to paint successful landscapes of Ulriksdal, Tegelhagen, Velamsund and Ulriksdal Palace. In addition to being a painter, she was also an art teacher.

Works by Anna Billing are in the collections of the National Museum in Stockholm and the Gothenburg Museum of Art.

Billing joined Nya Idun, a women's intellectual association, in 1887.

While Billing never legally married, she lived with her life partner Miss Berta Malmgren and was noted as belonging to a household with Malmgren and two maidservants in the 1900 census. Billing died in Stockholm on 4 December 1927.

== Gallery ==
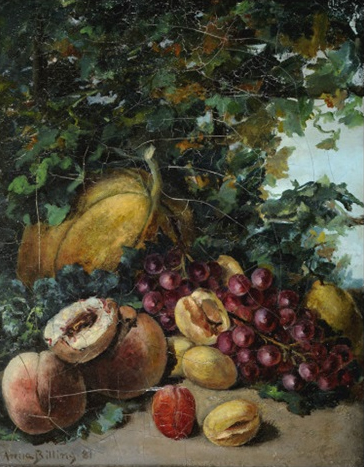
Still life with fruit, 1881

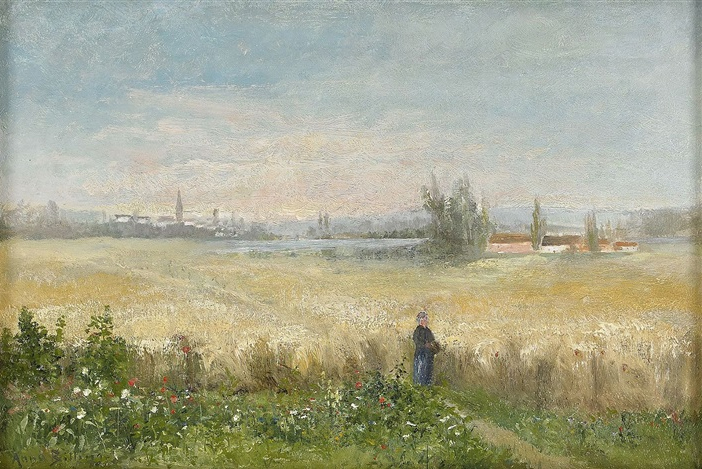
Motif from Carolles - Normandy

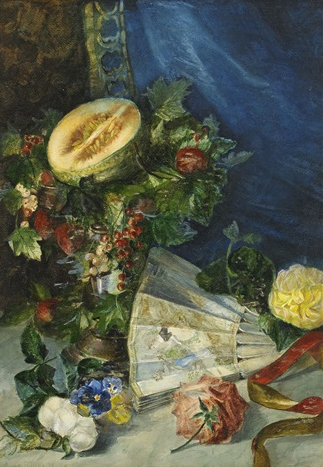
Still life with fan

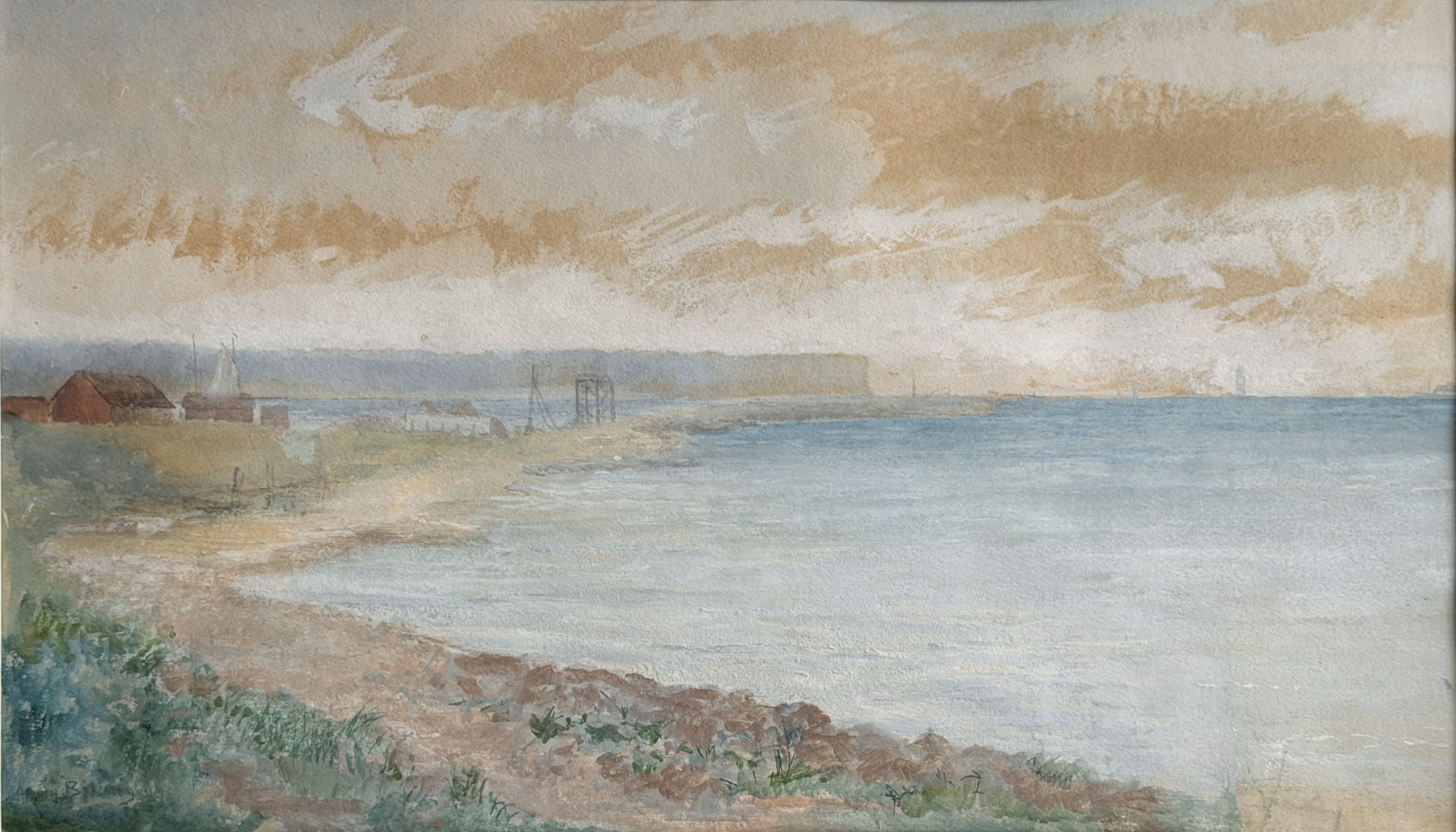
Motif from Visby
