= Isak Albert Berg =

Swedish opera singer

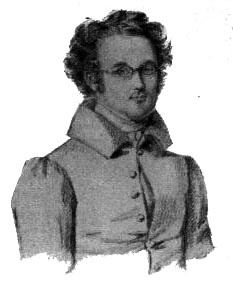
Isak Albert Berg by Maria Röhl.

Isak Albert Berg (22 September 1803 – 1 December 1886), was a Swedish opera tenor, composer and singing pedagogue. He was a Hovsångare and a member of the Royal Swedish Academy of Music (1831).

Isak Albert Berg was born in Stockholm, and graduated from Uppsala University in 1824. He was a student of Giuseppe Siboni in Copenhagen, and toured Germany and Italy in the 1820s. He was the song master of the Royal Swedish Opera in 1831-1850 and in 1861-1870.

Berg was one of the most famed music pedagogues in contemporary Sweden and the teacher of many later famed artists. Among his students were Jenny Lind, Oscar Arnoldson, Elma Ström and Mathilda Gelhaar. He also instructed Prince Gustaf, Duke of Uppland and Oscar II of Sweden.
