= Victor Forssell =

Swedish painter

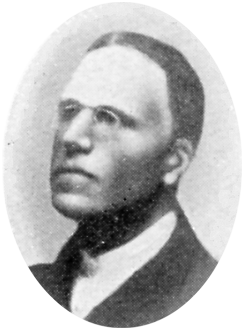
Victor Forssell, from the Svenskt Porträttgalleri XX

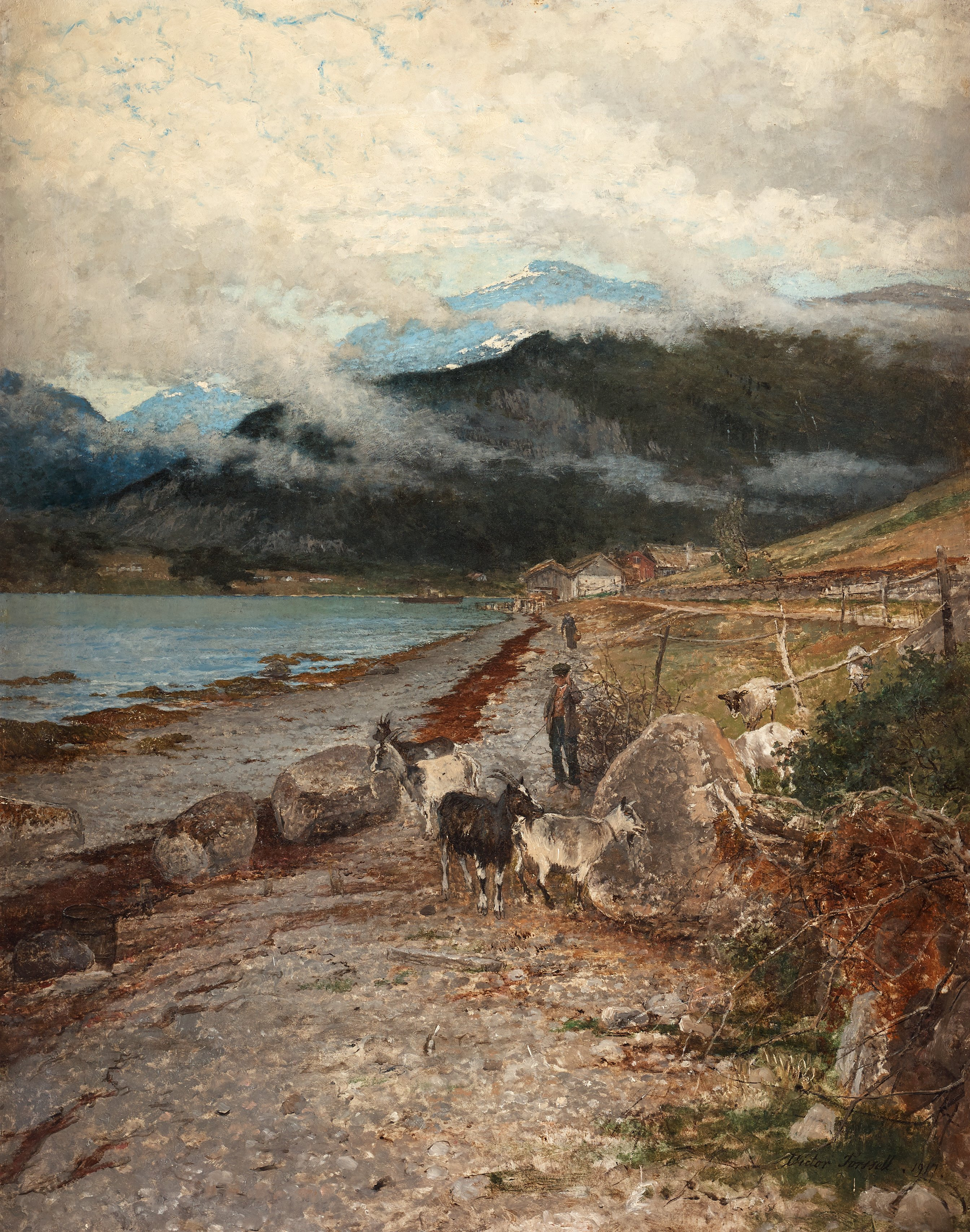
Young Boy with a Herd of Goats (1917)

Victor Reinhold Forssell (19 June 1846 - 16 August 1931) was a Swedish landscape, animal and genre painter.

== Biography ==
Forssell was born at Sala in Västmanland County, Sweden. He was born out of wedlock to Beata Forssell, the daughter of a local miller. His father was generally believed to be a silver miner. He attended school in Sala from 1855 to 1861 and apparently had some art lessons during that time. In 1865, he was accepted as a student at the Royal Swedish Academy of Fine Arts. There, he studied with the landscape painters Edward Bergh and Per Daniel Holm.

In 1877, unable to obtain a scholarship, he set off on a study trip at his own expense, beginning with Düsseldorf followed by Paris, London and Antwerp.

After returning home, he continued to travel, spending several summers on the island of Gotland with his friend and fellow landscape painter, Per Ekström. In 1887, he became a member of the Royal Academy. In the 1890s, he undertook a lengthy visit to Denmark, Norway and England. His mother, with whom he had been living, died in 1897. Seeking spiritual solace, he turned to the teachings of Helena Blavatsky and embraced the pantheistic worldview of Theosophy, which influenced his approach to his choice of subjects for painting.

In 1902, he was awarded a contract by the Royal Swedish Academy of Sciences to teach painting animals in a landscape (djurplacering i landskapen). The class was taught outdoors in several locations around Stockholm. By 1912, the money he had saved enabled him to buy a small estate, Stora Sickla gård, at Sicklaö parish in Nacka.

After the chaos of World War I had settled, he found himself virtually forgotten. Sometime in the early 1920s, he suffered a serious fall which left him unable to walk without crutches. He was eventually awarded a disability pension by the Academy and moved to Solsunda sanatorium at Skurusundet in Nacka municipality where he died in 1931, aged eighty-five.
