= Astri Ekengren-Larsson =

Swedish artist (1898–1990)

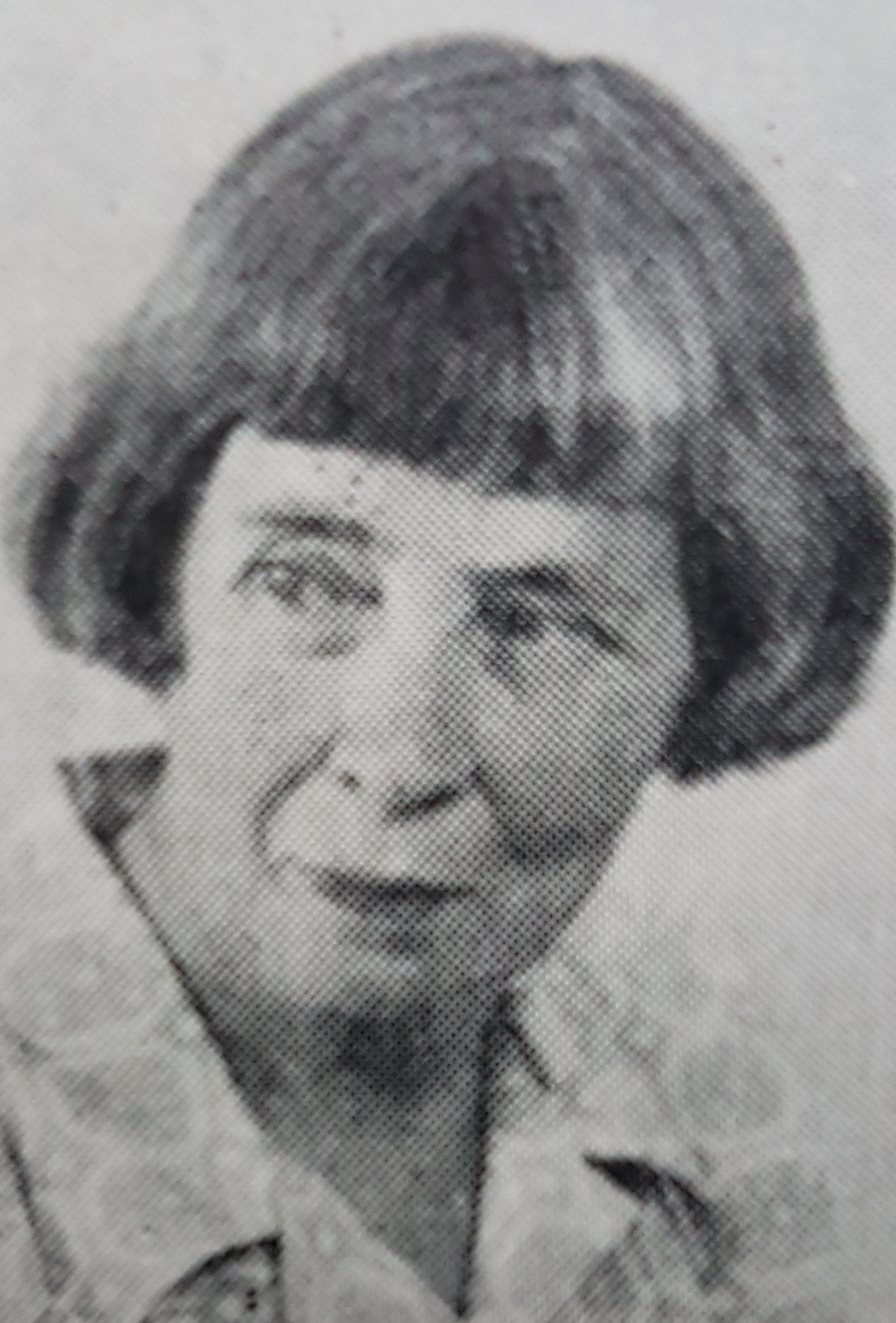
Astri Ekengren-Larsson

Astri Cecilia Ingeborg Ekengren-Larsson (7 June 1898 – 26 April 1990) was a Swedish visual artist, craftsman, and silversmith. She painted portraits, still lifes, landscapes, street scenes, and sometimes surreal.

== Biography ==
Born on 7 June 1898 in Överselö parish, Södermanland County, Sweden, Astri Ekengren-Larsson was the daughter of merchant Carl Ekengren and his wife Johanna Svensson.

In the beginning, she learned art from Märta af Ekenstam, a silversmith, in Malmö. Between 1919 and 1926, she had a craft studio in Eskilstuna and was active there in her own arts. From 1926 to 1928, she studied arts and crafts in the museums in Moscow. Between 1934 and 1938, she was a private pupil of Hugo Carlberg (1880–1943), Swedish artist and painter, in Lund. In 1940, she also learned paintings from the Skånska painting school in Malmö.

On several occasions, she exhibited her art works separately in various places including Hässleholm and Linköping, and also participated in some of the exhibitions with the Östgöta art association.

In 1926, she was married to engineer Erik Larsson (1883–1948).

She spent most of her life in Vittsjö, Skåne County, and did her artist works.

She died on 26 April 1990 in Vittsjö.
