= John Österlund =

Swedish artist (1875–1953)

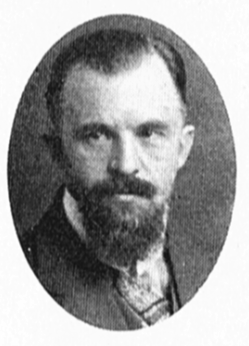
Portrait of John Erik Österlund

John Österlund (born 21 August 1875 in Stockholm, died 17 February 1953) was a Swedish artist and curator.

Österlund studied decorative painting at the senior art and design department of the Technical School, later continuing his education at the Royal Swedish Academy of Fine Arts, where in 1903 he was awarded the Chancellor’s Medal. He then expanded his studies through travels to major European art centers.

Shortly afterward, he settled in Uppsala, where he spent much of his career and completed the majority of his works. Nevertheless, Sweden’s West Coast, especially the town of Mollosund, where he often spent summers, remained a recurring motif in his art. He also developed a keen interest in Visby, which he illustrated, notably in Carl af Uggla’s book about the town.

Rooted in the National Romanticism of the 1890s, Österlund’s artistic style was richly expressive. However, he became particularly known for his work as a conservator and restorer of paintings, especially in churches. His restoration projects spanned multiple decades and included work on churches in Upplands-Ekeby (1927), Stavby, Roslags-Bro, and Vaksala (1928), Ärentuna and Skogs-Tibble (1929), as well as many more during the 1930s, such as Kumla, Tortuna, Möklinta, Huddunge, Vittinge, Kila, Haapasaari, Botkyrka, and Grangärde. In the 1940s, he restored churches in Husby-Rekarne and Torsåker.

Österlund was also an accomplished model builder. He created a model of the Tre Kronor Castle for the State Museum, in addition to models for the Swedish History Museum in Stockholm and the Gothenburg Museum of History. In later years, he was also chairman of the Upplands Art Association.
