= Olle Langert =

Swedish painter and sculptor

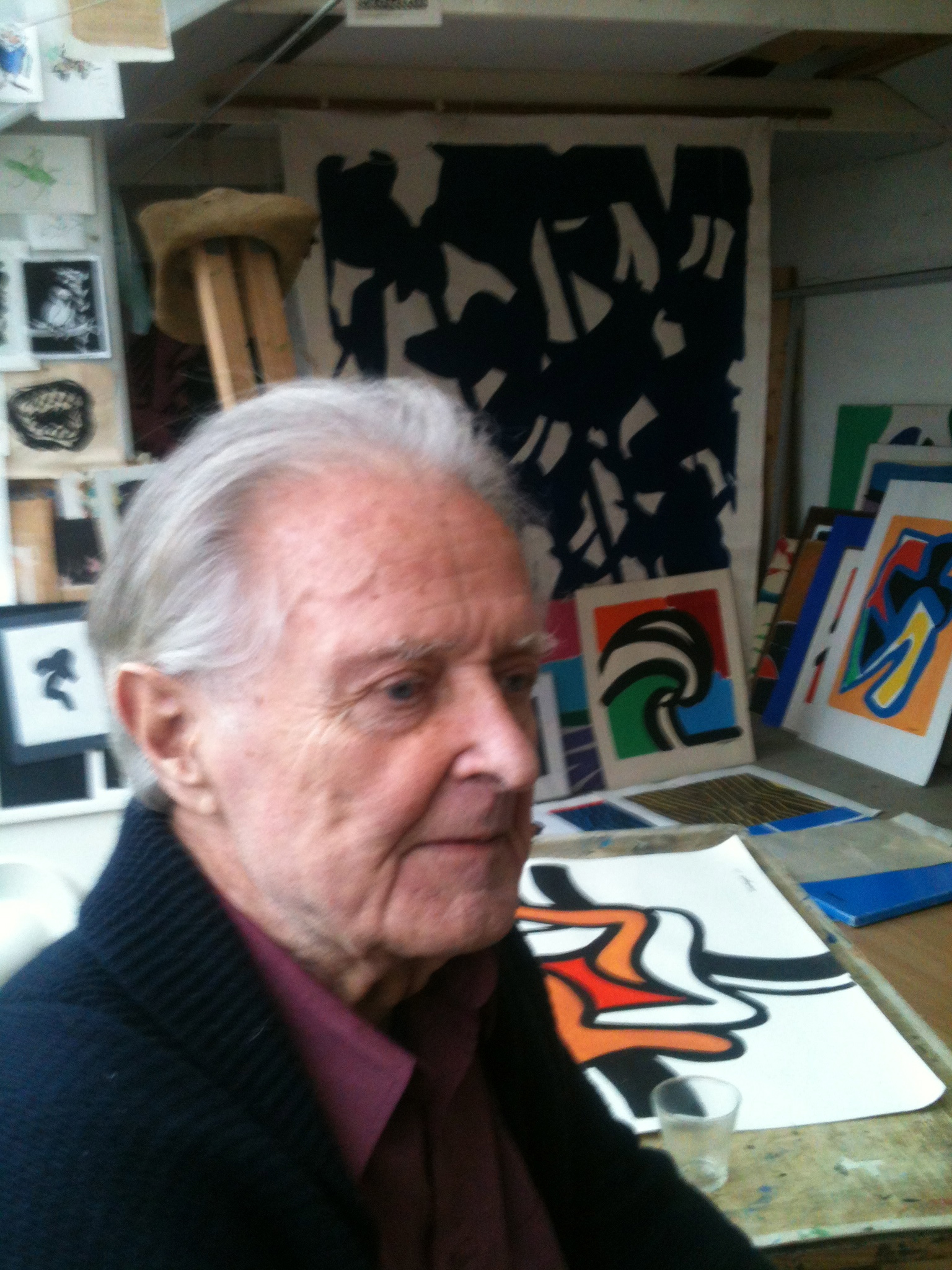
Olof Langert in her workshop in 2014

Nils Olof Langert (11 June 1924 – 21 December 2016, Gothenburg, Sweden) was a Swedish painter and sculptor.

Langert created monumental works for public spaces and buildings of the municipality of Gothenburg.

His work is represented at the Museum of Modern Art of Stockholm, the Nationalmuseum, the Gothenburg Museum of Art, Borås, Malmö, Rønne (Denmark) and the Museum Folkwang in Essen, Germany.
