= Rolf Nerlöv =

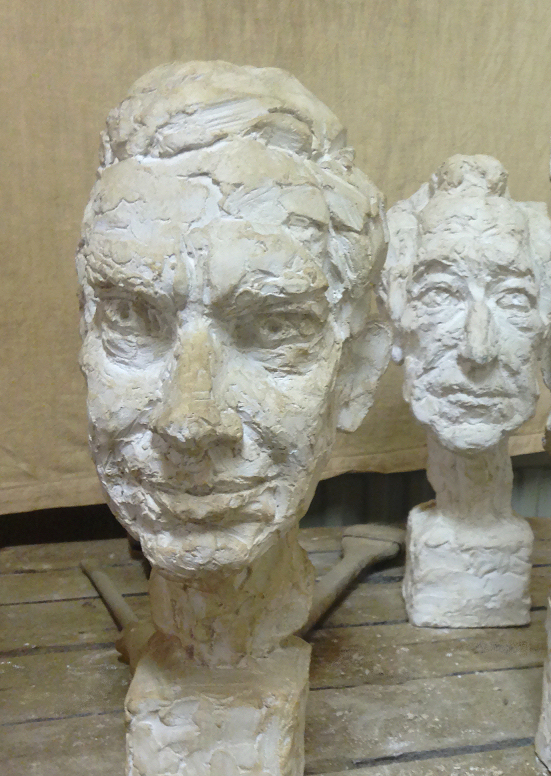
Rolf Nerlöv, sculptures. Portraits of men.

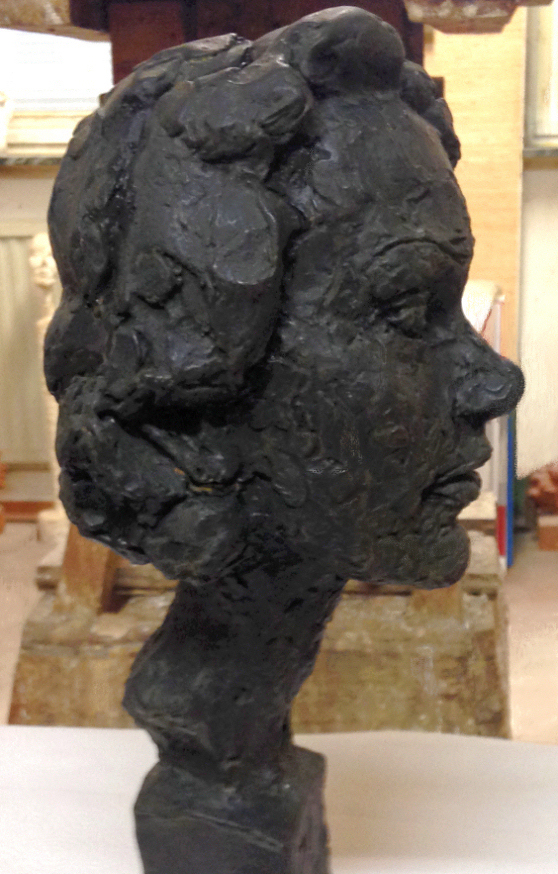
Rolf Nerlöv, sculpture. Portrait of a lady, bronze.

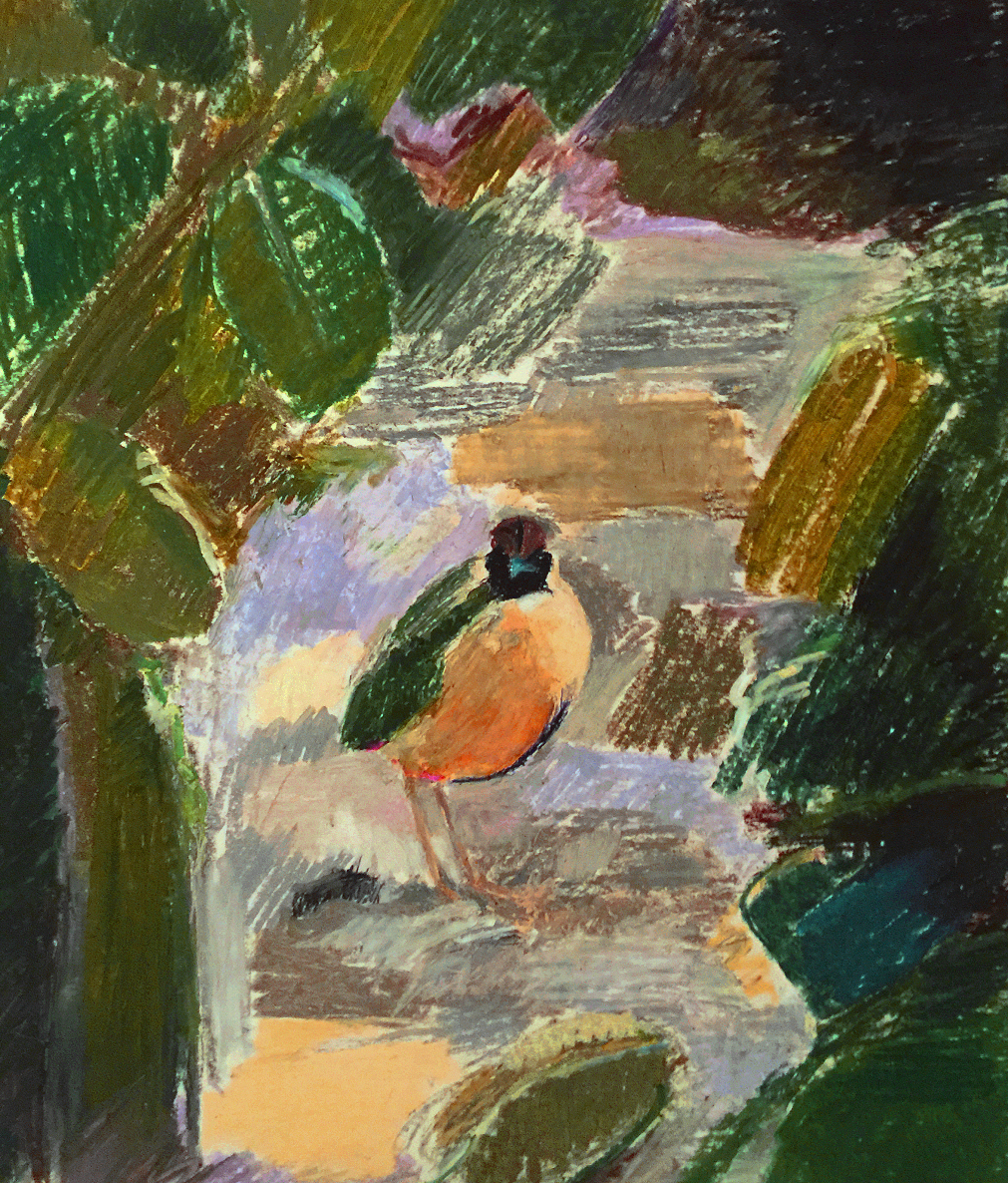
Rolf Nerlöv, painting. Bird, oil pastel.

Rolf Ingvar Nerlöv (January 4, 1940 – June 27, 2015) was a Swedish sculptor, painter and stonemason. He was born in Malmö, in Southern Sweden. When he was 11 he became the apprentice of sculptor Thure Thörn (sv) who taught him until he was around 19 years old. He was educated in Copenhagen, at the Royal Danish Academy of Fine Arts 1960-1964, under Gottfred Eickhoff.

Nerlöv was awarded the City of Malmö Cultural Award in 1983.
