= Hugo Salmson =

Swedish painter (1843–1894)

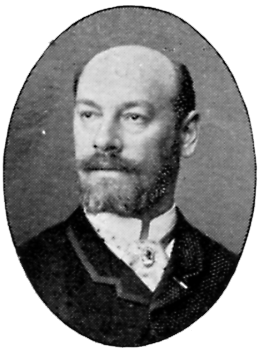
- Hugo Fredrik Salmson; Swedish Portrait Gallery (1901)
- Born: 7 July 1843; Stockholm, Sweden
- Died: 1 August 1894 (aged 51); Lund, Sweden
- Education: Royal Swedish Academy of Fine Arts
- Occupations: Artist, teacher
- Known for: Figures
- Style: Genre art
- Awards: Royal Medal

Hugo Fredrik Salmson (7 July 1843 – 1 August 1894) was a Swedish painter known for figures and genre scenes.

== Biography ==
Salmson was born in Stockholm, Sweden. He was the son of Fredrik Ludvig Salmson, a wholesaler, and his wife Maria Perlberg. He initially studied business, but soon decided on an artistic career. In 1862, he began his studies at the Royal Swedish Academy of Fine Arts where he was trained by Johan Christoffer Boklund. His painting of Sten Sture the Younger meeting Gustav Trolle in Uppsala Cathedral (1867) won him a Royal Medal and a travelling scholarship.

In 1868, he went to Paris, via Düsseldorf. The classes taught by Léon Bonnat and Alexandre Cabanel had no vacancies, so he took private lessons from Pierre-Charles Comte.

He had his début at the Salon in 1870 with a genre scene of a cottage in Dalarna titled Révélation. During the Franco-Prussian War, he lived and worked in Brussels. He maintained a studio in Paris until the early 1880s and often visited Picardy. From 1883, Salmson usually spent the summers at Dalby in Skåne.

Upon returning to Sweden, he became a member of the Royal Academy and gave lessons to Prince Eugen, but later joined a group opposed to the Academy's teaching methods (Opponenterna). In addition to the Paris Salon, he participated in a number of the Academy's exhibitions in Stockholm in (1886–1888), the World Exhibition in (1878), the Exposition Universelle (1889) in Paris, the Nordic Exhibition of 1888 in Copenhagen, Forers exhibition at Charlottenborg Palace (1879), the Art Exhibition in Gothenburg (1881), as well as Swedish Association of Artists' (Konstnärsförbundet) exhibitions in Stockholm and Gothenburg in (1886).

During his last years, Salmson mainly painted portraits in oil or pastel. He was frequently reclusive, uncommunicative and suffered from depression. He died in 1894 while staying at a hotel in Lund.

Salmson is represented at the Nationalmuseum in Stockholm, Gothenburg Art Museum, Malmö Art Museum, Prince Eugens Waldemarsudde, Lund University, Musée de Picardie, Musée d'Orsay, Musée des Beaux-Arts in Nantes, Bergen City Museum and Corcoran Gallery of Art in Washington, D. C.

== Selected paintings ==
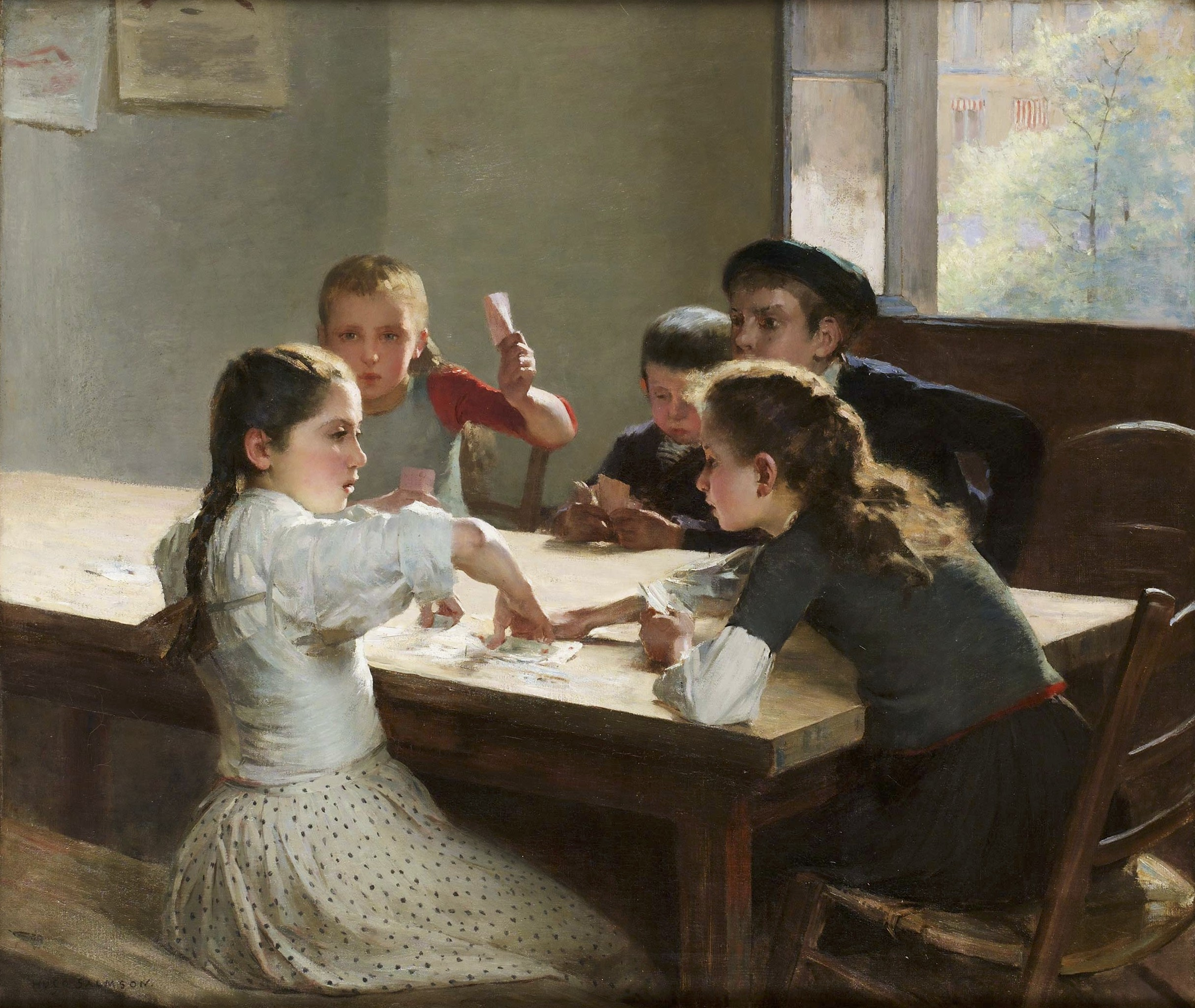
Interior with Children Playing Cards

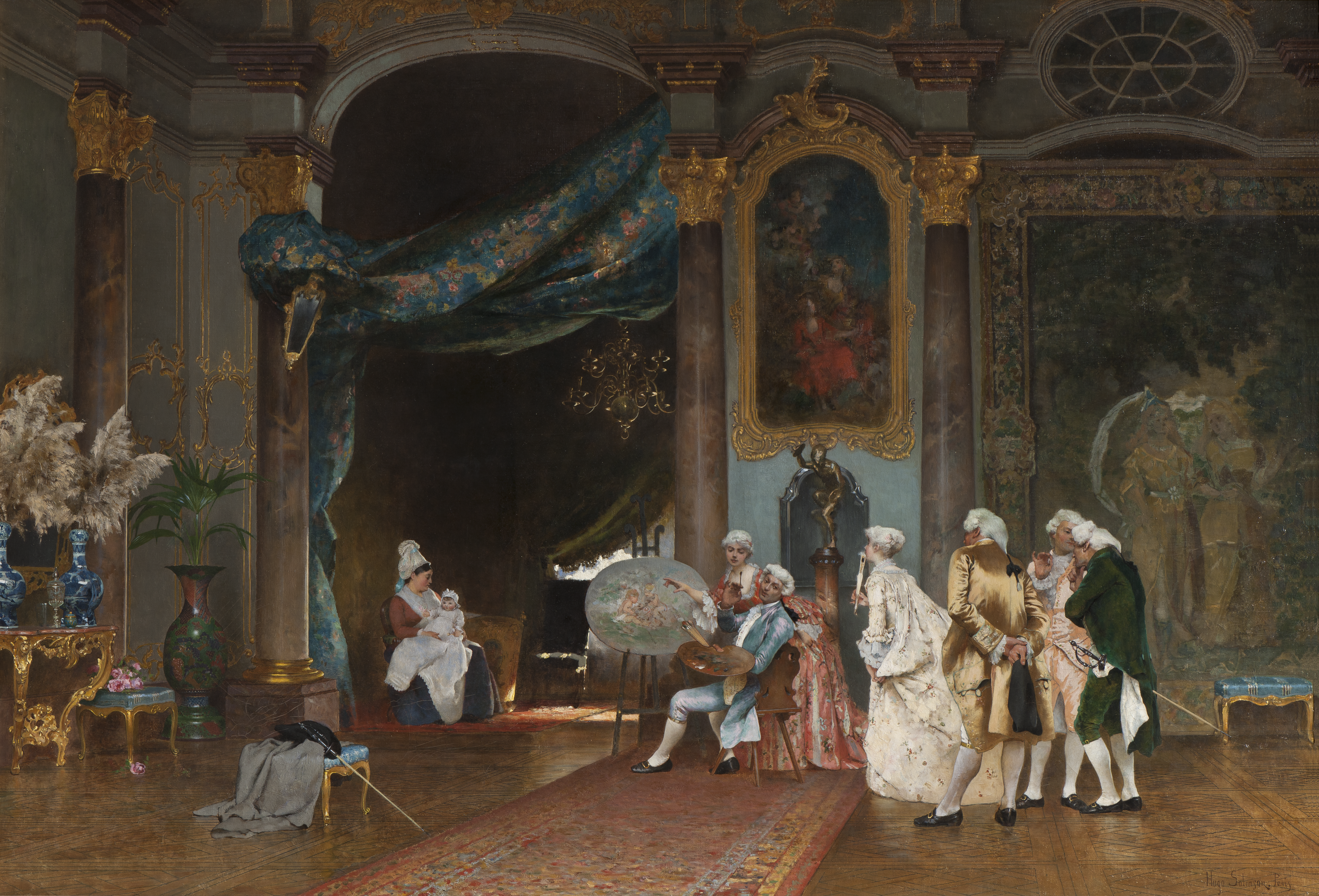
A Séance

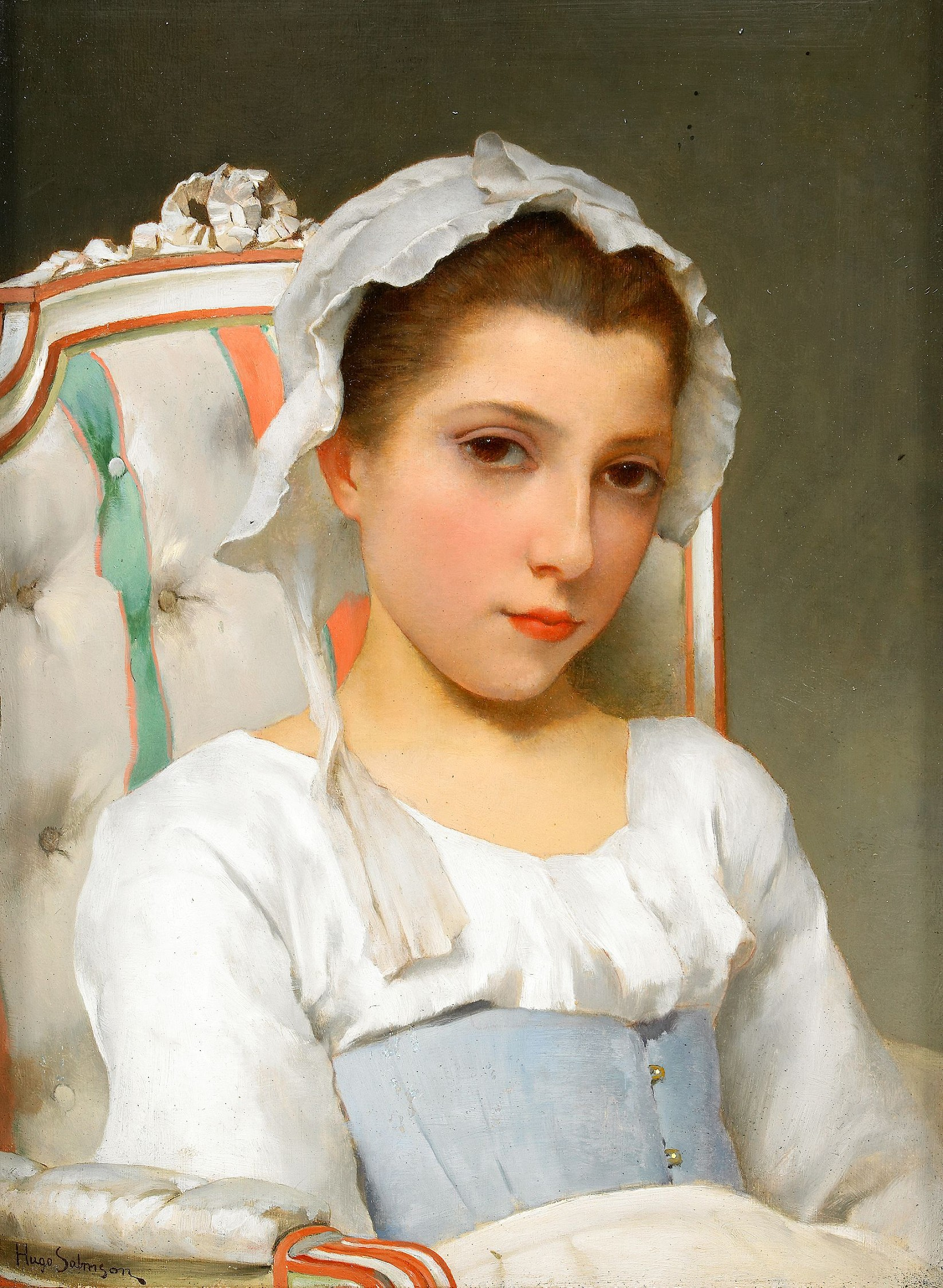
A Young French Girl

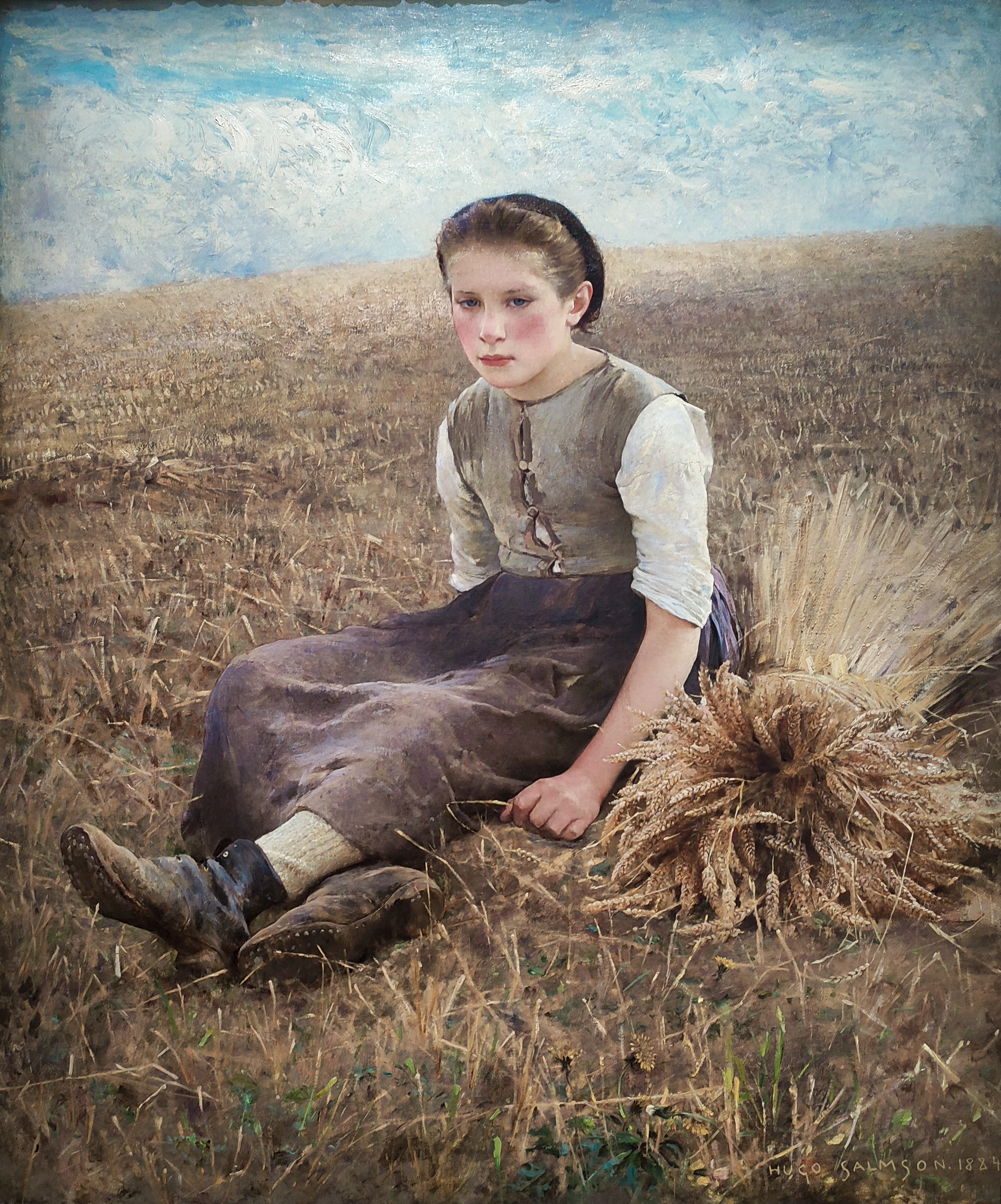
The Little Harvester
