= Karin Adelsköld =

Swedish stand-up comedian and television presenter

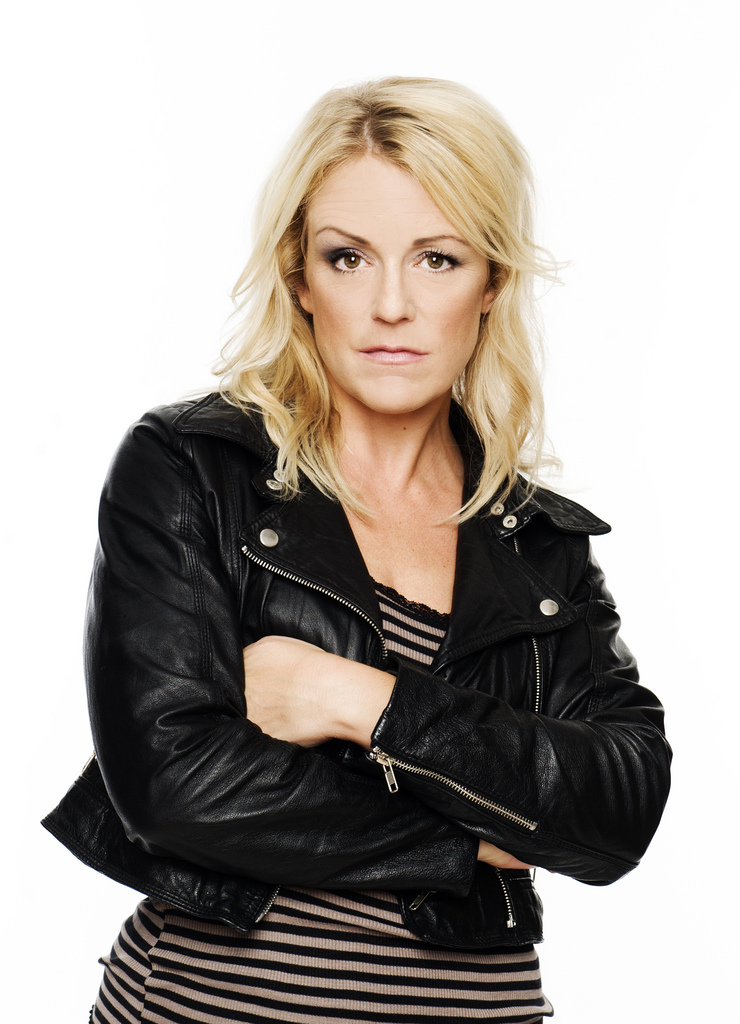
- Karin Adelsköld (2010).
- Born: Karin My Josefin Adelsköld; 15 July 1973 (age 53); Linköping, Sweden.
- Occupations: Comedian, television presenter
- Years active: 2008–
- Website: www.karinadelskold.se

Karin My Josefin Adelsköld (born 15 July 1973) , is a Swedish stand-up comedian, television host and blogger. Adelsköld was recurring in Nyhetsmorgons teknikpanel, P3 Browsers panel and operated the blog Lilla gumman.

She won "Best Swedish female stand-up comedian of the year" at the 2012 Swedish stand up-gala. In the same year, Internetworld included her on a list of 62 creatives to watch in the Swedish digital scene. In 2013, she presented Alla tiders hits on SVT along with Niklas Strömstedt. She previously hosted the programme På nätet in the radio channel Sveriges Radio P1. In 2015, she was one of the hosts of the SVT programme Plus.

== Early life ==
Karin Adelsköld was born 15 July 1973 in Linköping, Sweden. Her family moved around and settled on a farm in Kisa.

== Career ==
Adelsköld began her career as a journalist, working for various Swedish media outlets including Sveriges Radio and Sveriges Television (SVT). She has worked as host for Plus on SVT. Adelsköld is also a frequent guest on Swedish radio programmes, such as Sommar i P1 and Spanarna. She transitioned into stand-up comedy in the mid-2000s, often incorporating her experiences as a woman in the tech industry into her routines.

In 2011, she received the award for Female Comedian of the Year (Årets kvinnliga komiker) at the Swedish Stand-up Gala. The following year, Internetworld included her on a list of 62 creatives to watch in the Swedish digital scene. In 2013, she presented Alla tiders hits on SVT along with Niklas Strömstedt. She previously hosted the programme På nätet in the radio channel Sveriges Radio P1.

Adelsköld has written several books on subjects ranging from technology to stress management. Her autobiography Jag tycker det är tungt nu tells her experiences with alcoholism.

== Bibliography ==
- Jag tycker det är tungt nu. Bokförlaget Forum. 2026.
- Nu är det kul igen : från utmattning till arbetsglädje. Pug Förlag. 2018.
- Våga stå upp! : Bli en roligare talare. Ica Bokförlag. 2012.
- Bli en roligare talare. Massolit förlag. 2014.
