= Carl Skånberg =

Swedish painter

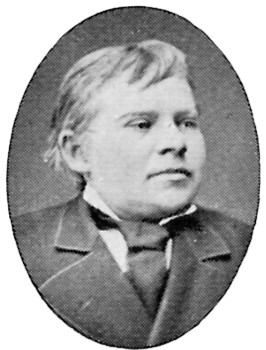
Carl Skånberg, from the Svenskt Porträttgalleri XX

Carl Emmerik Skånberg (12 June 1850 - 24 January 1883) was a Swedish painter. Despite a serious illness that caused him a great deal of suffering, he was a prolific painter and one of the first artists in Sweden to be influenced by Impressionism.

== Biography ==
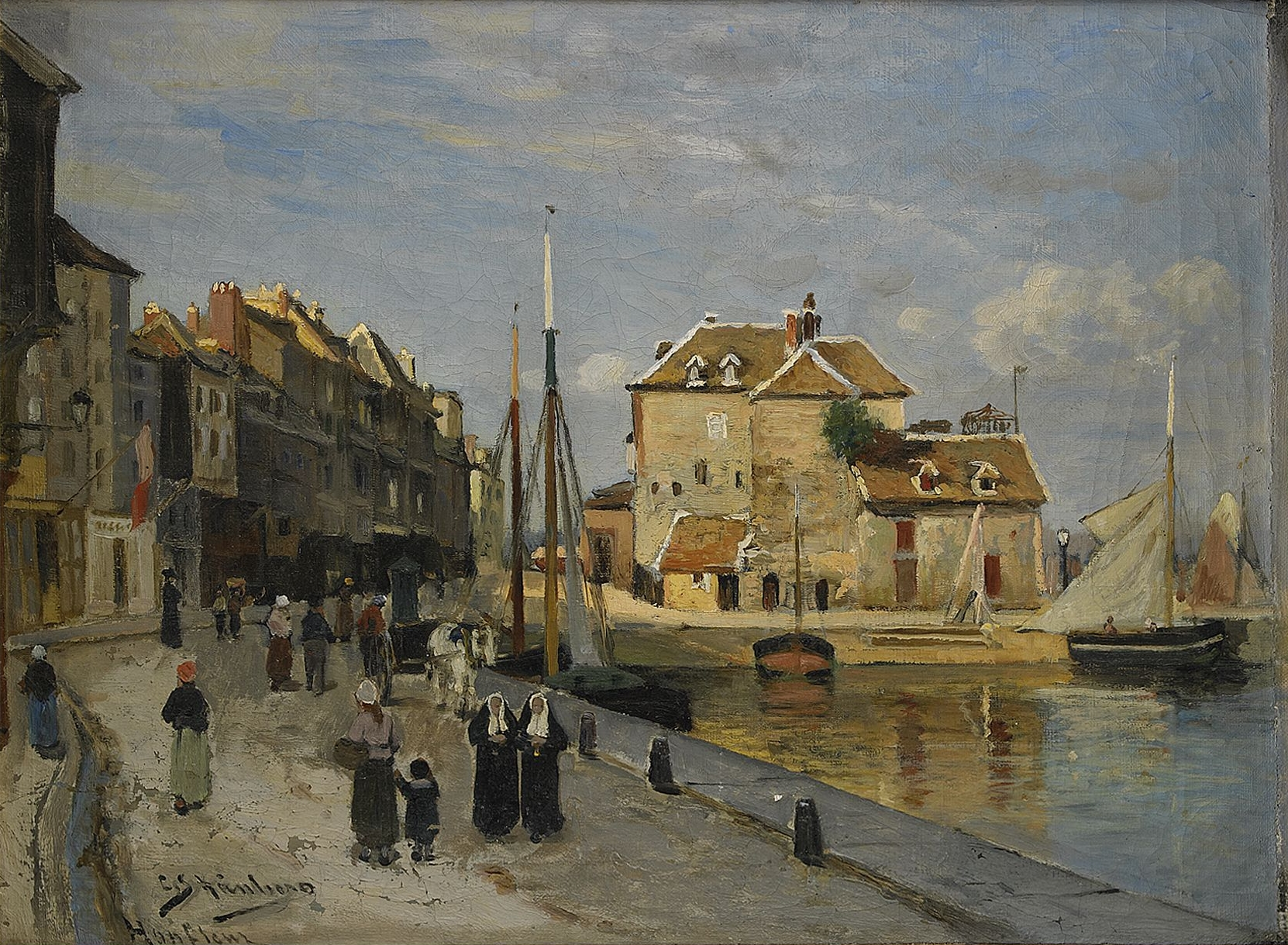
Harbor in Honfleur

Skånberg was born in Norrköping in Östergötland, Sweden. He was born out of wedlock to a maid, Emma Christina Hallbom, who later moved away to Stockholm and reportedly married a brewer. His father was believed to be a shoemaker who left town while she was still pregnant. A woman known as Madame Juhlin took care of him and he called her grandmother, although this was probably not true. A local tobacconist who provided children with school tuition, as a charitable exercise, helped him get an education. As a boy, he became hunchbacked from a form of tuberculosis which affects the vertebrae, known as Pott disease, that leads to pulmonary dysfunction and heart problems.

At the age of fifteen, he went to Stockholm, where he became an apprentice in a painter's workshop. From 1869, he attended the Slöjdskolan, where he studied ornamental painting and figure drawing. This was followed by classes at the Royal Swedish Academy of Fine Arts from 1871 to 1874. He was very popular there and made friends with Ernst Josephson, Carl Larsson (both of whom painted portraits of him) and Carl Fredrik Hill. His lifestyle was lush and lavish and he was the inspiration for a story by Johan Jacob Ahrenberg called Ungdom (Youth).

In 1875, he and several acquaintances went to Paris, where he was influenced by the works of Jean-Baptiste-Camille Corot and Charles-François Daubigny. From there, he went to northern France and the Netherlands, where he painted coastal scenes. His works at this time began to show the influence of Impressionism.

He moved to Italy in 1881, in an effort to improve his health. First, he visited Sicily, then Venice, where he created some of his best known works. He ended up in Rome and married Ellen Hintze, whom he had met at a Scandinavian social club. The wedding took place at the Consulate and Henrik Ibsen was among the attendees.

Attacks of asthma, aggravated by his smoking, led him to return to Sweden, where he received treatment from Axel Munthe. This availed nothing, however, and he died six months later in Stockholm.

His works may be seen at the Nordiska museet, Nationalmuseum and the Göteborgs konstmuseum.

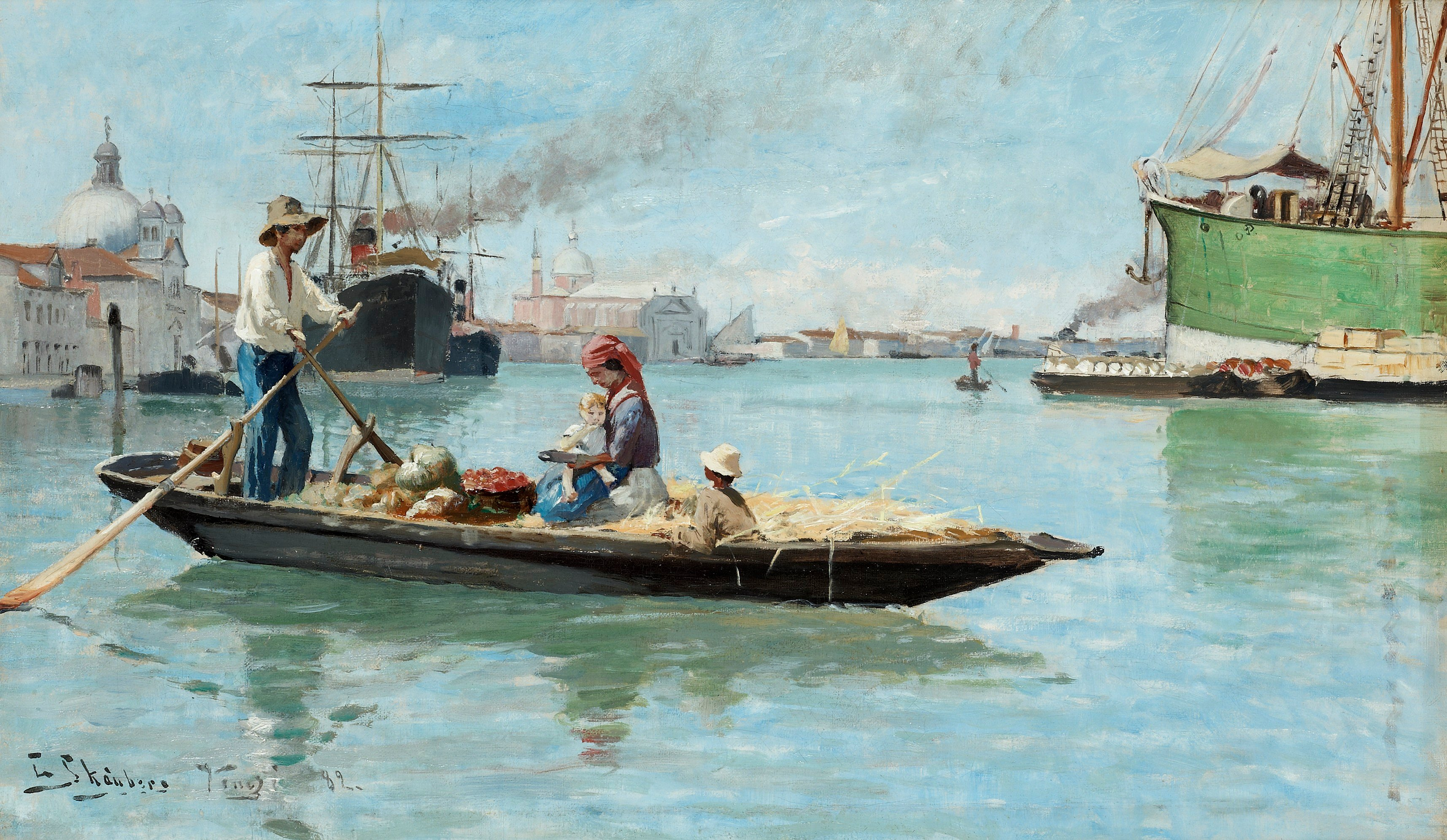
Port of Venice

== Sources ==
- Svenskt konstnärslexikon, Part V, Pgs. 201-202, Allhems Förlag, Malmö.
