= Joseph Magnus Stäck =

Swedish landscape painter and art professor

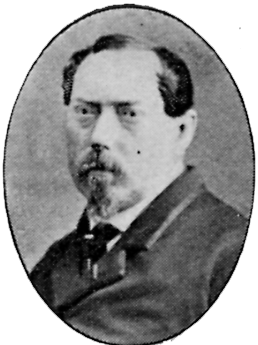
Joseph Magnus Stäck, from the Svenskt Porträttgalleri XX

Joseph Magnus Stäck (4 April 1812 – 21 February 1868) was a Swedish landscape painter and art professor.

== Biography ==
Stäck was born at Lund, Sweden. His father, Joseph Stäck was a hawker and wig maker. His grandfather, Balthasar Stecchi (b. 1728) was of Bolognese origin. The family had been known as "Stechow" and "Stächof" prior to adopting the surname Stäck. His childhood home also served as a boarding house. It was home to the painter, Andreas Arfwidsson (1786-1831) and two other young men who would become artists: Gustaf Wilhelm Palm (1810-1890) and Magnus Körner (1808-1864). His first lessons may have been provided by Arfwidsson.

He enrolled at Lund University with the apparent intent of becoming a physician, although he never joined the Faculty of Medicine. He had already passed the "Examen Theologicum" and earned a Master of Philosophy (Examen pro Exercitio) when, he later wrote, the "painter took over". In 1832, he followed his friends Palm and Körner and enrolled at the Royal Swedish Academy of Fine Arts. While studying with Carl Johan Fahlcrantz (1774-1861) he decided to specialize in landscape painting.

He held several successful exhibits at the salon of the Swedish Association for Art (Sveriges Allmänna Konstförening). In 1840, nine paintings had been sold before the exhibition opened to the public. He sold another thirteen paintings in 1843. During this time, in 1842, he received a scholarship that enabled him to visit Munich, Venice and Rome, where he stayed for three years. He also studied the works of Johan Christian Dahl, of which there were a large number in Dresden. He completed his studies in Paris and exhibited at the Paris Salon of 1847. During the French Revolution of 1848, he remained there until his money ran out, even though his friends urged him to leave.

While travelling through Northern Italy, he had become ill with what was apparently a form of rheumatic fever or malaria. The symptoms would return periodically for the rest of his life and make him unable to work. In 1852, he was named a professor at the Royal Academy and was elected Chairman of the Sveriges Allmänna Konstförening. He retained the latter position until 1858, when the increasing workload interfered with his painting and he resigned. A trip to Düsseldorf, which was then becoming a major art center, proved fruitless due to a recurrence of his illness that made him bedridden. He returned to the Academy in 1860. He died at Stockholm in 1868.

== Gallery ==
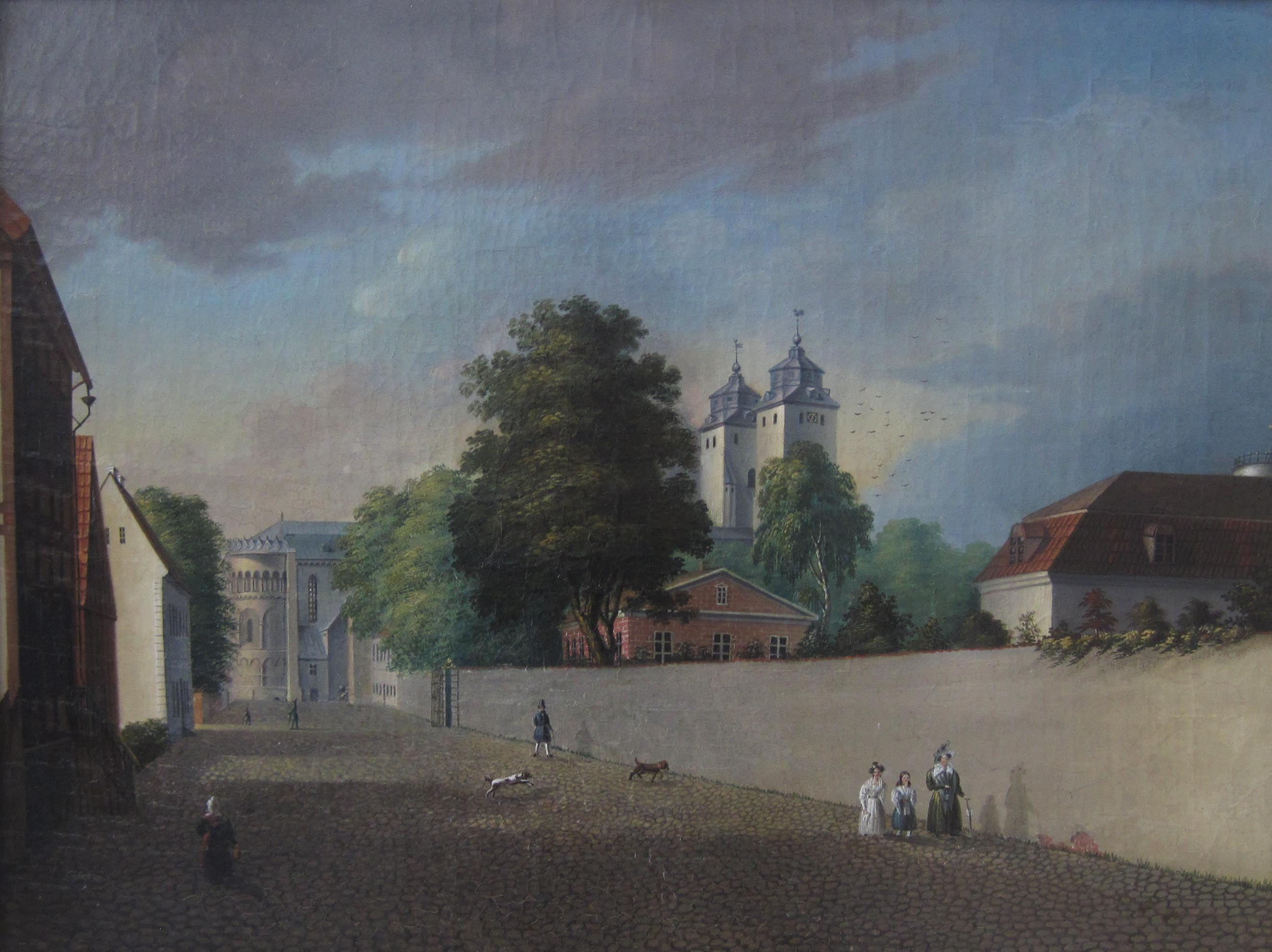
Sandgatan in Lund (1832-1833)

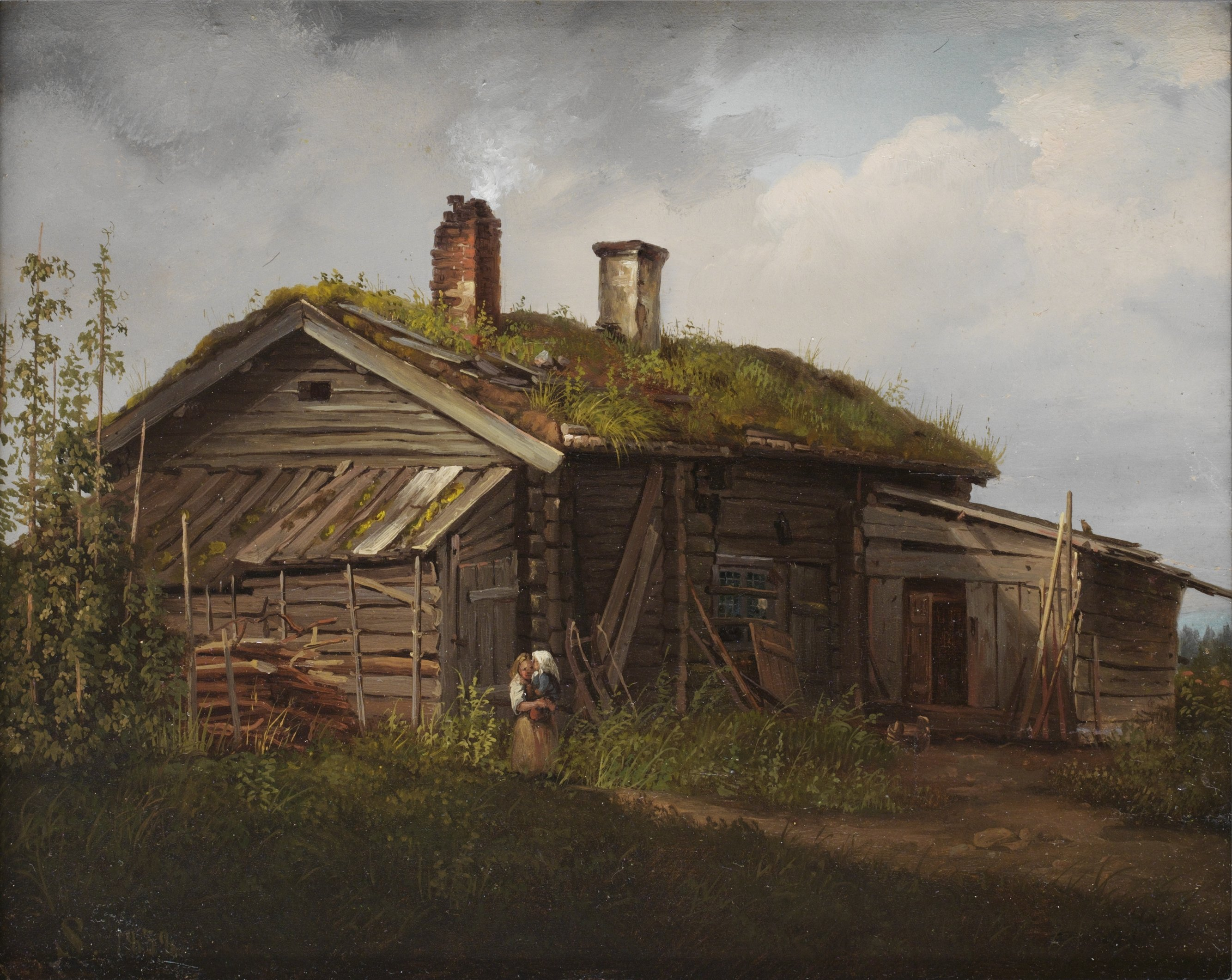
Woman and Child, Outside a Cottage (1838)

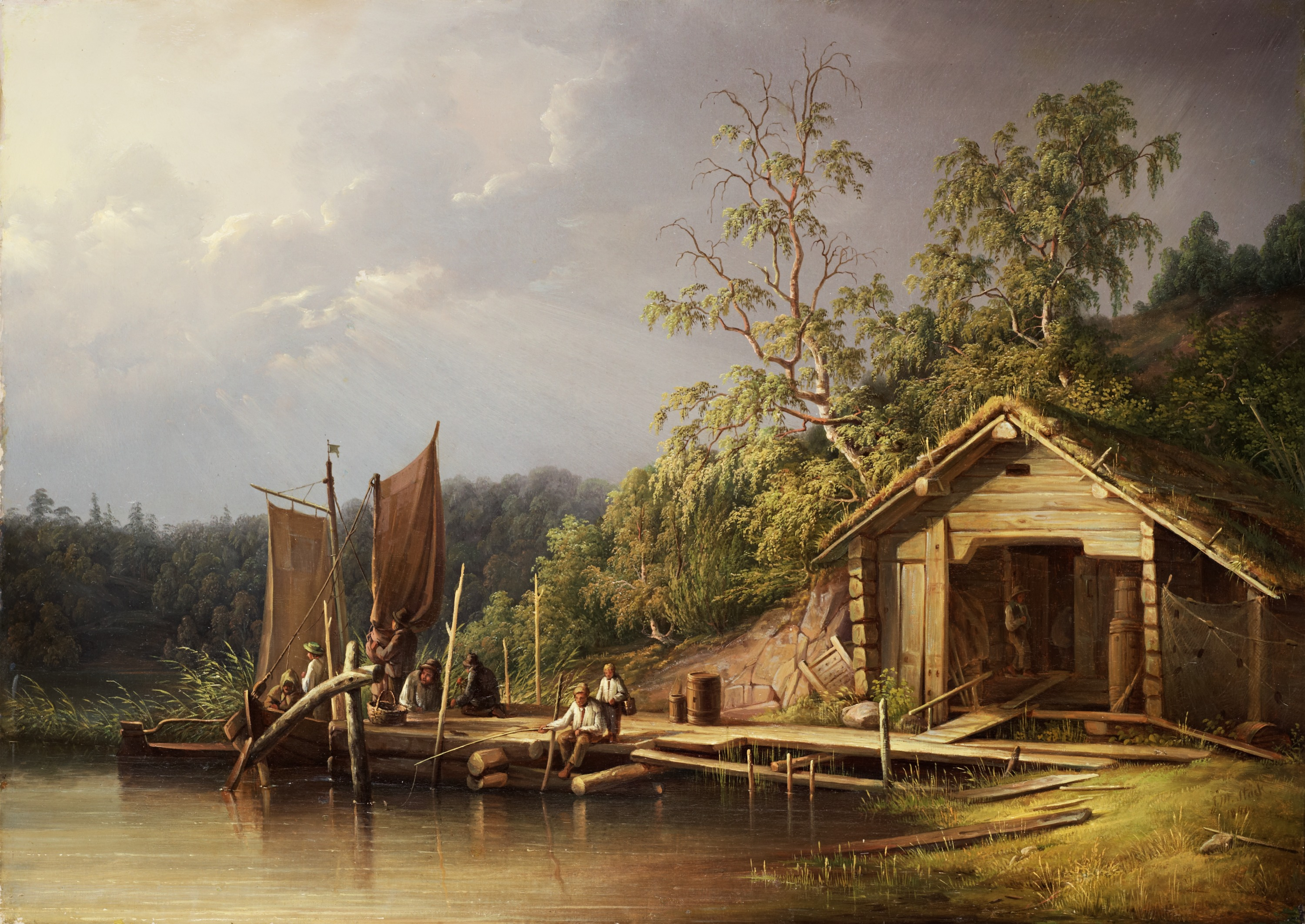
Fisherman's Cottage in Skärgården (1840)

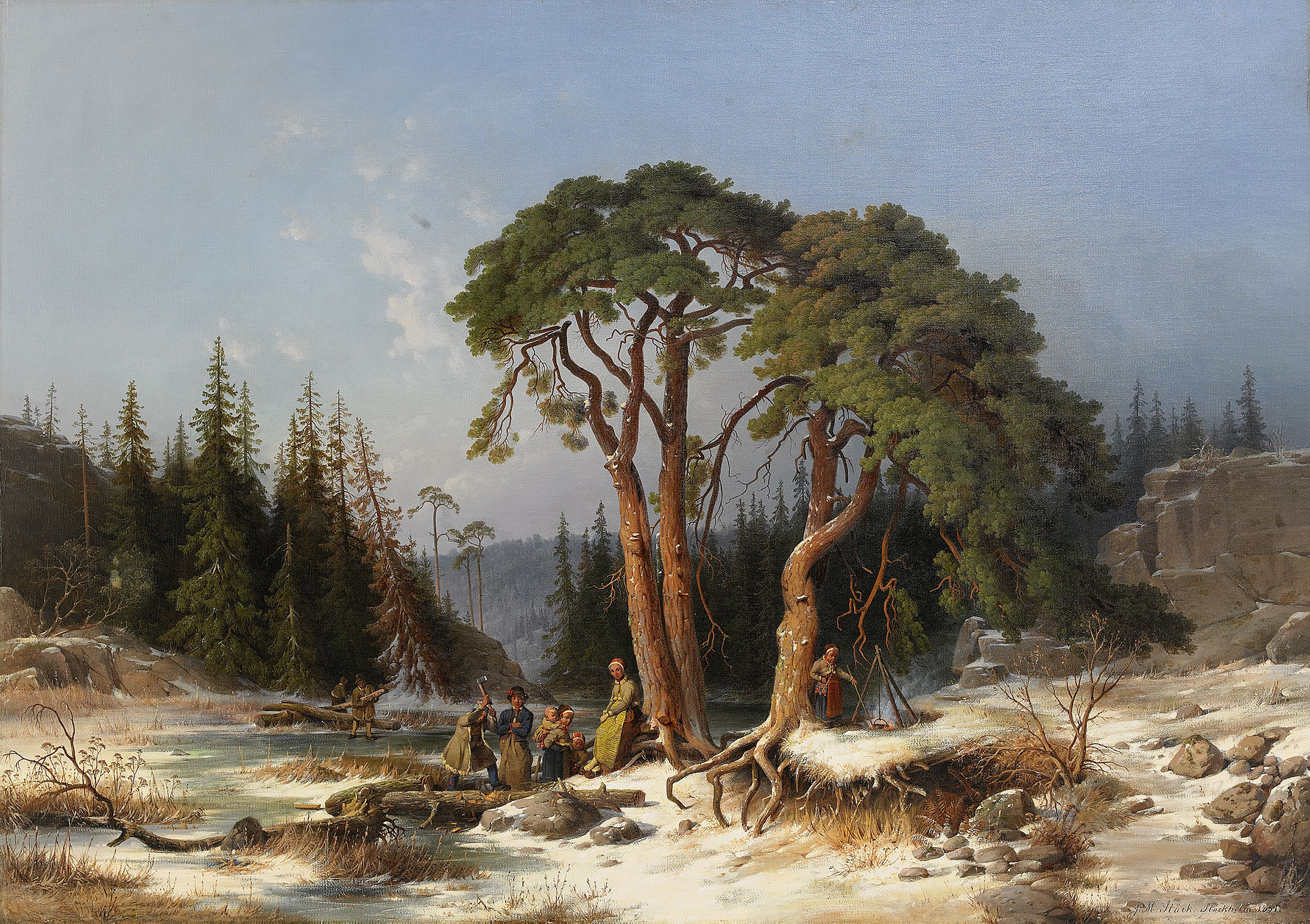
Nordic Winter Scene (1851)

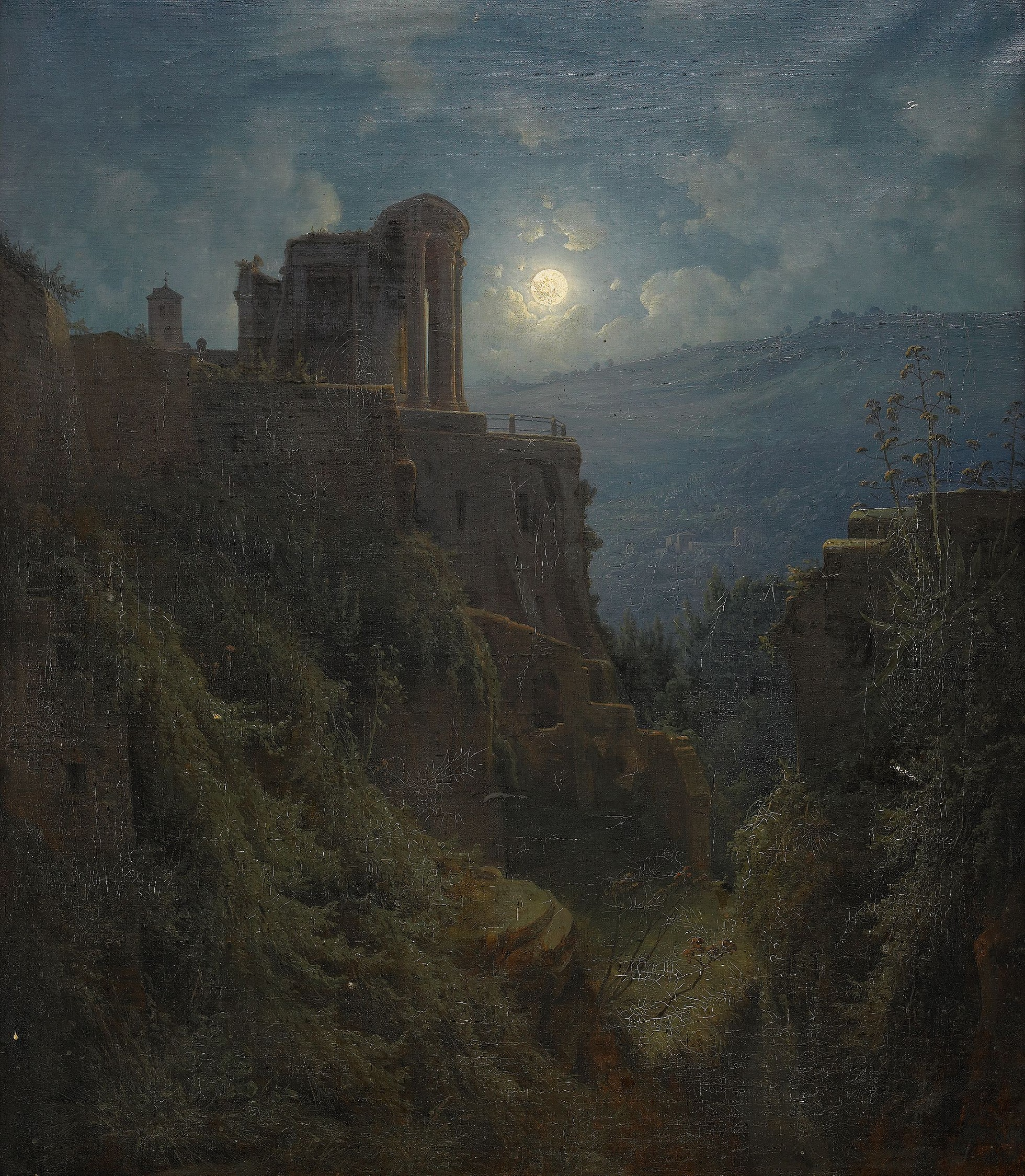
Italian Ruins in the Moonlight (1850)

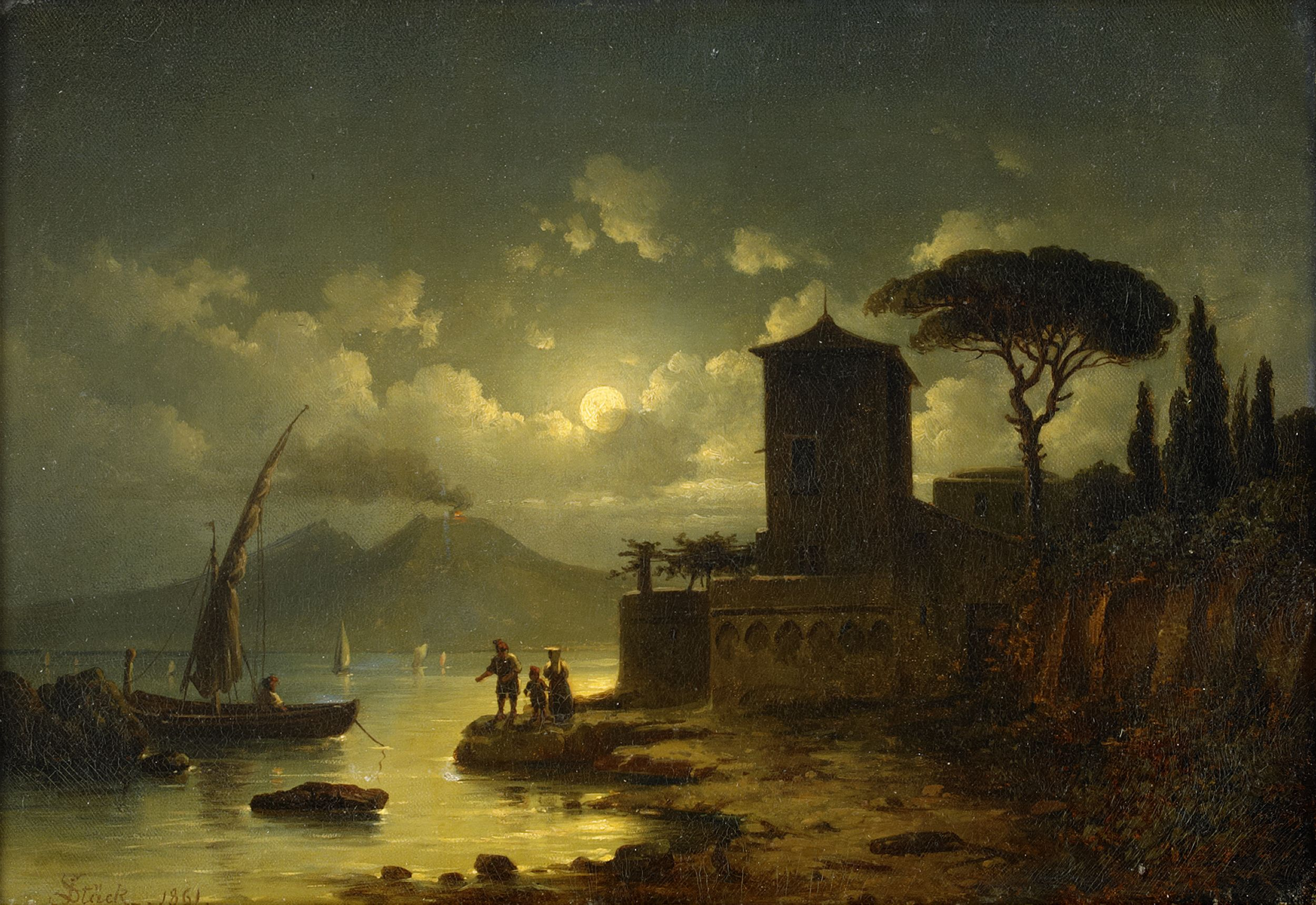
Bay of Naples in the Moonlight (1861)

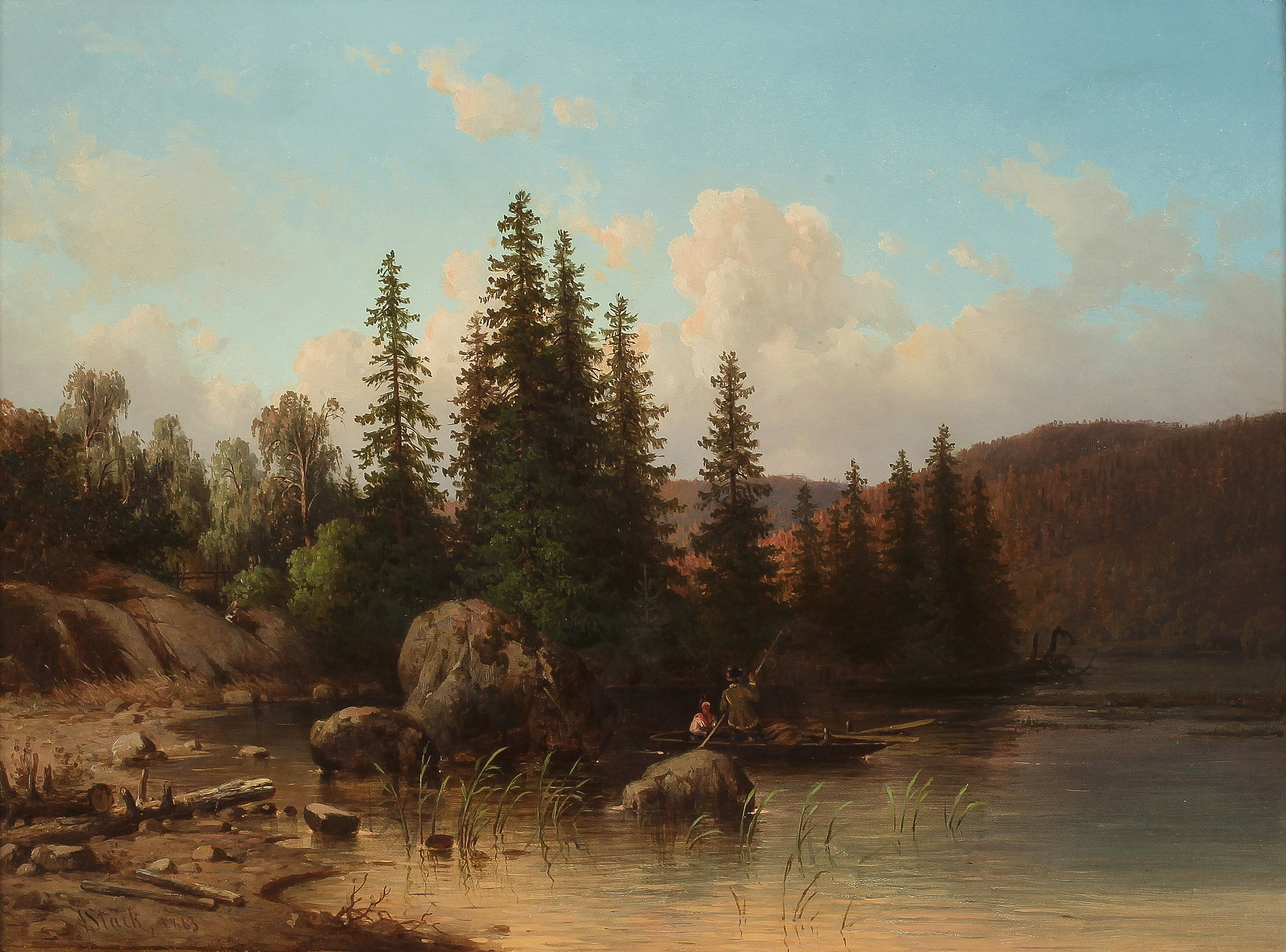
Landscape in Dalarna (1863)

== Other Sources ==
- Georg Nordensvan: Svensk konst och svenska konstnärer i nittonde århundradet, Stockholm : Bonnier, 1928
- Gertrud Serner: Joseph Magnus Stäck - 1812-1868, Malmö : Skånes konstförenings publikation, 1934
