= Carl Gabriel Adelsköld =

Swedish painter

Carl Adelsköld
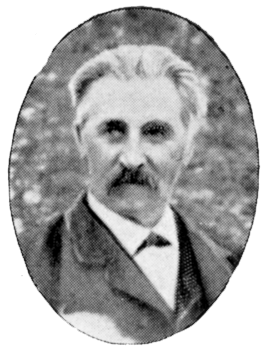
- Born: 6 October 1830; Alingsås, Sweden
- Died: 4 November 1914 (aged 84); Alingsås, Sweden
- Occupation: Painter

Carl Gabriel Adelsköld (6 October 1830 – 4 November 1914) was a Swedish painter.

Carl Gabriel Adelsköld studied at Stockholm and abroad. He was a painter of landscape and navy and painted often coast motives.
