= List of Swedish artists =

This is a list of notable Swedish visual artists.

== A ==
- Emil Åberg (1864–1940), painter, graphics artist, illustrator, animator, and director
- Emma Adbåge (born 1982), illustrator
- Ottilia Adelborg (1855–1936), illustrator
- Ulla Adlerfelt (1736–1765)
- Sofia Adlersparre (1808–1862), painter
- Mattias Adolfsson (born 1965), illustrator
- Gösta Adrian-Nilsson GAN (1884–1965), painter
- Anna Agnér (1896–1977), Swedish painter
- Ivan Aguéli (1869–1917), painter and writer
- Märta Afzelius (1887–1961), textile artist
- Sofia Ahlbom (1823–1868)
- Lea Ahlborn (1829–1891), printmaker
- Björn Ahlgrensson (1872–1918), painter
- Modhir Ahmed (born 1956), painter, printmaker
- Margareta Alströmer (1763–1816), painter
- Nils Elias Anckers (1858–1921), marine artist
- Agneta Andersson (born 1958), sculptor
- Christian Pontus Andersson (born 1977), sculptor
- J. Tobias Anderson (born 1971)
- Karin Mamma Andersson (born 1962), painter
- Lena Anderson (born 1939), illustrator and children's writer
- Oskar Andersson (1877–1906), cartoonist
- Olof Arborelius (1842–1915), painter
- Anders Årfelt (born 1933/34), sculptor
- Tage Åsén (born 1943), painter
- Tore Asplund (1903–1977), painter

== B ==
- Barbro Bäckström (1939–1990), sculptor
- Inge Bagge (1916–1988), sculptor
- Signe Barth (1895–1982), painter, art educator
- John Bauer (1882–1918), painter, illustrator
- Sven-Bertil Bärnarp (1940–2026), cartoonist
- Julia Beck (1853–1935), painter and calligrapher
- Simon Berg (born 1983), artist and photographer
- Richard Bergh (1858–1919), painter
- Jan Berglin (born 1960)
- Elisabeth Bergstrand-Poulsen (1887–1955), painter, illustrator, textile artist
- Tobias Bernstrup (born 1970), performance artist
- Elsa Beskow (1874–1953), painter
- Natanael Beskow (1865–1953)
- Johanna Billing (born 1973)
- Torsten Billman (1909–1989), printmaker, drawer, painter
- Eva Billow (1902–1993), illustrator
- Hugo Birger (1854–1887)
- Oscar Björck (1860–1929), painter
- Frank Björklund (born 1960), surrealist painter and printmaker
- Carl Oscar Borg (1879–1947)
- John Börjeson (1835–1910), sculptor, educator
- Lena Börjeson (1879–1976), sculptor, educator
- Agnes Börjesson (1827–1900)
- Carl Fredrik von Breda (1759–1818)

== C ==
- Pontus Carle (born 1955), contemporary artist
- Otto Gustaf Carlsund (1897–1948), art critic, painter
- Maria Carowsky (1723–1793)
- Kerstin Cardon (1843–1924)
- Charlotta Cedercreutz (1736–1815)
- Siv Cedering (1939–2007), poet, writer, and artist
- Christina Charlotta Cederström (1760–1832), painter, composer, poet
- Gustaf Cederström (1845–1933)
- Moki Cherry (1943–2009), interdisciplinary artist and designer
- Ingvar Cronhammar (1947–2021), sculptor based in Denmark
- Lena Cronqvist (1938–2025), painter, graphic artist and sculptor
- Elisabeth Czapek (1860–1949), miniature painter

== D ==
- Michael Dahl (1659–1743), painter
- Peter Dahl (1934–2019), painter, printmaker
- Elsie Dahlberg-Sundberg (1916–2005), sculptor
- Jonas Dahlberg (born 1970)
- Ibe Dahlquist (1924–1986), silversmith, jeweller
- Nils Dardel (1888–1943), drawer, painter
- Siri Derkert (1888–1973), painter, sculptor
- Nathalie Djurberg (born 1978)
- Brita Drewsen (1887–1983), textile artist active in Denmark
- Fredrika Eleonora von Düben (1738–1808), textile artist

== E ==
- Viking Eggeling (1880–1925), avant-garde artist and filmmaker
- Anna Maria Ehrenstrahl (1666–1729), painter
- Marianne Ehrenström (1773–1867), painter
- Annika Ekdahl (born 1955), textile artist
- Björn Ekegren (born 1955), sculptor
- Märta af Ekenstam (1880–1939), silversmith
- Benny Ekman (born 1955), painter
- Marie-Louise Ekman (born 1944), filmmaker, painter
- Emma Ekwall (1838–1925), painter
- Knut Ekwall (1843–1912), painter, drawer, printmaker
- Carl Eldh (1873–1954), sculptor
- Ester Ellqvist (1880–1918), painter
- Albert Engström (1869–1940), drawer, artist, writer
- Sven Erixson (1899–1970), painter
- Lisa Erlandsdotter (1774–1854)

== F ==
- Öyvind Fahlström (1928–1976), painter, artist
- Dror Feiler (born 1951), artist and musician
- Edith Fischerström (1881–1967), painter, woodcutter and sculptor
- Gustaf Fjæstad (1868–1948), painter
- Maja Fjæstad (1873–1961), painter, textile artist, engraver
- Erik Fleming (1894–1954), silversmith
- Jonny Forsström (1944–2017), painter
- John Erik Franzén (1942–2022), painter
- Ferdinand Frick (1878–1939), sculptor
- Agnes de Frumerie (1869–1937), sculptor, ceramist
- David Frumerie (1641–1677), painter
- Mauritz Frumerie (1775–1853), medal engraver, lithographer

== G ==
- Carl Johan De Geer (born 1938), artist
- Wilhelm von Gegerfelt (1844–1920)
- Esther Gehlin (1892–1949), Danish–Swedish painter
- Felix Gmelin (born 1963)
- Maja Gunn (born 1978), fashion designer
- Maria Johanna Görtz (1783–1853), florist painter
- Brita Granström (born 1969), painter
- Eric Grate (1896–1983), sculptor, drawer, painter, printmaker
- Isaac Hirsche Grünewald (1889–1946), painter
- Ulf Kjell Gür (born 1951), theatre producer and singer-musician

== H ==
- Gillis Hafström (1841–1921), painter and restorer
- Axel Haig (1835–1921), illustrator
- Berta Hansson (1910–1994), painter, sculptor and textile artist
- Per Hasselberg (1850–1894), sculptor
- Carl Michael von Hausswolff (born 1956)
- Hans Hedberg (1917–2007), sculptor
- Snövit Hedstierna (born 1980), visual artist, performance artist and director.
- Gustav Hellberg (born 1967)
- Amalia von Helvig (1776–1831)
- Anna Maria Hilfeling (1713–1783), miniaturist
- Carl Fredrik Hill (1849–1911), painter
- Lars Hillersberg (1937–2004), cartoonist, painter, drawer
- Sigrid Hjertén (1885–1948), painter
- Bror Hjorth (1894–1968), painter and sculptor
- Olle Hjortzberg (1872–1959), drawer, painter, printmaker
- Johan Fredrik Höckert (1826–1866)
- Gerda Höglund (1878–1973), painter
- Ola and Marie Höglund, contemporary glass artists
- Janna Holmstedt (born 1972), installation artist
- Rose-Marie Huuva (born 1943), visual artist, poet

== I ==
- Sven Inge (1935–2008)
- Arne Isacsson (1917–2010), painter
- Karl Isakson (1878–1922), painter
- Helena Sophia Isberg (1819–1875)

== J ==
- Eugène Jansson (1862–1915), painter
- Roine Jansson (born 1952), illustrator
- August Jernberg (1826–1896)
- Einar Jolin (1890–1976), painter
- Erika Jonn (1865–1931), painter
- Arvid Jorm (1892–1964), painter printmaker
- Ernst Josephson (1851–1906), painter
- Daniel Jouseff (born 1975), painter

== K ==
- Gottfrid Kallstenius (1861–1943), painter
- Ewert Karlsson (1918–2004), drawer, cartoonist
- Tyra Kleen (1874–1951), artist, author and women's rights activist
- Alexander Klingspor (born 1977), painter, sculptor
- Hilma af Klint (1862–1944), painter
- Per Krafft the Elder (1724–1793), portraitist
- Per Krafft the Younger (1777–1863), portrait painter
- Wilhelmina Krafft (1778–1828), painter and miniaturist
- Nils Kreuger (1858–1930), painter
- Julius Kronberg (1850–1921), painter
- Hans Krondahl (1929–2018), painter, tapestry weaver, textile artist and textile designer
- Johan Krouthén (1859–1932), painter
- Amalia Wilhelmina Königsmarck (1663–1740), painter

== L ==
- Niclas Lafrensen (1737–1807)
- Lisa Larson (born 1931), ceramicist
- Annika Larsson (born 1972), video
- Carl Larsson (1859–1928), painter
- Bo Christian Larsson (born 1976)
- Jens Olof Lasthein (born 1964), photographer
- Lars Lerin (born 1954), painter, printmaker, illustrator, writer
- Louise Lidströmer (born 1948), artist
- Bruno Liljefors (1860–1939), painter
- David Liljemark (born 1973), artist
- Amalia Lindegren (1814–1891), painter
- Bengt Lindström (1925–2008), painter
- Sven Ljungberg (1913–2010), painter, printmaker, writer
- Torsten Löwgren (1903–1991), painter
- Jonas Lundh (born 1965), painter
- Evert Lundquist (1904–1994), painter, printmaker
- Cecilia Lundqvist (born 1971)

== M ==
- Elias Martin (1739–1818)
- Ulrika Melin (1767–1834)
- Carl Milles (1875–1955), sculptor
- Aleksandra Mir (born 1967)
- Johan Peter Molin (1814–1873), sculptor

== N ==
- Einar Nerman (1888–1983), drawer, illustrator
- Ida Göthilda Nilsson (1840–1920), sculptor
- Lars Nilsson (born 1966)
- Vera Nilsson (1888–1979), painter
- Bengt Nordenberg (1822–1902)
- Anna Nordgren (1847–1916)
- Anna Nordlander (1843–1879)
- Gerhard Nordström (1925–2019) painter, graphic artist
- Jockum Nordström (born 1963), illustrator
- Karl Nordström (1855–1923)
- Max Magnus Norman (born 1973), artist

== O ==
- Elisabeth Ohlson Wallin (born 1961), photographer
- Claes Oldenburg (1929–2022), sculptor
- Bengtolle Oldinger (1911–1988), painter, teacher
- Barbro Östlihn (1930–1995), painter
- Oscar Akermo, tattooist, painter

== P ==
- Gustaf Wilhelm Palm (1810–1890), painter
- Anna Palm de Rosa (1859–1924), painter
- Ulrika Pasch (1735–1796), painter
- Georg Pauli (1855–1935), painter
- Peter Adolf Persson (1862–1914), painter
- Axel Petersson Döderhultarn (1868–1925), sculptor
- Johan Petri (born 1959), theatre director, dramatist, and theatre scholar
- Anna Petrus (1886–1949), sculptor, graphic artist and designer
- Albertus Pictor (c. 1440 – 1509), painter
- Carl Gustaf Pilo (1711–1793), painter
- Vicken von Post-Börjesson (1886–1950), sculptor, painter, ceramicist

== R ==
- Siri Rathsman (1895–1974), surrealist artist
- Oscar Gustave Rejlander (1813–1875), photographer
- Emma Rendel (born 1976), graphic novel artist
- Carl Fredrik Reuterswärd (1934–2016), poet, sculptor
- Oscar Reutersvärd (1915–2002)
- Lennart Rodhe (1916–2005), painter
- Maria Rohl (1801–1875), sketch artist
- Lotten Rönquist (1864–1912), painter
- Georg von Rosen (1843–1923), painter
- Alexander Roslin (1718–1798), painter
- Celina Runeborg (1878–1977), painter

== S ==
- Anna Sahlström (1876–1956), painter and engraver
- Birger Sandzén (1871–1954), painter
- Bertram Schmiterlöw (1920–2002)
- Anna Brita Sergel (1733–1819), textile artist
- Johan Tobias Sergel (1740–1814), sculptor
- Henri Sert (1938–1964), painter
- Josabeth Sjöberg (1812–1882)
- Monica Sjöö (1938–2005), painter, writer
- Carl Eneas Sjöstrand (1828–1906), sculptor
- Maja Sjöström (1868–1961), textile artist
- Sigrid Snoilsky (1813–1856), painter and countess
- Louis Sparre (1863–1964), painter, designer and draughtsman
- Wendela Gustafva Sparre (1772–1855)
- Ulla Stenberg (1792–1858), textile artist
- Gustava Johanna Stenborg (1776–1819)
- August Strindberg (1849–1912), writer, painter
- Per B Sundberg (born 1964), glass and ceramic artist
- Max Walter Svanberg (1912–1994), drawer, printmaker, painter
- Roland Svensson (1910–2003), painter, illustrator, writer

== T ==
- Gustaf Tenggren (1896–1973), painter, animator, illustrator
- Anna Maria Thelott (1683–1710), engraver, illustrator, printmaker, miniaturist painter
- Gerda Tirén (1858–1928), painter and illustrator
- Johan Tirén (1853–1911), painter; husband of the above
- Axel Törneman (1880–1925), painter
- Ida Törnström (1862–1949), painter
- Palle Torsson (born 1970), artist
- Carl Trägårdh (1861–1899), artist

== U ==
- Urban målare (16th century), "Urban the Painter", painter
- Uno Vallman (1913–2004), painter

== V ==
- Lars Vilks (1946–2021), artist

== W ==
- Elsa Danson Wåghals (1885–1977), Swedish visual artist
- Alfred Wahlberg (1834–1906)
- Gerda Wallander (1860–1926), painter
- Bianca Wallin (1909–2006), painter
- David Wallin (1876–1957), painter
- Magnus Wallin (born 1965)
- Sigurd Wallin (1916–1999), painter
- Gösta Wallmark (1928–2017), artist, painter, sculptor
- Wilhelmina Wendt (1896–1988), silversmith
- Peter Weiss (1916–1982), writer, painter, artist
- Anna Wengberg (1885–1936), painter
- Gösta Werner (1909–1989), painter
- Adolf Ulrik Wertmüller (1751–1811), painter
- Alexander Westerlund (born 1985), industrial and furniture designer
- Jan Widströmer (born 1944), painter
- Agnes Wieslander (1873–1934), painter
- Carl Wilhelmson (1866–1928), painter
- Richard Winkler (born 1969), painter, sculptor

== Y ==
- Jwan Yosef (born 1984), painter

== Z ==
- Kristoffer Zetterstrand (born 1973), painter
- Anders Zorn (1860–1920), printmaker, painter

== See also ==
- List of Swedish women artists
- List of Swedish women photographers
- Royal Swedish Academy of Arts
