= Museum Meltdown =

1999 video game

- Developers: Palle Torsson; Tobias Bernstrup
- Directors: Kestutis Kuizinas; Kim Levin; David Elliott
- Engine: Various (including Build)
- Platform: European Museums
- Release: 1999
- Genre: First-person shooter
- Mode: Single-player
- Arcade system: Site-specific art hall

Museum Meltdown is a first-person shooter video game and interactive artwork created by contemporary artists Palle Torsson and Tobias Bernstrup.

== Gameplay ==
Set in a virtual museum the museum visitor could wander around inside a European museum killing and blowing up (art) masterpieces. It represents the virtual meltdown of the museum space as it becomes a backdrop for violence and bad taste.

The first version of the game features Arken Museum of Modern Art (Copenhagen) while the second version features the museum of Contemporary Art Center of Vilnius with the third and final version featuring The Modern Museum of Art (Stockholm).
