= Dahlquist =

Dahlquist, Dahlqvist or Dahlkvist is a surname of Swedish origin. Notable people with the surname include:

== Dahlquist ==
- Cathy Dahlquist (born 1960), American politician
- Ibe Dahlquist (1924–1996), Swedish silversmith
- Jon Dahlquist, founder of Dahlquist High Fidelity Speakers
- Charles W. Dahlquist II (born 1947), president of the Young Men organization of the Church of Jesus Christ of Latter-day Saints
- Chris Dahlquist (born 1962), U.S. ice hockey player
- Lasse Dahlquist (1910–1979), Swedish composer, singer and actor
- Gene Dahlquist (born 1942), American football player and coach
- Germund Dahlquist (1925–2005), Swedish mathematician
- Gordon Dahlquist, U.S. playwright and novelist
- John E. Dahlquist (1896–1975), U.S. Army general and World War II division commander
- Michael Dahlquist (1965–2005), drummer in the Seattle band Silkworm
- Patricia Dahlquist, Canadian singer and actress

== Dahlqvist ==
- Alfred Dahlqvist (1914–1983), Swedish cross country skier
- Isak Dahlqvist (born 2001), Swedish footballer
- Lars Dahlqvist (1935–1969), Swedish Nordic combined skier
- Robert Dahlqvist (1976–2017), guitarist of Thunder Express
- Åke Dahlqvist (1901–1991), Swedish cinematographer

== Dahlkvist ==
- Lisa Dahlkvist (born 1987), Swedish football player
- Sven Dahlkvist (born 1955), Swedish former footballer

== Fictional ==
- John Ezra Dahlquist, the protagonist of the Robert A. Heinlein short story The Long Watch
