= Roine (name) =

Roine is a name which is used as a masculine given name and a surname. People with the name include:

== Given name ==
- Roine Carlsson (1937–2020), Swedish politician
- Roine Karlsson (1943–2013), Swedish race walker
- Roine Jansson (born 1952), Swedish artist and illustrator
- Roine Stolt (born 1956), Swedish guitarist, vocalist and composer

== Surname ==
- Eila Roine (1931–2025), Finnish actress
- Jules Edouard Roiné (1857–1916), French-American sculptor and medallist
- Siri Røine (born 1957), Norwegian civil servant

== See also ==
- Roine (disambiguation)
