= Hafström =

Hafström is a Swedish surname (not to be confused with the Swedish surname Håfström). Notable people with the surname include:

- Gillis Hafström (1841–1909), Swedish painter
- Jonas Hafström (born 1948), Swedish diplomat
