= Christian-Pontus Andersson =

Swedish artist and sculptor

Christian Pontus Andersson (born 1977) is a Swedish artist and sculptor, living in Södermalm, Stockholm.

Christian Pontus Andersson was born in the small town of Brattfors, county of Värmland, in Sweden. First working as a television journalist, Andersson hesitated between studying plastic surgery or becoming an artist. He started studying ceramics at Konstfack, University College of Arts, Crafts and Design, in Stockholm in 2002. During his studies, he opened a ceramic workshop in the Chinese “porcelain capital” of Jingdezhen where he produced his master's degree project, the large-scale baroque series Cry Me the Sorrows (2007). Combining both high artistic and craftsmanship levels, his work gained a lot of attention at the annual Spring exhibition, and led to his first acclaimed solo exhibition at Christian Larsen Gallery (Aerea). Andersson has also exhibited at the National Gallery of Art in Stockholm, and he has participated in group exhibitions in Tokyo, Munich, Frankfurt, and Milan. The National Museum owns his 2007 sculpture Guard for Tears; he is also represented in the collection of the Röhsska Museum with two works.

The work of Christian Pontus Andersson balances between kitsch and stringent form, creating a contrast between the extravagant homoerotic appearances of the figures and the fragile material of which they are made. As sources of inspiration, Andersson mentions Czech artist Alphonse Mucha, and his work also resembles that of Matthew Barney and Jeff Koons.
