= Uno Vallman =

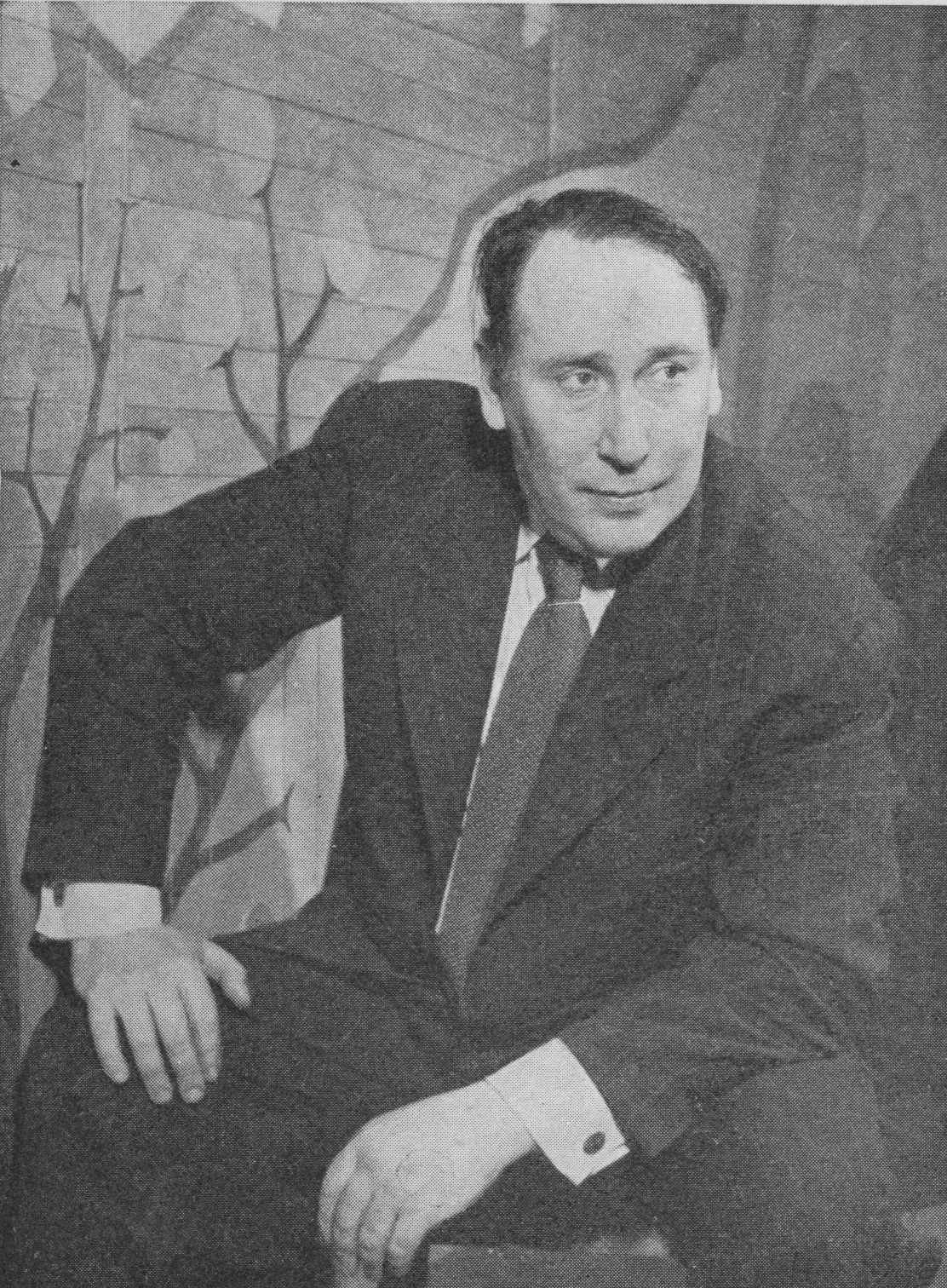
- Uno Vallman circa 1950
- Born: 24 March 1913
- Died: 5 September 2004 (aged 91)

Uno Vallman (Norrala, 24 March 1913 – Stockholm, 5 September 2004) was a Swedish painter.

Vallman studied at the Royal Institute of Art in Stockholm and developed a colourful naivist style of painting under the influence of Isaac Grünewald and Sven Erixson. His breakthrough came with the Ung konst ("Young art") exhibition in Stockholm in 1947. He later learned to know the Danish artist Asger Jorn, whose influence made Vallman develop a more abstract style. Uno Vallman was one of the original members of the avantgarde movement called COBRA which included artists like Karel Appel and Corneille. He was introduced to this group of artists by one of his friends and co-founder of the CoBra Art movement Asger Jorn from Denmark (1914–1973). Uno Vallman travelled a lot for studies to for example Italy, Spain, North Africa, China, Rumania, Mexico, Russia and the USA. Uno Vallman lived in Paris for several years from 1940 to 1960. During these years he got acquainted with none other than Marc Chagall. Marc Chagall on his behalf was in contact with the artist Miro. He learned a lot of them. Chagall and Vallman had an exhibition in 1952 in the USA Vallman became known as one of the 'Men of 1947' and was one of a group of artists responsible for moving art forwards into a modern age in Scandinavia. The 'Men of 1947' was a group of artists who had an exhibition together during 1947 During the 1960s Vallman was described as the "Picasso of the North" by French art critics. Uno Valmann's art was not only art but was considered a way of living called 'Valmanismen'. In 1968 Uno Vallman was invited to represent Scandinavia together with August Strindberg and Edvard Munch for a modern art exhibition in Mexico City as part of the Olympics.

Uno Vallman's works are included in the Swedish National Museum, The Swedish Modern Museum and some other museums. His works are also included in the collections of Lyndon Johnson, Jimmy Carter and the Tessin Institute in Paris.

He also wrote a book called 'Som lamans utsende I Tibet' (1980) and illustrated a book called 'Kanaljen is seraljen' by the author Lennart Hellsings.

During the 1980s he was mentioned in the media for owning a statue by Paul Gauguin which he sold at auction (Christies New York). After he died his dotter found out the money of the sale had been deposited at a bank account in Luxembourg at Banque Invik. She could see that although the money had been deposited and was never withdrawn, the money appeared to have disappeared. She wrote to the bank without an answer and even threatened the banque with a lawyer called Lennart Lindstrom from the Law firm Grunberger. Uno Vallman had apparently opened the bank account together with another man and signed what is called a "Hold Mail" agreement. A Hold Mail agreement means that the bank is not allowed to send information about communication, available assets and/or transactions. The claim she made was around 8 million Swedish Crowns (around 800.000,00 US dollars) which was around the amount the statue sold for, while all possessions on paper showed a value of 10.000,00 Swedish Crowns (around 1.000,00 US dollars).

Uno Vallman also played an interesting role in a story about a painting that he bought at a gallery which was later authenticated to be by the painter Emile Henry Bernard (a friend of Van Gogh, Cézanne and Gaugain.
