= Roine =

Roine may refer to:

- Rhone (Roine in Aragonese and Catalan), a river in Switzerland and France
- Roine (Finland), a lake in Finland
- Roine (name)
