= Inga Bagge =

Swedish sculptor and painter

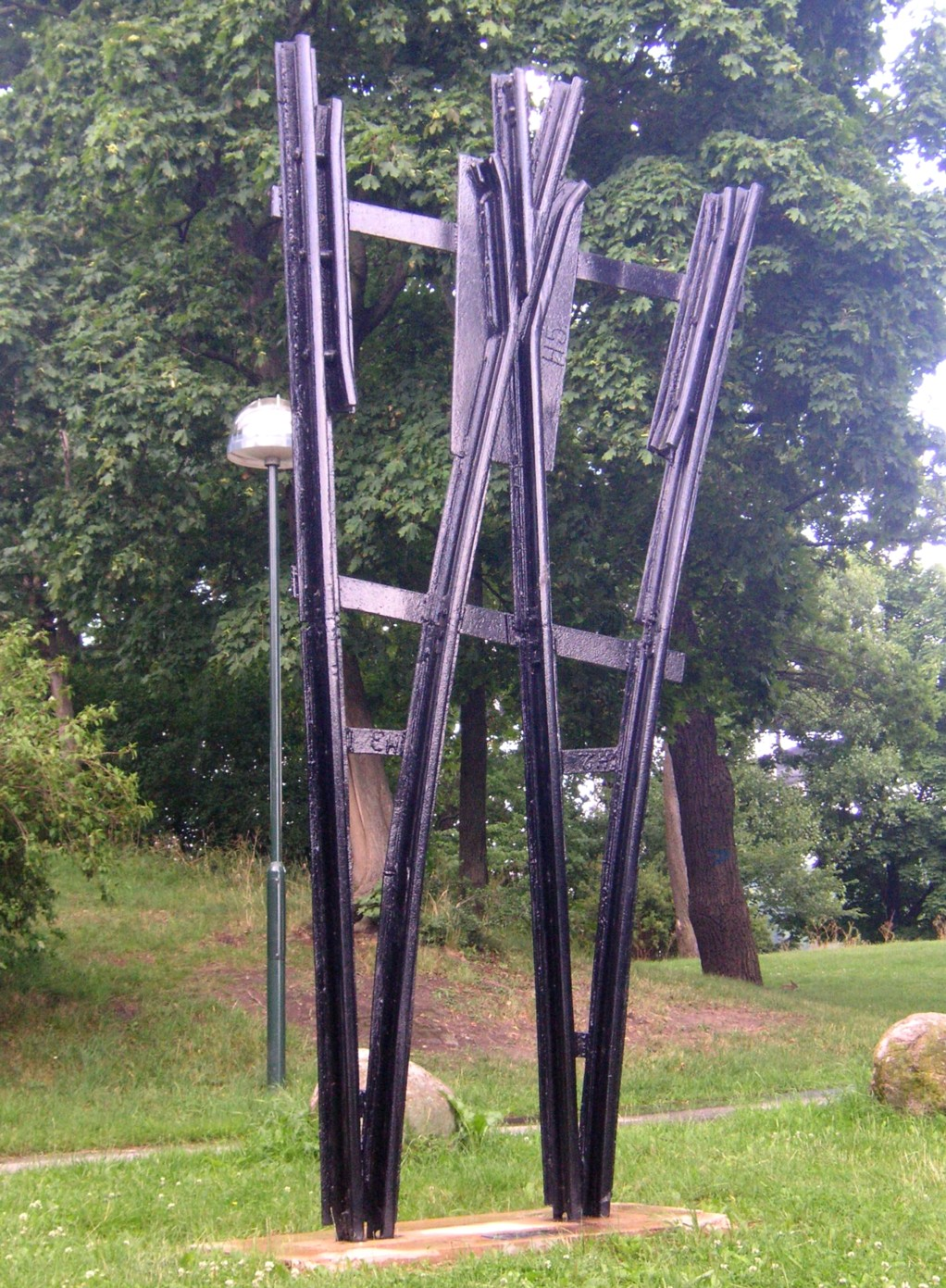
Inga Bagge's Smalspårig Växel, Stockholm (completed 1889)

Inga Bagge (24 July 1916 – 3 May 1988) was a Swedish sculptor and painter. Her art education started in the mid-1930s under Leoo Verde at the ABF school in Linköping and in the early 1950s included the Royal Swedish Academy of Fine Arts. Consisting of a variety of unconventional materials, her early works attracted attention and acclaim at her 1958 début exhibition at the Burén Gallery in Stockholm. She went on to create even more surprising works, many of which can be seen in public places as well as in a number of museums. One of her most significant, the huge two-dimensional Livsträdet (Tree of Life, 1975), can be seen in Stockholm's Moderna Museet. Bagge also taught at Konstskolan Idun Lovén.

== Biography ==
Born on 24 July 1916 in Stockholm, Inga Bagge was the daughter of the engineer Jakob Gustaf Pontus Bagge (1863–1954) and his wife Tora Augusta née Lindberg (1885–1921). She was the second of the family's two children. After her mother died prematurely, she and her siblings were brought up by their father. The family moved to Linköping in 1926 where, after attending a girls' school, in 1938 Inga Begga studied art under Leoo Verde at the ABF school. She also studied at Otte Sköld's art school. Around 1940, she married Rev John Henderson Powell with whom she had a daughter Ingela.

From 1951 to 1957, she studied at the Royal Art Academy under the painter and sculptor Bror Hjorth and the painter Sven Erixson. From Hjorth, she acquired the concept of "constructing" sculptures. Both teachers appreciated Bagge's "nervy and sensitive way of working". In 1968, she created a textile work titled Hommage à Bror Hjorth.

While still at the Academy, Bagge began to experiment with unusual materials, for example combining wet rags with plaster. In 1958, her solo exhibition at the Burén Gallery deeply impressed the art critic Ulf Linde who commented: "...her Marcel Ayme-like entourage of burlesque bodies also has fine sculptural qualities. Their expressiveness comes not only from the wild arrangements but from an inner core of simple cohesion of form".

After encountering Marcel Duchamp's art at an exhibition in 1963, Bagge came to realize that she could create works with whatever she liked. Her Såsom jag flyger, titta en spegel combined a workman's stool with chicken wire, gloves, silk stockings, bicycle locks, plastic flowers and footwear. Most of her significant works belong to this period. Bagge herself considers the almost two-dimensional Livsträdet (Tree of Life) her most significant work. It consists of various textiles, buttons, beads, sequins, tape and a small clutch bag.

Inga Bagge died in Järna on 3 May 1988.
