= Daniel Jouseff =

Swedish artist

Daniel Youssef
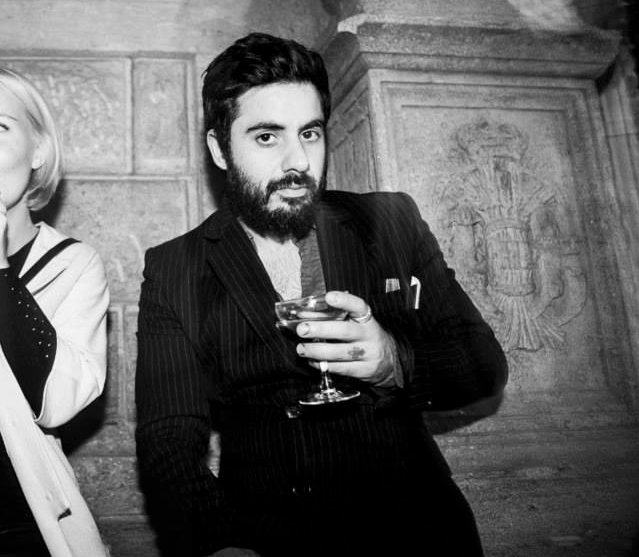
- Daniel Youssef in Stockholm, Sweden
- Born: 1975 (age 49–50); Växjö, Sweden
- Occupation: Swedish artist

Daniel Youssef (born 1975) is a Swedish-Palestinian artist based in Stockholm. He works with questions concerning identity and language in drawings, neon works and installations.

== Background ==
Daniel Youssef, born 1975 in Växjö, lives and works in Stockholm, Sweden. He has exhibited at Södertälje konsthall, Skövde konsthall, and Arsenalsgatan 3 in Stockholm, among others. He is represented at Skövde konsthall and Ståhl Collection, Norrköping, and is the former recipient of a working grant from The Mirror Institution, Sweden.

The artistry of Daniel Youssef deals with the challenges of being in between two languages, two cultures and to a certain extent, in between two different views of the world. With the one foot he stands in his parents’ respective cultures, and with the other he stands firmly in Sweden, the land in which he was born. Youssef’s parents immigrated to Sweden in the 1970’s and the spoken language around him at home was Arabic. However, in the outside world, Swedish dominated. Youssef never became completely fluent in Arabic, neither did his Swedish sound exactly as that of his friends with Swedish-born parents. This resulted in a breach in terms of identity as well as in the experience of history and the understanding of a shared present. From within this breach, Youssef has found his creative language which has taken physical form in installations, drawings, neon works and film. He describes himself as “An Arab whose western culture, ironically enough, is a confirmation of his Arabic origin”. Youssef may very well find his inspiration in his private and personal experiences of life, but he succeeds ingeniously in transforming these experiences into a common understanding of identification and he, thus, offers a platform for a discussion about human possibilities and challenges in a border-crossing world.

== Exhibitions ==
- Översättningar, Södertälje Konsthall, Sweden, 2021 (solo)
- Daniel Jouseff, Skövde Konsthall, Sweden, 2021 (solo)
- Kommunikation, Arsenalsgatan 3, Stockholm, Sweden, 2021 (solo)
- From Inferno, Anna Bohman Gallery, Stockholm, 2023 (solo)
- Swedish Ecstasy, Bozar, Brussels, Belgium, 2023 (group)

== Publications ==
- Book of Daniel, 2021
- New Borders, 2021
