= Simon Berg =

Swedish artist and photographer (born 1983)

Simon Mlangeni-Berg
- Born: 1983 (age 42–43); Boden, Sweden
- Education: School of Photography
- Occupations: Artist; photographer

Simon Mlangeni-Berg (FKA Simon Berg), born 1983 in Boden, Sweden, is a Swedish artist and photographer.

He studied at the School of Photography in Gothenburg where he earned a master's degree in 2012.

His photographs have been shown at major Swedish cultural institutions as Kulturens hus and Göteborgs Konsthall. He is also represented with several works in the Hasselblad Foundation collection.

In 2010 Simon Mlangeni-Berg was appointed to "Hot Shot", i.e. rising star, in the November issue of the international art magazine Modern Painters.

== Solo exhibitions ==
- A journal of selected bibliography, The Swedish house, Kavala, Greece [ 2014 ]
- The resistance of matter, Galleri Format (Rummet), Malmö, Sweden [ 2014 ]
- The resistance of matter, Galleri Mors Mössa, Gothenburg, Sweden [ 2014 ]
- (III), Gallery Galaxen, Sandvikens Konsthall, Sandviken, Sweden [ 2013 ]
- (III), Galleri Monitor, Gothenburg, Sweden [2012 ]
