= Gustav Hellberg =

Swedish artist (born 1967)

Gustav Hellberg (born 1967), is a Swedish visual artist who lives and works in Berlin.

== Life and career ==
Hellberg was born in 1967 in Stockholm, Sweden. He has created works in Sweden, Germany, Norway and Spain. Hellberg graduated 1998 from the Royal Institute of Art in Stockholm with a MFA. He has also studied Aesthetics at Stockholm University. In 2000 he moved to Berlin, where he now lives and works.

Hellberg creates public art, seeking for an interaction between people, artwork and the public space. The intervention he’s seeking is a play upon the memories of an actual place.

To realise a work, he chooses a site depending on its qualities, in order to put out a visual and poetic argument that will attempt to draw people’s attention to the urban backdrop of everyday life. The basic function of the work that is placed out in a public space is to change a detail in our everyday life and thereby trigger thoughts in different routes.

Parallel to these activities Hellberg is also exhibiting installations, sculpture and objects in museums and galleries. He has also been a challenging debater on topics surrounding events of art production in the public sphere as well as urban planning in general. Hellberg has lectures at the art colleges Valand Academy and Umeå Academy of Fine Arts. Currently Hellberg is a professor at Chung-Ang University, Republic of South Korea.

== Key artworks ==
- Blinka Malmö stadsbibliotek, Malmö 2002
- Pulsing Path, Madrid 2006
- Solution, Göteborg 2010
- Obstruction, Malmö 2010
- Alien, 2014
- XYZ, 2015, commissioned by the National Swedish Arts Council

== Important exhibitions ==
- Flaneur, Raid Projects, Los Angeles 2007
- Arnstedt & Kullgren, Båstad 2008
- Anderson Sandström, Stockholm 2008
- Dunkers Kulturhus 2009
- Malmö Art Museum 2009
- Hamish Morrison Galerie, Berlin 2010
- EMAF, Osnabrück 2012
- Unsere Kunst - Eure Kunst, Stadtgalerie Kiel 2013
- ThingWorld: International Triennial of New Media Art, National Art Museum of China 2014
- Dresden Public Art View 2014
- Kunst Kraft Werk, Leipzig 2015
- Kunst und Kultur am Rosa-Luxemburg-Platz, Berlin 2015
