= Märta Afzelius =

Swedish artist (1887–1961)

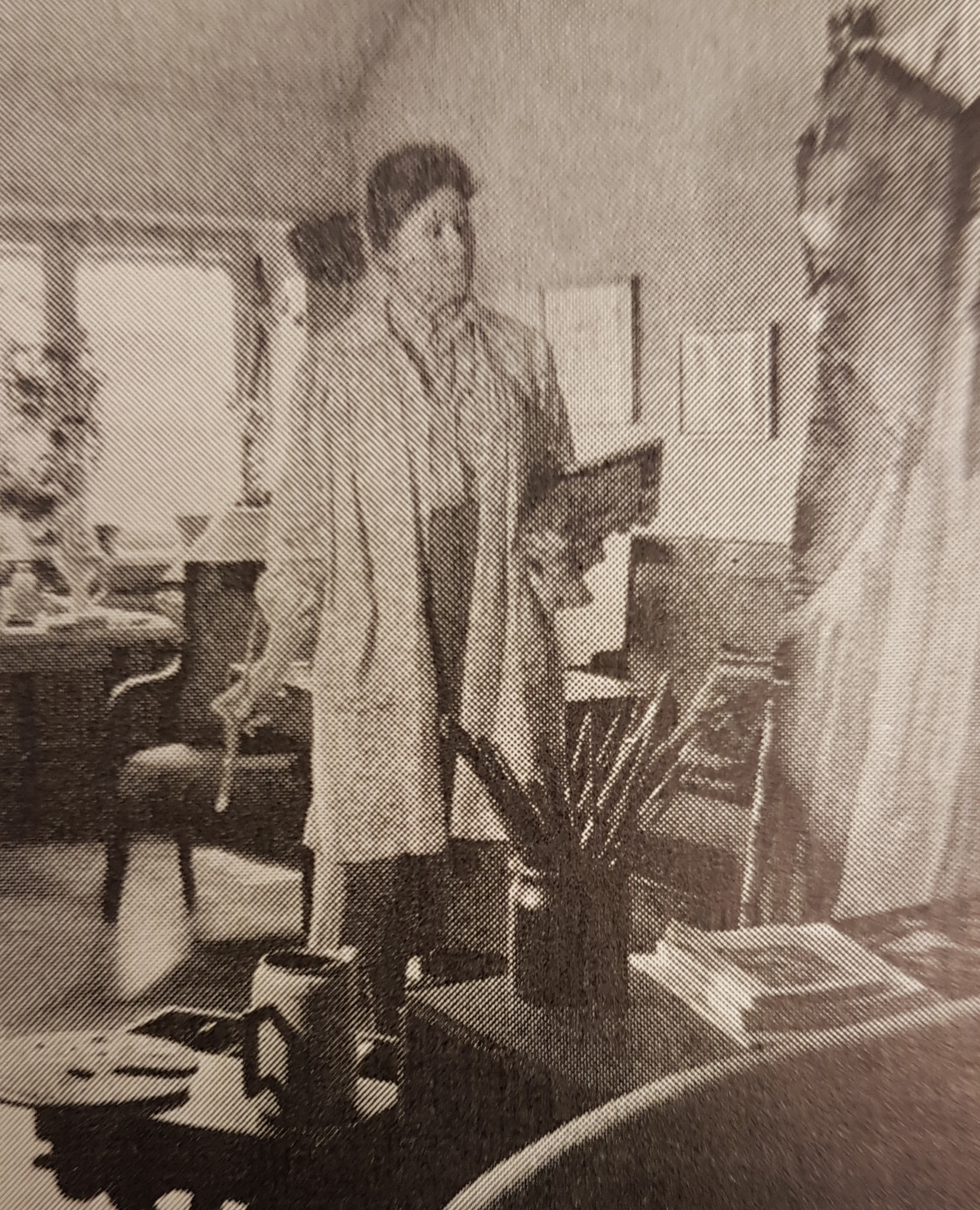
Märta Afzelius

Märta Afzelius (1887–1961) was a Swedish textile artist who also worked as a painter and illustrator. She is remembered in particular for textiles based on religious subjects. From 1928, Afzelius produced works for commercial firms including Elsa Gullberg Textil och Inredningar and Licium. Her creations include the largest rug from Sweden, designed for the liner MS Kungsholm in 1928. She also designed bishops' chasubles, embroidered patterns for furniture, and new designs for Vastena lace. Her most celebrated work is the woven triptych she created for Linköping Cathedral in 1935.

== Early life ==
Born in Stockholm on 14 May 1887, Märta Afzelius was the daughter of the lawyer and politician Johan Fredrik Ivar Afzelius and his wife Anna Sofia Gabriella née Richert.

She attended the Royal Swedish Academy of Fine Arts (1911–1914) and made several study trips to Italy and Iceland.

== Career ==
Afelius working together with the textile designer Elsa Gullberg for a number a years, in 1928 she joined her textile and interior decorating firm Elsa Gullberg Textil och Inredningar in Stockholm. Her first assignment was to create several rugs for the 1928 Swedish liner MS Kungsholm. One of them, designed in Chinese style, attracted attention as the largest pile rug to be woven in Sweden. In 1932, she created patterns for tablecloths including "Svensk Flora" and "Gårdarna" which were machine-woven by Almedahl-Dalsjöfors.

Many of her works depicted religious subjects, such as an altarpiece of the crucifix woven with the röllakan technique which was exhibited at the 1930 Stockholm Exhibition. Its creatively stylized human forms made such an impression on the Norwegian painter Henrik Sørensen that in 1935 he commissioned her to create a triptych for the choir ambulatory in Linköping Cathedral behind his own paintings. Titled "Skapelsen" (the Creation), with its vividly coloured stylized foliage and animals, it is Afzelius's largest woven work and her most celebrated creation. From 1941 to 1952, Afzelius worked for Licium, where she contributed designs for religious works, such as bishops' chasubles. She designed one for the newly established diocese of Stockholm in 1942 but also for other dioceses. Her religious works included antependia and wall hangings, some commissioned by Skara Cathedral in 1949 and St Olai's Church in Norrköping in 1950.

Märta Afzelius died on 30 June 1961 in Stockholm.

== Awards ==
In 1941, Afzelius was honoured with the Litteris et Artibus medal for her contributions to Swedish culture.
