= Benny Ekman =

Swedish artist (born 1955)

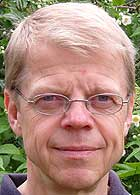
- Born: 1955 (age 70–71); Stockholm, Sweden
- Known for: Acrylics
- Awards: Västerviks kommun kulturstipendium 2008, Kulturstipendium regionförbundet Kalmar 2005
- Website: www.bennyekman.se

Benny Ekman (born 1955 in Stockholm, Sweden) is a Swedish artist. He emigrated to Australia with his family in 1958. The family returned to Huddinge in 1969. In 1991 he moved to Västervik on the south-east coast of Sweden. Ekman paints mainly in acrylics but also uses other techniques in his art. His first exhibition was on the Summer Salon in Västervik in 1996, and since then he has had several separate exhibitions and exhibitions with others. Ekman has shown his work at Liljevalch's, Cow Parade in Stockholm with two cows and also created five art suites at the Icehotel in Jukkasjärvi in Sweden. He is represented in Landstinget i Kalmar län, Västerviks Kommun, Psykiatriska Museet Västervik Sweden, Townhall Närpes Finland, Modern Art Museum Latvia and has received the Kalmar culture award 2005 and the Västervik culture award 2008.

== Gallery ==
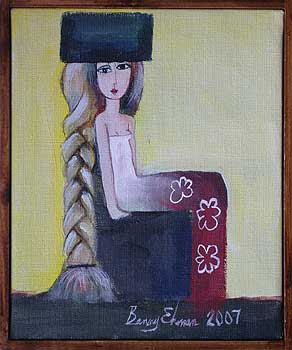
The girl with the pigtail, acrylic 22×27 cm

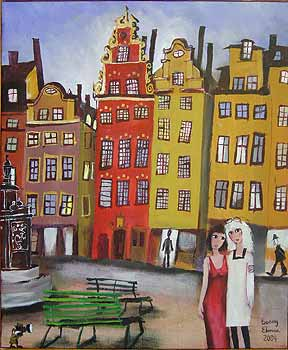
The photografer, acrylic 65×81 cm

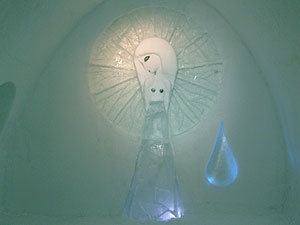
Virgin Angel, art suite at Icehotel, Jukkasjärvi 2007

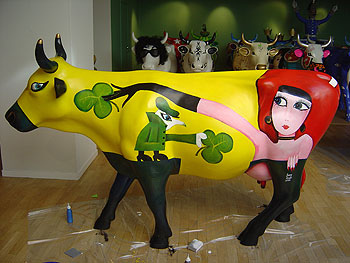
Bribe with clover, Cow Parade, Stockholm 2004
