= Anders Årfelt =

Swedish sculptor (born 1934)

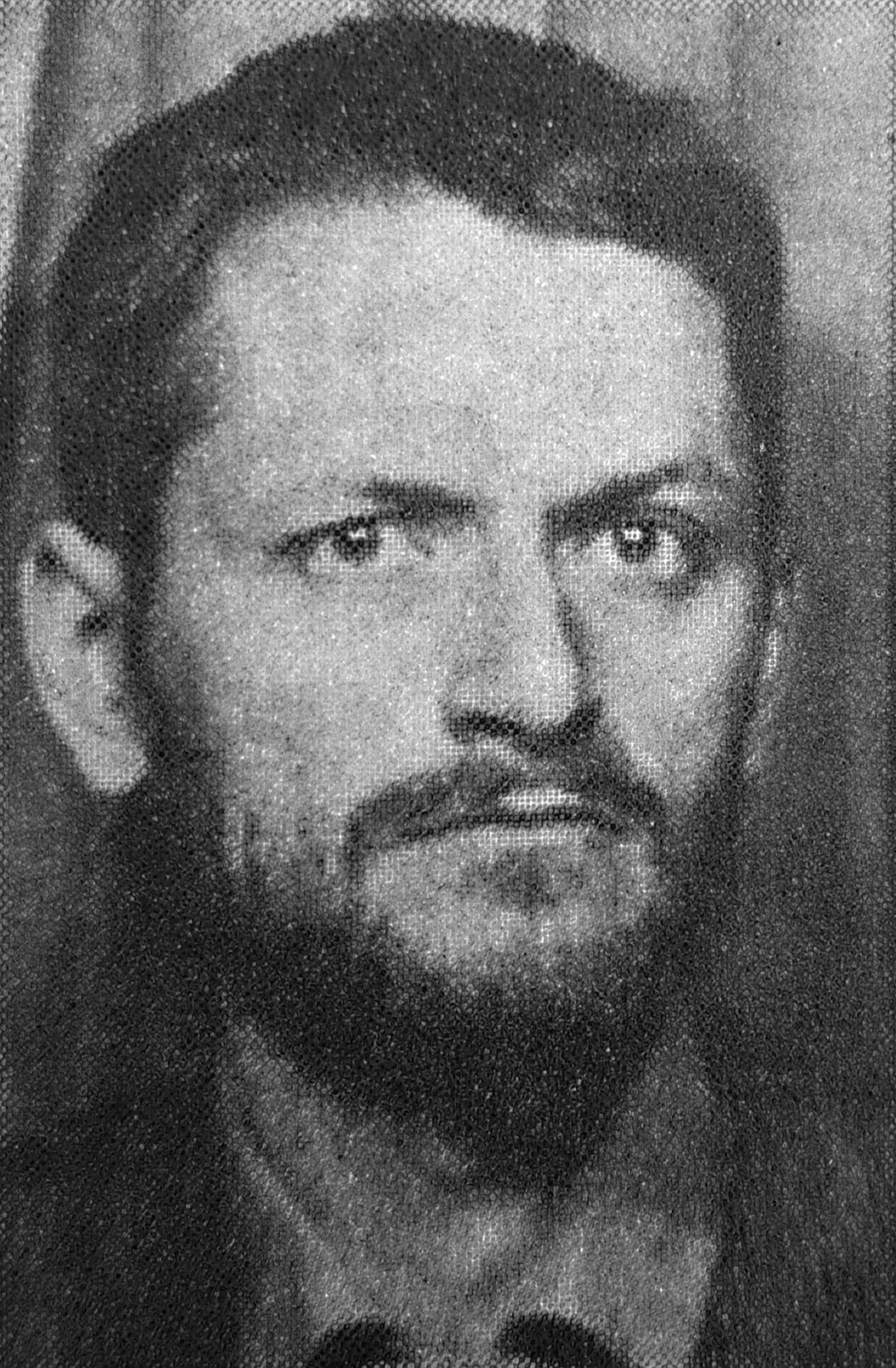
Årfelt, before 1968

Per Anders Årfelt (born 8 March 1934) is a Swedish sculptor.

He is based on Gotland, Sweden's largest island, and often works in concrete. He produced a concrete sculpture of a ram, which appears on the coat of arms of Gotland, for Österport in Visby in 1992. This was a development of an earlier lamb sculpture he made for the Melonen district of the town. The ram proved popular and he was commissioned to create copies for other municipalities on the island.

Årfelt was commissioned to sculpt lions in the style of the rams for Stockholm; lions feature as supporters on the coat of arms of Sweden. A total of 38 lions in male and female forms were placed in the street of Drottninggatan. The lions weighed 900 kilograms (2,000 lb) each.

The truck driven by the terrorist in the 7 April 2017 vehicle ramming attack on Drottninggatan struck several of the lion sculptures and came to a halt next to one that it overturned. The lions potentially slowed the truck and saved lives, though five people were killed in the attack. The overturned lion became the site of tributes to the dead and there were calls for it to be recreated in bronze. After the attack Årfelt said that the lions symbolise power and strength.

In the aftermath of the attack the city of Stockholm commissioned further lion sculptures from Årfelt to help protect the city. These were larger, measuring 1 metre (3 ft 3 in) in height and 3 tonnes (3.0 long tons; 3.3 short tons) in weight, than the originals and so more likely to stop larger vehicles. Two were originally ordered as prototypes but by March 2019 four were installed on Drottninggatan and a further 16 were in production. The new lion sculptures were manufactured at a Skanska factory on Gotland.

In February 2017 a series of 20 Säfstaholm apple sculptures commissioned from Årfelt were installed in Sweden.

== Images of sculptures ==
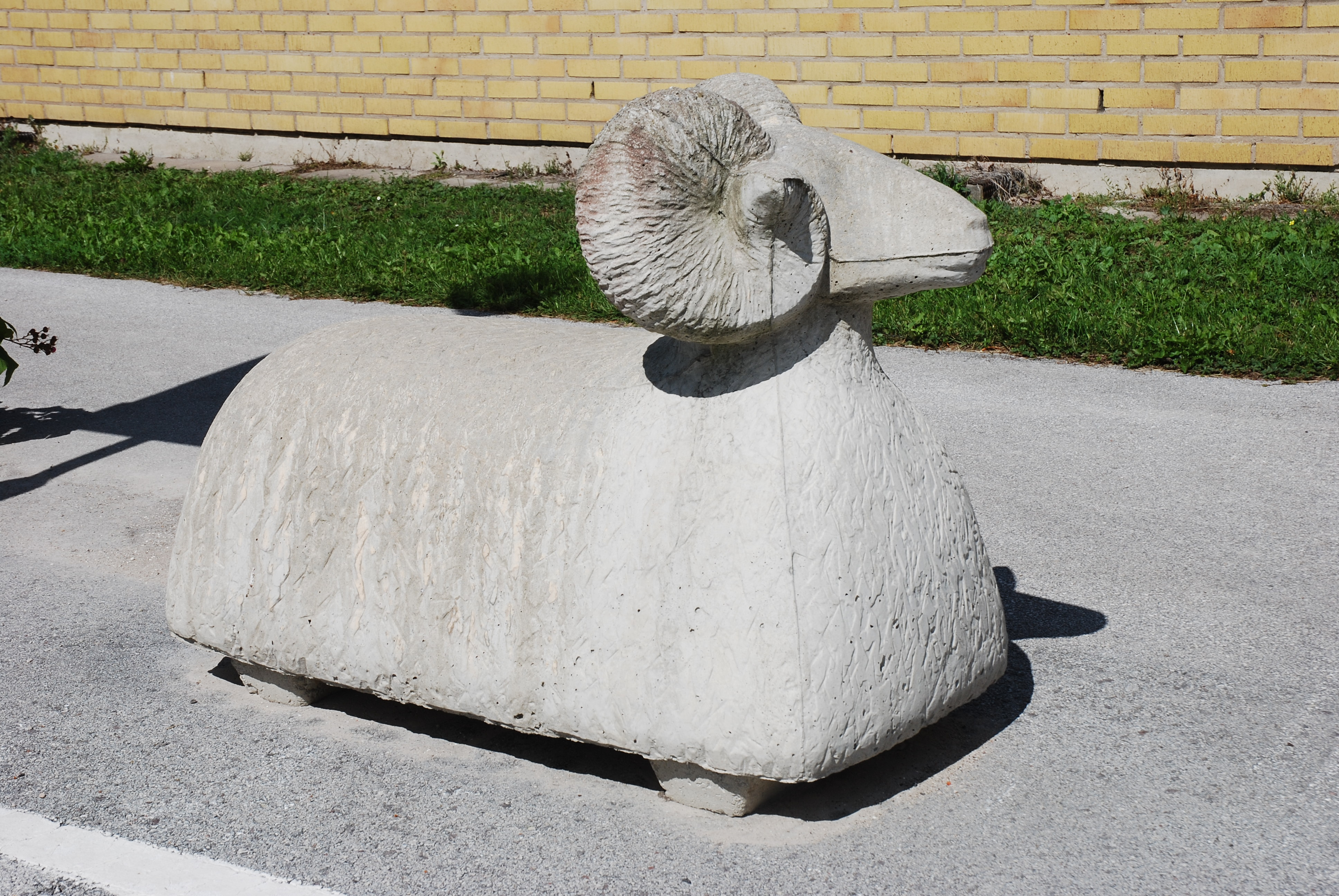
Ram sculpture

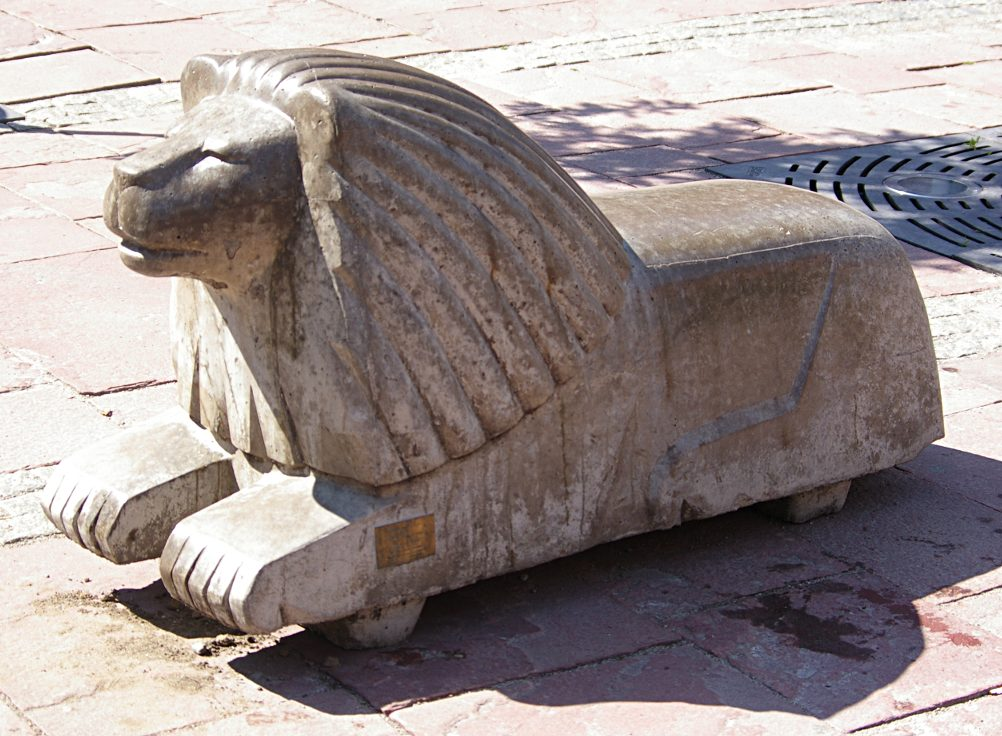
One of the original lion sculptures

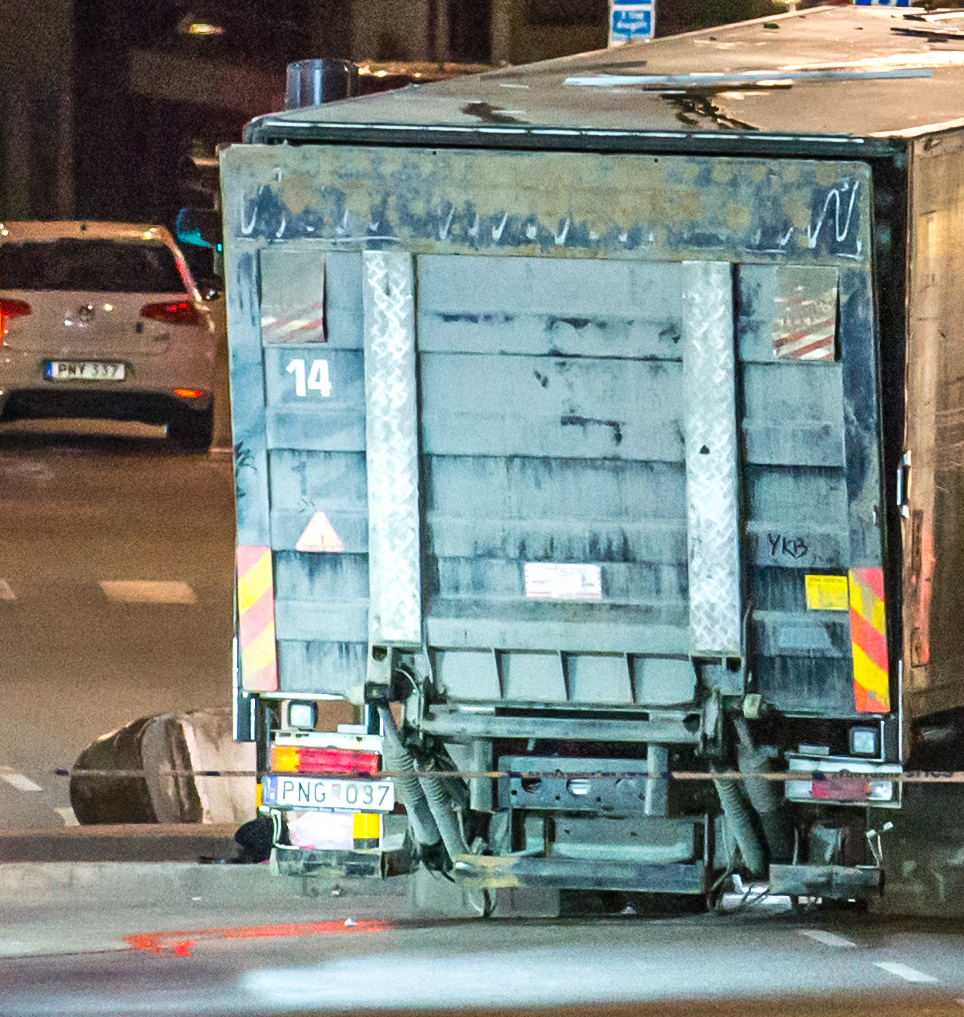
An upturned lion adjacent to the truck used in the 2017 attack

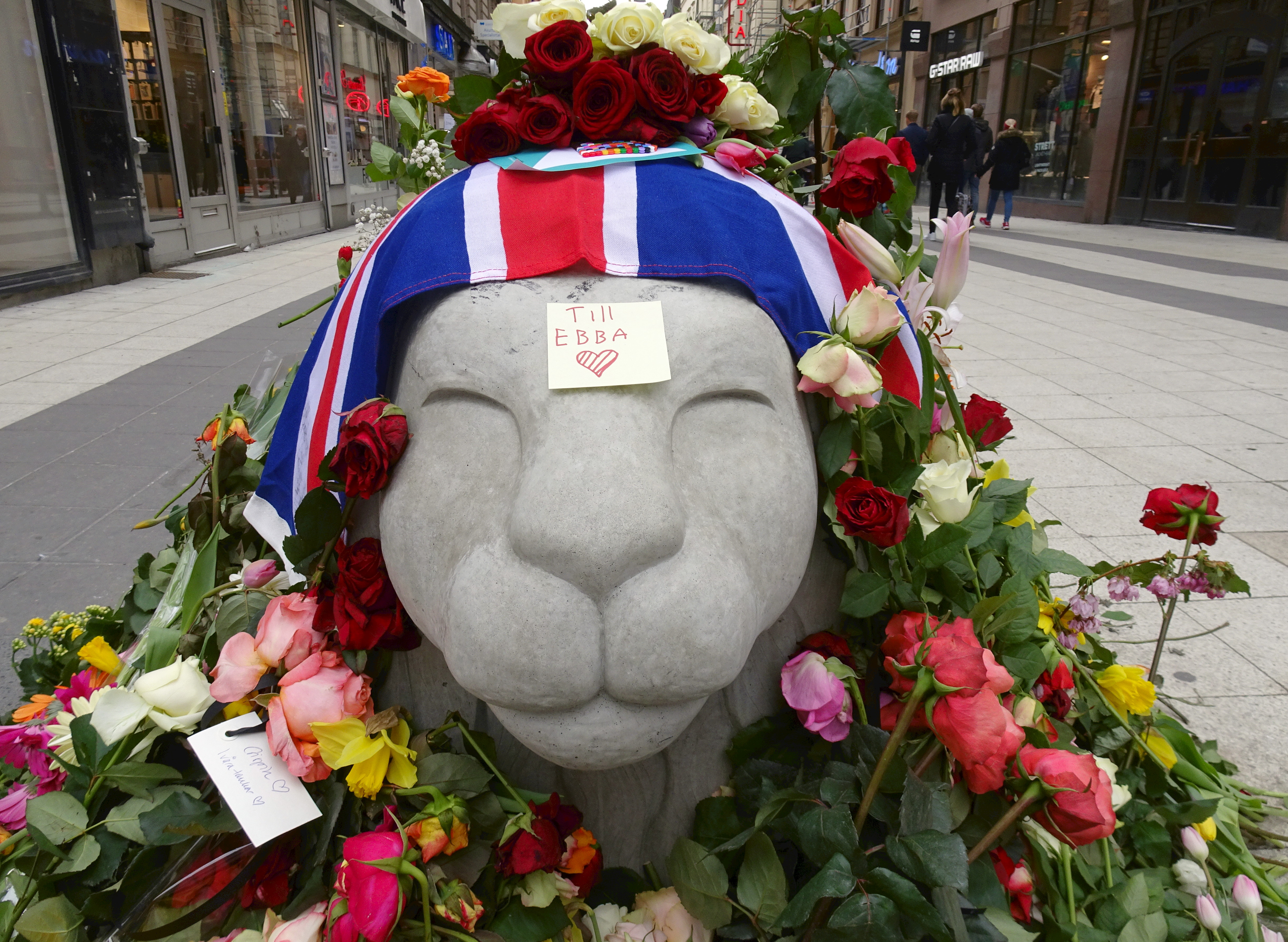
Tributes placed on one of the lions the week after the attack
