= Oscar Akermo =

Swedish-born tattoo artist and painter

Oscar Åkermo
- Born: Uddevalla, Sweden
- Style: Tattooist; Painter
- Website: oscarakermo.com

Oscar Åkermo is a Swedish tattoo artist based in New York City. He is best known for tattooing notable people such as TJ Dillashaw, Alexander DeLeon, Marco Scandella, Sebastian Ingrosso and Miriam Bryant, and for pioneering the modern black and gray tattooing style.

== Background ==
Åkermo was born and grew up in Uddevalla, Sweden. His brother is Swedish television and film actor, Martin Wallström. Initially, he wanted to become a musician, and studied art and music at Sinclair High School.

Åkermo began tattooing at 13 using homemade machines constructed with a nine-volt motor. At 17, Akermo quit high school to work as an apprentice in a tattoo shop. Eventually, he moved to New York City to work for Bang Bang tattoo studio.
