= Sven Inge =

Swedish painter and modern artist (1935–2008)

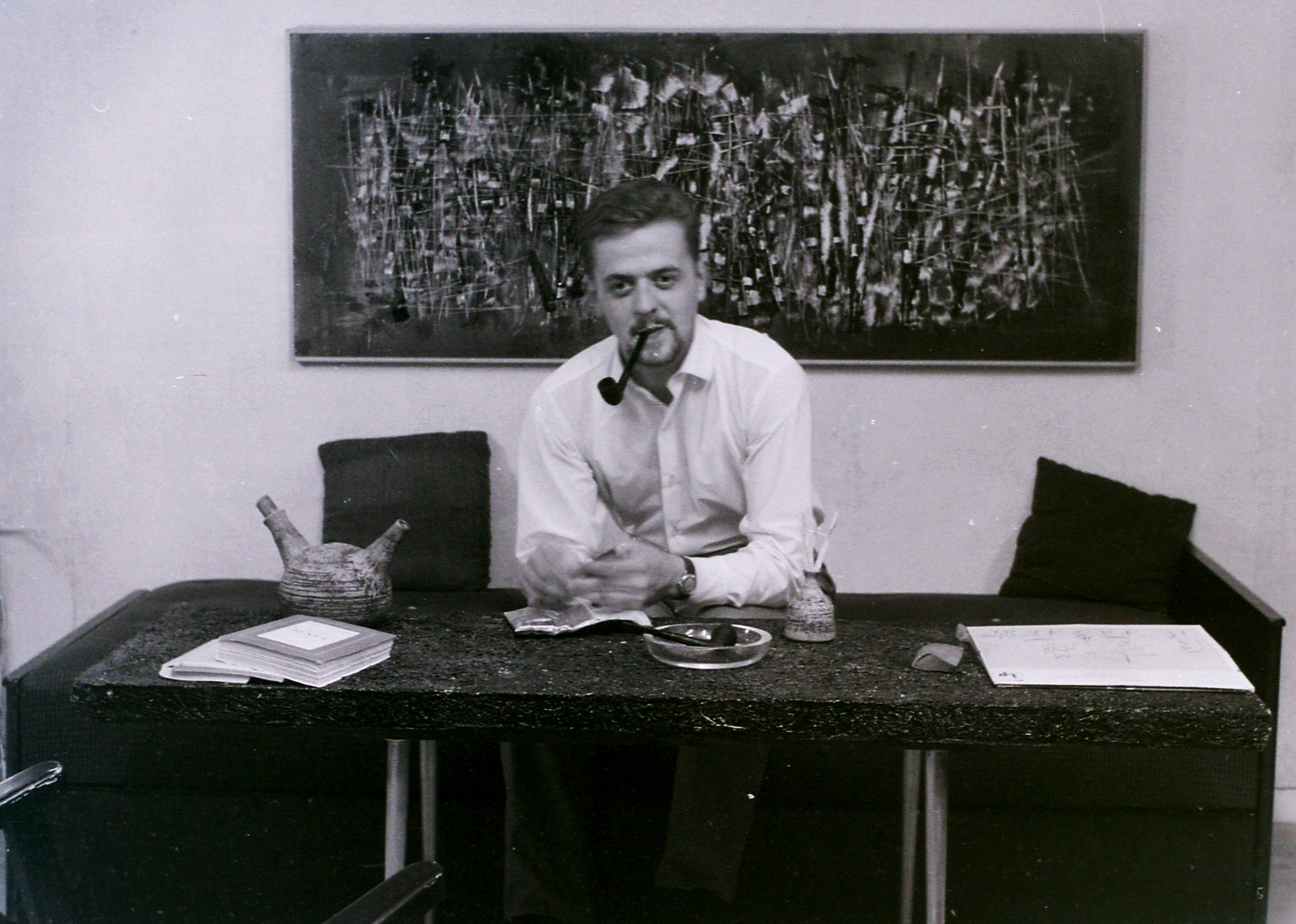
Sven Inge in 1960.

Sven Inge (born Sven Inge Höglund, later Sven Inge Demonér 1995–2006) (February 22, 1935 – November 20, 2008) was a Swedish painter and pop artist who came to some prominence in the late 1960s, doing performed visual experiments with digital technology as an art medium, and coloristic paintings.

Sven Inge was born in Umeå in 1935 and grew up in a small village in Västerbotten in northern Sweden. From early age, he was interested in drawing and became involved in experimental art after moving to Sundsvall, and later to Stockholm by the early 1960s. At the end of the 1960s, he gained notability co-producing, together with Ture Sjölander and Lars Weck, the experimental video performances Monument (1968) and Space in the Brain (1969), both made for Swedish Television. In addition to video performances, he worked with static images of science fiction and space travel, as well as a number of monumental paintings. In 1972, Inge created the photographic work Glesbygdare, and in 1973 Kronotorpare. Later, Inge worked with computerized holographic art, notably The Expanded Cube, which was performed at art galleries in the United States, Japan, and Taiwan. In the 1970s, he also worked with laser installations. As of the late 1970s, Sven Inge focused more on paintings, as well as a number of transparent three-dimensional images on acryl glass. Sven Inge was married to Rut Astrid Häggström in 1961–1967; they had no children. Inge worked and lived in Stockholm until his death in 2008.

== Name ==
Sven Inge was born Sven Inge Höglund. He was the son of Karl Hellström and Gulli Maria Höglund. In 1995, he changed his surname to Demonér (sometimes incorrectly cited as De Monér). However, as an artist, he was best known as Sven Inge; hence in 2006, he registered his middle name Inge as his new surname.
