= Edith Fischerström =

Swedish painter, graphic artist, sculptor and art teacher

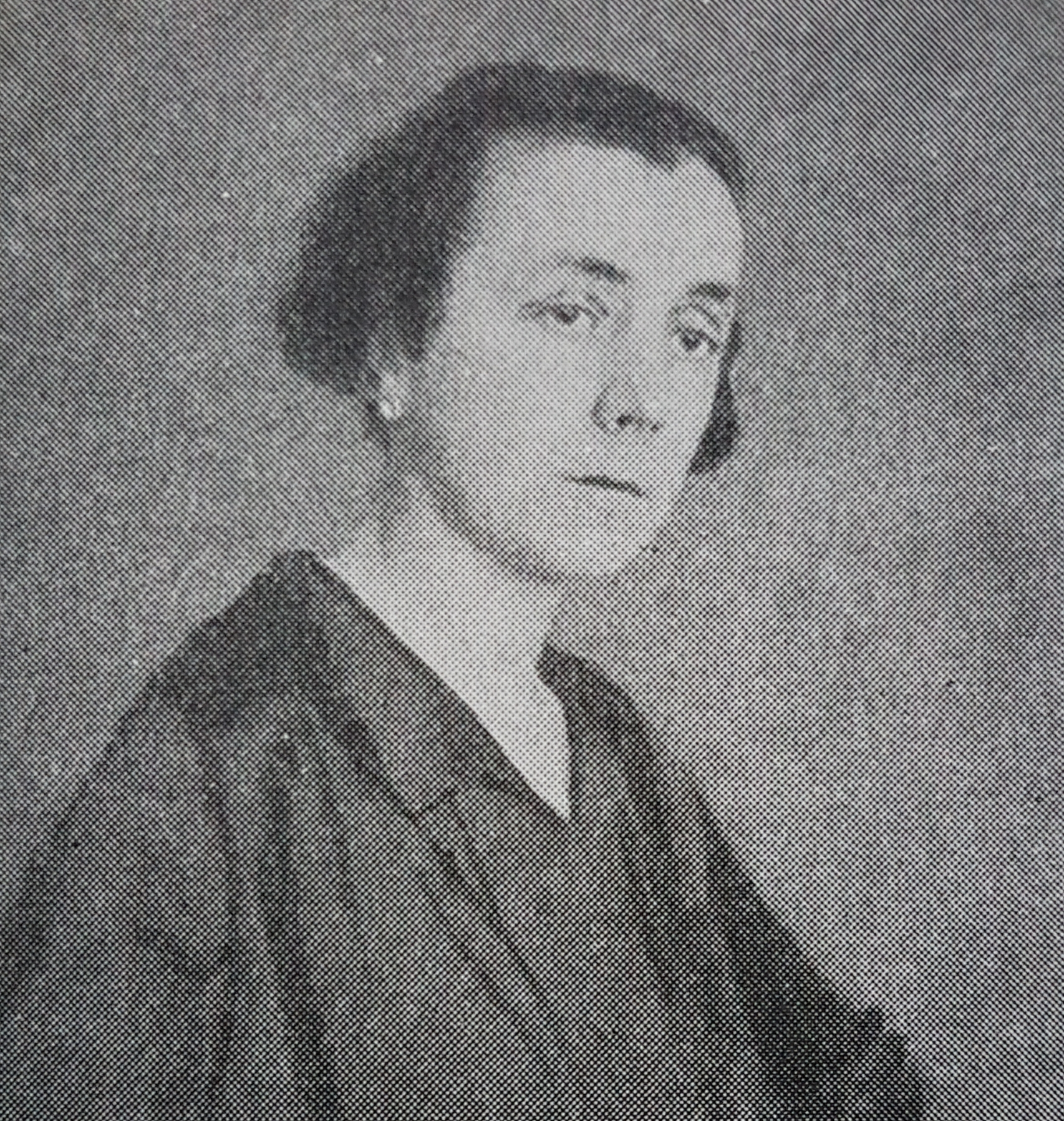
- Born: Hedvig Eleonora parish
- Resting place: Norra begravningsplatsen

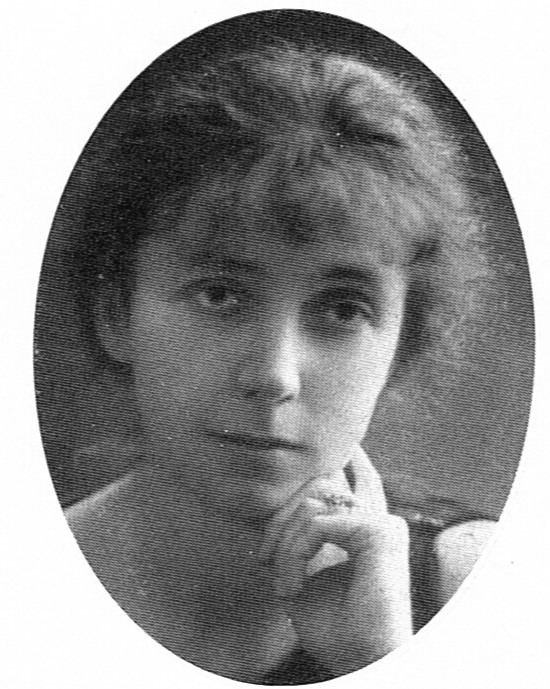
Edith Fischerstöm (date unknown)

Edith Maria Fischerström née Olsson (1881–1967) was a Swedish painter, graphic artist, sculptor and art teacher. During the first half of the 20th century she produced scenic woodcuts and painted portraits and landscapes. From the 1950s, she concentrated on portraits, including those of animals, and in her mid-1970s began to sculpt animals and busts of famous people. Her work is in the collections of several Swedish museums including Moderna Museet and Nationalmuseet.

== Biography ==
Born in Stockholm on 24 September 1881, Edith Maria Olsson was daughter of the architect Carl August Olsson(1848–1926) and his wife Elvira Vilhelmina née Wöllner (or Woelner). She was the younger of the family's two children. From 1901 to 1903, she studied at the Royal Swedish Academy of Fine Arts under Axel Jungstedt and Oscar Björck. She continued her education on study trips to France, Spain, Italy, the Netherlands and Germany. In 1905, she married the army officer Carl Fischerström with whom she had a son, Iwan, the following year and a daughter, Louise, in 1909.

From 1904 to 1906, she taught art at a private school in Sollefteå. Thereafter, as a result of her husband's postings, the family moved to various locations in Sweden. After her father died in 1922, Edith and the children moved back Stockholm. Painting mainly in oils, she displayed her work at various exhibitions including the 1914 Baltic Exhibition in Malmö. Her first solo exhibition was held in 1918, first in Lund and then in Stockholm's Nya Konstgalleriet.

In 1928, she published an album of woodcuts she had made of scenes in Stockholm followed a few years later by scenes of the west coast titled Göteborgs hamn and Götaverken. Her portraits included one of the textile artist Annie Frykholm (1934) now in Nationalmuseet while her landscapes included scenes from her travels and of Halland and Scania in Sweden. She also painted portraits, including some of animals. When she was 74, Fischerström turned to sculpture, depicting animals or creating busts of famous people. These included Karen Blixen, Anna Branting and Gerda Lundequist.

Edith Fischerström died in Stockholm on 12 October 1967, aged 84.
