= Wilhelmina Wendt =

Swedish silversmith

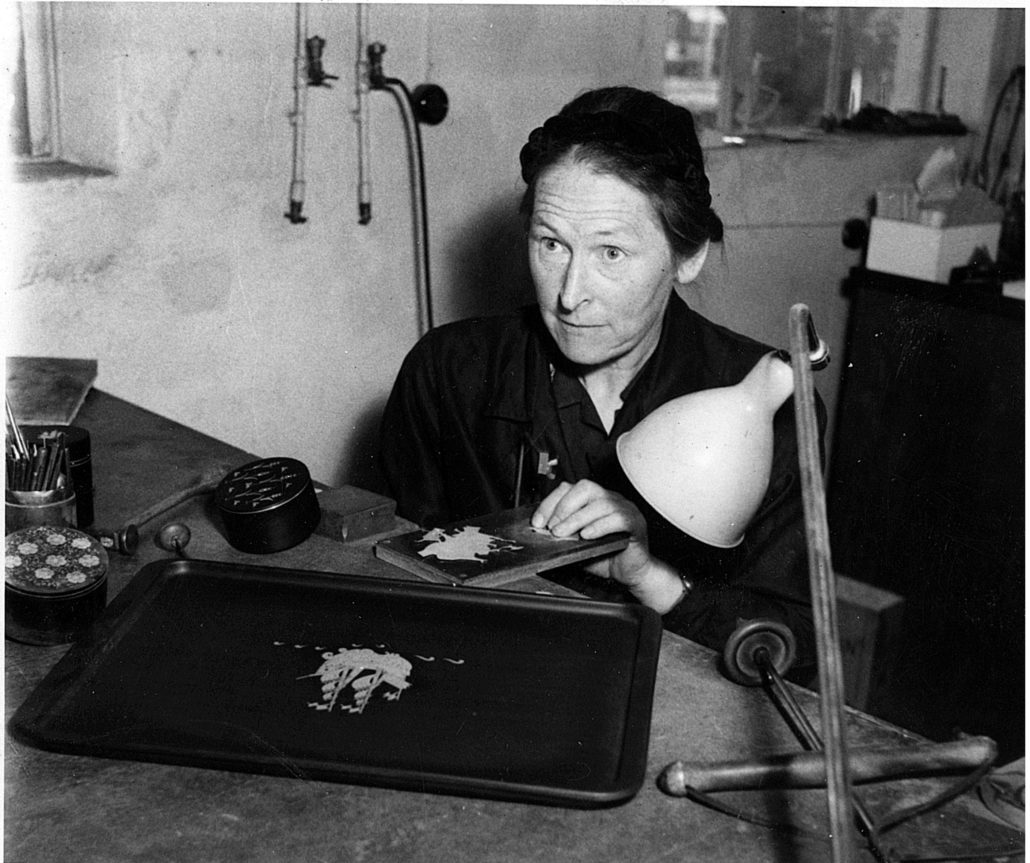
Wilhelmina Wendt

Wilhelmina Wendt (8 August 1896 – 26 June 1988), commonly known as Tiddit, was a Swedish silversmith. She was the first woman in Sweden to be granted the title of "master silversmith". From the late 1920s, she designed trays, serving dishes, bowls, jugs and jewellery. In the mid 1940s, she settled in Perstorp where she combined her father's black insulation material "isolit" with her own thin silver designs, producing artefacts in what she called "silverisolit".

== Biography ==
Born in Perstorp on 8 August 1896, Wilhelmina Wendt was the daughter of the engineer and factory owner Wilhelm Wendt and his wife Minna née Pauly. She was the fifth child in a family of 12. Disliking her given name, she called herself Tiddit or Tittit. Like her siblings, she attended schools in Helsingborg and Kristianstad. After being inspired by the designer Per Torndahl who had installed lighting in her father's factory, she moved to Stockholm where she attended the College of Arts, Crafts and Design.

On graduating as an artisan, Wendt created engraved silver-plated trays, casks, tableware, coasters, jugs and jewellery, decorated with animals, plants, ships and mythological beings. She signed herself TW. The Stockholm handicrafts association awarded her a silver medal for her creations. She contributed her works to the 1929 Paris exhibition and, for the 1930 Stockholm exhibition. presented a pewter candelabra decorated with buildings from Stockholm.

Despite a study trip to Germany in 1941, which she took with a friend on her motorbike and its sidecar, as a woman she had difficulty in finding employment. As a result, she opened her own studio in Malmö under the name Silversmedjan T. Wendt. She also had a workshop in Helsingborg. In 1946, she moved back to her native Perstorp where she opened a workshop in a former glass factory with several employees. She is remembered above all for creating works combining her silversmith designs with the black plastic-like insulating material manufactured by her father. She called the combination "silverisolit".

Wilhelmina Wendt died in Perstorp on 26 June 1988. Several of her works are in the permanent collection of Nationalmuseet.
