= Jonas Lundh =

Swedish artist (born 1965)

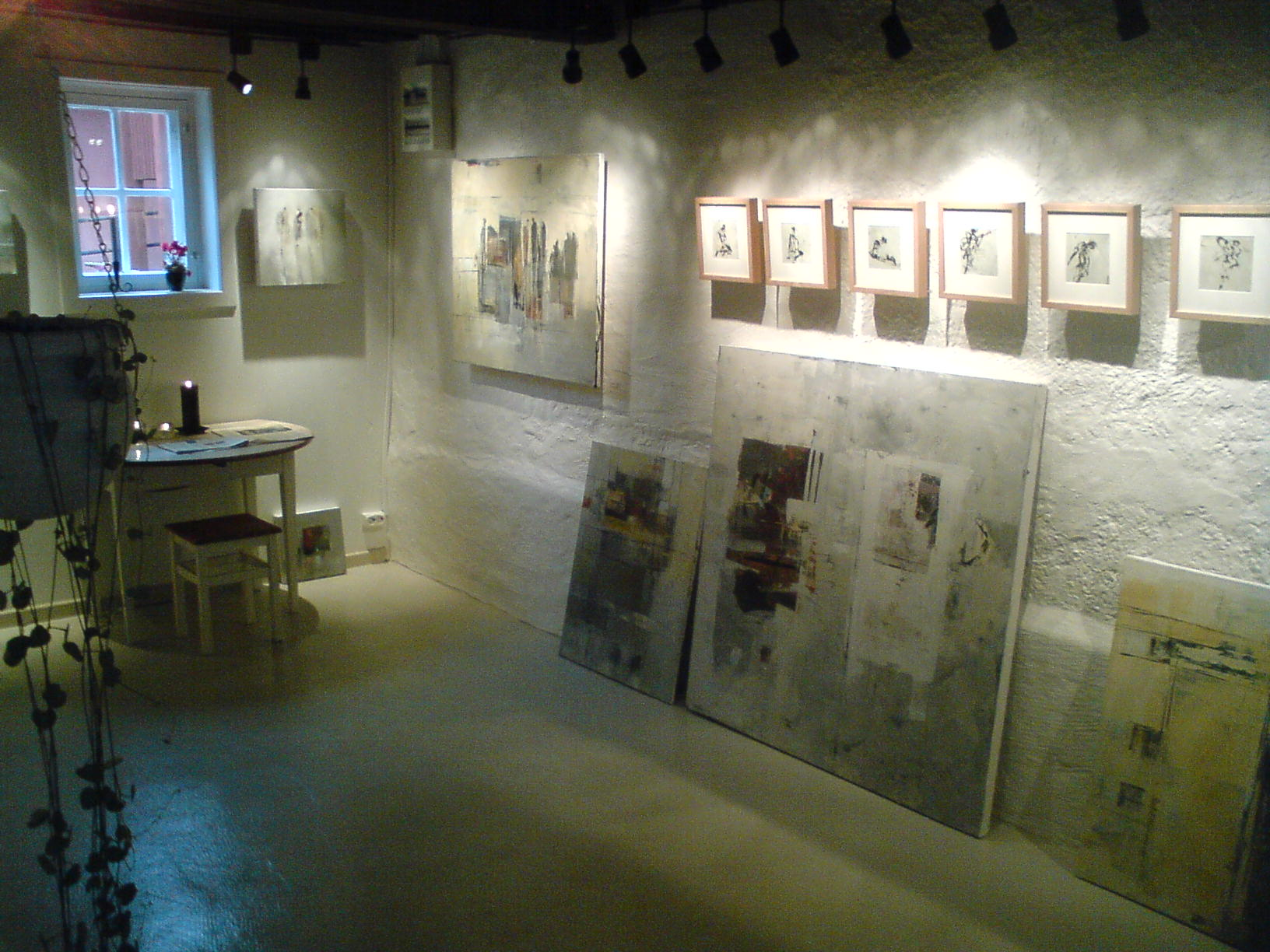
Lundh's old studio in Sölvesborg.

Jonas Lundh (born April 8, 1965 in Fagersta, Västmanland, Sweden), is a Swedish abstract expressionist artist, represented in a number of municipalities in Sweden and among collectors in the US, Great Britain, Denmark, Finland, Africa and France. Lundh creates his own world of art, where "clarity is prohibited" and rhythm is one of the main ingredients.

Lundh has developed a technique in which he paints with paperboard instead of brushes. The characteristic features of his painting are the figurative elements in his abstract images, often with mystical surfaces of emptiness. The people in Lundh's paintings are anonymous; more like symbols than individuals, and it is not difficult to see how they connect to the history of abstract expressionism. Observers have said that Jonas Lundh in his painting "reaches a cubist effect".

Lundh's art is dominated by mysticism. Some of his works have been compared to works by American painter Edward Hopper, as he has managed to concentrate the light and express something of the same loneliness in his paintings.

As one of southern Sweden's most active exhibiting painters, Lundh has also worked with installation- and video art, always with musical undertones. His ways of combining the two professions are considered brilliant. He often works with projects that include both music and painting. Lundh Meets Lindgren is a project that started in August 2007, where Lundh and guitarist Tommy Lindgren "visualize tones, sounds and rhythms in a conversation between two modes of expression". Together with Örjan Bertilsson and Alf Nilsson, Lundh and Lindgren form the band State of Art, playing modern jazz with elements of Latin, soul and funk.

In the 1980s, Jonas Lundh worked as a freelance musician, playing drums and percussion. He has also played the flute and the violin.

Jonas Lundh has spoken out against racism, saying there should not be any racism in music.

Lundh is currently a resident of Sölvesborg. He lives with his family in the rectory (from 1833), next to St Nicholas' Church (Sankt Nikolai kyrka) in central Sölvesborg. In the old monk's hut on the ground floor is his gallery with entrance from the rectory gable.
