= Gerhard Nordström =

Swedish painter and graphic artist (1925–2019)

Gerhard Nordström (often spelled as Gerhard Nordstrom; 15 August 1925 – 13 March 2019 in Lund) was a prominent Swedish painter and graphic artist. Gerhard was the son of Joel Nordström, a priest, and Ester Nordström. He was one of four children. He was raised primarily in Sjörup and Gessie, Sweden. His eldest sibling was noted actress, Karin Nordström.

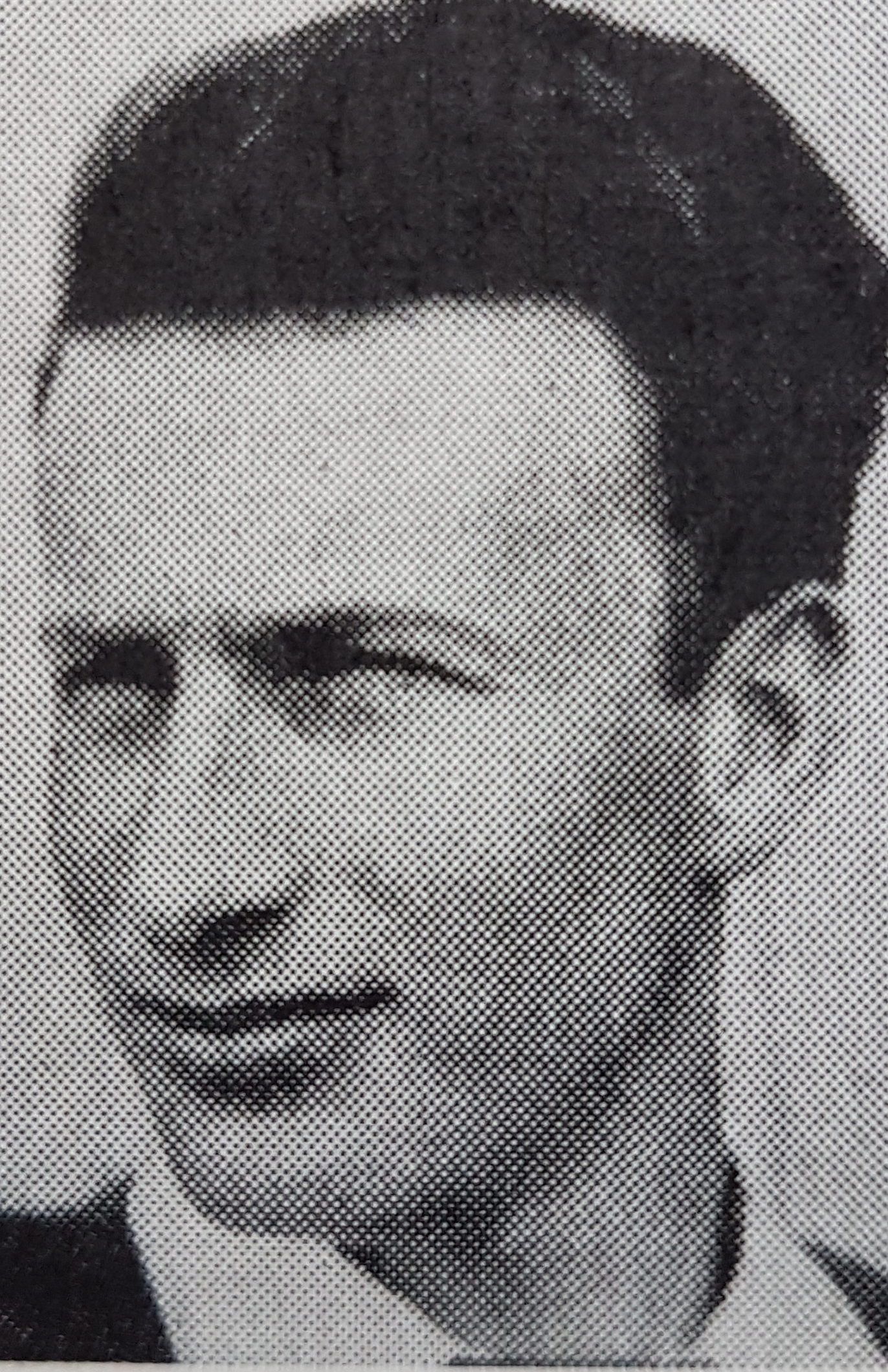
Early Photograph of Gerhard Nordström

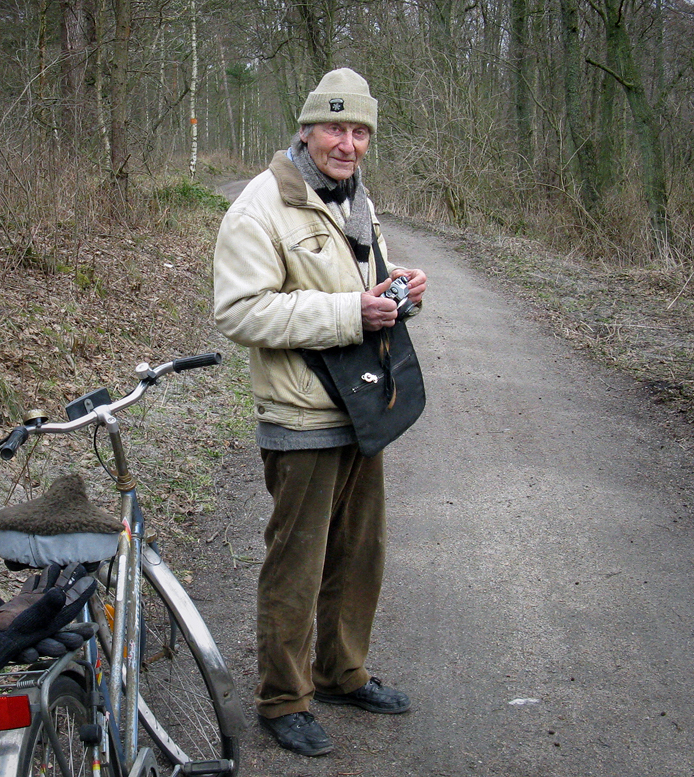
Gerhard Nordström 2010.

Gerhard attended both Skåne Painting School (Skånska Målarskolan) in Malmö (1940 - 1942) and The Royal Academy of Fine Arts in Stockholm (1943 -1949). His teacher at Skåne Painting School was the artist Tage Hansson. While attending The Royal Academy, he studied under the artist Fritiof Schüldt. During the period of 1964-1987, he was a painting teacher at the Målarskolan Forum in Malmö, along with fellow teachers Staffan Nihlén and Bertil Lundberg (Lundberg taught at "sister-school" Grafikskolan Forum).

He was best known for his 1970s works such as "Utflykt i det gröna" (Picnic in the Park), which centered on social/political commentary, and his latter works such as "Näckrosdamm" (Water Lilies), which centered on his interpretations of Monet's Gardens in Giverny, France.

During his lifetime, Nordström continued to be not only a well-regarded artist but also a popular one. As late as 2017, Nordström's works were given an exhibition by the Malmo-based art gallery "Galleri Estetica". The forty-five works presented by the gallery were sold out during the exhibition. He maintained a studio at "Bong's Old Cannery" in Ystad for a number of years. With declining health, he closed his studio but continued to paint from his home at Stortorget in Ystad.

Gerhard Nordström died at Ystad Sweden on March 13, 2019. He was 93 years of age.

== Development in graphic arts ==
Nordström began his artistic education early, at age 14, in 1939/1940. He successfully experimented with color and form. Though he received good reviews by both professors and art critics, he eventually tired of the painterly process as he felt it had "too narrow a focus on geometry and abstraction." He felt these limitations, both technical and stylistic, fundamentally limited the artist’s ability toward expression. He began to focus on graphic arts. This focus would continue from the early 1950s until the latter part of the 1960s.

Nordström believed that in graphic arts, with its stark color fields of black and white (essentially positive vs. negative space), he could successfully abandon the technical constrictions of the painterly process and become freely able to pursue the creation of "form and volume." The shift to graphic arts allowed Nordström to advance his skills as an artist and also allowed Nordström to develop the methods that he, as artist, could use to present his social commentary and beliefs. Initially, and in spite of his concern with the limitations which geometry afforded him, he nonetheless presented his graphical works in a Cubist style. Over time, his style would begin to develop much more toward abstraction. With the 1960s, and its social and political developments, Nordström’s artistic style became less concerning to him than the messages of political and social commentary that he presented in his works. Nordström himself stated whether or not his graphical work would be considered "actual" art was not his primary concern; his primary concern was the message(s) within his works. During this time, his well-known graphic works would be created. Many of these works dealt with what Nordström believed was the illogical nature of war and its subsequent costs both social and psychological.

At the close of the 1960s, Nordström’s began a process which would see him return to painting. During this time, and while still creating graphical works, he began to devise paintings which mimicked a type of wall chart popular in the school system of Sweden at that time. These charts generally provided rather benign instructional material for the students. Nordström’s paintings replicated the chart's existing and easily recognizable imagery. However, to this imagery, Nordström combined militaristic type instructions which he found in actual military manuals. The combination of these contrary elements essentially made the "message" of these charts "absurd", thereby reducing the concept of war itself to the absurd. These paintings would begin the transition of Nordström from the graphic artist to the painter. Later in his career, when Nordström had gone on to create works of vivid color, he would reflect back upon his graphical "period" and term it as "an adventure".

== Nordström's art as political / social commentary ==
Though Nordström's first art exhibition was held during the 1950s at Malmö, his broader recognition would not come until the 1970s. During this time, he created a suite of painting by which he became well known.

Nordström was personally interested in, and passionate about, the environment, social/political and humanitarian themes. Much of this interest would be translated and fused into his artwork which would come to serve as the focal point for his social commentary and viewpoints regarding power dynamics and the human toll these dynamics often caused. Nordström would become recognized as the most overtly political painter of the Swedish New Realism painters of the period.

This fusion of artistic style and personal belief/interpretations began noticeably in the early 1970s. During this time, the artist produced a series of artworks known as "Sommaren 1970" ("Summer of 1970"). These works, initially begun in 1971 on the second day of the Swedish Christmas season, were created during a turbulent time of geopolitical conflict which ultimately resulted in the Vietnam War. Nordström, like so many others, had been deeply affected by the photographs taken by Ronald Haeberle during the Vietnam War (particularly the massacre at My Lai) and subsequently published by Life magazine. Nordström used his artwork, in part, to document and comment on his feelings regarding war and its effects on humanity. His works would often blend the common "everyday" sights of "normal" and peaceful Sweden with the instantly recognizable horrors of war. Nordström has essentially used "The rhetorical grip of letting two continents and two realities overlap and meet in (the) one and the same painting." The combination of these disharmonious elements were sudden and unexpected which created an uncomfortable tension that the viewer was left to resolve or rather attempt to resolve. This interplay created a biting commentary on the dynamics between the joys and the horrors of life. Such contrasting and contradictory motifs/themes, often highlighting power dynamics and inequalities, would continue to be pursued and explored by popular contemporary artists, such as Banksy, almost forty years after the paintings Nordström had created. Stylistically, Nordström had a mastery of colour and form which he used to "evoke the presence" of a particular place. This representation, neither exact nor a full abstraction, tended toward an affinity with Photorealism. Nordström's painterly style was achieved by using a combination of soft and emollient paint which contrasted with his varying use of a thicker and coarser textured paint. The recognizable forms presented within the works, which had been created by Nordström's deliberate brushstrokes, were often merged and dissolved within other brushstrokes and within the ever-changing values of colour, light and texture. The "Summer of 1970" paintings were shown in 1972 at Galleri Doktor Glas in Stockholm. The exhibition was highly publicized by the media in Sweden. During the exhibition, prominent museums, such as Borås Konstmuseum and Moderna Museet, purchased various works within "Summer of 1970" to add to their public collections. Nordström's "Sommaren 1970" works are now considered to be among the most important of modern Swedish artworks.

During the 1990s, Nordström created another group of works which have also become synonymous with the artist. In these works, Nordström, seemed to pursue what might be considered a complete departure from his social-political themed works of the 1970s. Though stylistically related, these 1990s works center on the artist's reaction to his trips to visit the gardens created by the artist Monet.

Nordström is considered to be one of Sweden's foremost artists. Jacob Fabricius, Artistic Director of Malmö Konsthall in Malmö, Sweden (2008–2013) and Director of the Kunsthal Charlottenborg (2013-2014), has recognized Nordström as having remained one of the relatively few "politically active" painters in the Nordic community. For Fabricius, Nordström's imagery was both fascinating and evocative in that they effectively held an "atmosphere that is by turns chilling, wise, and enthralling". Since his death in 2019, auction prices for his works have often exceeded sale estimates. In 2020, a record price of 500,000 SEK was achieved for a work based on Monet's Gardens.

The Ystads konstmuseum presently has a large department dedicated to the artist. Works housed within the museum also include the seminal "De älskade Mozart" (The Beloved Mozart) an artwork also produced in the 1970s.
