= Märta af Ekenstam =

Swedish silversmith (1880–1939), also known as Marta af Ekenstam / Marta Afekenstam

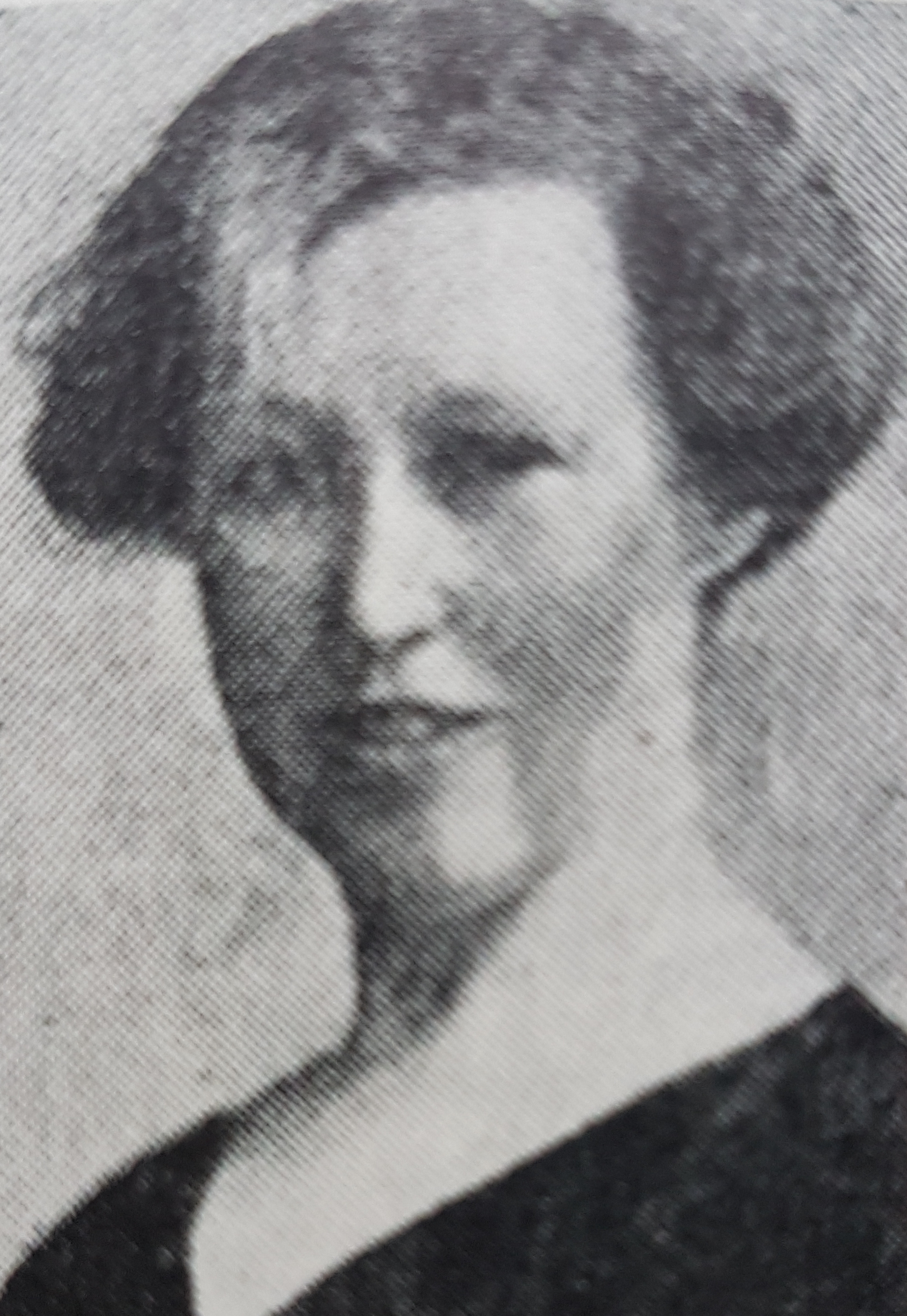
- Märta af Ekenstam
- Born: 3 May 1880; Malmö
- Died: 4 August 1939
- Occupation(s): Silversmith and creative metal worker

Märta Gunilla Matilda af Ekenstam (1880–1939) was Sweden's first female silversmith and creative metal worker. In 1913, after studying in Munich, she established her own studio in Malmö where she worked in the Jugendstil with materials including gold, silver, ivory and copper. In 1928, she married Carl Jarming who ran an art firm in Malmö. The two emigrated to the United States, settling in Pasadena. She exhibited at the 1937 World Fair in Paris and the 1939 World Fair in New York. Works by Ekenstam are in the permanent collection of Sweden's National Museum.

== Early life ==
Born in Malmö on 3 May 1880, Märta Gunilla Matilda af Ekenstam was the daughter of the army officer Gustaf Teodor Engelbrekt af Ekenstam and his wife Ester Ebba Gunilla. She was one of the family's ten children. She began her training while working as an apprentice for the silversmith Sven Bengtsson in Lund. From 1902 to 1905, she went on study trips to Germany, Italy and the Netherlands, with extended stays in Nuremberg, Leipzig and Naples. After receiving a scholarship, she was able to study in Munich from 1909 to 1913.

== Career ==
In 1909, Ekenstam became the first woman in Sweden to be authorized to work as an artisan in metalwork. In 1913, on returning to Malmö, she established her own workshop creating utensils and jewellery in the Jugendstil in various materials, often combining silver and ivory in her personalized approach. Her ornaments in enamel, silver and ivory were decorated with semi-precious stones. In 1925, she opened the art school Skånska Målarskolen. From 1927, it was operated by the painter Tage Hansson.

In 1928, she married Carl Jarmig who ran an art business in Malmö. Together they emigrated to the United States and settled in Pasadena. Ekenstam opened the Märta af Ekenstam Art and Craft firm there and held several solo exhibitions while in America.

Märta af Ekenstam died on 4 August 1939 while on a visit to Malmö. Three of her works are in the permanent collection of Sweden's National Museum.
