= Tobias Bernstrup =

Swedish artist

Tobias Bernstrup (born 17 July 1970 in Gothenburg, Sweden) is a Swedish contemporary artist working with videos, interactive works, live performances and electronic music. He received an MFA from Royal College University of Fine Arts Stockholm in 1998, where he also met up with artist colleague Palle Torsson.

== Work ==
Tobias Bernstrup belongs to a group of visual artists who produce music and perform it, and who consider this process as part of their practice as visual artists. Using the visual language of pop culture, video games, sci-fi, classicism and gothic noir, he has created a stage persona with gender-crossing live performances dressed in elaborate costumes of shiny rubber and heavy make up. In videos and animations often inhabited by his digital alter ego/Avatar and in live performances where the artist dresses as a computer game character, he raises questions about representation of identity, the body and physical space in both virtual and non-virtual realities, closely linked to critical ideas of irrealism and simulacra.

His video and live works are interconnected, however, while his videos focus on the extreme and exaggerated, his presence on the stage is a more modest physicality. His virtual world allows for one's desires to be realized within the realms of the “game,” whereas on stage, Bernstrup's presence limits the viewer to his style and specificities. His external appearance of fetish and cross-dressing, including buckles and skin-tight rubber, is tame compared to transgressions of the individual.

In 1995 Bernstrup worked in close collaboration with artist Palle Torsson, receiving international recognition as among the first visual artists to use computer games in their art practice. Their project Museum Meltdown consisted of a series of site specific computer game installations in European art museums. Using the graphics engine of existing video games such as Doom, Duke Nukem 3D, Quake and Half-Life they transformed the museum architecture into violent first-person shooter games, allowing the museum visitor to wander around a virtual version of the museum killing people and blowing up masterpieces. Torsson and Bernstrup's early video game-based projects and game representations of museums have subsequently been followed up by other by artists such as Florian Muser & Imre Osswald, Felix Stephan Huber (Germany), Feng Mengbo (China) and Kolkoz (France).

Bernstrup has continued working with game environments, reconstructing existing urban spaces such as Berlin's Potsdamer Platz and Paris' La Défense. Focusing on the artificial quality of surfaces, he linked these virtual spaces to his digital alter ego and music both in animated videos and in live performances. Several of his songs from videos and performances have been released by museums, galleries art institutions on CD or vinyl. As a recording artist Bernstrup is also known for his close collaboration and electronic compositions for Swedish video artist Annika Larsson and his track playing in the Music Locker Club and on Music Locker Radio in GTA Online.

== Exhibitions ==
- (1995) Museum Meltdown I computer game, Arken Museum of Modern Art (with Palle Torsson)
- (1997) Museum Meltdown II computer game, Contemporary Art Centre of Vilnius, (with Palle Torsson)
- (1999) Museum Meltdown III computer game, Moderna Museet, Stockholm (with Palle Torsson)
- (2001) Potsdamer Platz (Unreal Edit), computer game, Biennale De Lyon 2001
- (2002) Nekropolis, computer game, Palais de Tokyo
- (2004) XSEED 4000 de:X-Seed 4000, computer game
- (2009) performance ASFR at Madre Museum of Contemporary Art, Naples, June 26, 2009 / MADRE

== Discography ==
- 2025 “Shadow Dancer“ LP, CD, Nadanna Records.
- 2021 “Petrichor” LP, CD, Nadanna Records.
- 2018 “Technophobic” LP, CD, Nadanna Records.
- 2017 "Utopia" 12", DiscoModernism.
- 2015 "Romanticism" LP+12" and CD, Gooiland Elektro/Tonight Records.
- 2013 "Destruction" 12" EP, Gooiland Elektro/Enfant Terrible.
- 2012 "Sing My Body Electric" CD/LP/MC, Other Voices Records.
- 2011 "Strangeland" with Martial Canterel, 7" vinyl single, Mannequin Records.
- "Fat Boy" with Saralunden, vinyl 12" EP, Enfant Terrible.
- 2010 "1984", vinyl 12" EP, Enfant Terrible.
- 2009 "Hitman", mp3 single, Black Leather Records, BLR-018.
- 2008 "Midnight Blue", 12" Vinyl single, Falco Invernale Records, FIR-001.
- "The Wierd Compilation vol.II: Analogue Electronic Music 2008", Wierd Records.
- 2007 "Neon Love", 12" Vinyl single.
- "Neon Love", collector's Edition", 12" Vinyl single (edition of 100).
- "Enemies of The Earth" CD-single multiple, North Drive Press #4.
- 2006 "Wierd Compilation 1", Wierd Records, VR-001.
- 2005 "Killing Spree", Audio CD, Produced by Kunsthalle Nürnberg.
- "SUV", mp3 single.
- 2003 "Ventisette", Italian version, 12" Vinyl single.
- "Ventisette", collector's Edition", 12" Vinyl single (edition of 100).
- 2002 "Re-Animate Me", Audio CD, Produced by Färgfabriken.
- "27 remix", 12" Vinyl single (edition of 500).
- "27 collector's Edition", 12" Vinyl single (edition of 100).
- 1998 "Images of Love", Audio CD-R (edition of 20).
- 1997 "The Heat of the Night", Audio CD-R (edition of 25).
