= Gillis Hafström =

Swedish artist

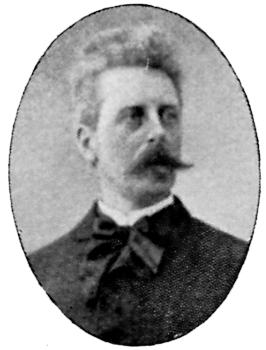
Gillis Hafström

Axel Gillis Hafström (3 January 1841 – 18 November 1909) was a Swedish painter, art conservator and restorer from Gothenburg.

He studied at the Chalmers Crafts School (Chalmersska slöjdskolan) in Göteborg and then from 1861 to 1865 at the Royal Swedish Academy of Fine Arts in Stockholm. In 1866–67 he worked as a drawing teacher for the elementary schools authority in Uppsala. He spent most of the years from 1870 to 1875 in Düsseldorf and 1877–78 in Paris, where he studied art and also worked on restoring oil paintings. He became an agré (junior member) of the Royal Swedish Academy in 1879. He was one of the painting and drawing tutors of Prince Eugen.

Hafström mostly painted genre works and is represented, among other places, in the Nationalmuseum in Stockholm.

== Gallery ==
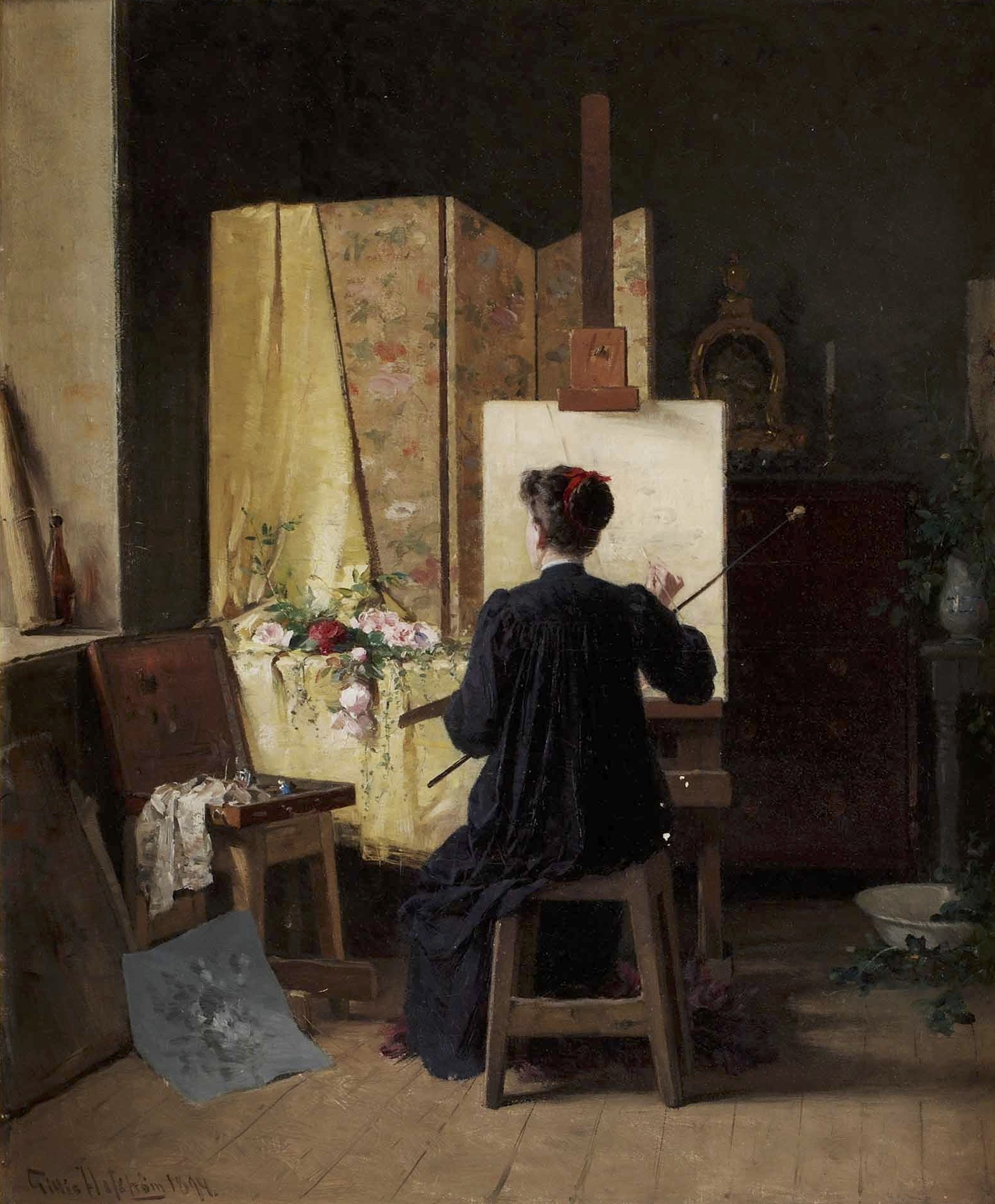
I ateljén (1894)

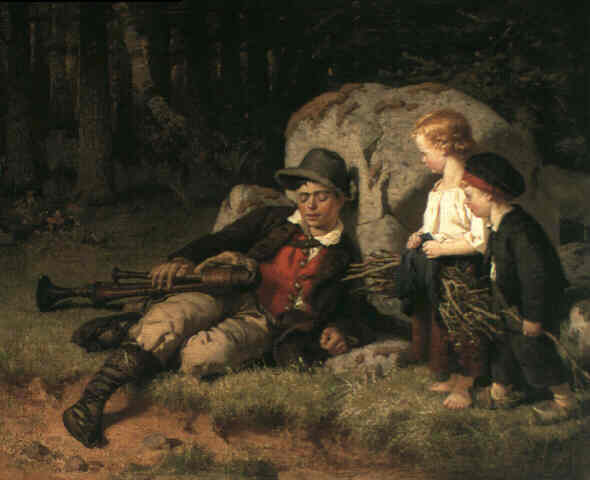
Sovande säckpipsblåsare
