= Ibe Dahlquist =

Swedish silversmith (1924–1996)

- Born: Inga-Britt Dahlquist; 1924
- Died: 1996 (aged 71–72)
- Occupation: Silversmith

Inga-Britt "Ibe" Dahlquist (1924–1996) was a Swedish silversmith who established a workshop in Visby on the island of Gotland where she worked for many years, collaborating with her neighbour Olov Barve. A necklace combining silverwork and fossils she found on the beach is in the permanent collection of the Nationalmuseum.

== Biography ==
Born in 1924, Dahlquist was a native of the island of Gotland. After studying at the Swedish School of Arts, Crafts and Design in Stockholm, she gained prominence in the 1950s, creating silver jewellery enhanced with fossils she found on the beach. She established a workshop in Visby, collaborating with the jeweller Olof Barve. It was Dahlquist who worked on designing the items while Barve completed their creation. Together they produced a series of jewellery set in silver together with unworked fossils and stones collected on Gotland's beaches. They submitted the series to the exhibition of contemporary jewellery (Utställing Nutidssmycken 1959) organized by the National Museum of Sweden in 1959. It was thanks to this exhibition that Dahlquist became more widely known.

After being engaged by Georg Jensen in 1965, Dahlquist designed more austere jewellery in the modernist style, adding intricate links to her necklaces and bracelets. Her work can be seen in museums throughout Sweden, including the National Museum which holds a necklace she designed in 1959. Three of her works produced by Georg Jensen's factory are held by the British Museum.

Ibe Dahlquist died in 1996.
