= Palle Torsson =

Swedish artist (born 1970)

Palle Torsson (born 1970 in Stockholm, Sweden) is a contemporary artist working with videos, interactive works, live video games and performance. He received a MFA from Royal College University of Fine Arts Stockholm in 1998, where he also met up with artist colleague Tobias Bernstrup.

== Career ==
In 1995, Torsson closely collaborated with artist Tobias Bernstrup with whom he got international recognition as the first group of visual artists to use computer games in their art practice.

Their project, Museum Meltdown, consisted in a series of site specific computer game installations in European art museums. Using the graphic engine of existing video games such as Doom, Duke Nukem 3D, Quake and Half-Life they transformed the museum architecture into violent first-person shooter games where the museum visitor could wander around inside a virtual version of the museum killing and blowing up master pieces. Torsson and Bernstrup's early video game based projects and game representations of museums have later been followed by other by artists such as Florian Muser & Imre Osswald, Felix Stephan Huber (Germany), Feng Mengbo (China) and Kolkoz (France).

After his collaboration with Bernstrup, Palle Torsson have continued to work with game related work like Sam exhibited at Palais de Tokyo, Paris in 2001 and Evil Interiors.

Since 2005, he is also working with the Swedish anti-copyright organization Piratbyrån, especially with the website Art Liberated.org.

== Notable works ==
- Assvideo (1996 - 1997) - videos and video performance
- Museum Meltdown I - computer game (1995) at the Arken Museum of Modern Art (with Tobias Bernstrup)
- Museum Meltdown II - computer game (1997) at the Contemporary Art Centre of Vilnius (with Tobias Bernstrup)
- Museum Meltdown III - computer game (1999) at the Moderna Museet, Stockholm (with Tobias Bernstrup)
- Minus Porn - photographs and website (1999)
- Pippi Examples - (2001) censored video based on Pippi Longstocking
- Sam - (2001): Half-Life computer game modification about the five-year-old girl Sam, Palais de Tokyo, Paris
- Text Voyeur - (2002), real-time 24hour streaming-work based on Limewire, Kiasma, Helsinki
- Evil Interiors - (2003) computer game reconstructions from movies like Psycho, Reservoir Dogs, and Scarface
- Artliberated.org - (2005) website for freedom of speech

== See also ==
- Video game art
