= Roine Jansson =

Swedish artist and illustrator

Roine Jansson (born 11 November 1952) is a Swedish artist and illustrator. His work focuses on modern mine workers, mining in Northern Europe, and the trade workers movement in the EU.

== Biography ==
Jansson was born on 11 November 1952, in Uppsala and currently lives in Österbybruk, Sweden. He studied Art at Uppsala University, Uppsala, Sweden, and sculpture at Konstfack. He has worked as an iron miner and is currently a firefighter. He has been painting since the early 1970s and has created public art for the cities of Stockholm, Uppsala, and Österbybruk. In his work he uses a variety of mediums and techniques, such as charcoal, oil, watercolor, fresco-secco, wood, and stone.

== Books ==
- Gruvarbetare i ord och bild (Miners in words and pictures) Roine Jansson, och Math Isacson, Repro 8 AB Stockholm, Sweden. 2011, Swedish, 211 p, ISBN 978-91-976175-6-7, An illustrated history of modern mine workers in Sweden, France and Belgium.
- Kvinnors liv och arbete i Europa: röster från industri och lantbruk i Belgien, Frankrike, Luxemburg och Sverige (Women's lives and work in Europe: voices from industry and agriculture in Belgium, France, Luxembourg and Sweden) Carmelina Carracillo, Roine Jansson Cuesmes : Cerisiers France, 2002, Swedish, 181 p, ISBN 2-87267-068-8 .
- "Några gjorde hålen..." (Some Made the Holes ...) Mary Hamberg & Roine Jansson Hamberg, (INB) Stockholm: Backstrom, 2004 Swedish 182, p. ISBN 91-89394-23-2 Short stories about miners with watercolor illustrations
