= Sven Erixson =

Swedish painter and sculptor

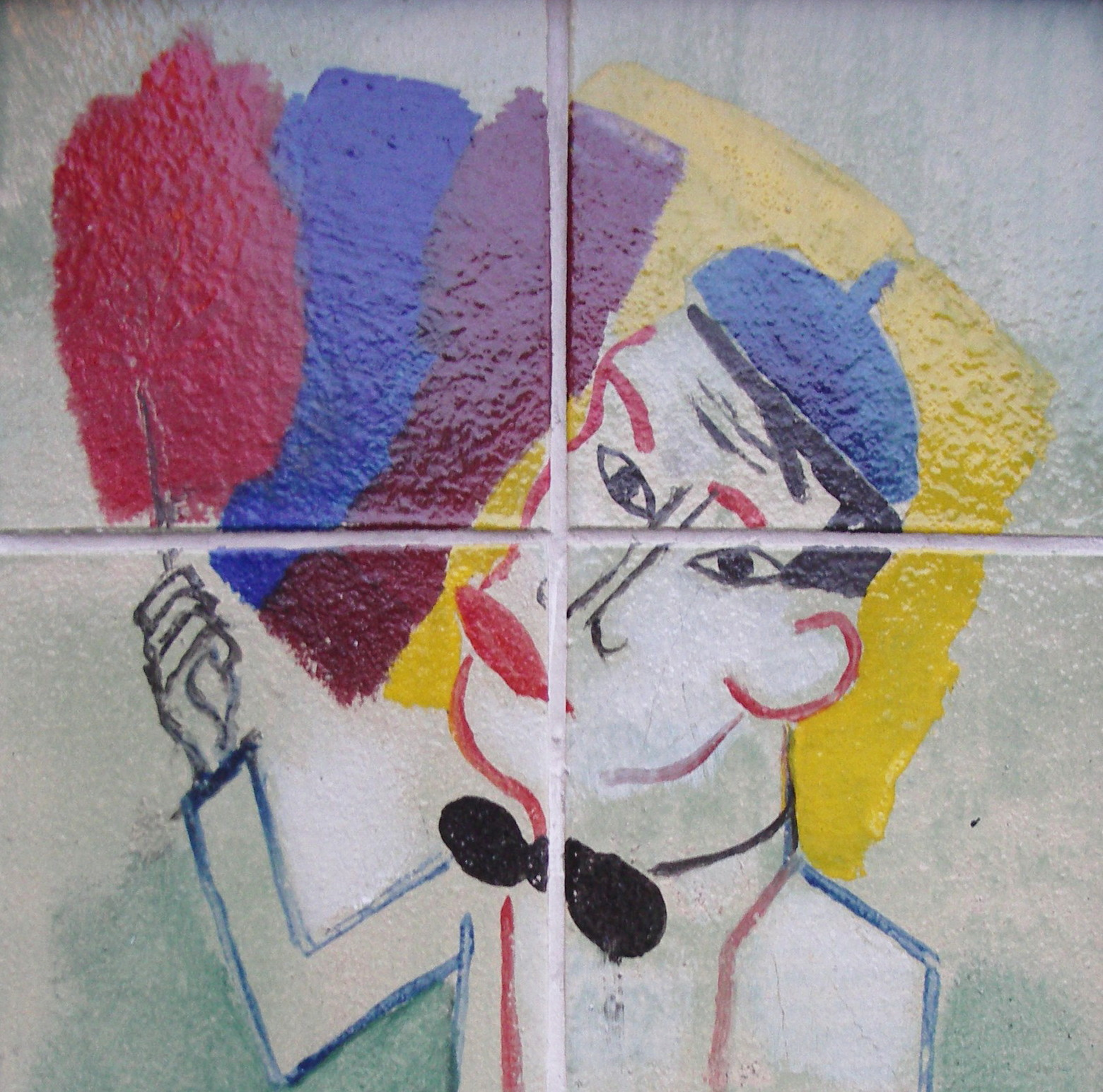
- Portrait of Sven Erixson by Acke Oldenburg.
- Born: Sven Leonard Erixson; 23 November 1899; Tumba, Sweden
- Died: 17 May 1970 (aged 70); Saltsjöbaden, Sweden
- Notable work: Lorca's Blood Wedding, 1944

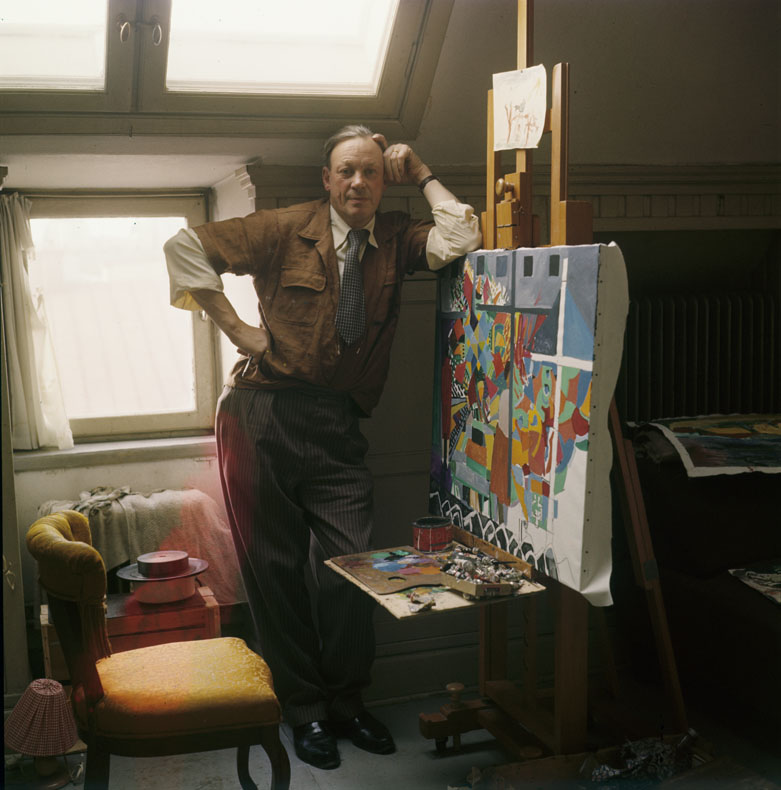
Sven Erixson in his studio.

Sven "X-et" Leonard Erixson (23 November 1899 – 17 May 1970) was a Swedish painter and sculptor. Born in Tumba, son of Alfred and Mathilda Eriksson, he was married to Ingeborg Erixson with whom he had two children: a son, the artist Sverre Erixson (born 1932) and a daughter, the actor Irma Erixson (born 1937).

== Early life ==
Erixson's journey to becoming an established artist was a long one. He started his apprenticeship to a master painter at age of 14. He continued his artistic education by studying decorative painting, while he took a position as a teacher of drawing at the Konstfack. This was followed by a year of study at the Royal Swedish Academy of Arts, to which he later returned as a Professor of painting 1943–53.

== Career ==
Erixson's artistic production was extensive and diverse. He painted landscapes with figures, city and port pictures, interiors, floral pieces. He drew inspiration from a variety of sources, ranging from Medieval Folk art to German Expressionism. He devoted a significant time throughout his artistic life to travel, the source of various motifs, mostly from Spain and the south of France. During his travels he was always keen on study both old masters and the biggest contemporary artists of his time: Goya and Velazquez at Museo del Prado; El Greco in Toledo; Paul Klee, Lovis Corinth, Gustav Klimt and Egon Schiele at the Bavarian National Museum.

Erixson belong to Sweden's great modern painters, and his work is represented in most Swedish art museums. He was one of the artists who in 1932 started the artist-led gallery 'Color and shape' (Färg och Form) in Stockholm. His many artistic commissions include frescos at the Holy Cross Chapel at Woodland Cemetery in Stockholm (1938 to 1940), as well as his great fresco in the town hall of Huddinge (1948 to 1949), into which he wove his own childhood memories of the railroad town. Alongside his painting, Erixson often tried other artistic tasks, often involving his decorative imagination. For example, he created the theatrical decor of Garcia Lorca's Blood Wedding (1944), and the decor and costume sketches for the opera Aniara (1959).

== See also ==
Works by Erixson at Moderna Museet, Stockholm and Malmo
