= Hans Ehrich =

Swedish industrial designer

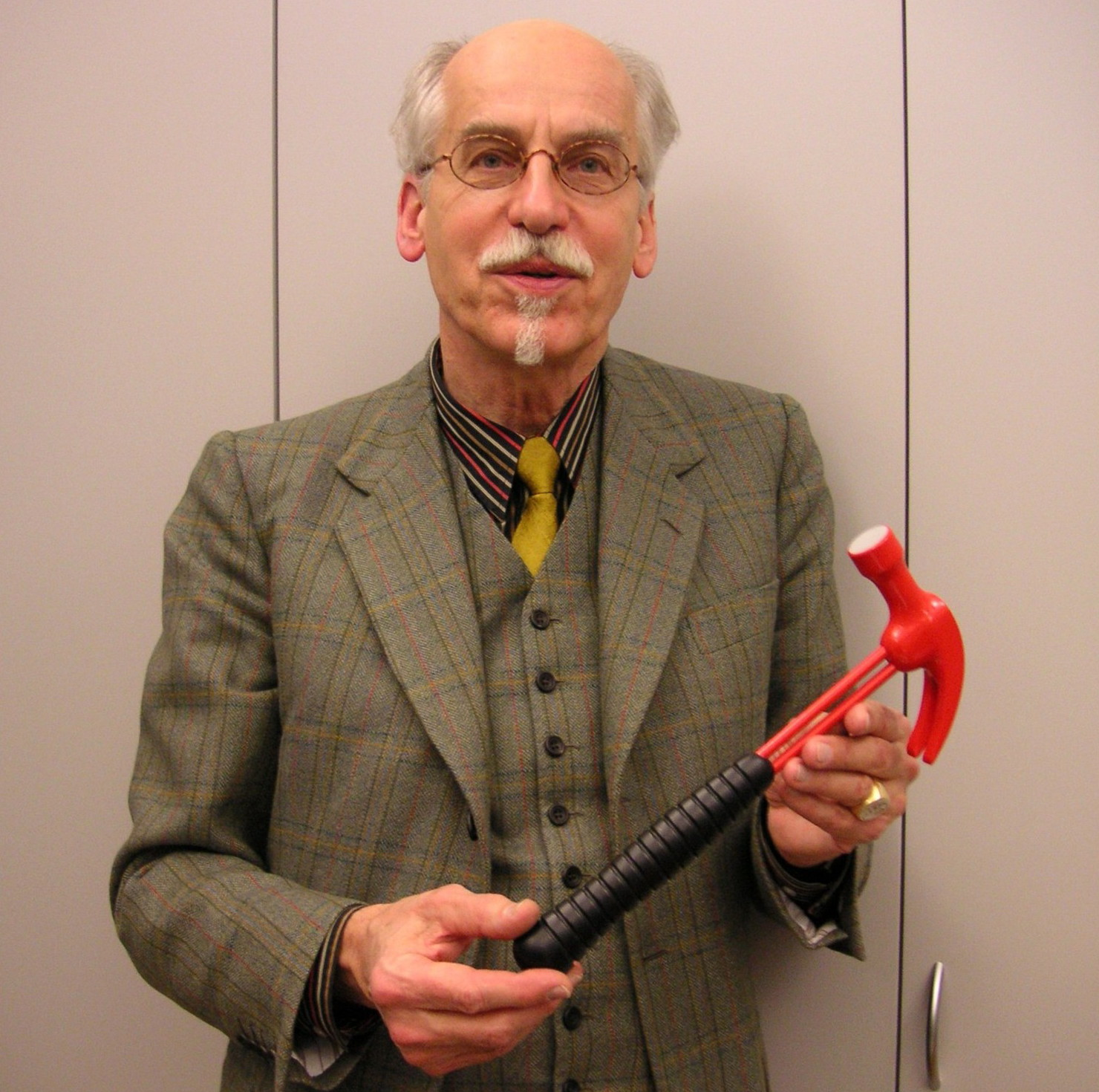

Hans Ehrich (born 25 September 1942) is a Swedish industrial designer. Together with Tom Ahlström he, in 1968, founded A&E Design, a company which Ehrich still (2022) manages. Between 1982 and 2002 he was the CEO of the sister company Interdesign in Stockholm. Internationally, he is regarded one of Sweden's leading product designers, and is referred to as the “Grand Seigneur” of Swedish industrial design. Ehrich is living in Stockholm and Berlin.

== Growth and education ==
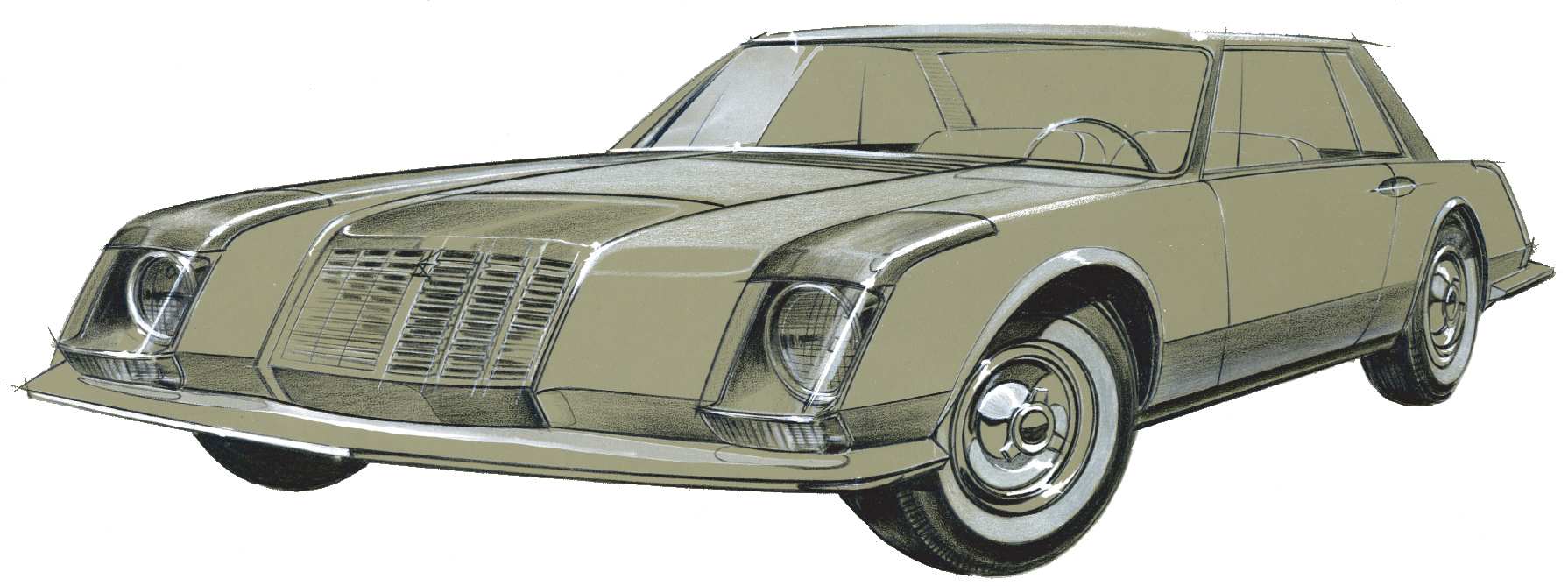
Sportcoupé, Ehrichs design study, Turin 1965.

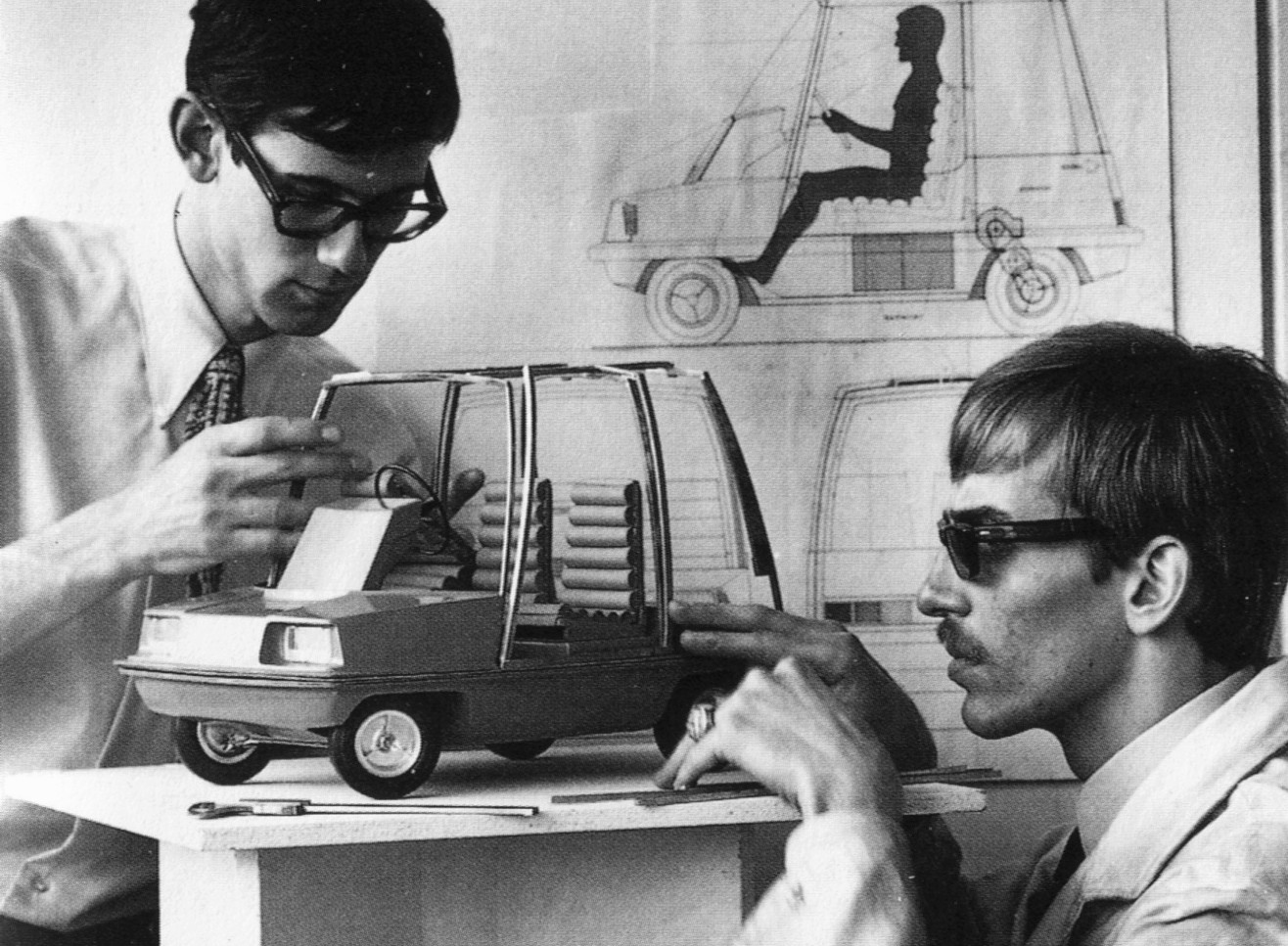
Ehrich (right) with the electric town car "Optima", 1967.

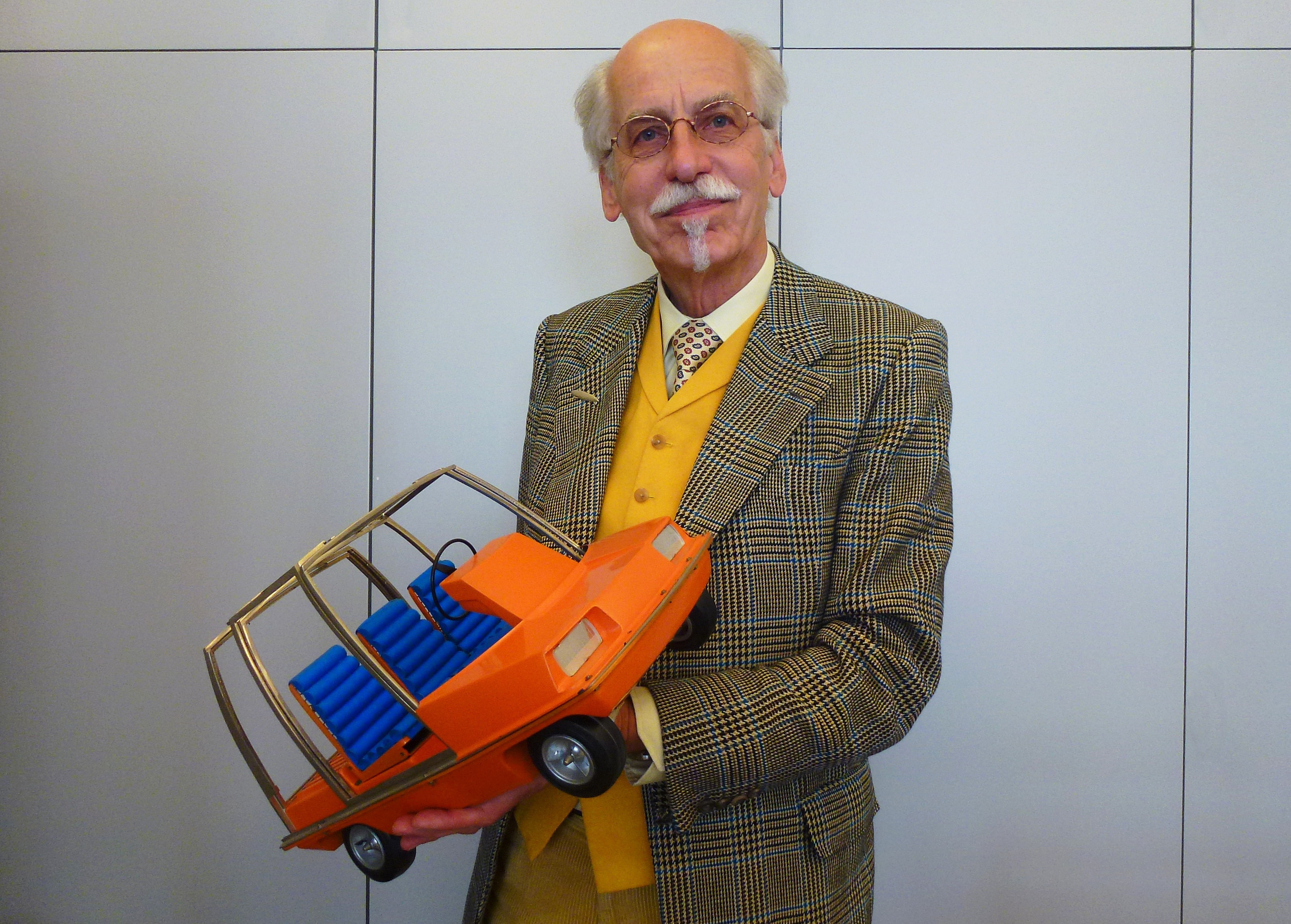
Ehrich and "Optima" 2015.

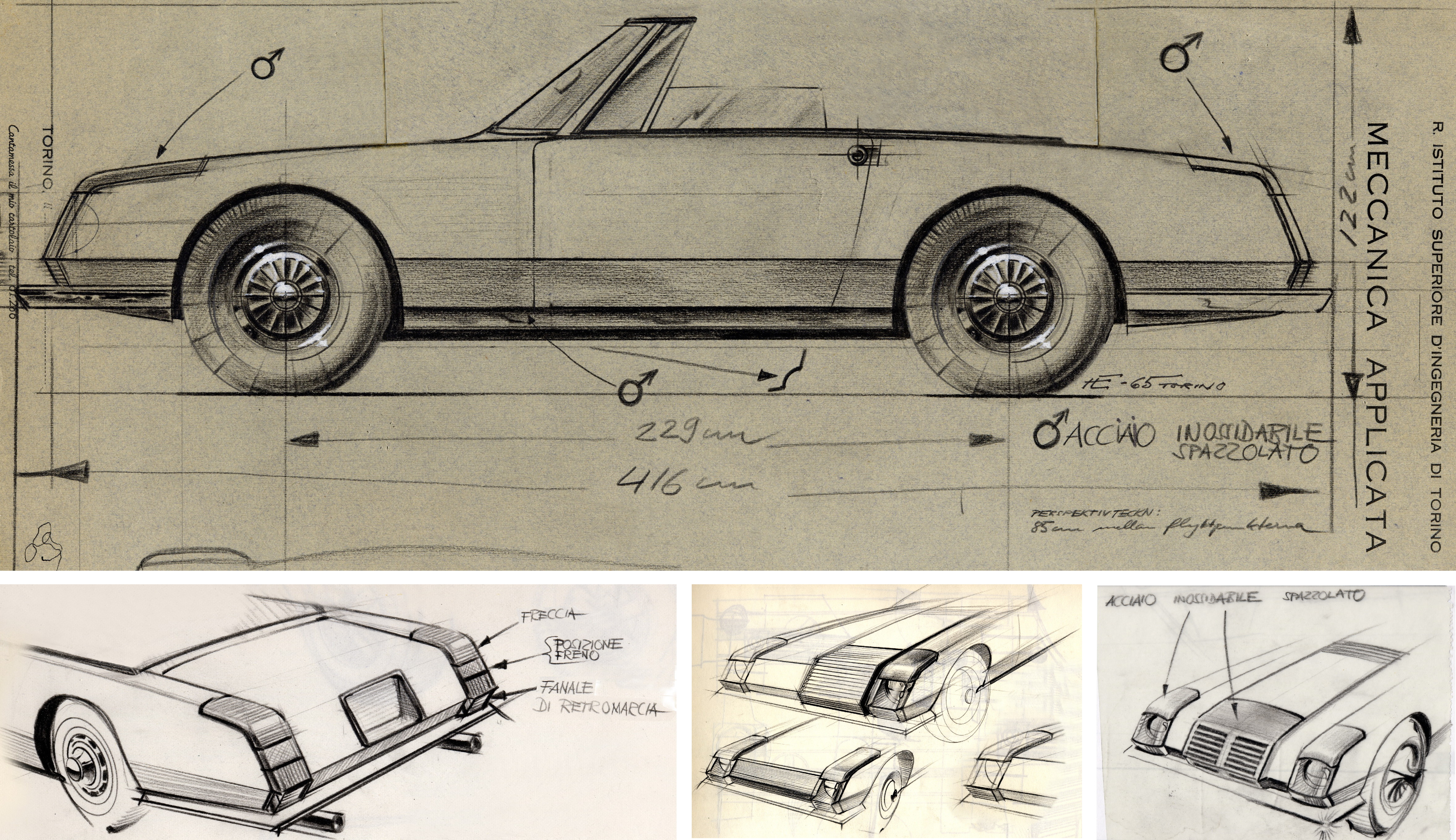
"2,5 Litre Gran Turismo Convertible", 1965.

Hans Ehrich's mother was the Swedish woman Liten-Karin Sundberg, and his father the German artist Otto Ehrich, who in 1936 emigrated to Finland, where the son Hans was born in Kulosaari (currently Helsinki) in 1942. During the Finnish Continuation War the family fled to Sweden in 1944.

Hans Ehrich is grown up and educated in Finland, Sweden, Germany, Switzerland, Spain and Italy. His German higher school examination (Abitur) he passed in Italy, at the Scuola Germanica di Roma. In early sketches from his teens Ehrich showed that he already was a skilful drawer. He created a design sketch for the interior of an open car with ergonomically shaped seats, neck rests and separated back seats already at an age of 16 years.

From 1962 to 1967 he studied at the department for metal crafts, with concentration on silver and goldsmith training at the University College of Arts, Crafts and Design (Konstfack) in Stockholm. He mixed his studies with trainee periods at Italian car producers in Milan and Turin, where he, among others, met Giorgetto Giugiaro, who asked him to join the recently established Italdesign company. The result of the studies in Turin was a large number of car design projects, among those a “Two door Sports Coupé” and a “2,5 Litre Gran Turismo Convertible”.

Ehrich's passion for cars was also expressed in his industrial design examination project at Konstfack in 1967. Together with Roland Lindhé, he developed a most paid attention to electric town car with three seats, called “Optima”. The self-supporting body of the concept car was intended to be made of plastic and aluminum. It had, among many other items, pump-free and puncture- proof tires, safety belts and a smooth and soft, shock-absorbing interior. Ehrich's and Lindhé's car existed only as a mock up, but the information about it was spread worldwide by a Swedish news agency. The authors were contacted from different countries, by people who wanted to buy the car. “Optima” was rewarded the first prize in the Ford design competition, presented in Munich in 1967.

In the following year, the future partner Tom Ahlström designed a complete furniture collection in plastic as his examination subject at Konstfack. The same year Ahlström and Ehrich decided to start their A&E Design company.

== Works ==
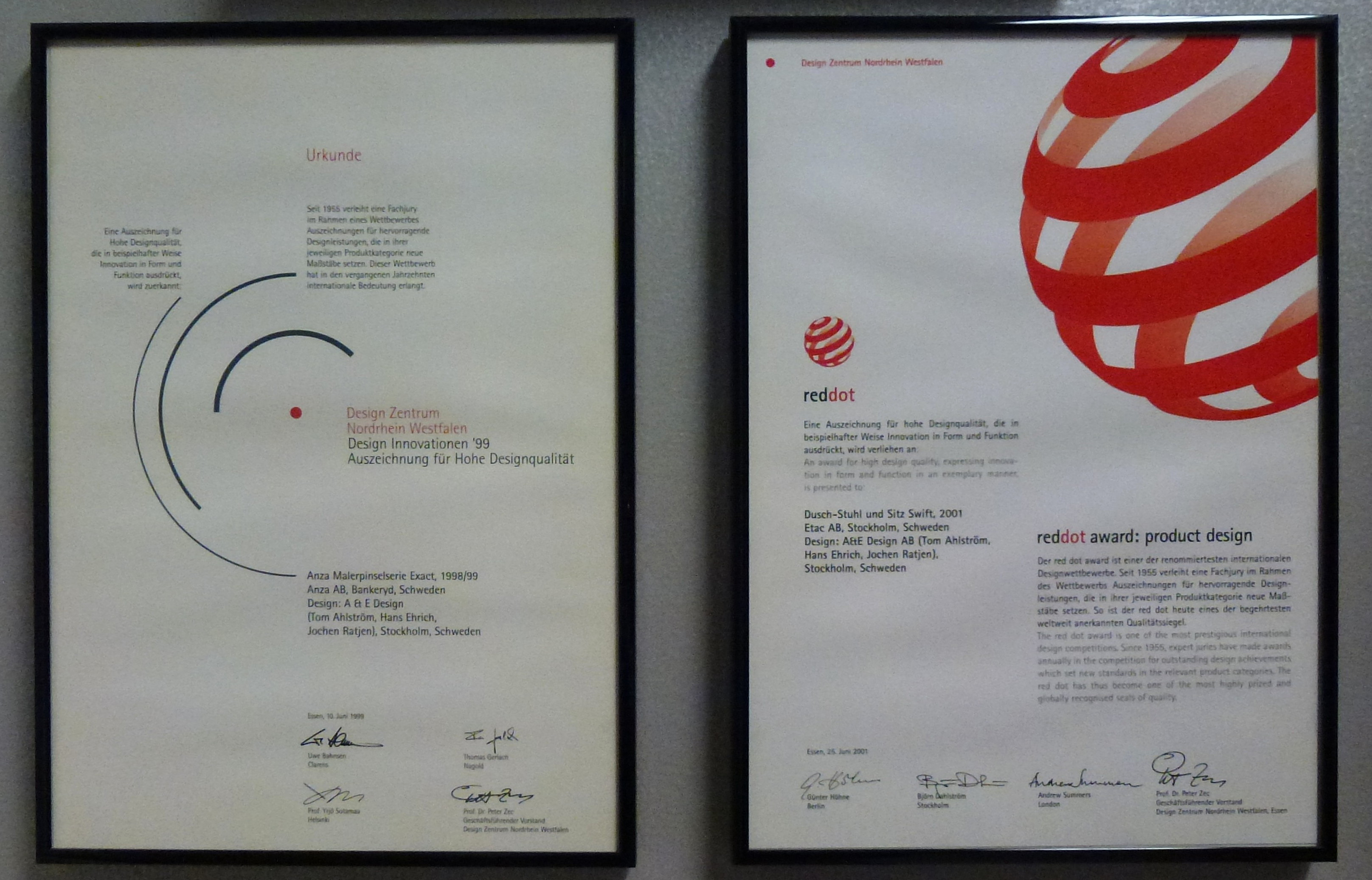
Red dot design award for A&E Design 1999 and 2001.

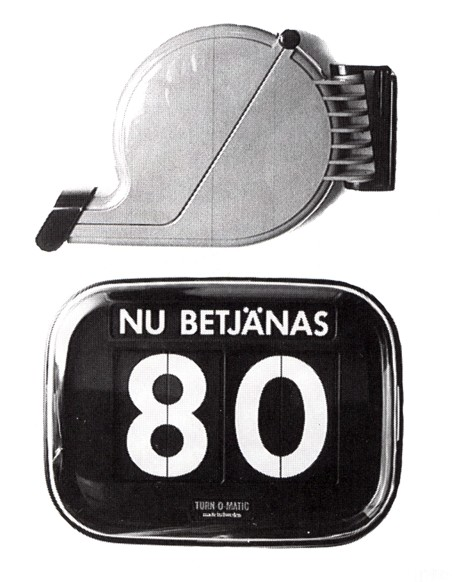
Turn-O-Matic M80

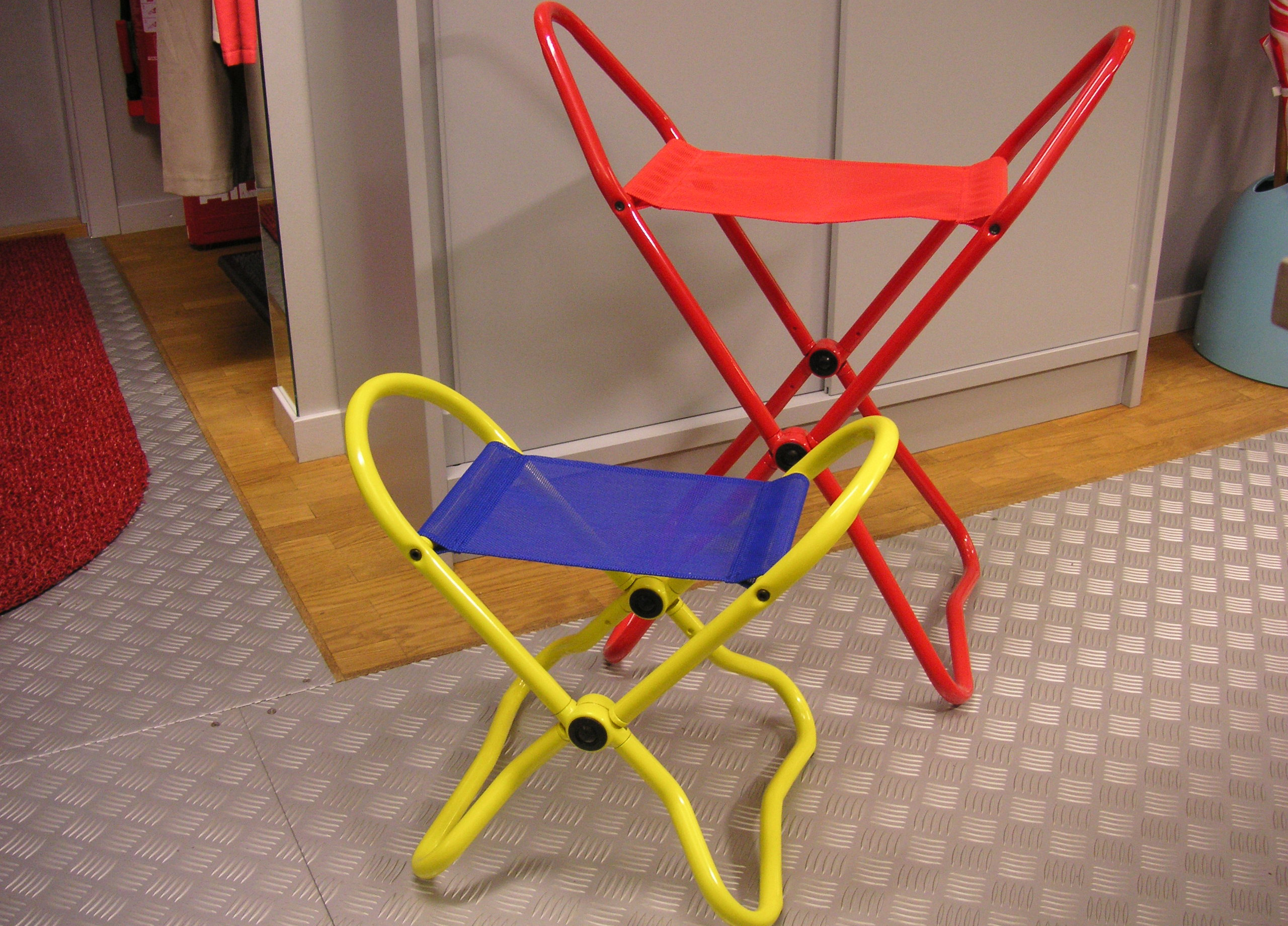
The folding stool "Stockholm II" (red) and child version "Snupi".

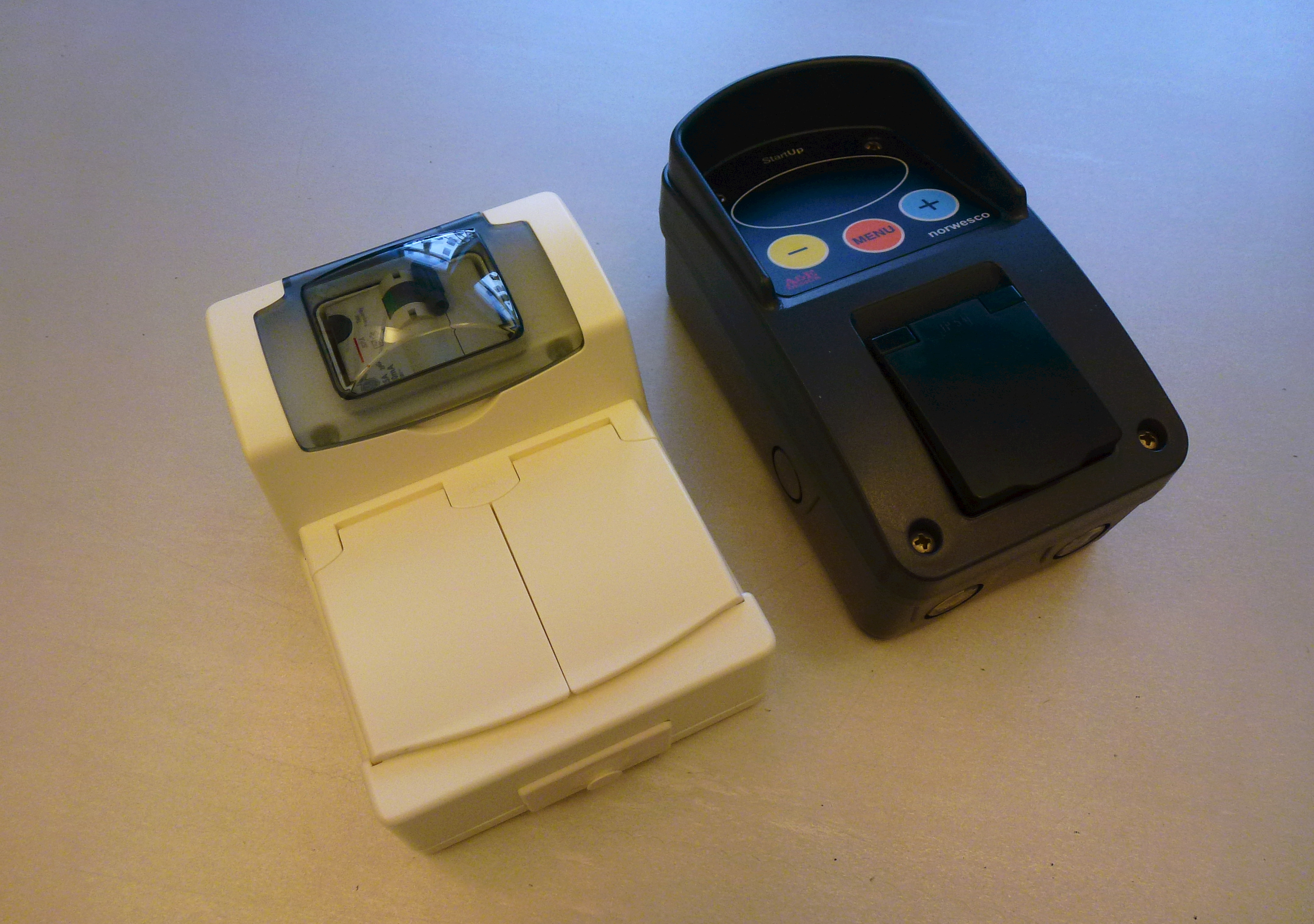
Ehrichs latest work for A&E Design: residual-current device (2015) and timer (2014).

The first commission of the new design consultancy was to create a paintbrush with a comfortable grip, made of polypropylene plastic. The client was satisfied, and the brush became a bestseller. This was the beginning of the design of a large number of products, produced of different types of plastic, using different techniques.

A&E Design soon became internationally known and awarded for its design of a number of products, such as the dishwashing brush “1230”, the bath board “Fresh”, the shower- and toilet chair “Clean” and the folding stool for museums “Stockholm II”. The stool today (2017), is present in more than 1600 museums worldwide, not as an exhibit, but to offer museum visitors comfortable support and convenient assistance.

Also well known is the “Turn-O-Matic M80” queue ticket dispenser and number indicator, introduced in 1974. In 2005, when Sweden celebrated “The Year of Design”, the work of Swedish designers was honored by the Swedish Post through the issuance of six stamps featuring well-known products, one of which depicted the “Turn-O-Matic” queue ticket dispenser.

The dish washing brush and the queue ticket dispenser, the folding stool, together with several more creations from A&E Design are part of the permanent collection of the Nationalmuseum. The “Stockholm II” folding stool is also in the permanent collections of the Museum of Modern Art (MoMA) in New York and the Pinakothek der Moderne in Munich.

Until the year 2002, A&E Design had been rewarded the “Excellent Swedish Design” (14 times), the “Red Dot” (5 times, of which 3 in the category “The Best of the Best”), together with a considerable number of national and international design awards. The worldwide successes have led to the nomination of Hans Ehrich as a member of the jury of the “red dot design award” since 2002.

== Foundation for Industrial Design ==
In 2022, Hans Ehrich founded the "Foundation for Industrial Design", which has the task of rewarding a young, promising industrialdesign student with a scholarship and a diploma. Four professors, working at four prominent universities with design education at the university level, will each nominate a candidate. A jury will then select the winner of "The Hans Ehrich Design Award for Excellent Young Industrial Design". The award ceremony will take place in Vitemölla and the prize money in 2022 is SEK 85,000.
