= Caroline Schlyter =

Swedish artist

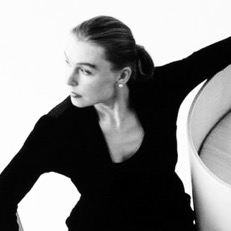
- Born: Anna Ingrid Caroline Schlyter; October 9, 1961 (age 64); Stockholm, Sweden
- Education: Konstfack
- Alma mater: Royal Institute of Art
- Notable work: Little h
- Website: www.carolineschlyter.com

Anna Ingrid Caroline Schlyter (born 9 October 1961) is a Swedish artist focusing on sculpture and installations. She is best known for her furniture sculptures that have been exhibited in numerous countries.

== Early years and education ==
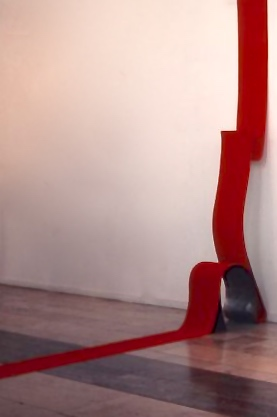
Steel prototype chair Little h (1988), covered with red velvet, Kulturhuset, Stockholm, 1989

Caroline Schlyter was educated at Konstfack, Department of Fine Art and at Royal Institute of Art in Stockholm. In 1988, at the beginning of her studies, Schlyter created a rolled steel prototype of a chair that she named Lilla h (known as Little h). It was first exhibited at The House of Culture, Stockholm in 1989. The chair was shown as an installation where it was covered with 7 m (23 ft) of red velvet from the wall down over the chair and out onto the floor. That same year, Schlyter entered the international art/design scene when participating in an international furniture design competition in Asahikawa, Japan, where she received an Award Winning Entry for her chair Little h, now executed in wood, moulded from one single piece of birch plywood. "My aim was to create a clean, unbroken line and avoid joints and connecting details...", she said about her work.

Schlyter's design caught the eye of magazine editors and Little h was featured on the cover of several international magazines. Three years later, in 1992, Schlyter was awarded the Utmärkt Svensk Form ("Excellent Swedish Design") award for Little h. The jury's motivation: "Nearest a sitsculpture, which independently and skillfully plays on the modern, nordic bent-wood art. The sovereign curvature gives the impression of stretching the wood's possibilities to the utmost."

== Career and exhibitions ==
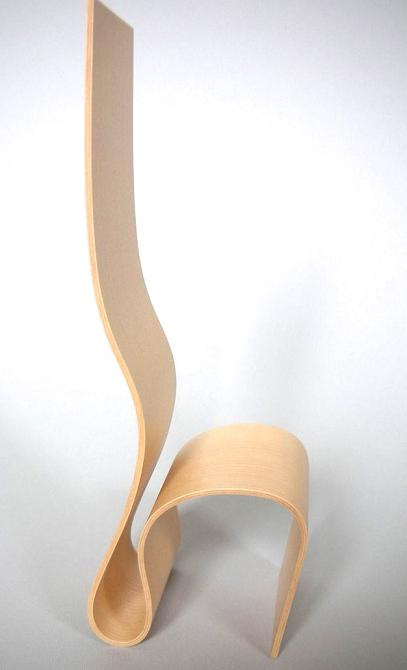
Little h (1989), moulded from a single piece of birch plywood

The chair Little h was soon after accompanied by other furniture pieces, designed in 1990, with similar one-piece moulded plywood constructions; The Lover – an armchair, The Aunt – a dressing table, Tripp, Trapp and Trull – tables, Fido – a tea-trolley, Little m – a child's chair, which all became The h-family. Leo Gullbring wrote, "Caroline Schlyter's distinctly personal and original designs challenge Swedish furniture traditions." A major exhibition of her work entitled Familjen h-son, produced by the Swedish Exhibition Agency was first held at the Lönnströms Konstmuseum, Finland, and later travelled around Swedish museums. An accompanying booklet, was published in conjunction with the exhibition.

Caroline Schlyter's h-family has been exhibited at galleries and museums from Europe to Japan to the United States, including:

- Escales autour du monde, Le Carrousel du Louvre, Paris, France (1993)
- Svensk form på Svenskt Tenn hösten 1995, Svenskt Tenn, Stockholm, Sweden (1995)
- D'una sola peca, Aspectos, Barcelona, Spain (1997)
- Concrete Art and Contemporary Design, Verner Amell Gallery, London, U.K. (2000)
- Annual Group Event, Gallery of Functional Art, Los Angeles (2002)
- Nordic Cool: Hot Women Designers, National Museum of Women in the Arts, Washington, D.C. (2004)
- The International Art+Design Fair 1900–2007, The Park Avenue Armory, New York (2007)
- Design Miami/Basel, Basel, Switzerland (2011).

Her work is featured in several significant collections including the Nationalmuseum, Stockholm, Sweden; Vitra Design Museum, Weil am Rhein, Germany; Design Museum, London, U.K.; and V&A Museum of Childhood Victoria and Albert Museum, London, U.K.

== Works ==
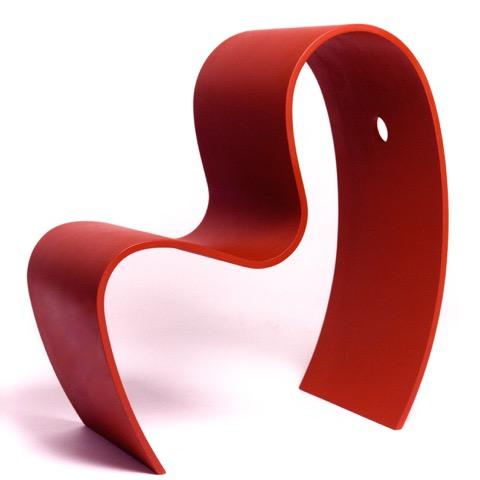
Child's chair Little m (1990), moulded from a single piece of birch plywood, finished in red lacquer

In addition to the h-family, Schlyter has in her artistic production worked with many different materials, investigating void in the architectural space. Examples of her installations and exhibitions include:

- Integrated Spatium (Little h in steel, velvet) Kulturhuset/The House of Culture, Stockholm, (1989)
- Sculpture 1992 (glass, plaster, wood, gouache 2.40 m × 3.60 m (7.9 ft × 11.8 ft)) Konstfack/University College of Arts, Crafts and Design, Stockholm (1992)
- The Ballerina (bronze), Commissioned by Stockholm University (1993)
- Knock on Wood (relief in sheet aluminium), Råbäck Railway Station, Skaraborg (1994)
- Pockory (charcoal on paper enclosed in plastic), Stockholm Smart Show, Stockholm, (1996)
- A paraphrase (mixed media – photograph on canvas, charcoal, graphite 2.50 m × 2.60 m (8.2 ft × 8.5 ft)), Stockholm -European Capital of Culture'98, Stockholm (1998)
- Prolog (ink on paper), The Life Gallery, Stockholm (1999)
- Barhäng (ink, paper, wood 60 cm × 240 cm (24 in × 94 in)), PA & Co, Stockholm (2006)
- Paradiso Inferno Purgatorio (photography/c-prints), Konstnärshuset, Stockholm (2009)
- I miss U (silk-screen), Konstnärshuset, Stockholm (2011)
- 50-50-50 (mixed-media), Konstnärshuset, Stockholm (2012)

In 2015, Schlyter continues to work on a project consisting of sculpture in an architectural video installation, which she first showed at the Royal Institute of Art in Stockholm 2013, in a piece called Intermolecular Forces.
