= Tom Ahlström =

Swedish industrial designer (born 1943)

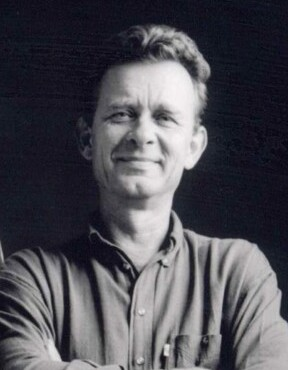
- Born: 30 May 1943; Helsinki, Finland
- Citizenship: Sweden
- Alma mater: Konstfack
- Occupation: Industrial designer
- Relatives: Stig Ahlström

Tom Ahlström (born 30 May 1943) is a Swedish industrial designer. He is the co-founder of A&E Design.

== Biography ==
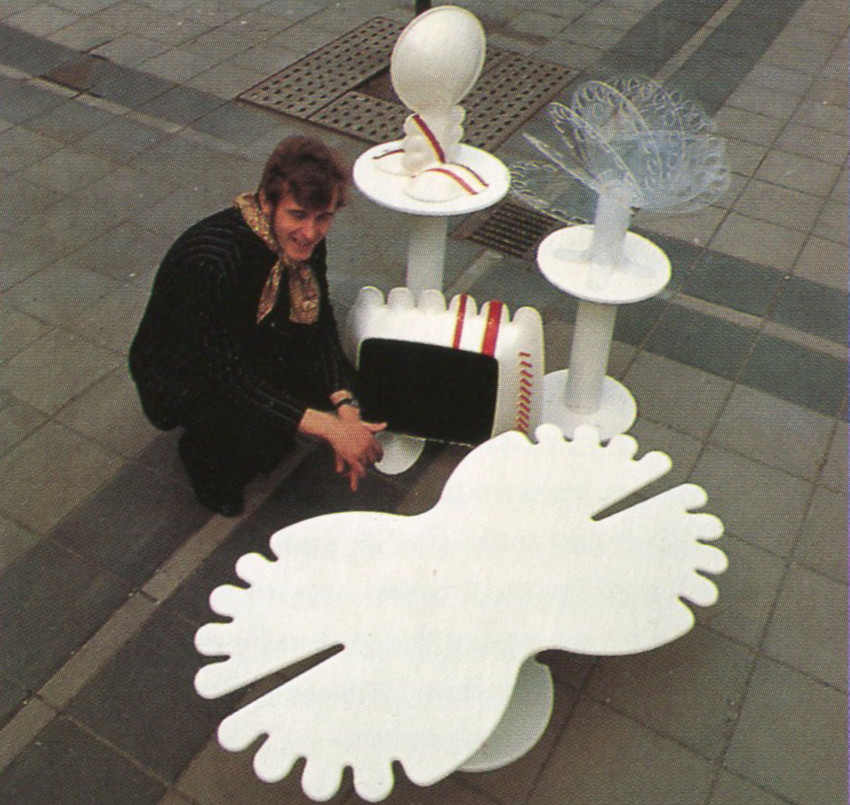
Tom Ahlström with his master's thesis project (1968)

Ahlström and his identical twin brother, Stig, were born on May 30, 1943 in Helsinki, Finland, to a Swedish-speaking Finnish mother and a Swedish father who worked as a businessman in Finland's steel industry. He grew up in Västerås, Sweden, and moved to Stockholm in 1964. He studied crafts and silversmithing at the University College of Arts, Crafts and Design in Stockholm. While a student, he met Hans Ehrich, with whom he subsequently founded A&E Design (Ahlström and Erich) in 1968. The pair designed products such as the 1230 Diskborsten 'dishwashing brush' for Jordan A/S, of which tens of millions of examples were sold; as well as the ticket dispenser and numeric split-flap display for the AB Turn-O-Matic M80 Könummersystem 'queue number system' that "can be found in most supermarkets."

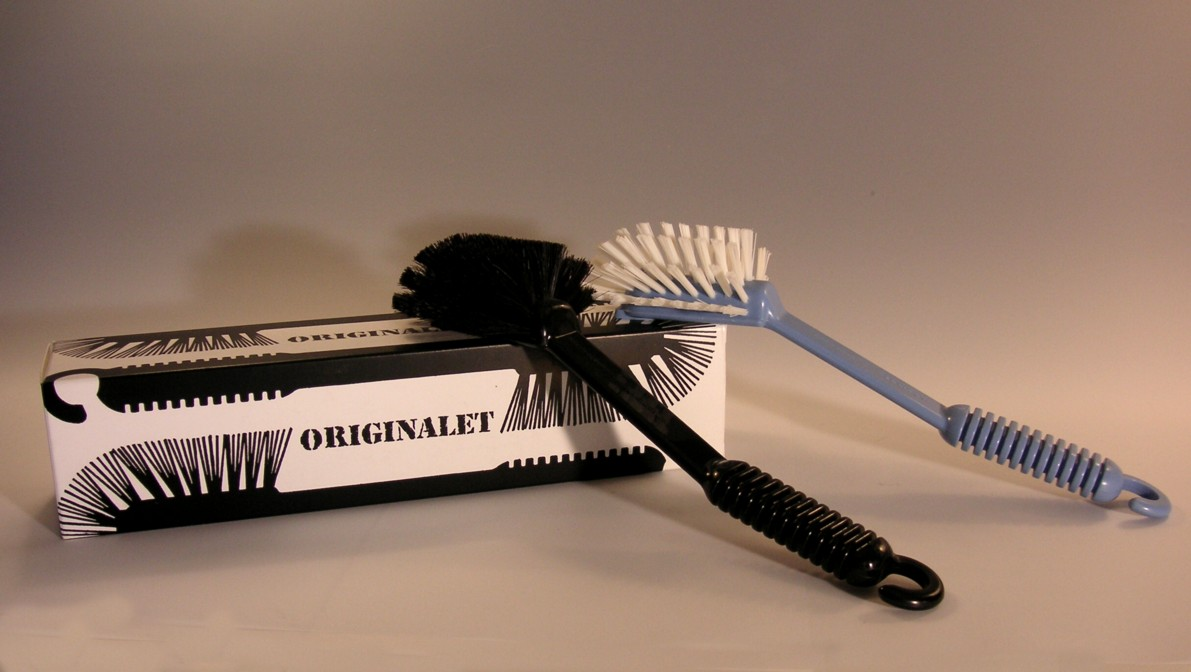
1230 Diskborsten dishwashing brush for Jordan A/S (1974)

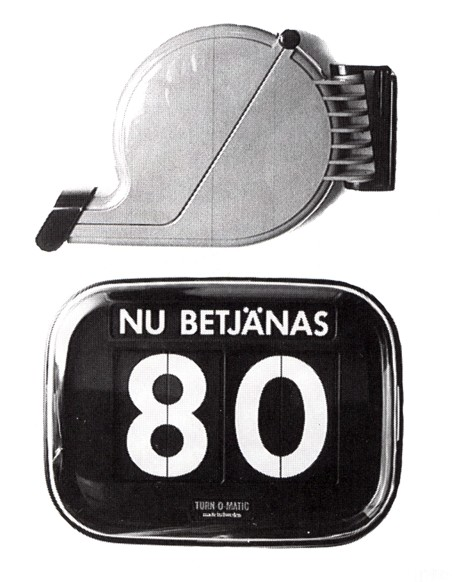
M80 Könummersystem for AB Turn-O-Matic (1974)

== Exhibitions and museum collections ==
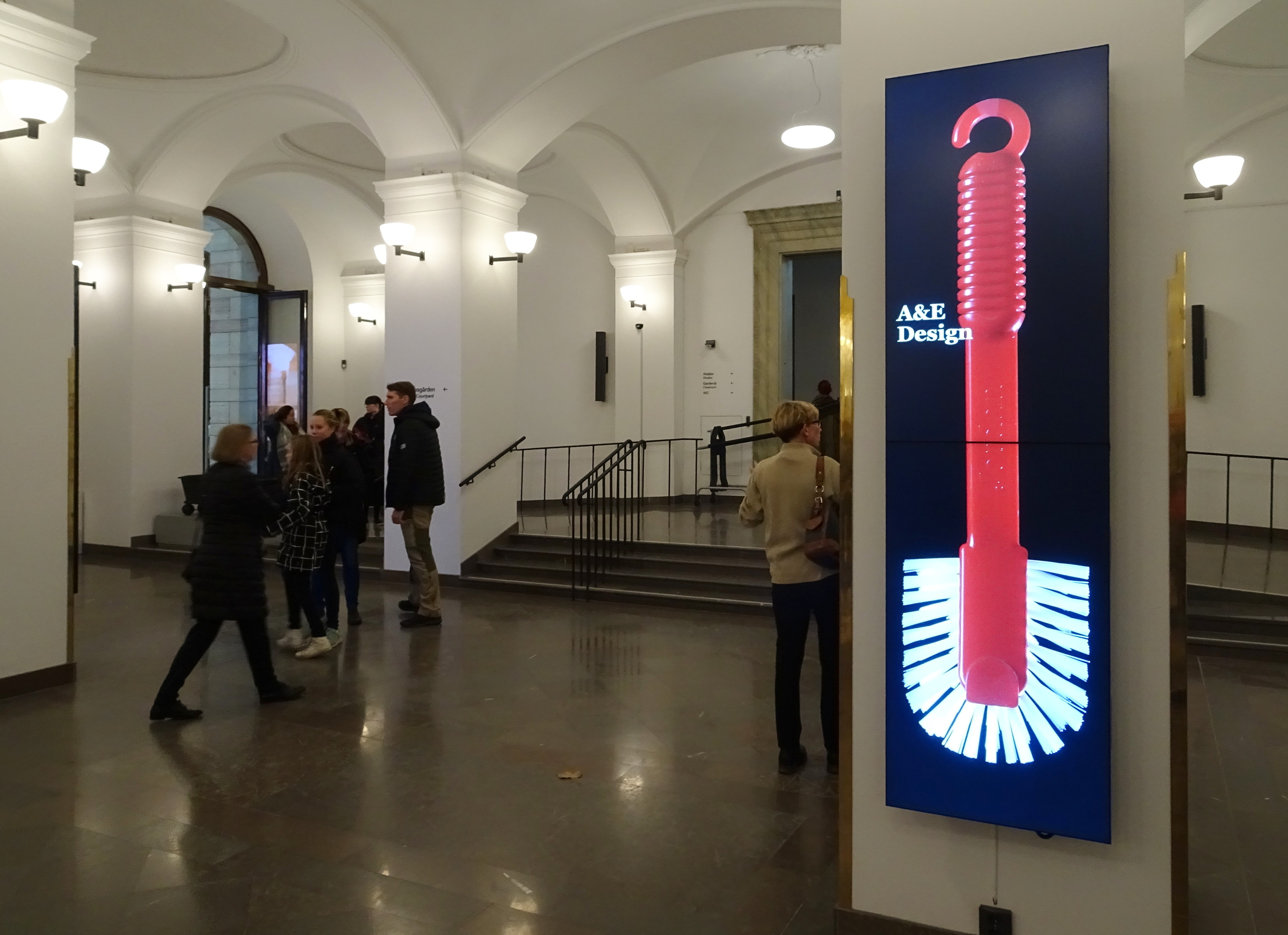
Signage for A&E Design retrospective at the Nationalmuseum, Stockholm (2018–2019)

Designs by Ahlström and Erich are in museums such as the Möbeldesignmuseum, Nasjonalmuseet, Röhsska Museum, Nationalmuseum, the Vitra Design Museum and Pinakothek der Moderne in Germany, and the Museum of Modern Art in New York.

In 2018, the Nationalmuseum in Stockholm staged a retrospective of Ahlström and Ehrich's work. The exhibition included handmade models and prototypes, sketches, drawings, and finished products from the A&E Design archive, which the designers donated to the museum in 2015.

== Publications ==
- Widengren, Gunilla (1994). Tanken och handen: Konstfack 150 år [The Thought and the Hand, Konstfack 150 years] (1st. ed.). Stockholm: Page One Publishing. ISBN 91-71-25-018-2.
- Wickman, Kerstin; Landén, Anders (2018). A & E design: the book. Bromma: Business History Publishing. ISBN 978-91-984266-4-9.
