= Annika von Hausswolff =

Swedish artist (born 1967)

Annika von Hausswolff (born 30 March 1967) is a Swedish visual artist, known for photography and installation art.

She studied at Sven Winquists School of Photography in Gothenburg, Sweden from 1987 to 1989; Konstfack in Stockholm from 1991 to 1994 and the Royal Institute of Art in Stockholm from 1995 to 1996.

Von Hausswolff received a ten-year grant from the Swedish Arts Grants Committee in 2002. She has had solo shows at the National Gallery of Denmark, Copenhagen, Denmark; Konsthallen-Bohusläns Museum, Uddevalla, Sweden; Norrköpings Konstmuseum, Norrköping, Sweden; and the Baltic Art Center, Visby, Sweden. She was awarded a solo show at the Venice Biennale in 1999.
