= Konstfack =

Art school in Stockholm, Sweden

Konstfack University of Arts, Crafts and Design
- Konstfack
- Motto: Insigt och flit
- Motto in English: "Insight and diligence"
- Type: Public
- Established: 1844; 182 years ago
- Vice-Chancellor: Anna Valtonen
- Faculty: 111 (2022)
- Administrative staff: 67 (2022)
- Students: 872 (2020)
- Doctoral students: 12 (2022)
- Location: Stockholm, Sweden; 59°17′55″N 17°59′45″E
- Campus: Urban
- Website: konstfack.se

Konstfack University of Arts, Crafts and Design, is a university for higher education in the area of art, crafts and design in Stockholm, Sweden.

== History ==
Konstfack has had several different names since it was founded in 1844 by the ethnologist and artist Nils Månsson Mandelgren as a part-time art school for artisans, under the name Söndags-Rit-skola för Handtverkare ("Sunday Drawing School for Artisans"). The school was taken over by Svenska Slöjdföreningen (today known as Svensk Form) the next year and renamed Svenska Slöjdföreningens skola.

In 1857, the first two female students (Sofi Granberg and Matilda Andersson) were accepted, and the following year female students officially were invited to apply.

It became a state school and was renamed Slöjdskolan i Stockholm (Handicraft School in Stockholm) in 1859; and in the context of a thorough reorganisation, where the school was divided into four departments in 1879, to Tekniska skolan (The Technical School). From 1945 it was known as Konstfackskolan (The school of art departments), when the institution was divided into the departments devoted to distinct disciplines that remain largely today: Textile, Decorative art, Sculpture, Ceramics, Furniture and Interior Design, Metal and Advertising and Printing. The school also obtained official status and had a two-year day school and a three-year arts and craft evening school. To this was added a two-year higher Arts and Crafts school and a three-year Art Teacher institute. It was given the status of a högskola ("university college") in 1978. From 1993 it was called Konstfack, the short form of the full name, formerly used colloquially.

Long located on Norrmalm, between Klara kyrka and Hötorget, the school was in 1959 moved to a new building on Valhallavägen with well-equipped workshops, designed by architects Gösta Åberg and Tage Hertzell. In 2004 it once again moved, to the former headquarters of LM Ericsson at Telefonplan in South Stockholm. The 20,300-square metre interior of the old factory building was redesigned by architects including Gert Wingårdh.

== Education ==
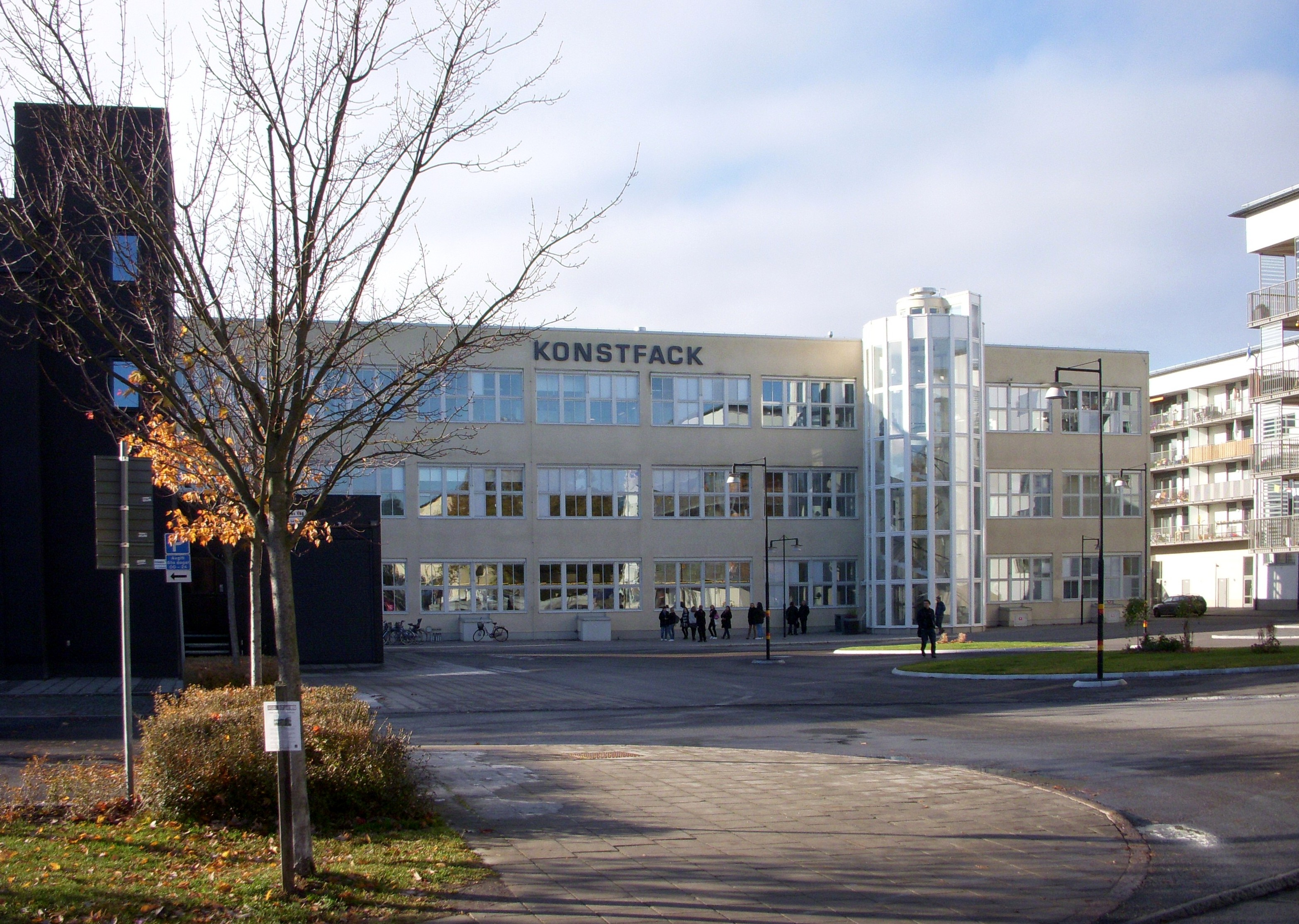
Konstfack at Telefonplan, Stockholm, in 2010.

Following the standards of the Bologna process, Konstfack offers bachelor's degree programmes (3 years, 180 ECTS credits, Bachelor of Fine Arts), master's degree programmes (2 years, 120 ECTS credits, Master of Fine Arts), and a third-cycle programme (4 years, 240 ECTS, Doctor of Philosophy, PhD and 2 years, 120 ECTS, Licentiate degree).

There are also Art Education programmes (teacher programmes, 4/5 years and 5 years). The 2-year Animation education existed between 1996 and 2005; and was located in Eksjö.

There are seven Bachelor's Programmes:

- Ceramics and Glass
- Jewellery and Corpus
- Fine Art
- Graphic Design and Illustration
- Industrial Design
- Interior Architecture and Furniture Design
- Textiles

The Undergraduate Programmes are conducted in Swedish.

There are five Master's Programmes:

- Craft (Ceramics and Glass / Jewellery and Corpus / Textiles)
- Design Echologies
- Fine Art
- Spatial Design
- Visual Communication

One goal of Konstfack's two-year Graduate Programmes is to attract both Swedish and international students, and the education is held mainly in English.

Konstfack also offers doctoral level education:

- Artistic Practice in Visual, Applied and Spatial Arts

=== Professional courses ===
Konstfack offers courses for professionals, for example CuratorLab and Research Lab.

=== Departments ===
Konstfack has four departments:

- Craft
- Design, Interior architecture and Visual communications
- Fine Art
- Department of Visual Arts and Sloyd Education

=== Examinations and The Degree Exhibition ===
The third year of the bachelor's programme and the second year of the master's includes a degree project, ten weeks at BFA-level and twenty at MFA-level, ending with a public examination and, if the student passes the examination, an exhibition for all graduating students: the Degree Exhibition (Vårutställningen). The annual exhibition usually takes place at Konstfack during two weeks in May, with around 180 exhibiting students, and attracts thousands of visitors.
Link to the official website for the Spring Exhibition 2023.

== Notable alumni ==
A selection of some distinguished former students at the different departments at Konstfack (art or designer groups referred to by their collective names):

=== Fine arts ===
- Hilma af Klint (1862–1944)
- Stig Lindberg (1916–1982) textile and ceramic designer,
- Annika von Hausswolff (born 1967)
- Carl Milles (1875–1955)
- Johanna Billing (born 1973)
- Miriam Bäckström (born 1967)
- Caroline Schlyter (born 1961)
- Mamma Andersson (born 1962)
- Annie Bergman (1889–1987)
- Elsa Björkman-Goldschmidt (1888–1982),
- Tim Goulding (born 1945), Irish painter
- Siri Derkert (1888–1973)
- Elsa Danson Wåghals (1885–1977)

==== Ceramics and glass ====
- Bertil Vallien (born 1938)
- Per B. Sundberg
- Zandra Ahl
- Christian-Pontus Andersson (born 1977)

=== Design ===
==== Graphic design and illustration ====
- Carl Johan De Geer (artist and designer)
- Lasse Åberg (filmmaker)
- Brita Granström (artist and illustrator)
- Lars Hall (advertising)
- Tuulikki Pietilä (artist)
- Stina Wirsén (illustrator)
- Tove Jansson (artist and illustrator)
- Vivi Sylwan (drawing instructor, textile historian and textile curator)

==== Interior architecture and furniture design ====
- Claesson Koivisto Rune
- Greta Magnusson-Grossman

==== Industrial design ====
- A & E Design
- Katja Pettersson
- Veryday (formerly Ergonomidesign)

==== Metal design ====
- Erik Fleming (1894–1954), silversmith and head teacher for metal arts from 1947 until 1954
- Vivianna Torun Bülow-Hübe (1927–2004), jewelry designer

==== Textiles ====
- Astrid Sampe
- Hans Krondahl
- Helena Hernmarck

=== Art education ===
- Cecilia Torudd (cartoonist)
- Elsa Beskow (writer and illustrator of children's books)
- Jockum Nordström (artist)

== See also ==
- Valand School of Fine Arts
- Royal University College of Fine Arts, Stockholm
