= Zandra Ahl =

Swedish designer, artist, and author

- Born: 1975 (age 50–51); Växjö, Sweden
- Occupations: Designer, author

Zandra Ahl (born 1975) is a Swedish designer, artist, and author.

== Biography ==
Ahl graduated from Konstfack university in 1999. She subsequently became a Professor of glass and ceramics at Konstfack, before becoming the rector of Beckmans College of Design in September 2016. She is the author of the books Fult och snyggt (Ugly and Beautiful) in 1998 and, Svensk smak: myter om den moderna formen (Swedish Taste: The Myth of Modern Design) in 2001, which was co-authored with Emma Ohlson. Her writing caused controversy through their criticism of Swedish design as "banal", "white", and "austere" and its description of Sweden's late-20th century "less is more" aesthetic as a kind of "anorexia-aethetics".

Ahl's works are noted for their humanistic form, using rosettes, plastic rings, and quotes from comic books. Her works are featured in the collections of the Nationalmuseum in Stockholm, Gothenburg's Röhsska Museum, and the Småland Glass Museum.

In April 2008 the showing of a film, in which Ahl had included criticism of the Nationalmuseum, was withdrawn from display at the Nationalmuseum. Ahl described this as "censorship". The management of the Nationalmuseum described this as being necessary to avoid "a strong strain on our employees".
