= Jockum Nordström =

Swedish artist (born 1963)

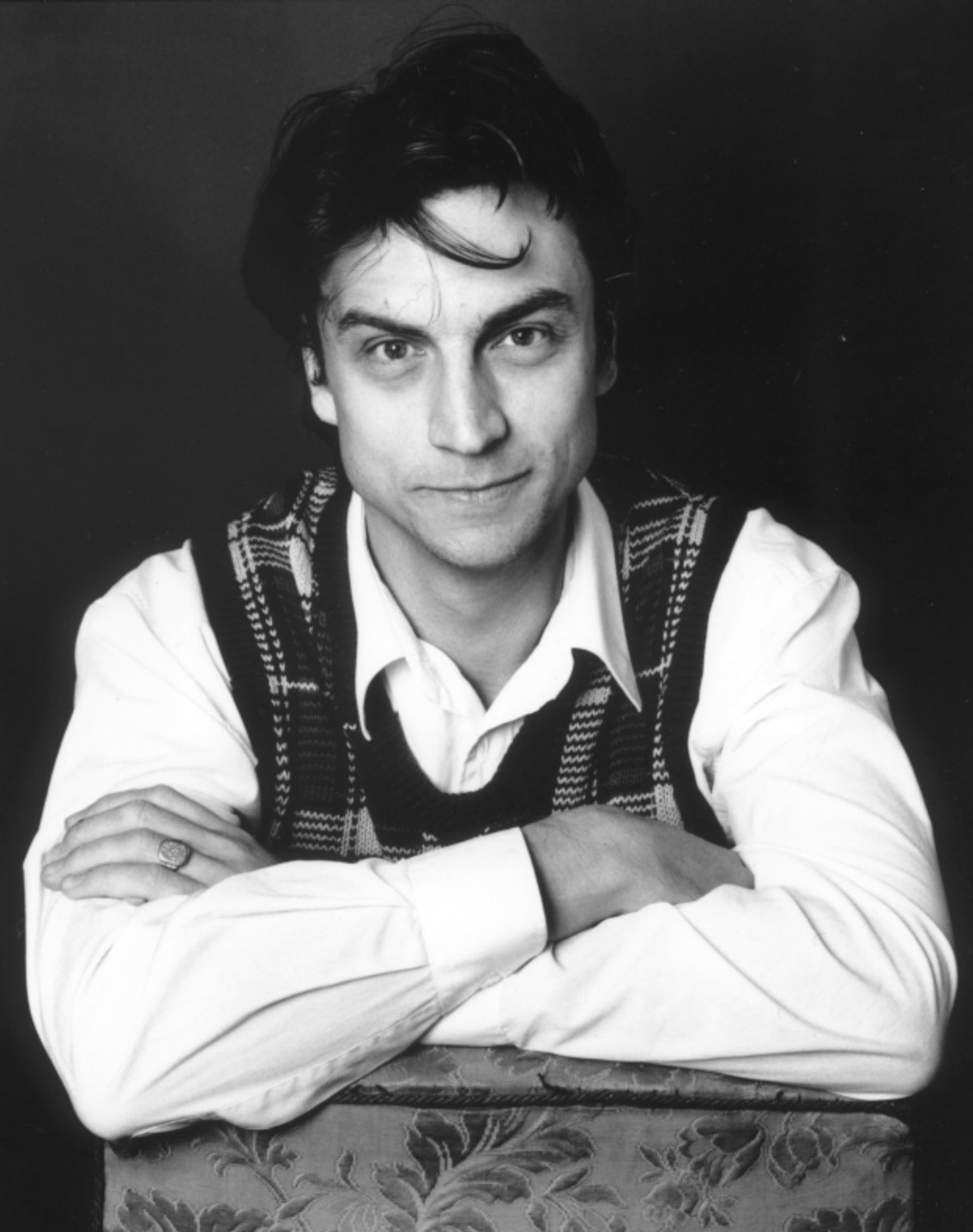
Jockum Nordström

Jockum Nordström (born 1963) is a Swedish artist, best known for his vivid collages, but also for his drawings, paintings and work as an illustrator.

== Biography ==
Jockum Nordström was born on December 19, 1963, in Stockholm, Sweden in a family with two brothers and one sister. His father Gert Z Nordström was a professor of art education at Konstfack, University College of Art, Crafts and Design, the same school and department from where Jockum graduated in 1988. Nordström’s national popularity increased with the series of children’s books about the character Sailor and his dog Pekka, and while working as an illustrator at the Stockholm newspaper Dagens Nyheter 1997-1999. Nordström has also designed record sleeves for the rock band Caesars. His first show in the United States was at Jack Hanley Gallery in San Francisco 1999. In 2000 his reputation increased rapidly when some of Nordström’s drawings were exhibited at Liste in Basel and quickly were sold out, among others to the Museum of Modern Art (MoMA) in New York. He joined David Zwirner Gallery in New York City in shortly after.

Nordström met his wife, the Swedish painter Karin Mamma Andersson, while working at a summer camp. They live in the Stockholm suburb Tallkrogen and have two sons.

== Works ==
Nordström is known for his collages, paintings, drawings and sculptures that knit together references to folk art and outsider art, jazz, surrealist collage, furniture and architectural design, human sexual habits and maritime lore. He has also written children's books and designed album covers. His work is in the public collections of the Museum of Modern Art in New York, the Moderna Museet and Magasin 3 in Stockholm, and the Gothenburg Art Museum.

== Catalogues ==
2007 Los Angeles, California. Roberts & Tilton. Other Scenes, 2007. Text by Aaron Rose.
2003 Galleri Magnus Karlsson. Jockum Nordström: Between the table and the Legs /Works 2000-2002, Stockholm 2003.

== Animated films ==
1997 "In his Loneliness" (10 min)
1994 "The Sunday Orchestra" (5 min)

== Exhibitions ==
Selected solo exhibitions

- Jockum Nordström: Why is Everything a Rag, Contemporary Arts Center New Orleans, New Orleans, 2018
- Jockum Nordström: Rymden Tystar Ljudet Zeno X Gallery, Antwerp, Belgium, 2017
- Jockum Nordström: När ingen vandrar vägen fram, då vandrar vägen själv sitt dam, Galleri Magnus Karlsson, Stockholm, Sweden, 2016
- Jockum Nordström: For the insects and the hounds, David Zwirner, London, 2014
- Jockum Nordström: All I Have Learned and Forgotten Again, LaM (Lille métropole musée d'art moderne, d'art contemporain et d'art brut), Villeneuve d'Ascq, France, 2013.
