= Lars Hall (art director) =

Lars Christer Hall (1 December 1938 – 5 April 2018) was a Swedish advertiser and art director.

== Biography ==
It was an art teacher in primary school that suggested that Lars Hall should apply to Konstfackskolan (now called Konstfack, University College of Arts, Crafts and Design) in Stockholm. He started at age 15, worked as a freelance during his studies, and graduated in 1960.

After his studies, Hall worked for a number of agencies, and also at the Stockholm newspaper Dagens Nyheter. While working for Arbman, at that time a large advertising agency in Sweden, he met copywriter Jan Cederquist, with whom he started Hall & Cederquist in 1973.

Hall & Cederquist's role model was New York agency DDB (Doyle, Dane & Bernbach), with their style of advertising, placing creativity before commerce. After having won most national awards available, Hall & Cederquist became one of the first agencies to receive Platinaägget in 1978, the highest award in Swedish advertising.

In 1989, Hall & Cederquist was bought by American Young & Rubicam, creating the largest ad agency in Sweden, and Hall quit in the mid-1990s.

In 1997, he started Lars Hall AB, working in the broad fields of advertising, corporate identities, packaging design, interior design, and book design. In 2009, Hall had to dismiss most employees due to decreasing clients and commissions.

Hall’s interest in photography led him and Cederquist to start the art photography gallery Camera Obscura, located in Gamla stan in Stockholm. The gallery held exhibitions of among others Christer Strömholm, Diane Arbus, and Irving Penn. Hall was also known for having one of Sweden's most extensive photo collections.
