= Katja Pettersson =

Swedish designer

- Occupation: Designer

Katja Pettersson is a Swedish designer who has worked and studied within a broad spectrum of design.

== Biography ==
Before studying industrial design at the University College of Arts, Crafts and Design (Konstfack) she worked in theatres and with textiles. In 2003, during her studies, she founded the design group FRONT together with three other students, Sofia Lagerkvist, Charlotte von der Lancken and Anna Lindgren. FRONT has exhibited work at the Museum of Modern Art in New York, the Victoria and Albert Museum and Design Museum in London, and the Nationalmuseum in Stockholm; they were awarded the Designer of the Future prize at Art Basel Miami in 2007.

In 2009, she left FRONT to move closer to the furniture industry, and created The Fifty Fifty Projects with industrial designer Anders Landström. Since then she has been working as an independent designer, investigating design projects which combine design with a social commitment and an interest in the working conditions and production conditions of designers: The Fifty Fifty Projects operates on a business model which shares profits 50/50 between designers and the company.

Pettersson is currently a Senior Lecturer in Industrial design at Konstfack. She previously had a similar position at Beckmans College of Design in Stockholm, Sweden.
