= Mamma Andersson =

Swedish contemporary artist

Karin Mamma Andersson
- Born: Anna Karin Andersson; 1962 (age 63–64); Luleå, Sweden
- Known for: visual art, contemporary art

Mamma Andersson (born 1962) is a Swedish contemporary artist. She is based in Stockholm and is married to artist Jockum Nordström.

== Biography ==
Born Anna Karin Andersson, she drew and painted from an early age without any family members being interested in art. Andersson's birthplace and childhood home of Luleå is in North Sweden, near the Polar circle.

She studied at the Royal Institute of Art in Stockholm and her nickname Mamma ("Mother") was added at that time to differentiate herself from another student with the same name. She was a mother during her time at art school and has two sons with artist Jockum Nordström.

She started by painting landscapes because that was what she saw daily as she pushed her kids around in the pram. She worked as a guard at Moderna Museet in Stockholm and was influenced by work of Dick Bengtsson. To learn to paint she found she had to engross herself in others work and cites John-Erik Franzén, Enno Hallek and her "greatest teacher" Dick Bengtsson. (from Moderna Museet 2007. Mamma Andersson, Steidl)

== Work ==
Mamma Andersson's paintings depict domestic interiors, lush landscapes, and genre scenes. Shaped by her upbringing amidst forests and art books, her work is imbued with beguiling narrative zest and frequent references to the stage and everyday settings as well as to works by other artists. Both familiar and mysterious, most of Andersson's works include images of recognizable paintings by other artists as peculiarly placed accessories.

== Exhibitions ==
Moderna Museet in Stockholm hosted a major solo exhibition of the artist's work in 2007, curated by Ann-Sofi Noring. The exhibition traveled to Helsingin Taidehalli, Helsinki, and Camden Arts Centre, London. The exhibition catalogue includes essays by Ann-Sofi Noring, Kim Levin and Midori Matsui, poems by Thomas Tidholm and a conversation between Karin Mamma Andersson and the author and playwright Lars Norén.

The artist's prints were exhibited at Crown Point Press, San Francisco in 2009. In 2010, Andersson exhibited at Aspen Art Museum, Colorado. Her work was the subject of a solo exhibition at Museum Haus Esters in Krefeld, Germany in 2011. She had three solo exhibitions at David Zwirner Gallery in New York City: Room Under the Influence (2006), Who is sleeping on my pillow (2010), and Behind the Curtain (2015).

Her solo exhibition Memory Banks opened in October 2018 at The Contemporary Arts Center (CAC), Cincinnati, Ohio.

== Collections ==
Mamma Andersson's work is included in the following collections:

- National Gallery of Art, Washington, DC
- Museum of Contemporary Art, Los Angeles, Los Angeles, California
- The Broad Art Foundation, Santa Monica, Los Angeles, California
- Hammer Museum, Los Angeles
- Dallas Museum of Art, Dallas, Texas
- Museum of Modern Art (MoMA), New York City
- Buffalo AKG Art Museum, Buffalo, New York
- Apoteket AB, Stockholm, Sweden
- Bonnier Dahlins Stiftelse, Stockholm, Sweden
- City of Stockholm, Stockholm, Sweden
- Folkets Hus och Parker, Stockholm, Sweden
- Göteborgs Konstmuseum, Gothenburg, Sweden
- Kultur i Länet, Uppsala, Sweden
- Luleå Kommun, Luleå, Sweden
- Magasin 3 Stockholm Konsthall
- Malmö Konstmuseum, Sweden
- Moderna Museet, Stockholm, Sweden
- National Public Art Council, Stockholm, Sweden
- Västerås Konstmuseum, Västerås, Sweden
- Louisiana Museum of Modern Art, Humlebæk, Denmark
