= A&E Design =

Swedish design company founded in 1968

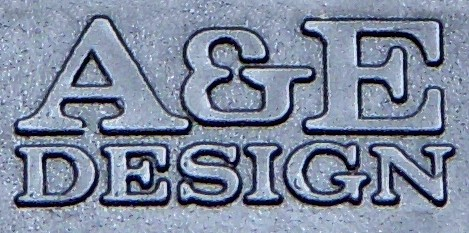

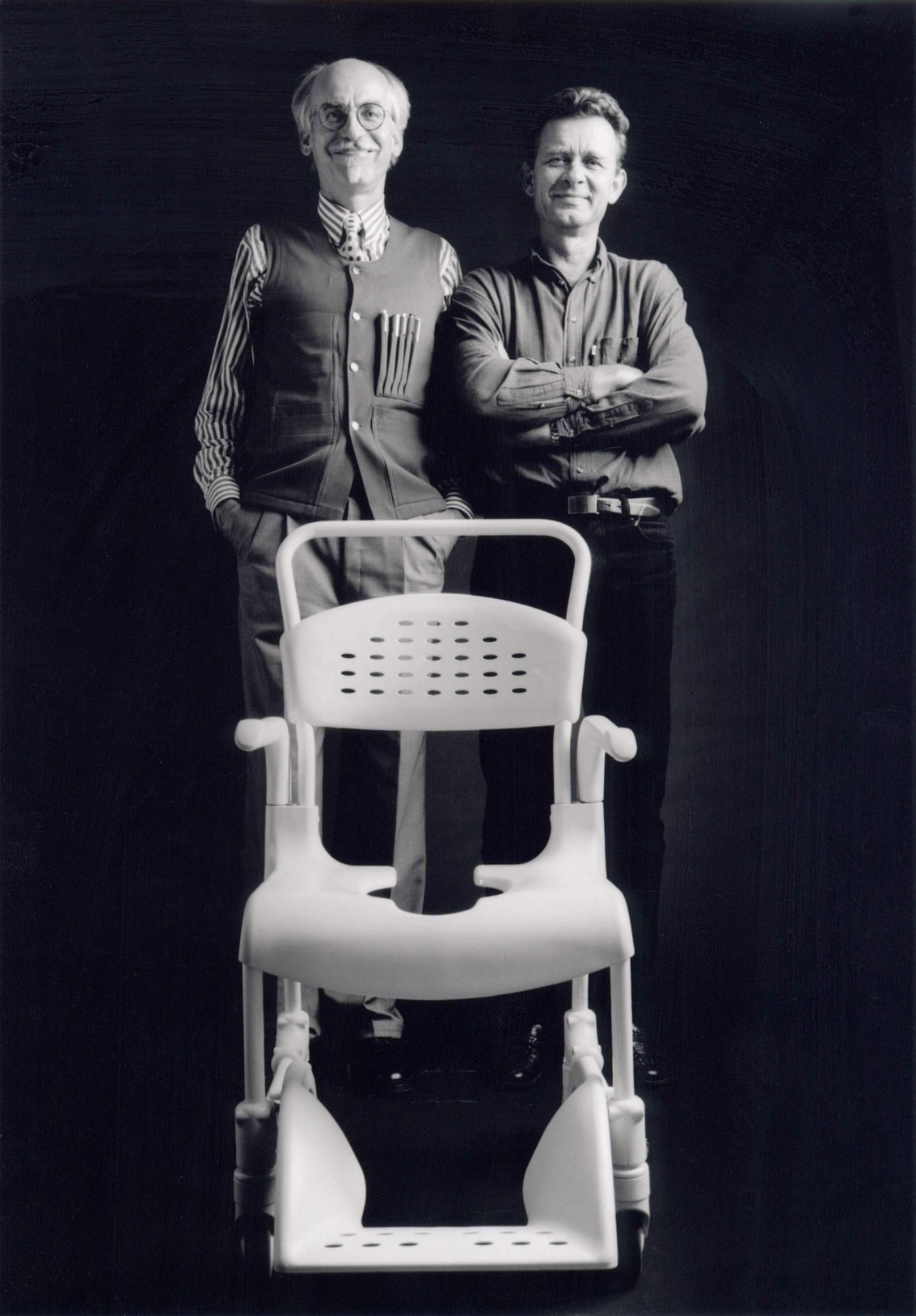
- Hans Ehrich and Tom Ahlström
- Founded: 1968
- Founder: Tom Ahlström and Hans Ehrich (A&E)

A&E Design is a Swedish design company.

== History ==
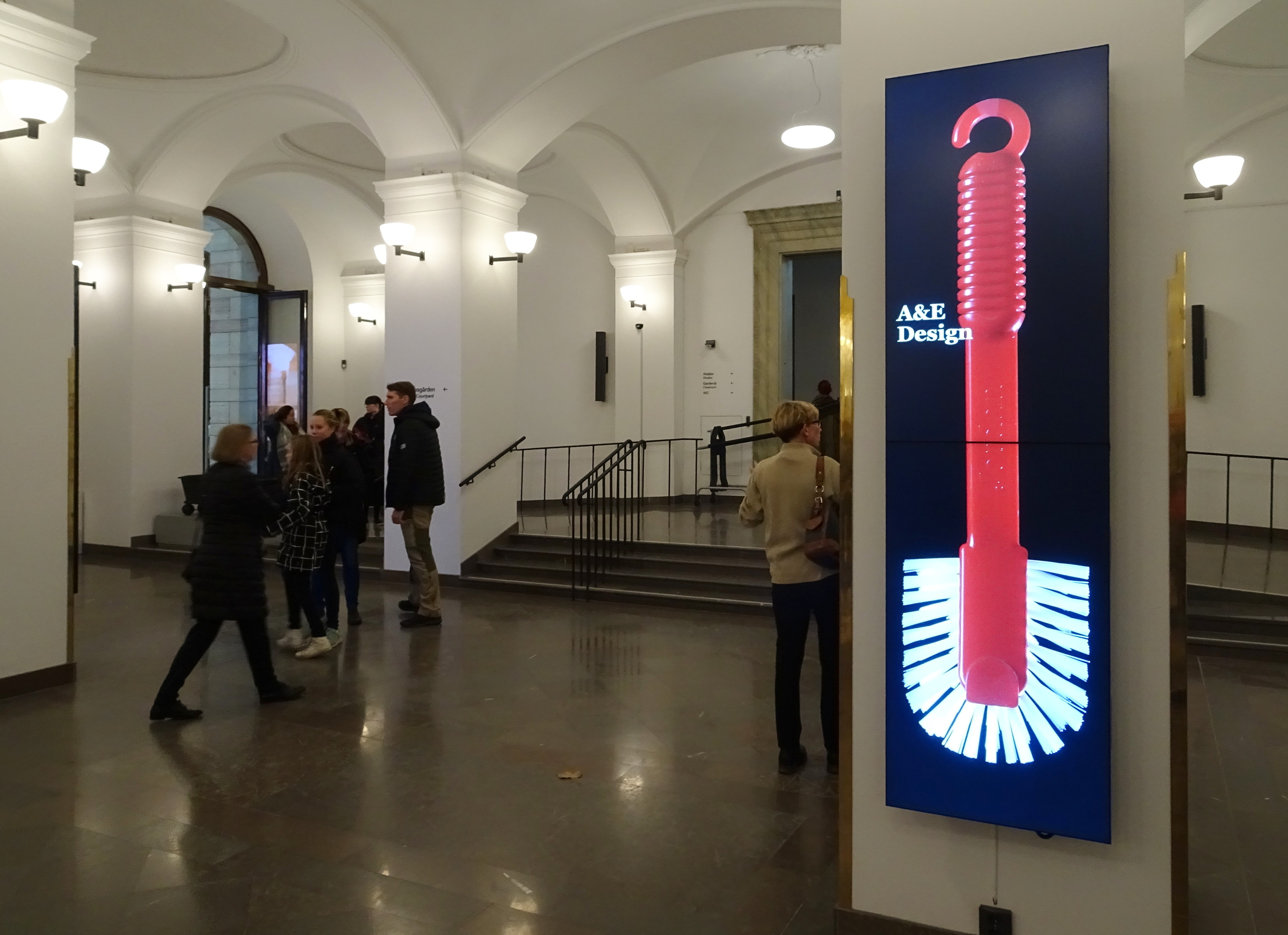
Sinage for A&E Design exhibition, Nationalmuseum, Stockholm (2018)

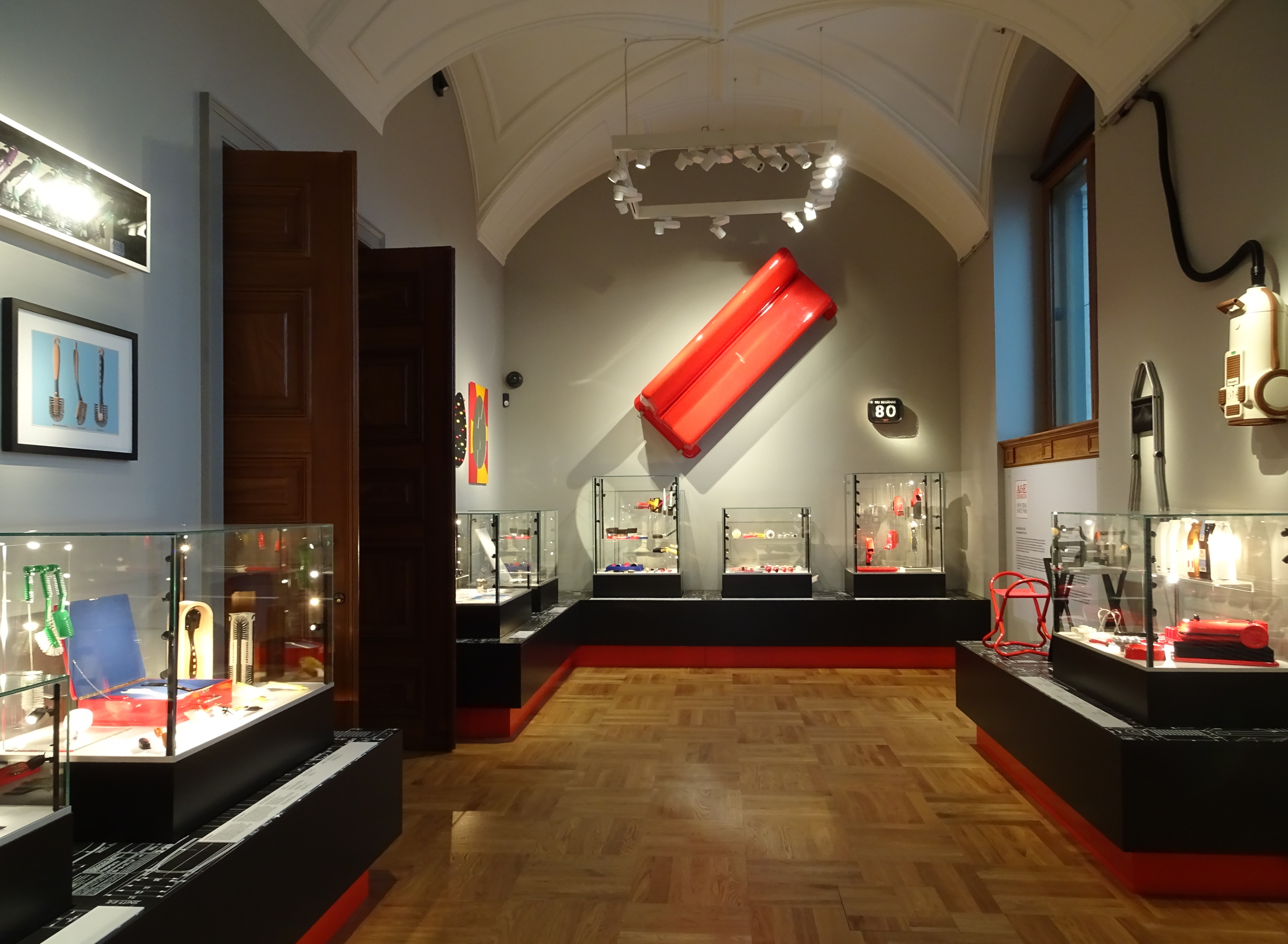
Gallery view, A&E Design exhibition

A & E Design focuses on daily products, It is known for practical dishwashing brushes (for Norwegian Jordan, selling more than sixty million units), queue-ticket dispensers (for Turn-O-Matic), and a folding stool for museums – Stockholm II.

Following the disability rights movement in the 1970s, A&E Design made many designs for disabled people. Hans Ehrich also designed an electric car in the 1960s.

A & E Design received design awards, including 14 Excellent Swedish Design Awards and 5 Red Dot Design Awards, of which three were for Highest Design Quality. Among their clients are Alessi, C&B Italia, Colgate, Design House Stockholm, Lammhults, Scandinavian Airlines System, Siemens, and Zanotta.

== Gallery ==
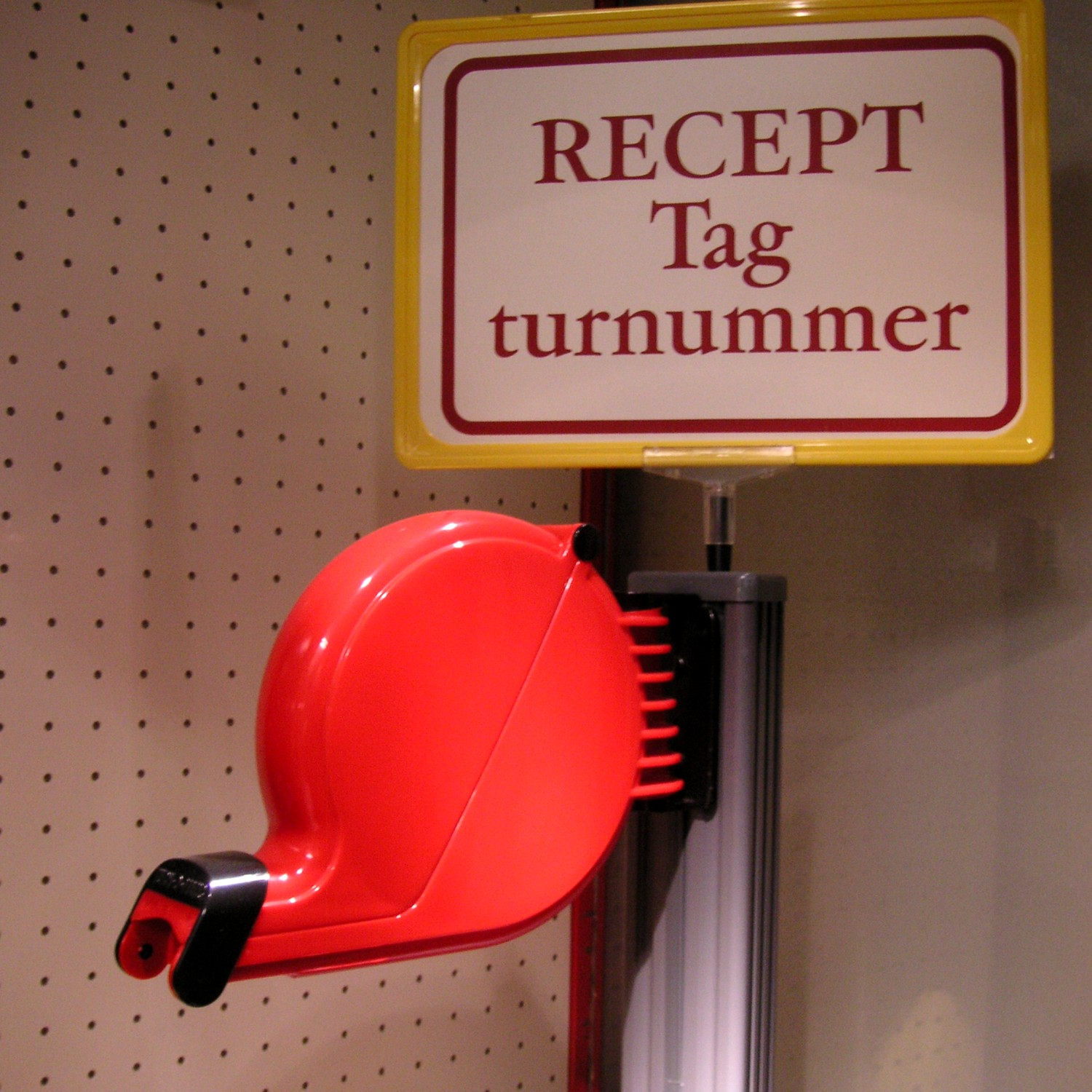
Turn-O-Matic 1974

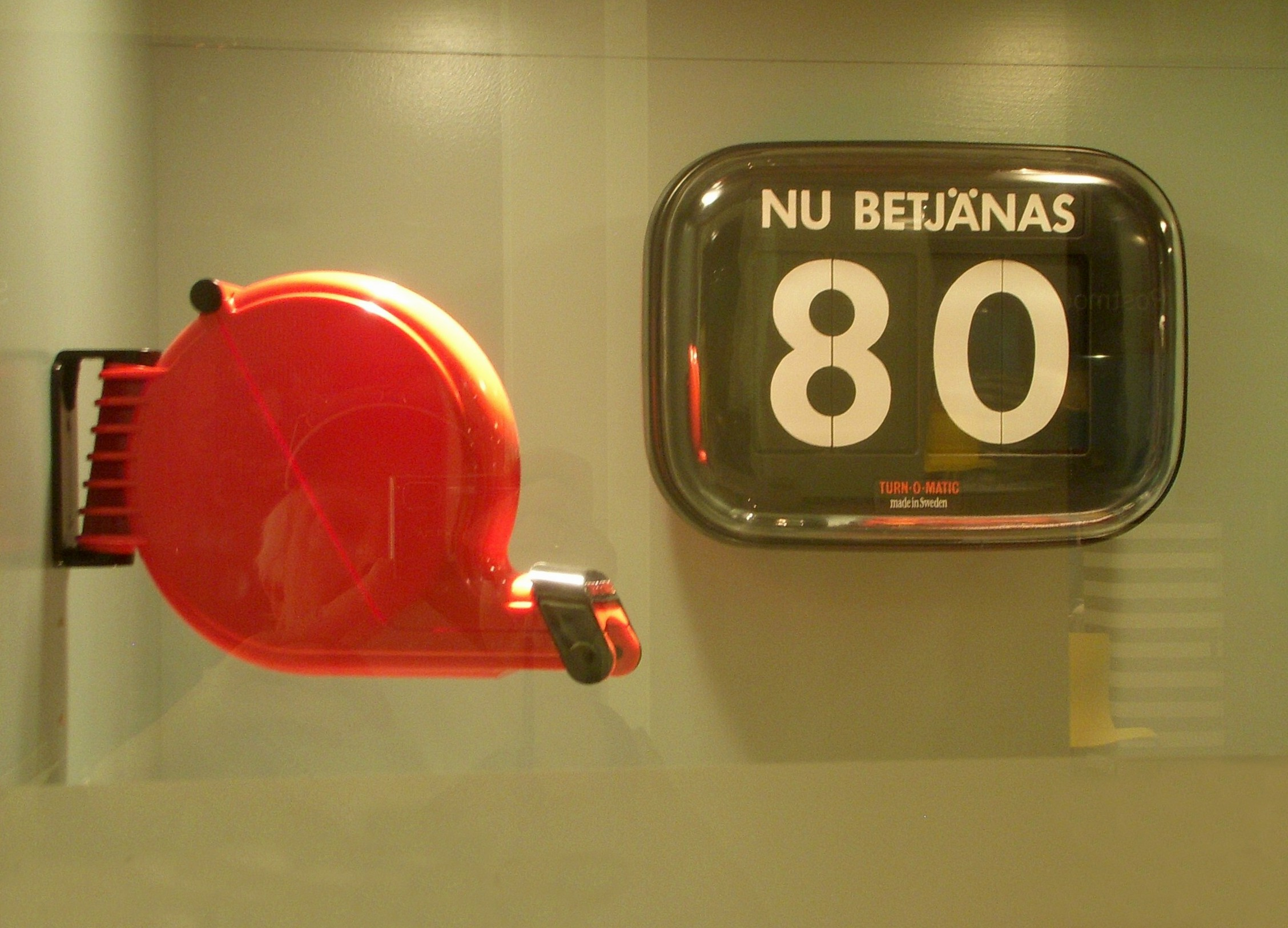
Turn-O-Matic

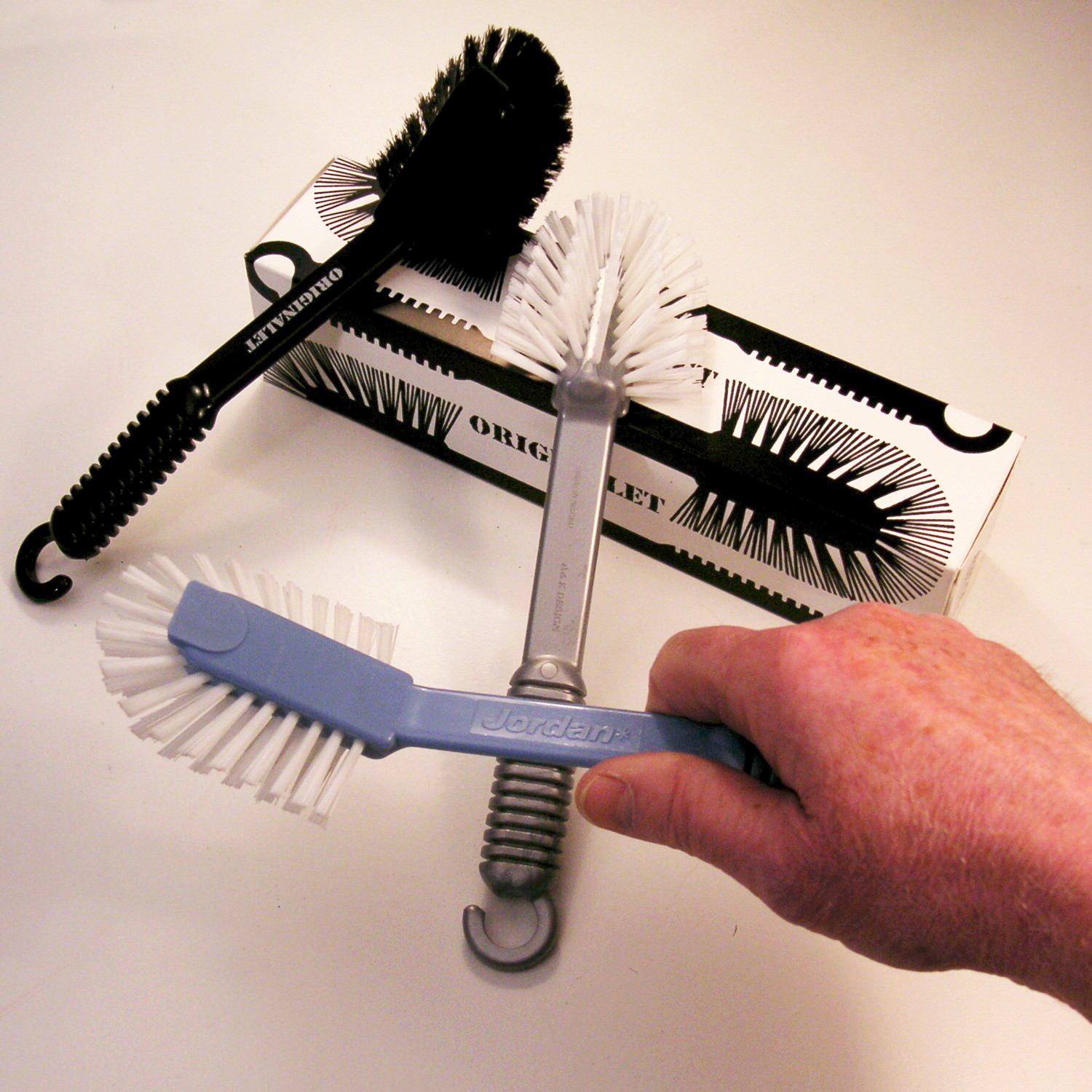
Dishwashing brush 1974

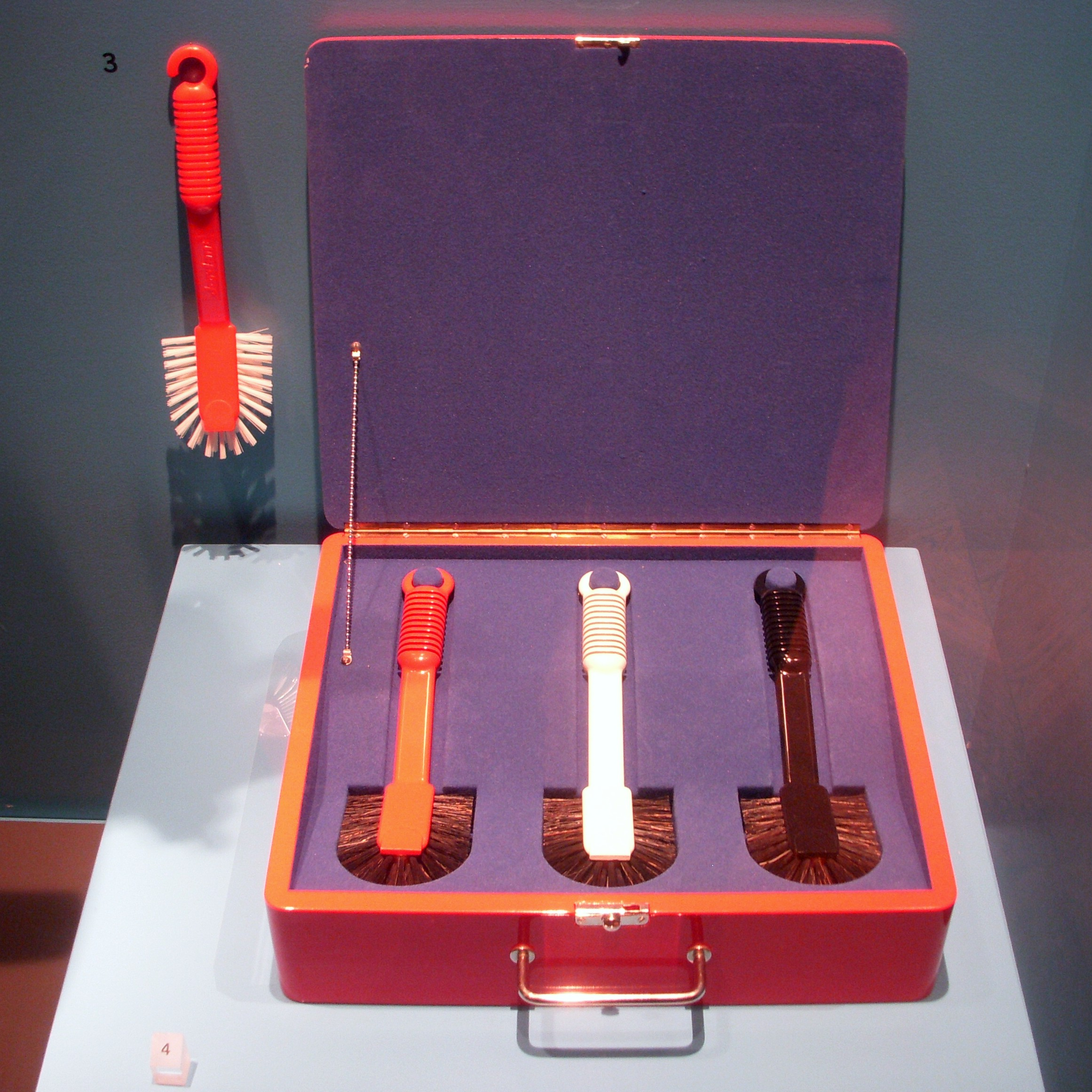
Dishwashing brush at Nationalmuseum

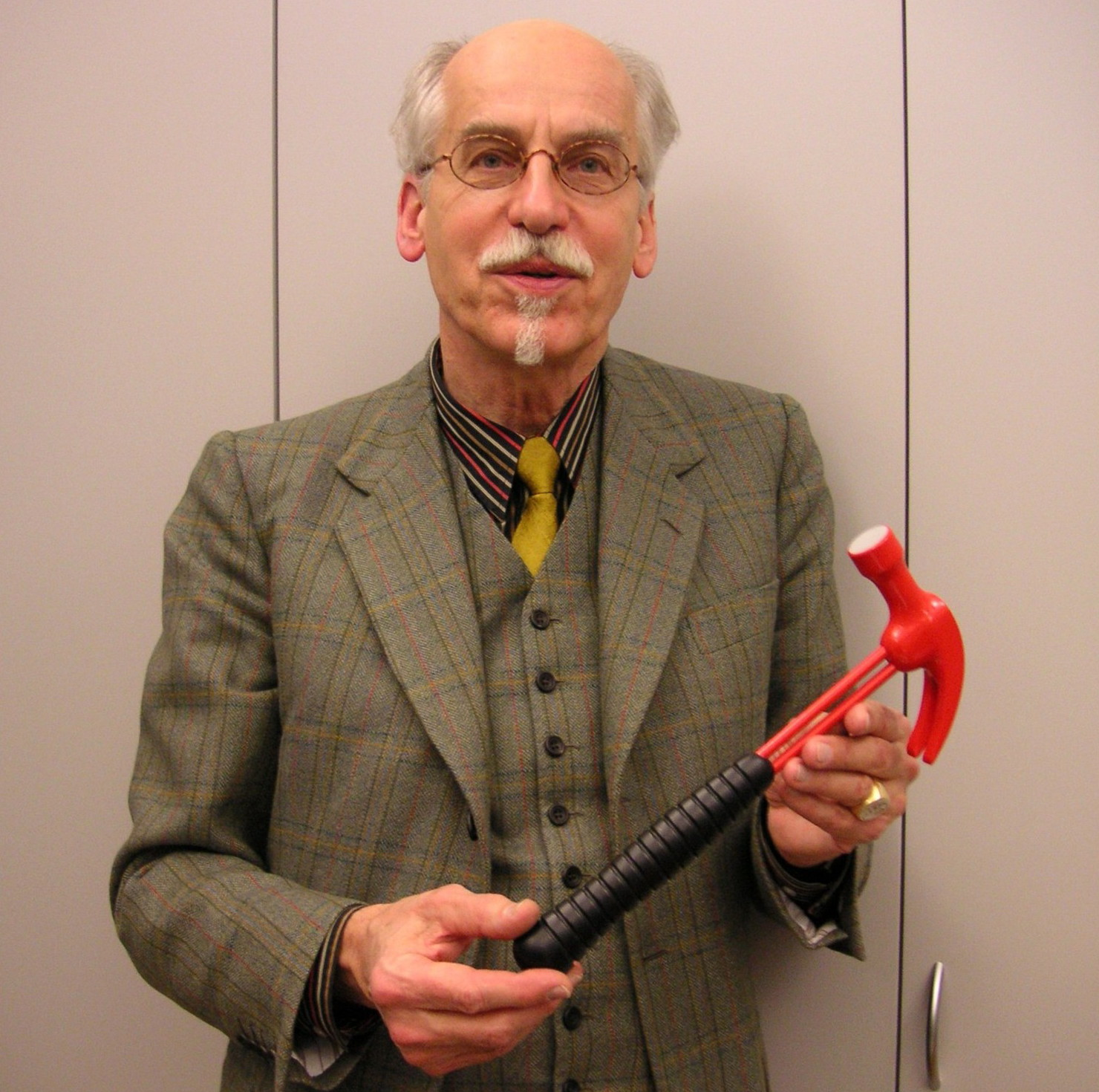
Hans Ehrich 2008

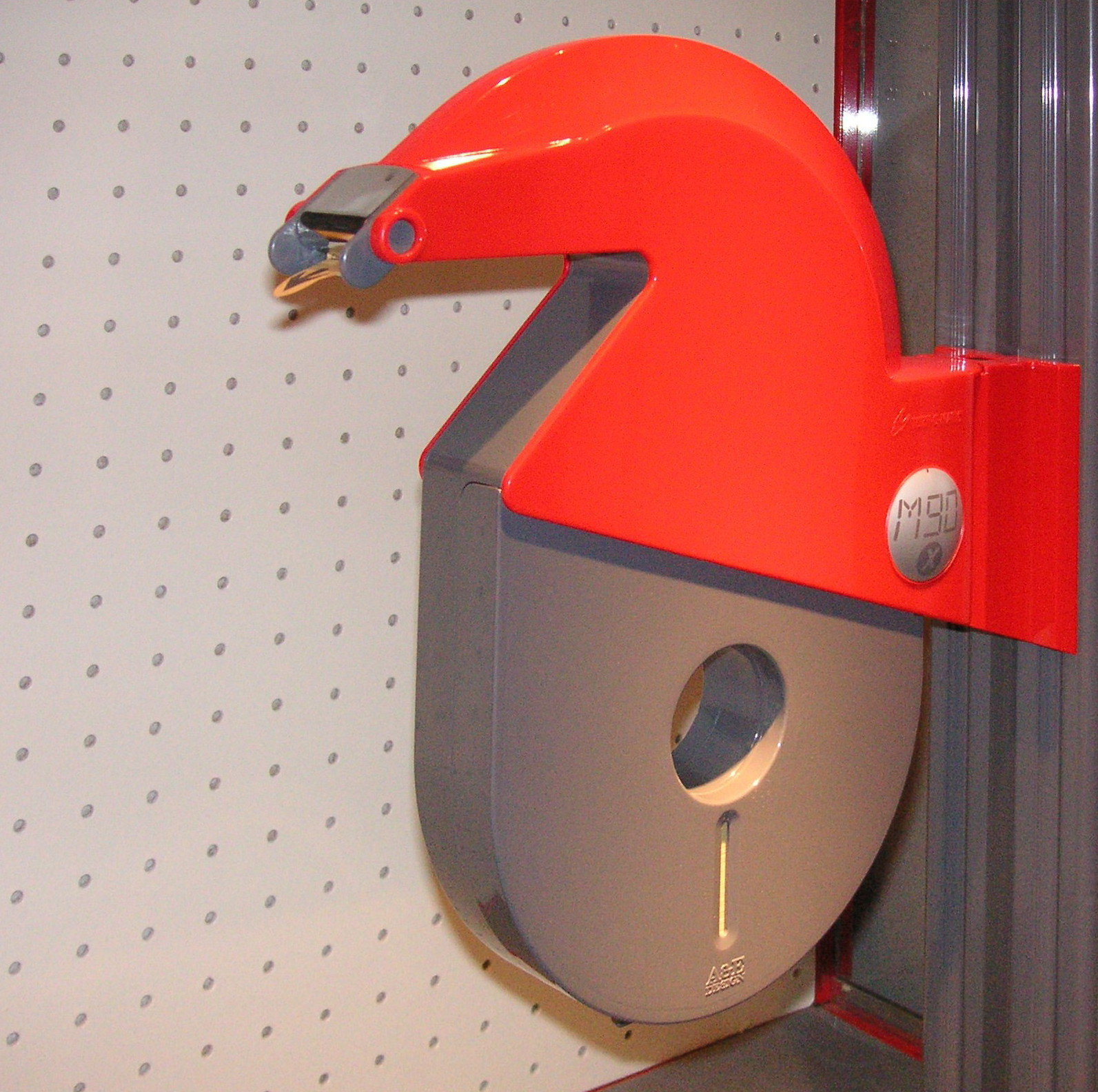
Turn o matic M90

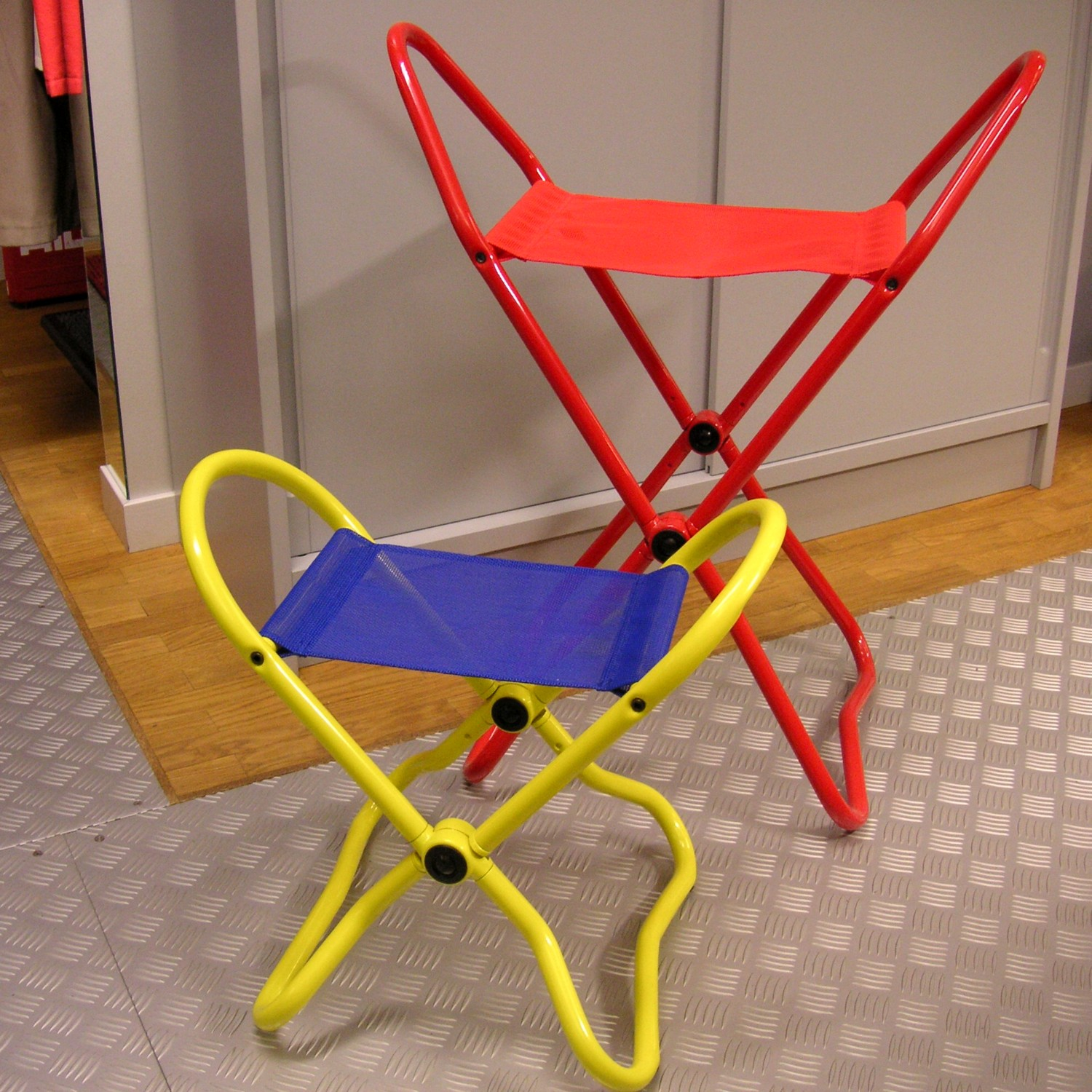
Folding stool for museums 1995

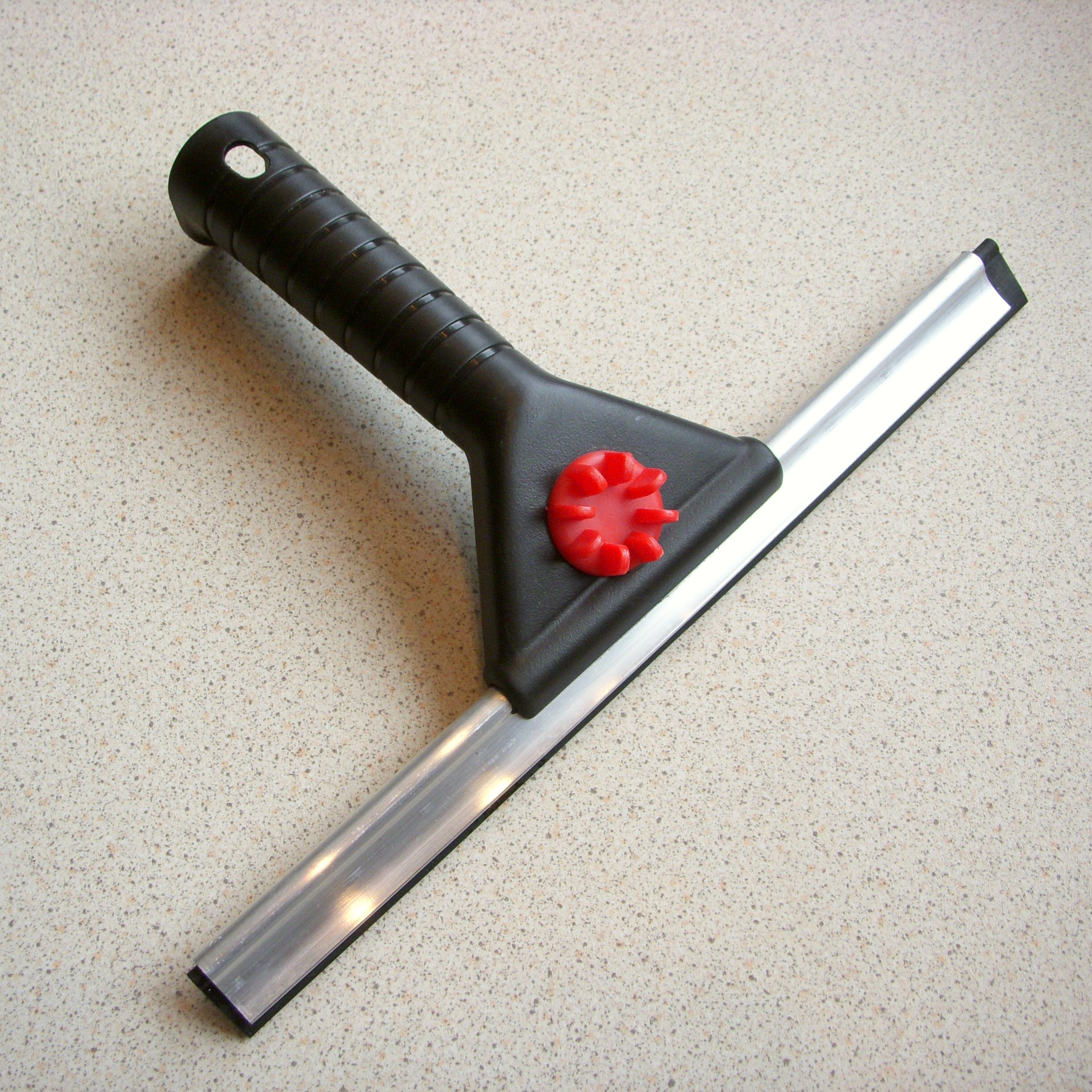
Window squeegee

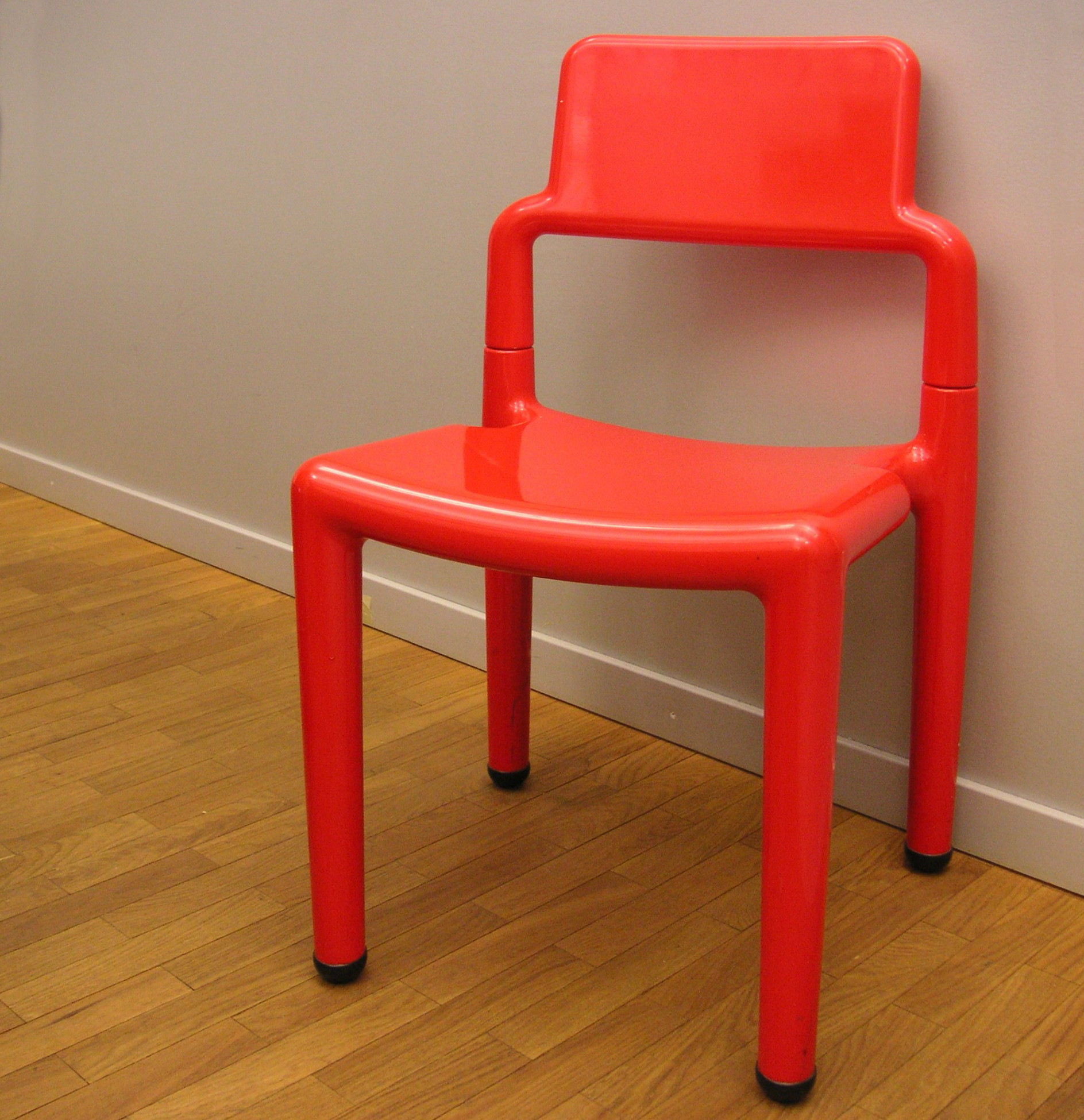
Plastic chair "Bam Bam"

== Bibliography ==
- A&E Design – The Book, Business History Publishing, Stockholm (2018), ISBN 978-91-984266-4-9
