= Royal Institute of Art =

- Kungliga Konsthögskolan
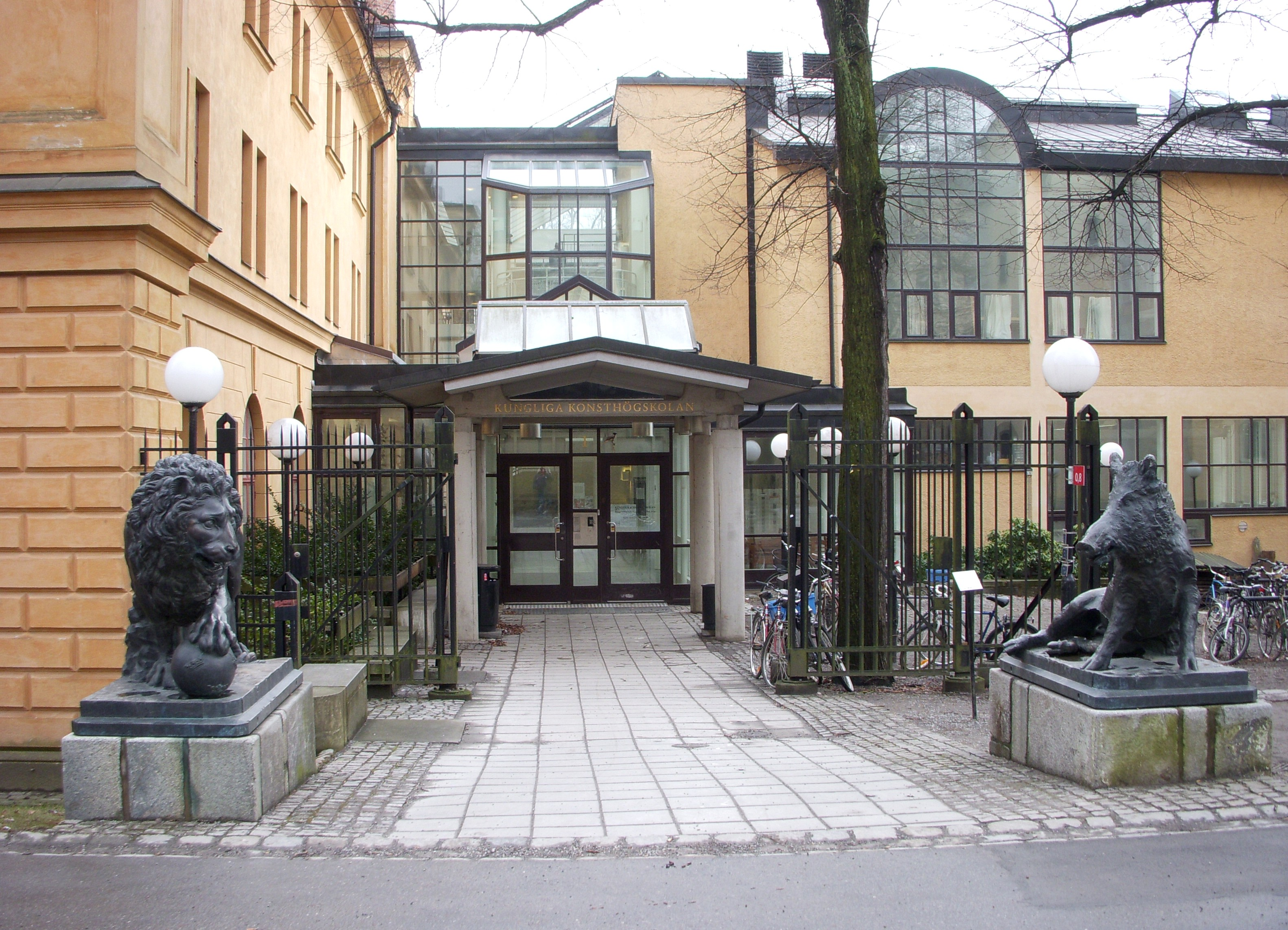
- The Royal Institute in 2009
- Type: University College
- Established: 1735; 290 years ago
- Vice-Chancellor: Sanne Kofod Olsen
- Location: Stockholm, Sweden; 59°19′28.04″N 18°4′58.8″E
- Website: Official website

The Royal Institute of Art (Swedish: Kungliga Konsthögskolan) founded in 1735 is an institution in Stockholm, Sweden for higher education in art. The school was part of the Royal Swedish Academy of Arts, until 1978 when it was made independent. It is under the supervision of the Ministry of Education and Research.

== See also ==
- Konstfack
- Valand School of Fine Arts
- Academy of Fine Arts, Umeå
