= Anna Palm de Rosa =

Swedish artist (1859–1924)

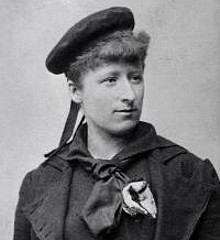
Anna Palm de Rosa

Anna Sofia Palm de Rosa (25 December 1859 – 2 May 1924) was a Swedish artist and landscape painter. In the 1890s she became one of Sweden's most popular painters with her watercolours of steamers and sailing ships and scenes of Stockholm. She also painted a memorable picture of a game of cards in Skagen's Brøndums Hotel while she spent a summer with the Skagen Painters. At the age of 36, Anna Palm left Sweden for good, spending the rest of her life in the south of Italy, where she married an infantry officer.

== Early life and education ==
Born on Christmas Day 1859 in Stockholm, Palm de Rosa was the daughter of the painter Gustaf Wilhelm Palm and Eva Sandberg, who was the daughter of the painter Johan Gustaf Sandberg. The family home at No. 19 Barnhusträdgårdsgatan (today Olof Palmes Gata) was a popular meeting place for their artist friends, including Nils Kreuger, Gustaf Cederström, Georg Pauli and Vicke Andrén (1856–1930). Anna Palm was educated privately by her father, who taught at the Elementary Drawing School (Elementarteckningsskolan), which prepared students for the Royal Swedish Academy of Art.

She did not attend the Royal Academy itself as it was still unusual for women to study there. In the 1880s, Palm de Rosa became a student of the history painter Edvard Perséus and the landscape painter Per Daniel Holm (1835–1903). In 1885, with her parents' support, she travelled to Denmark, where she spent some time in Skagen, painting Et l'hombre parti på Brøndums Hotel (A game of L'hombre in Brøndums Hotel). She also went to Antwerp, where she studied under the marine painter Romain Steppe (1859–1927) before spending some time in Paris.

== Career ==
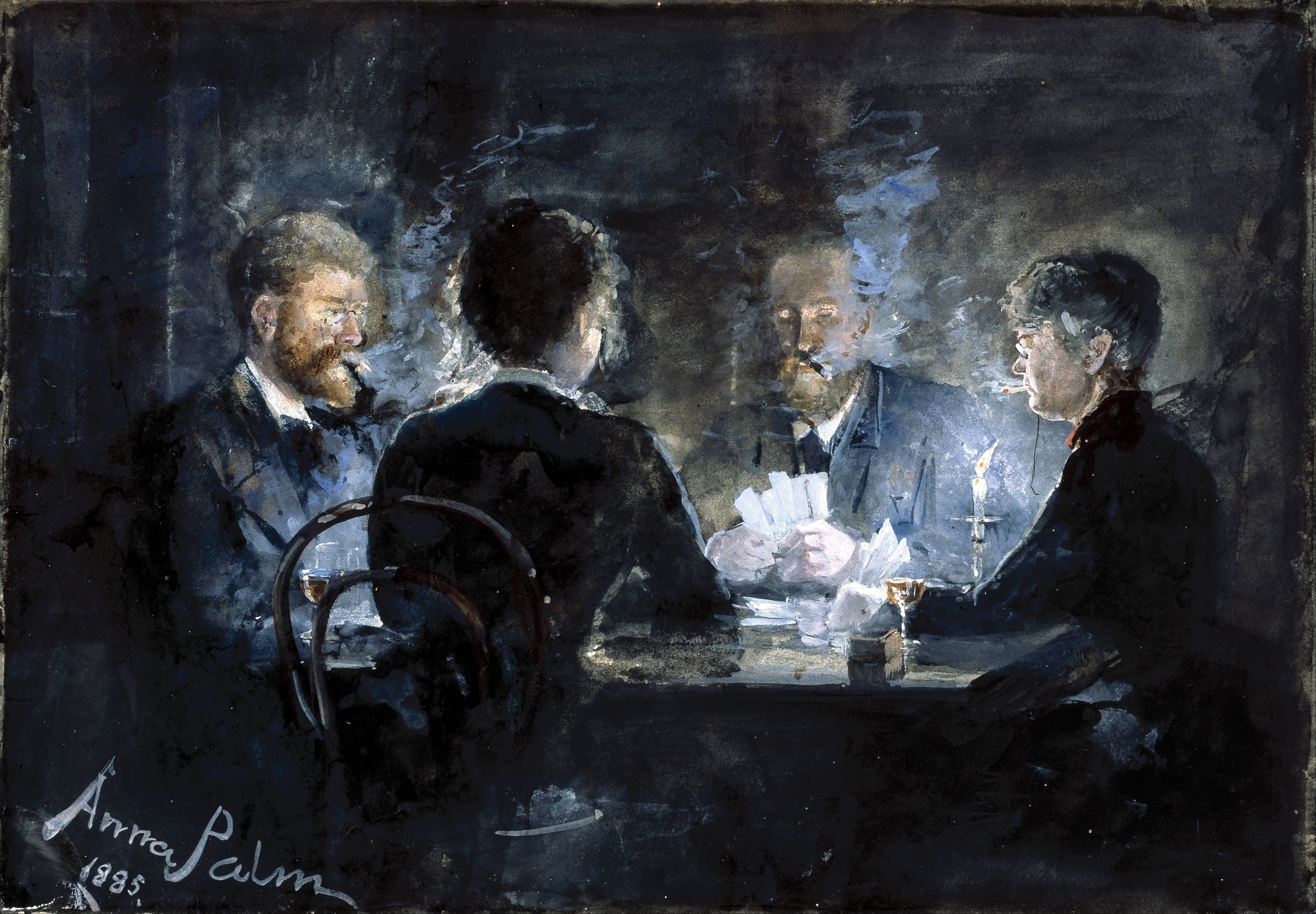
Anna Palm: A game of l'hombre in Brøndums Hotel (1885)

Palm de Rosa was one of 84 artists who signed a letter in 1885 calling for radical changes in the Swedish Academy's teaching, which they considered to be outdated. She nevertheless exhibited at the Academy in 1885 and 1887 and from 1889 to 1891 taught watercolour painting there. She was also a member of the recently formed association: Svenska konstnärinnor (Swedish female artists) together with Eva Bonnier, Hanna Pauli and Mina Carlson-Bredberg. The watercolours of marine scenes with steamers and sailing ships she painted around this time contributed to her rising popularity. She began to produce numerous small vedute to satisfy her many customers while also painting scenes of the city of Stockholm.

On New Year's Eve 1895, at the age of 36, she left Sweden, never to return. After spending a year in Paris, she moved to Italy, where she met her husband-to-be, Infantry Lieutenant Alfredo de Rosa. After their wedding in Paris in 1901, the couple moved first to Capri, then finally settled in the Madonna dell'Arco district of Sant'Anastasia, near Naples in 1908.

In addition to scenes of Italian life, she continued to paint landscapes of Stockholm, including scenes of Gustaf Adolfs torg with the opera building as well as views of the 1897 Art and Industrial Exposition in Stockholm. The only explanation for her interest in such recent developments is that she must have received photographs from Sweden as a basis for her paintings. She may well have used photographs taken by the Stockholm photographer Frans Gustaf Klemming (1859–1922), who was also behind some of the oil paintings of Robert Lundberg (1861–1903); however, she probably drew on views taken by various photographers.

During the First World War, when her husband was called up, Palm de Rosa became extremely productive in her painting, especially in Baiae on the Gulf of Naples, where she spent a year. After the war, she grew increasingly frail until her death in May 1924.

Her work is represented at the Nationalmuseum in Stockholm, Gothenburg Art Museum and Uppsala University as well as at museums in Norrköping and Helsinki.

== Gallery ==
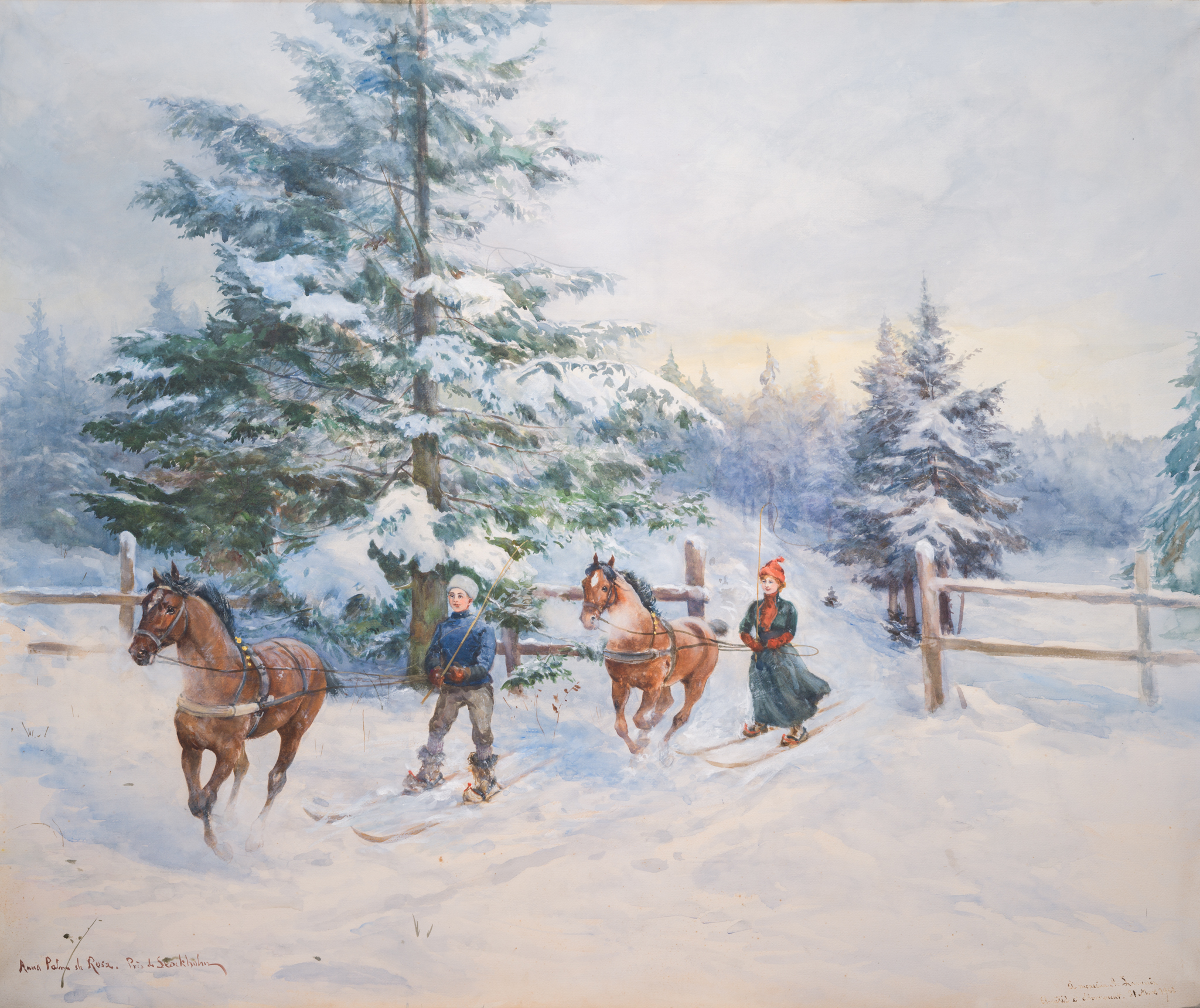
Skijoring, 1902

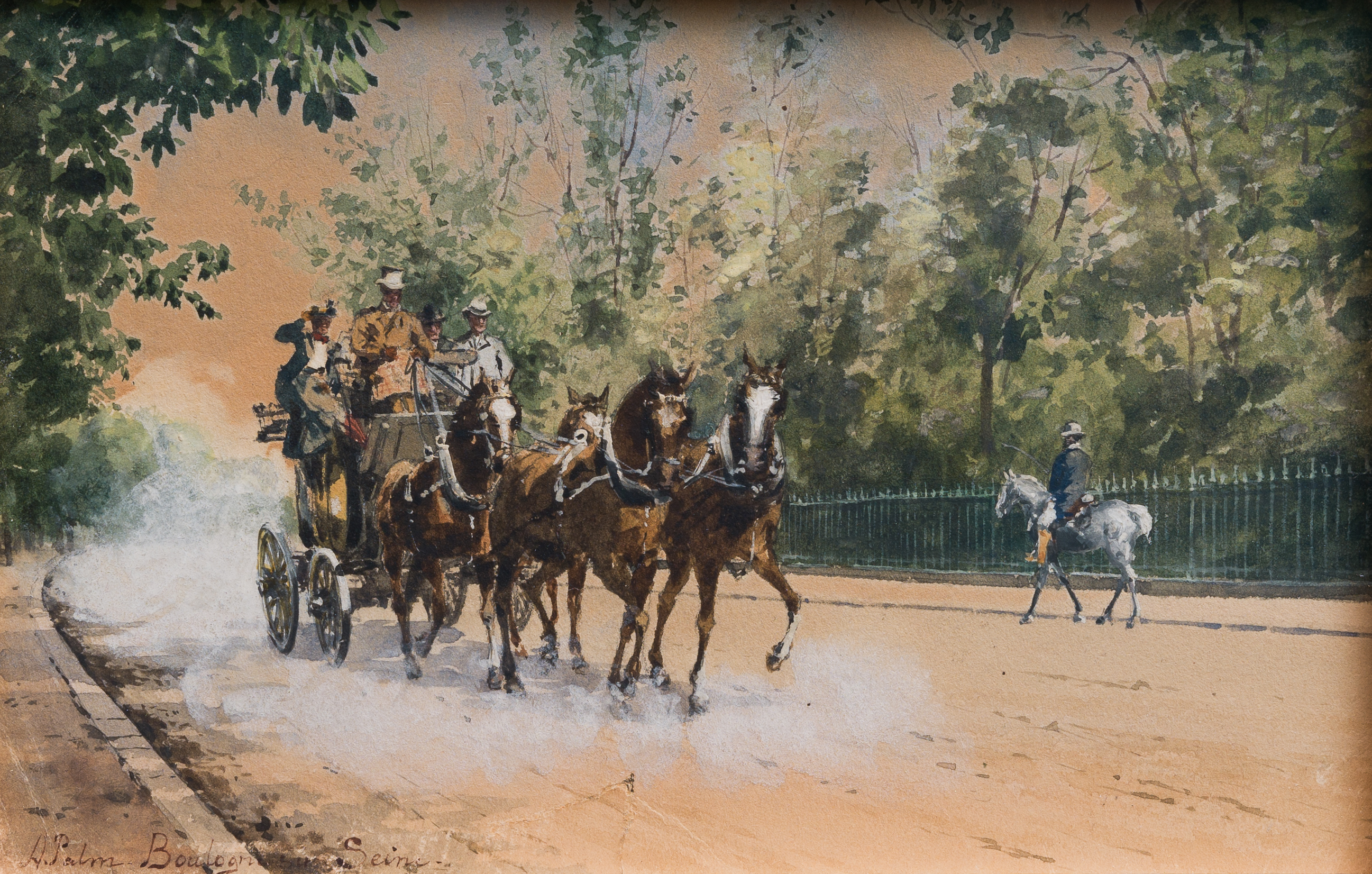
Coach and horses at full speed, Boulogne-sur-Seine

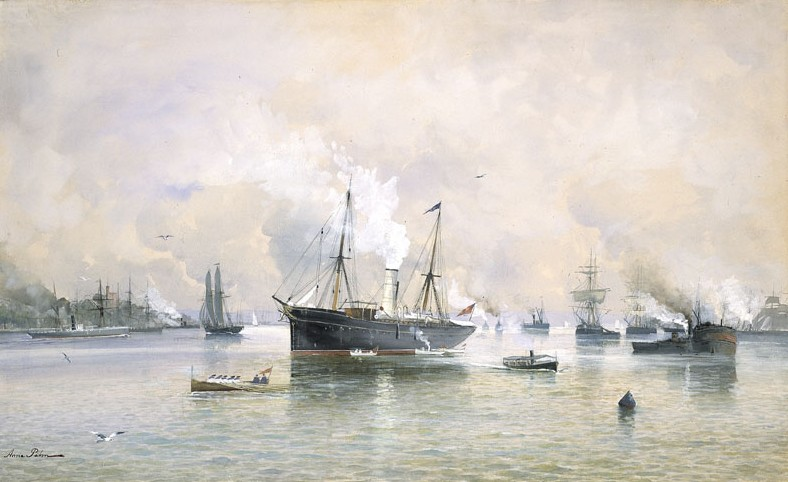
Traffic on Stockholms ström
(Stockholm, 1890)

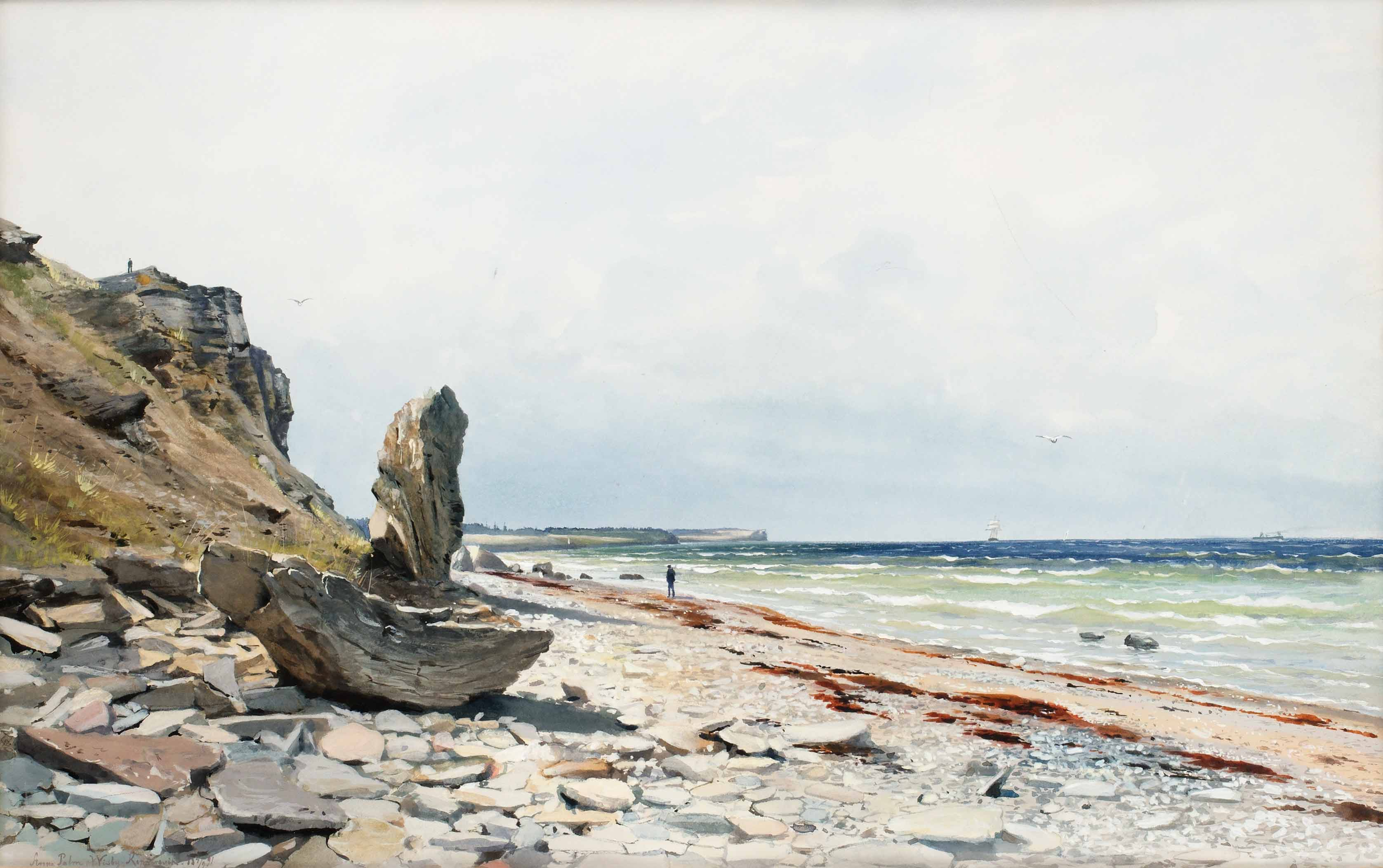
Högklint Cliff
(Gotland,1891)

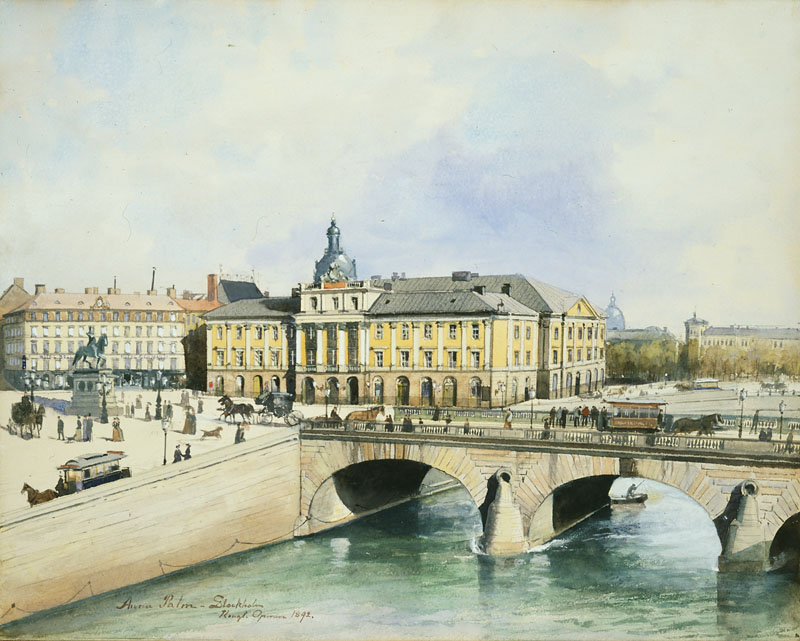
The old opera house from Helgeandsholmen
(Stockholm, 1892)

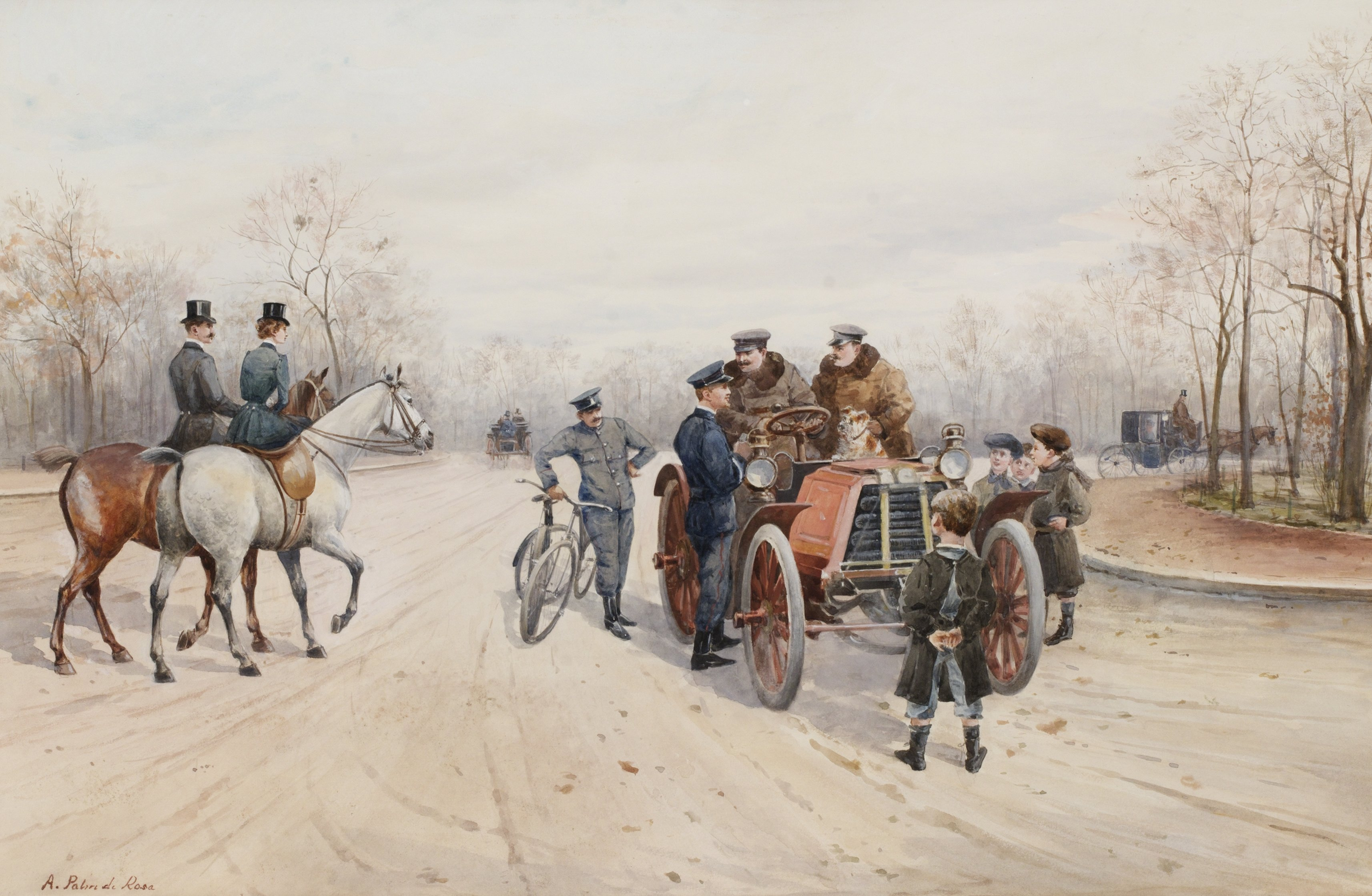
Speeding ticket, Bois de Boulogne
(Paris)

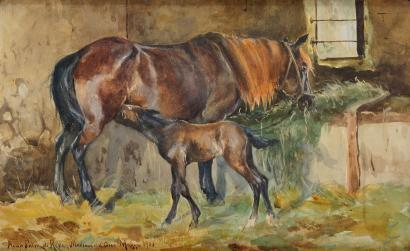
Mare and her foal
(Madonna dell Arco, 1908)
