= Gustaf Wilhelm Palm =

Swedish landscape painter and art professor

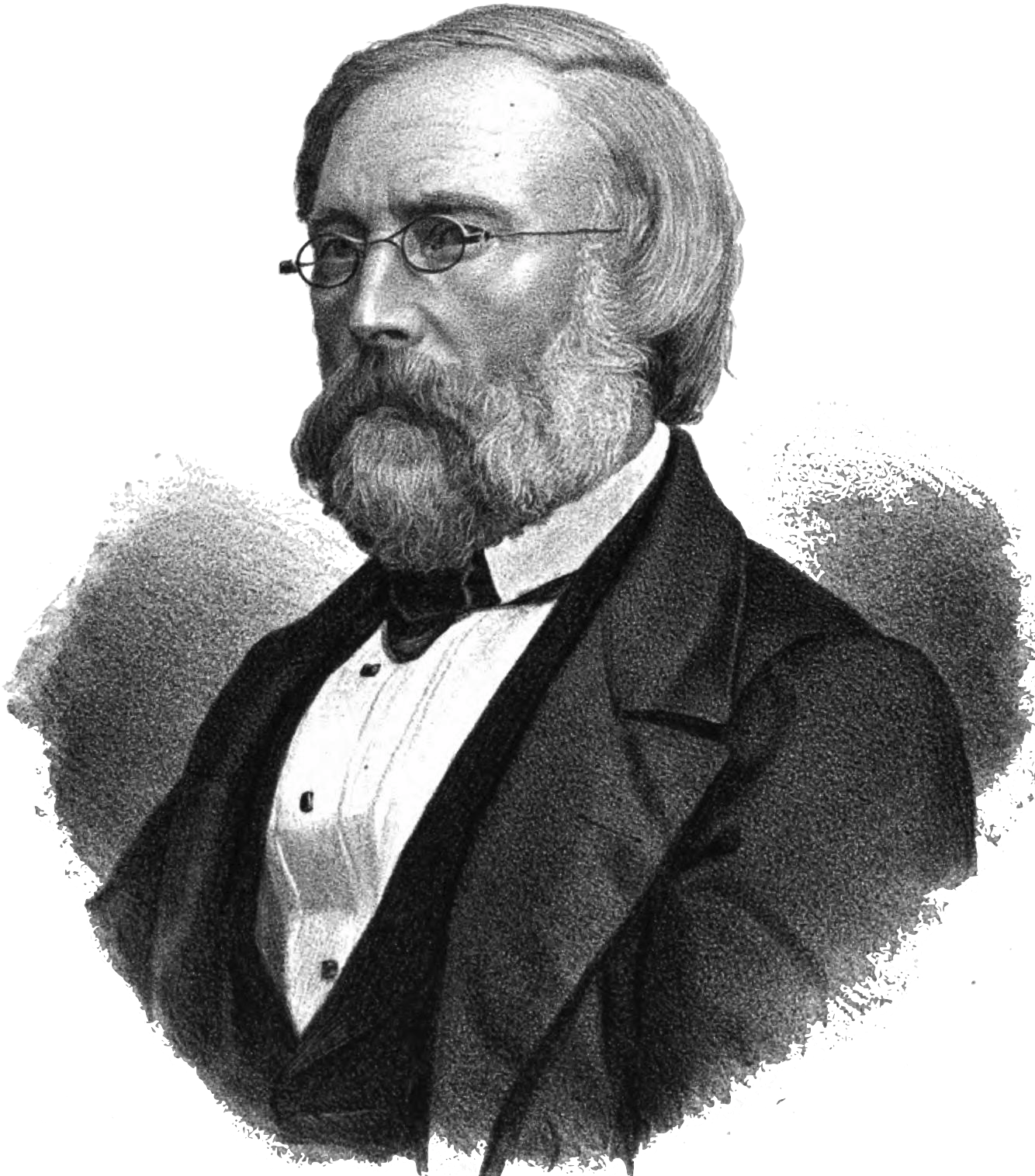
- Born: 14 March 1810 near Kristianstad
- Died: 20 September 1890 (aged 80); Stockholm
- Education: The Royal Swedish Academy of Arts
- Known for: Painting

Gustaf Wilhelm Palm (14 March 1810, Herrelöv's Farm, near Kristianstad - 20 September 1890, Stockholm) was a Swedish landscape painter and art professor.

== Biography ==
After completing his basic education, a friend of the family provided the assistance he needed to study with Anders Arvid Arvidsson in Lund, who taught him drawing. On his recommendation, Palm was able to make some illustrations for a book on European algae by the botanist, Carl Adolph Agardh. He then attended the Royal Swedish Academy of Fine Arts and supported himself by doing more illustrations; notably for the zoologist, Sven Nilsson.

His early paintings were landscapes in the Romantic style that showed the influence of Carl Johan Fahlcrantz. After a trip to Norway in 1833, with Count Michael Gustaf Anckarsvärd, who dabbled in lithography, he came under the influence of Johan Christian Dahl and began to depict nature more realistically. This change came to fruition in his book of lithographs from 1837.

That same year, he went to Berlin for treatment of an unspecified eye disease. Rather than returning home, he travelled throughout Germany and spent two years in Vienna; finally arriving in Rome in 1840. That winter, he went to Venice, filling sketchbooks that he took back to Rome. Altogether, he spent eleven years in Italy, becoming part of a local community of Swedish artists that dominated the Swedish art scene until the ascension of the Düsseldorf School.

In 1851, he toured through Spain and Paris on his way back to Sweden. The following year, he was named a member of the Royal Academy. In 1856, he married Eva Sandberg, the daughter of Professor Johan Gustaf Sandberg. Their daughter, Anna Palm de Rosa, also became a painter. He began teaching at the academy in 1859. His students gave him the nickname "Palma Vecchio" (Old Palm, in Italian), and he began signing his paintings with a picture of a palm tree. Upon his retirement in 1880, he was named professor emeritus. He remained uninfluenced by the new styles of art that developed during his last years.

His works may be seen at the Nationalmuseum, Göteborgs konstmuseum and the Uppsala University Library.

== Gallery ==
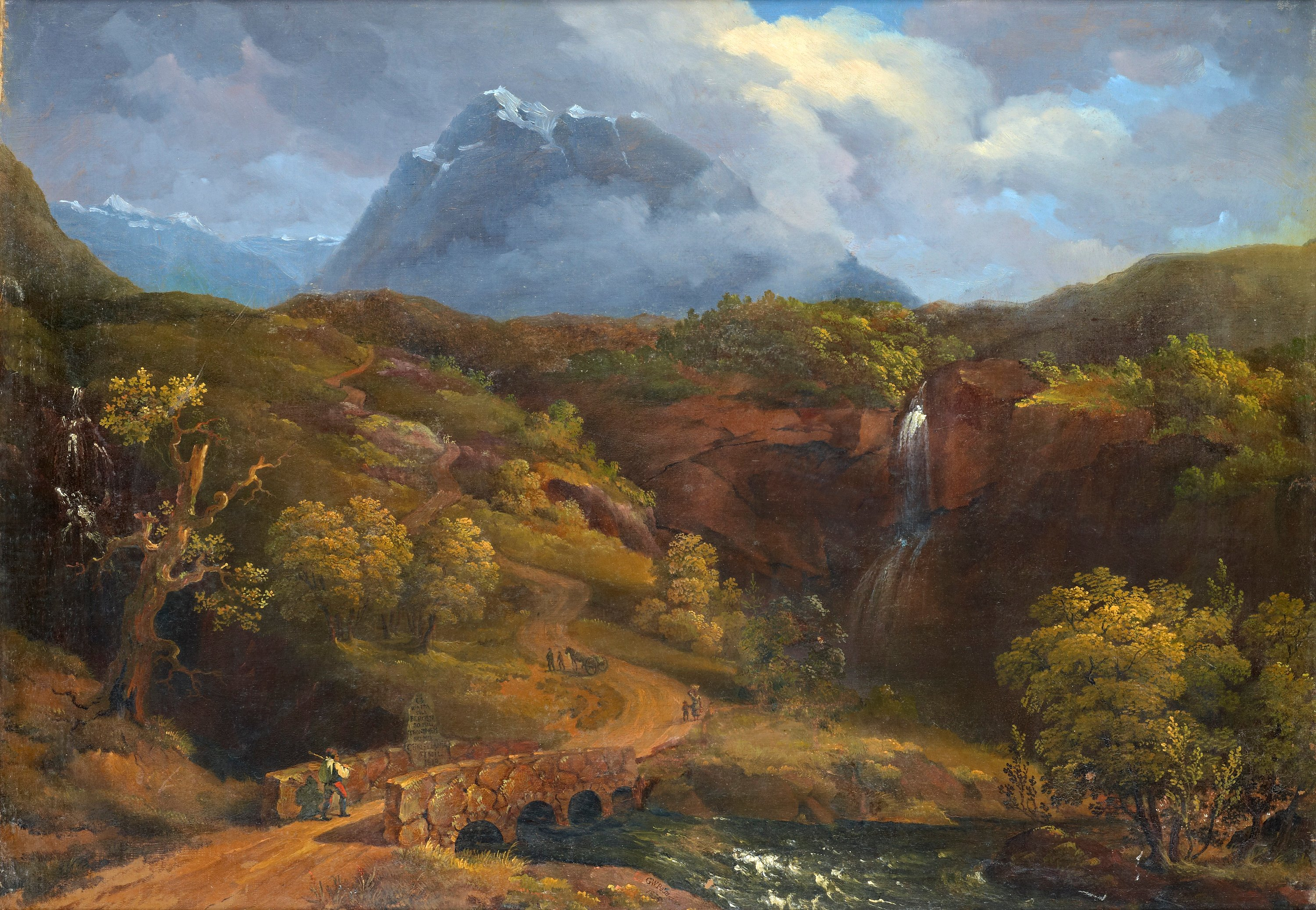
Motif from Norway (1835)

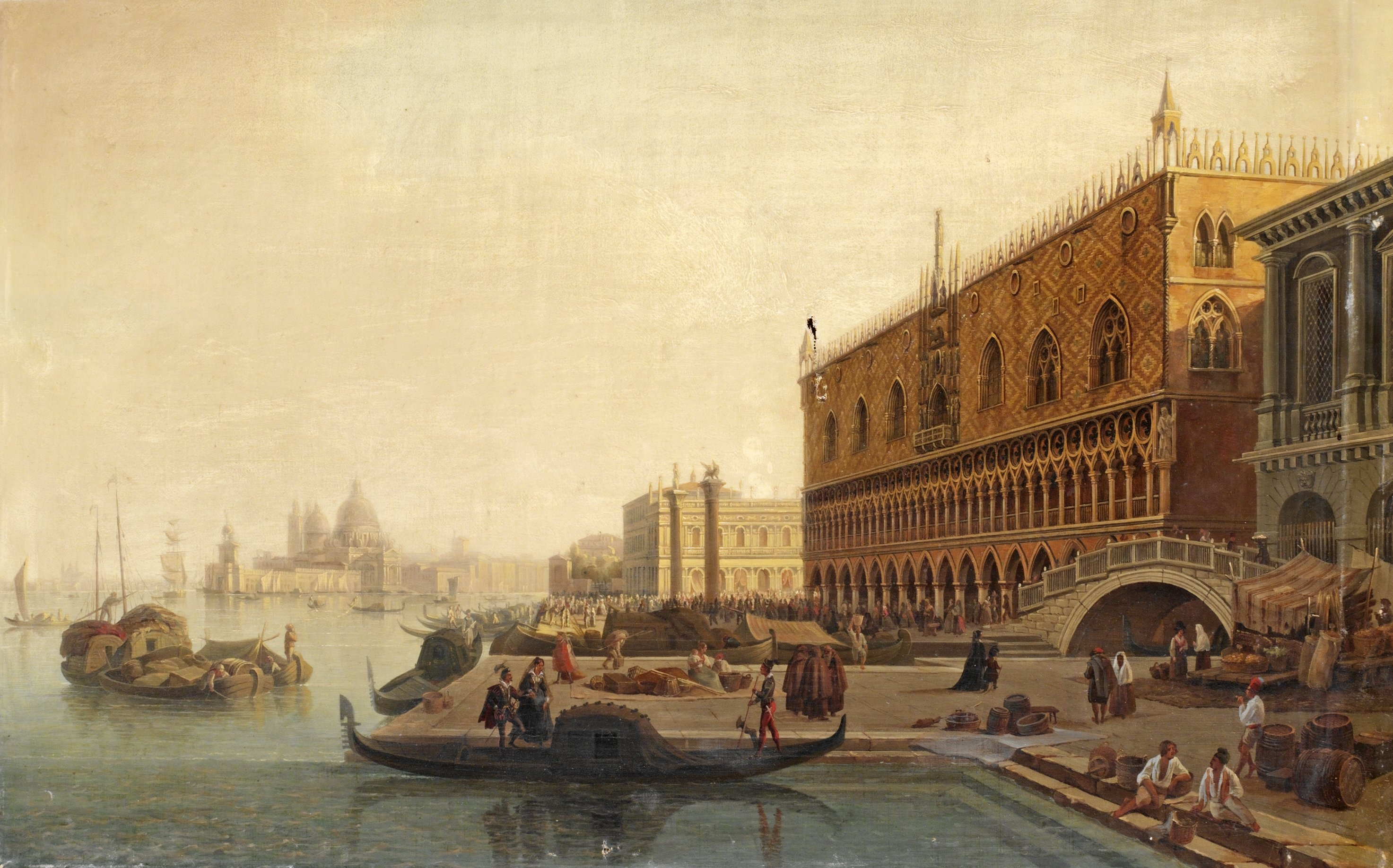
View of Venice (1843)

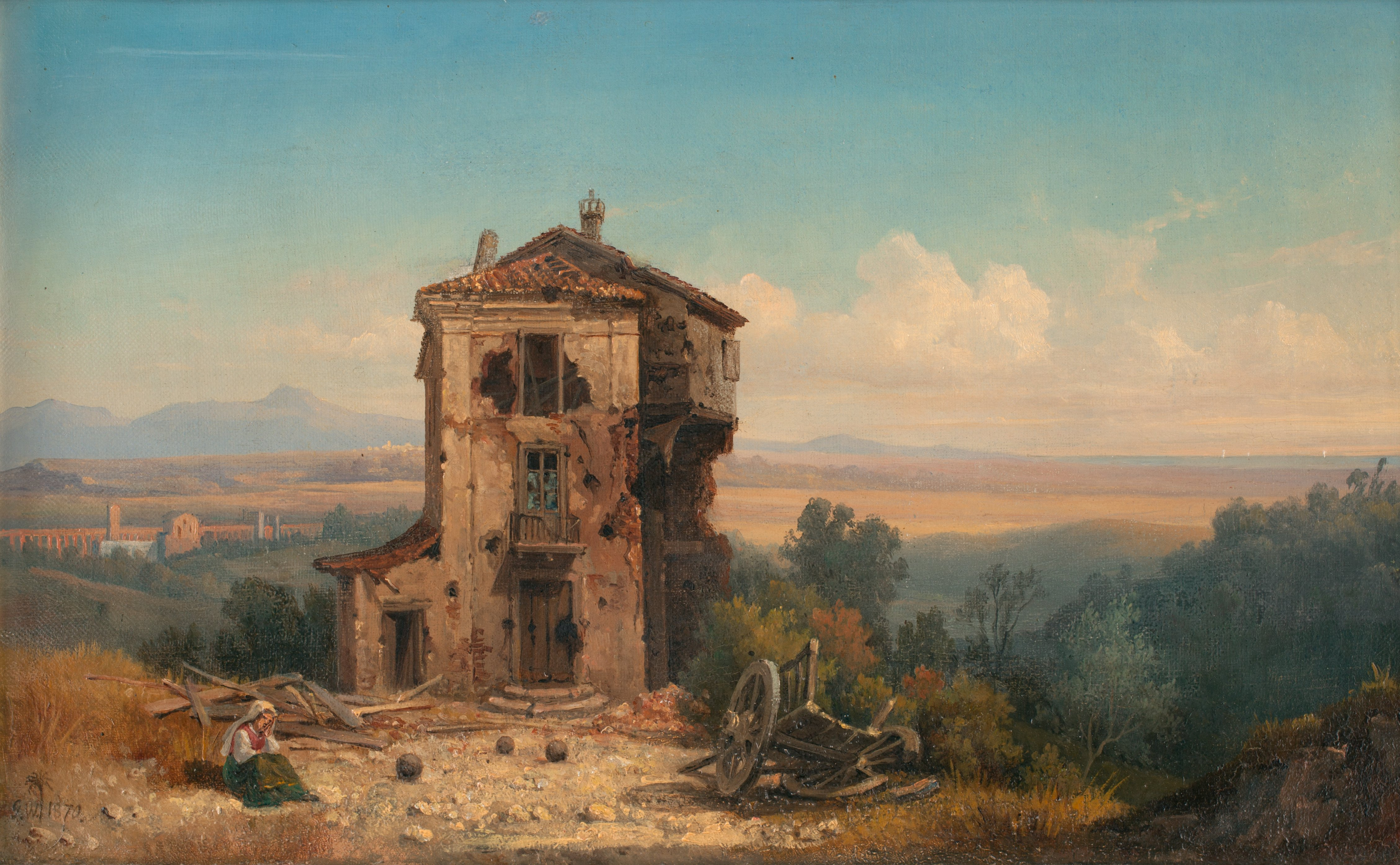
The Roman Campagna (1870)

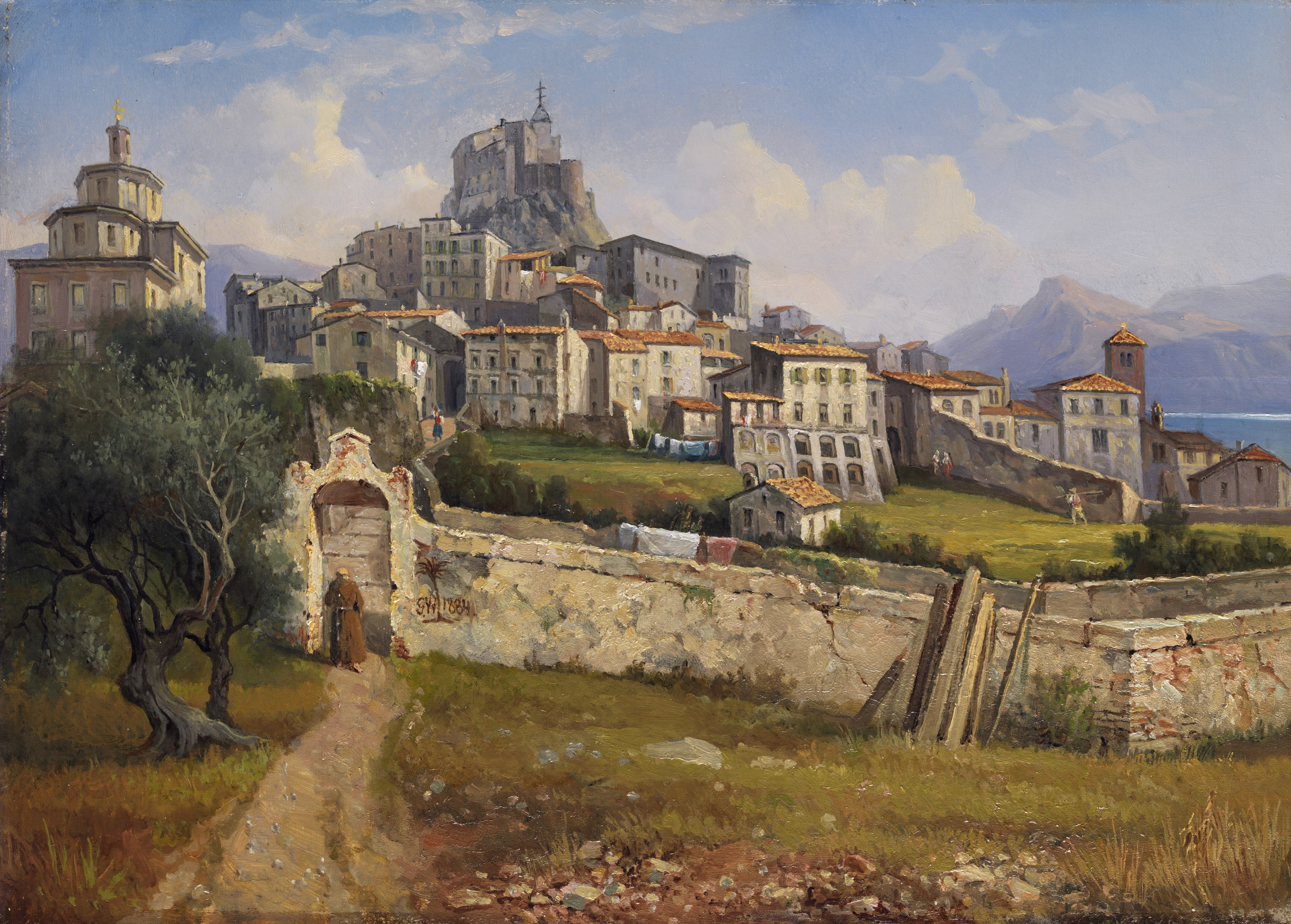
View of Subiaco (1884)
