= Anna Nordgren =

Swedish artist (1847–1916)

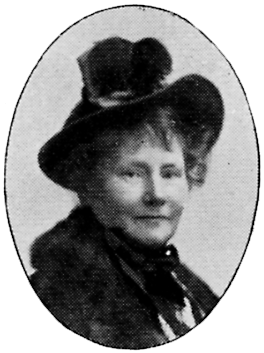
Anna Nordgren, from the Svenskt Porträttgalleri XX

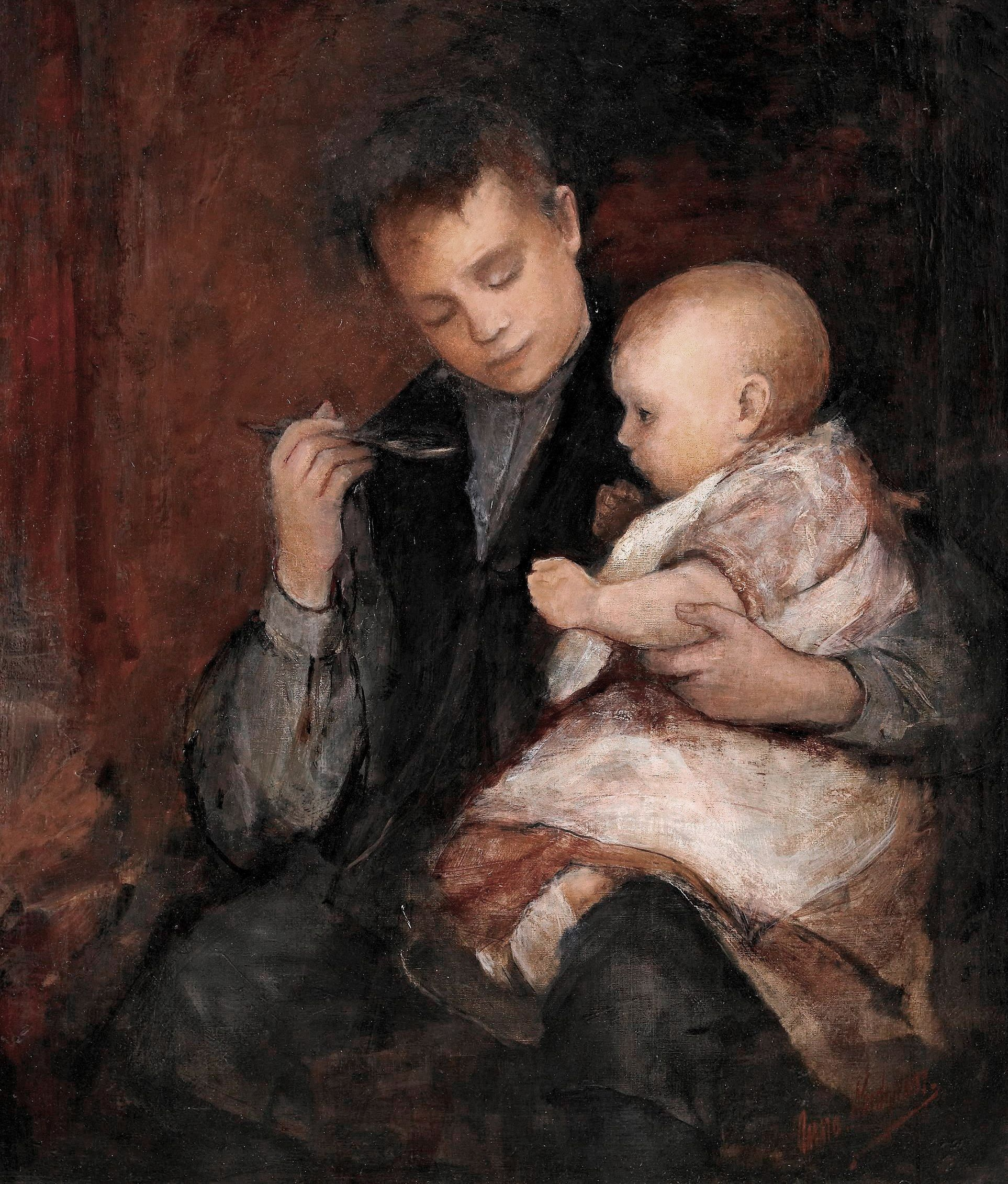
Feeding Lillian c. 1916

Anna Christina Nordgren (13 May 1847 – 10 September 1916 ) was a Swedish painter and draftswoman. She specialized in portraits and genre scenes. Her work is mostly a variation on the Academic style and she remained unimpressed by Impressionism.

== Biography ==
She was born at Mariestad to landowning family. The year she was born, they moved to Åsen, an estate near Hjo. Ten years later, they returned to Mariestad then in the 1860s, lived at Sjögerås, another estate near Falköping.

She attended the girls' school in Skara, where her teachers noticed her artistic talent and began giving her lessons in oil painting. In 1865, she enrolled in formal studies at the Slöjdskolan Stockholm and later became one of the first female students at the Royal Swedish Academy of Fine Arts. While there, she studied with Carl Gustaf Qvarnström (1810–1867) and after his death, with Johan Christoffer Boklund (1817–1880). On the advice of Boklund, she went to Paris in 1874 to continue her studies. She travelled together with Amanda Sidwall (1844–1892) and Johanna Sophia Södergren (1847–1923).

She began her studies at the Académie Julian with Tony Robert-Fleury (1837–1911) and took additional lessons at the private academy of Carolus-Duran. She would remain in Paris until 1883 and came under the influence of Jules Bastien-Lepage. In 1876, two of her works were exhibited at the Centennial Exposition in Philadelphia. The following year, one of the paintings she had on exhibit at the Royal Academy was purchased by King Oscar. She became close friends with Russian artist Marie Bashkirtseff (1858–1884) and was able to exhibit at the Salon de Paris in 1879. After leaving Paris, she spent some time painting in Brittany.

Her next stopping point was London, where she participated in numerous exhibitions, including two solo showings at the Clifford Galleries in 1894 and 1897. She also showed her works in Glasgow, Liverpool and Birmingham. Her friends there included James McNeill Whistler and the Irish painter, Sarah Purser. She took Constance Markievicz (then Constance Gore-Booth) as a student and, together with Purser, they took a study trip to Ireland in 1892.

In 1899, she returned to Sweden, but continued to visit London on a regular basis. In 1904, her works were shown at the Louisiana Purchase Exposition in St. Louis. She lived in various places, beginning with Gothenburg, then in 1908 in Drottningholm, the following year in Stockholm, then in Skara from 1913 until her death.
