= Elisabeth Keyser =

Swedish artist (1851–1898)

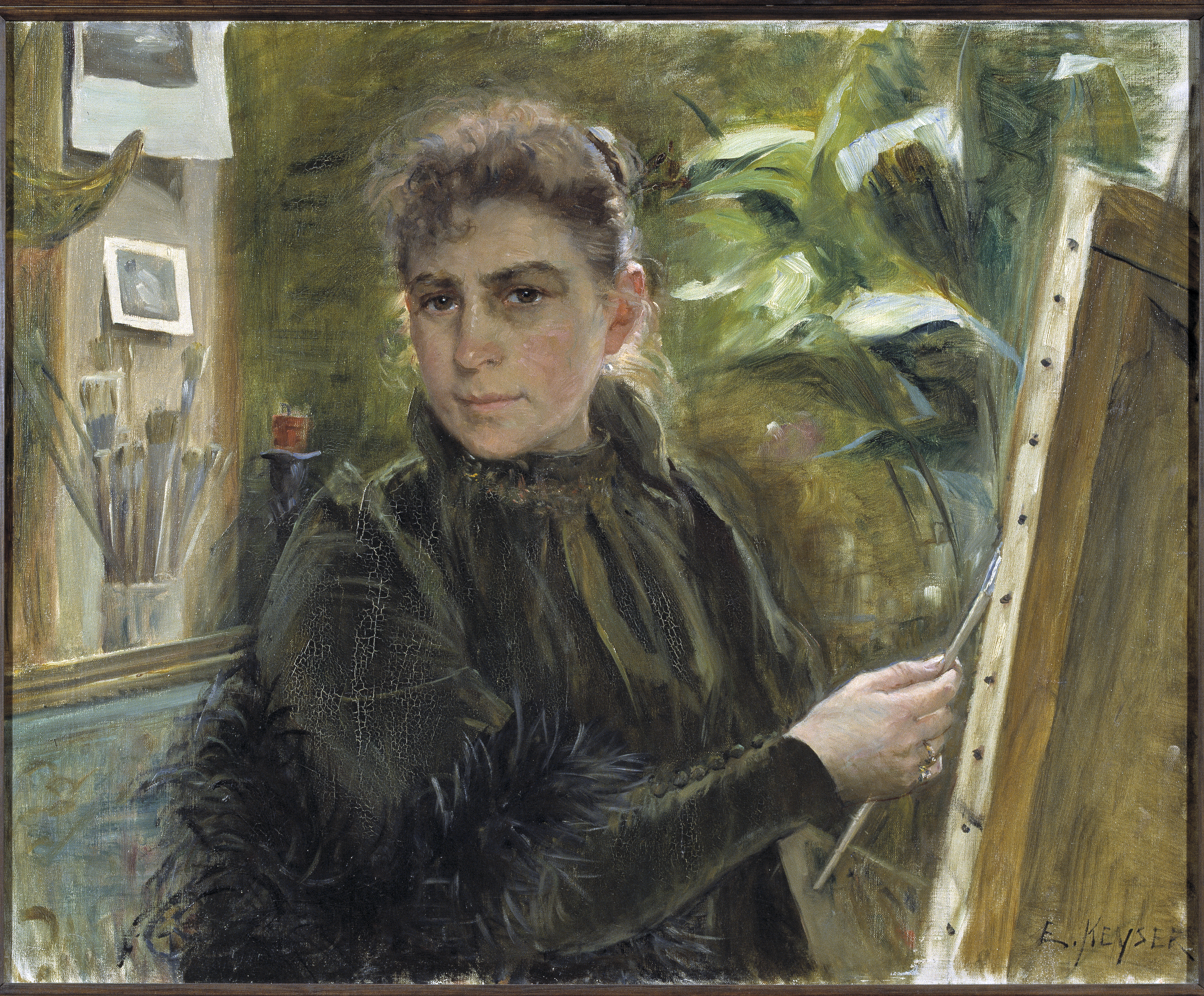
- Self-Portrait, 1880
- Born: Maria Helena Jolin; 22 January 1851; Stockholm, Sweden
- Died: 16 December 1898 (aged 47); Stockholm, Sweden
- Known for: Painting

Hilda Elisabeth Keyser (1851–1898), was a Swedish painter.

== Biography ==
Keyser was born on 22 January 1851 in Stockholm. From 1874–78, she attended the Royal Swedish Academy of Fine Arts in Stockholm. She was taught by Swedish painter Vilhelmina Carlson. From 1878–89, she stayed mostly in Paris, where she studied for Léon Bonnat. From 1890 to 1896, she ran a painting school in Stockholm.

She exhibited at the Paris Salon in 1882, 1883, 1884, 1887, 1888, 1989, and 1890. In 1893 she exhibited her work at the Palace of Fine Arts at the World's Columbian Exposition in Chicago, Illinois.

Keyser died on 16 December 1898 in Stockholm.

== Gallery ==
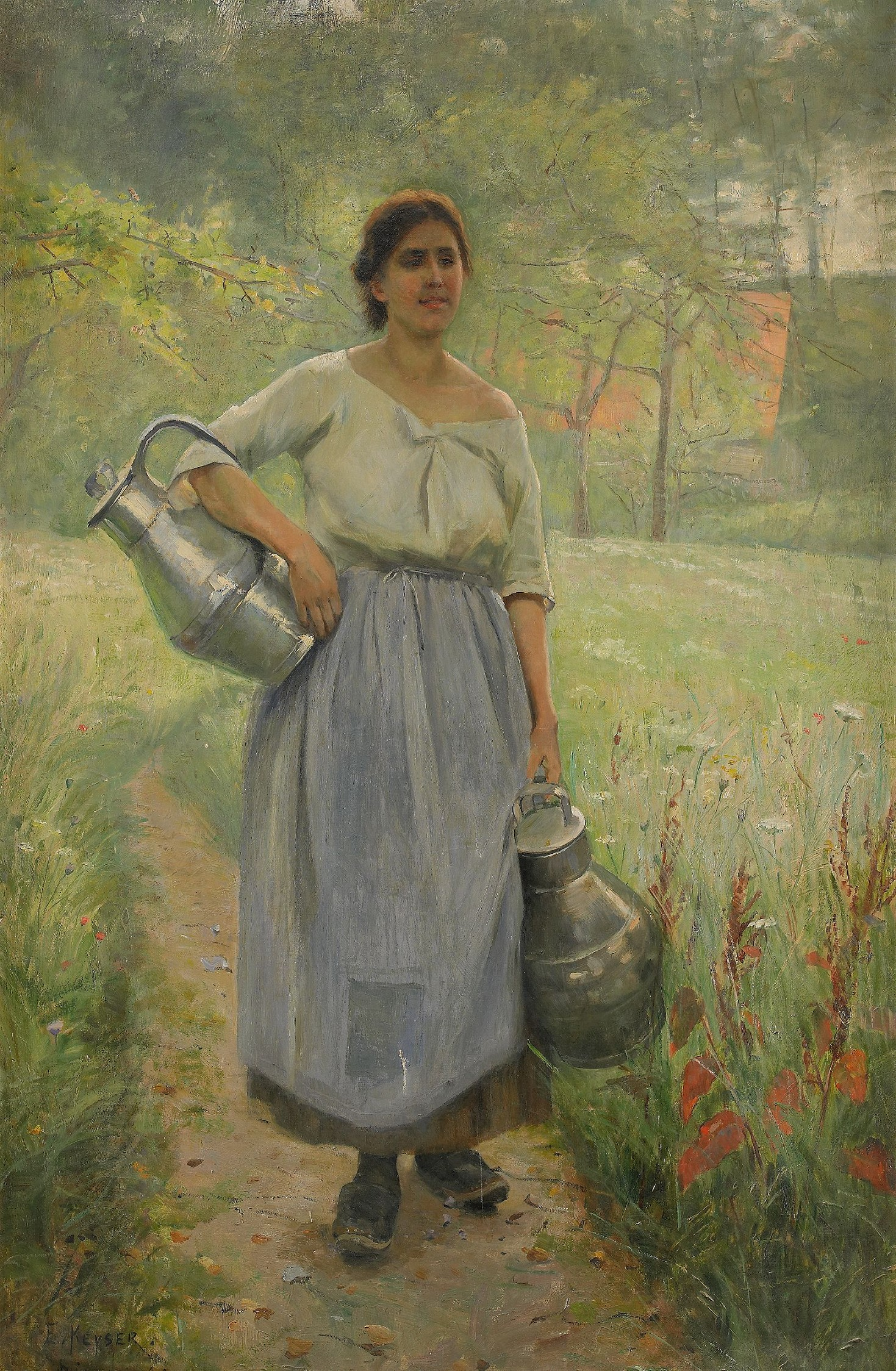
French peasant girl with milk pans

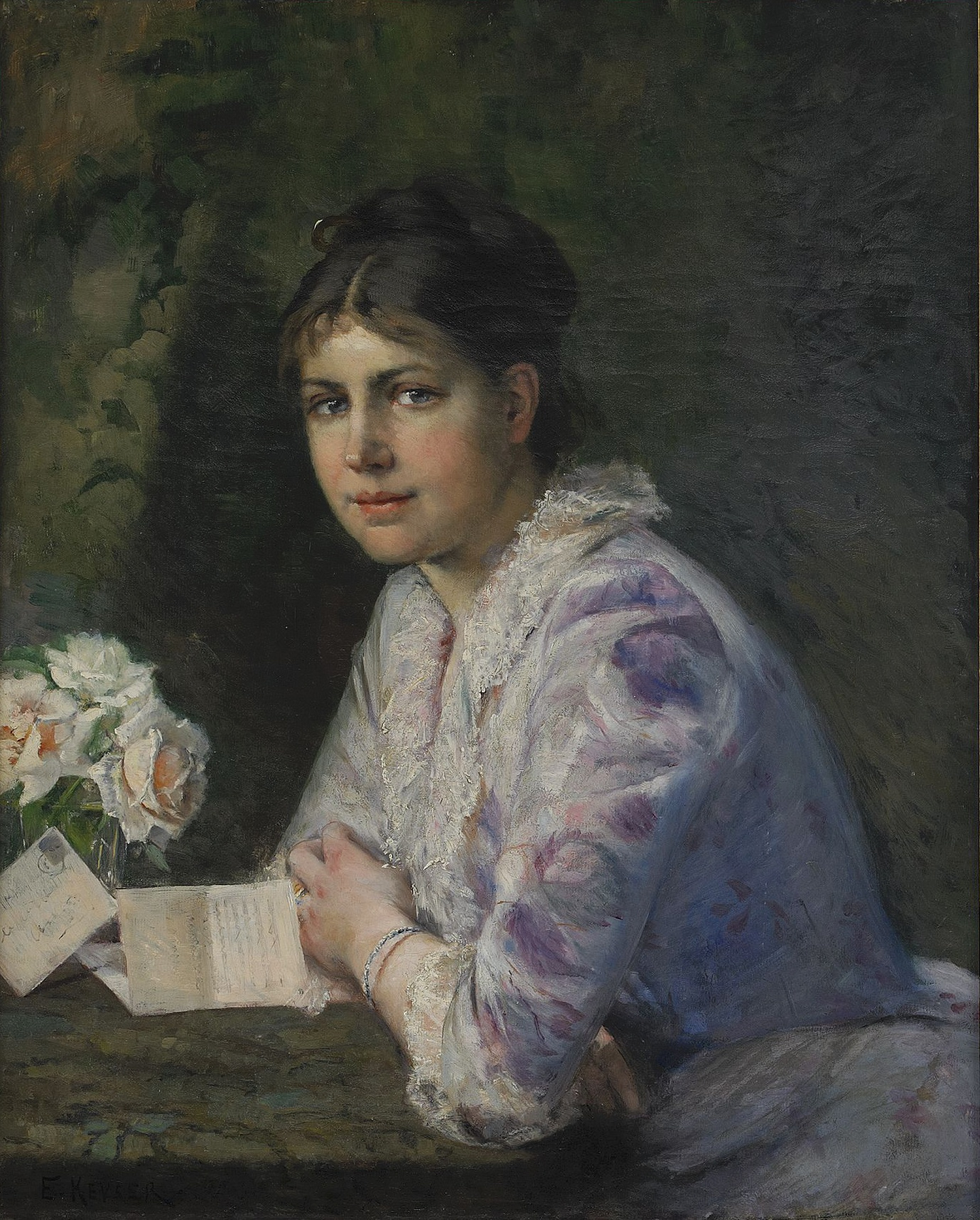
Day dreams

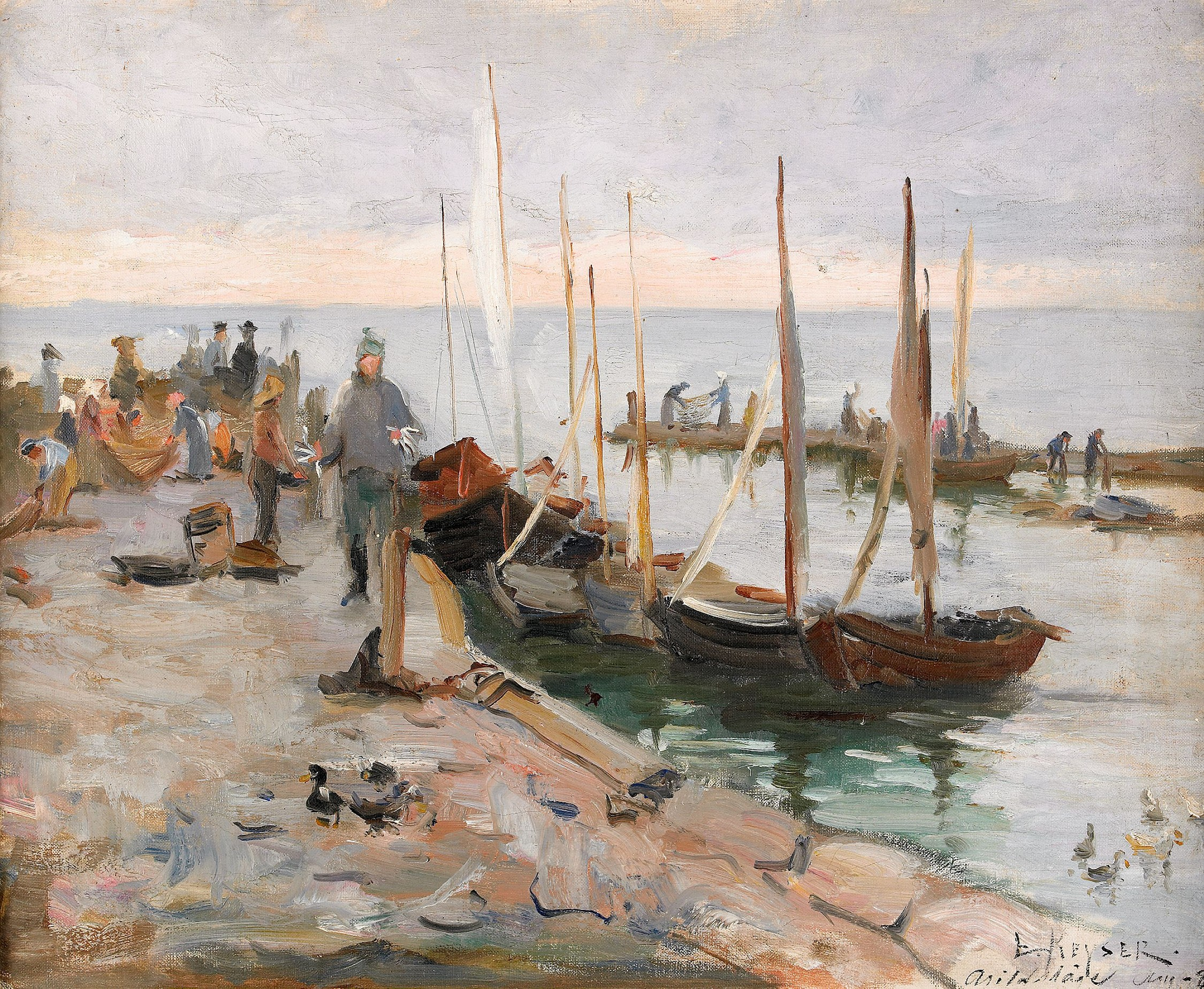
Fångsten bärgas - Arildsläge

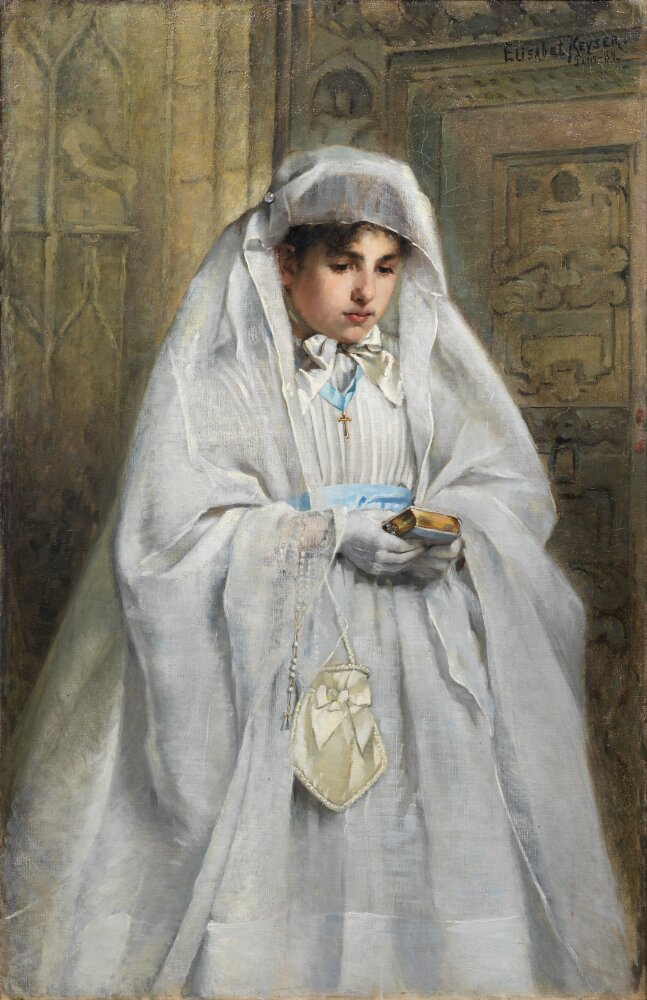
A Confirmand in Normandy, 1889

Hilda Fredrika Keyser, Author, 1889
