= Amanda Sidwall =

Swedish artist (1844–1892)

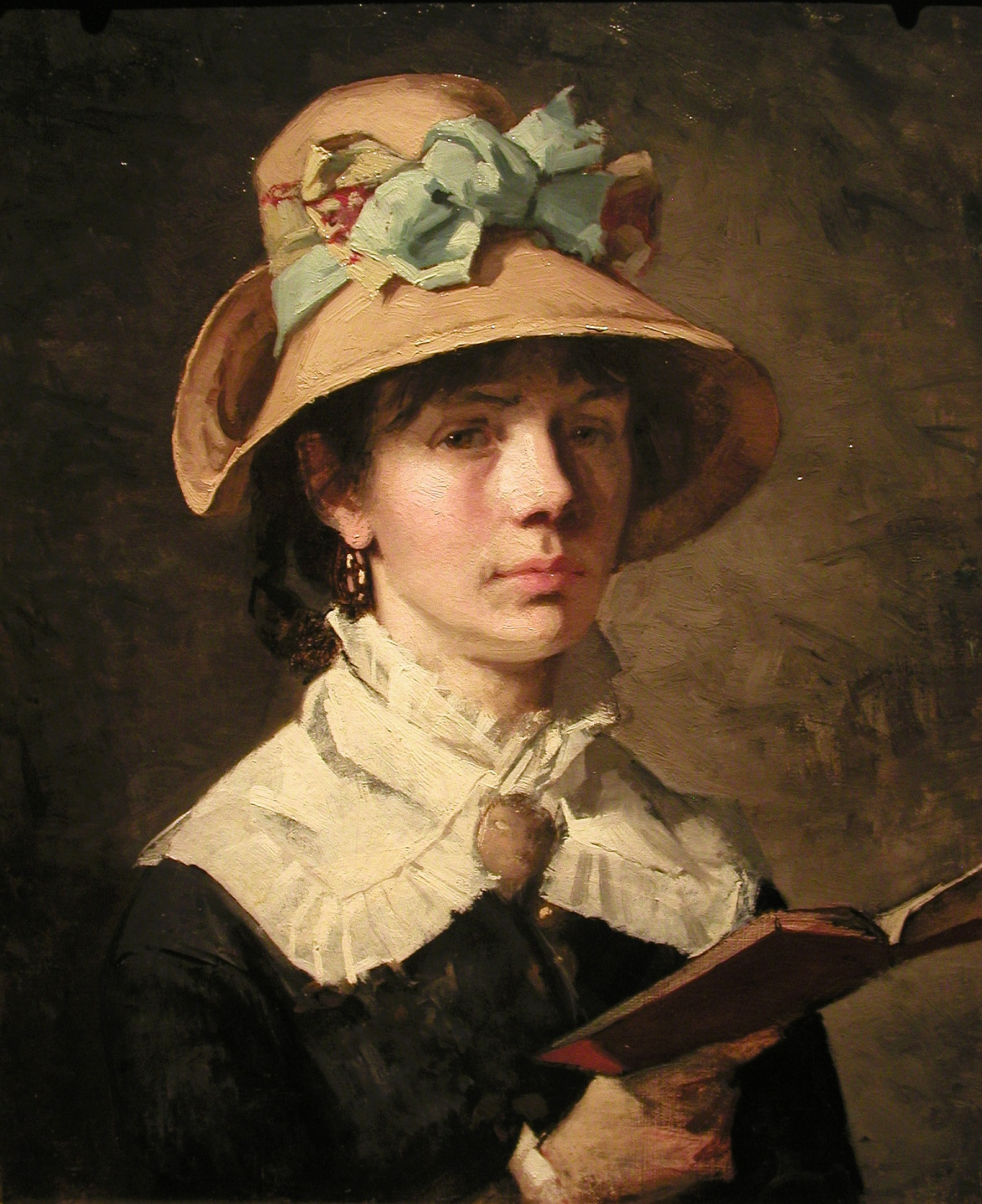
Self-portrait (1871)

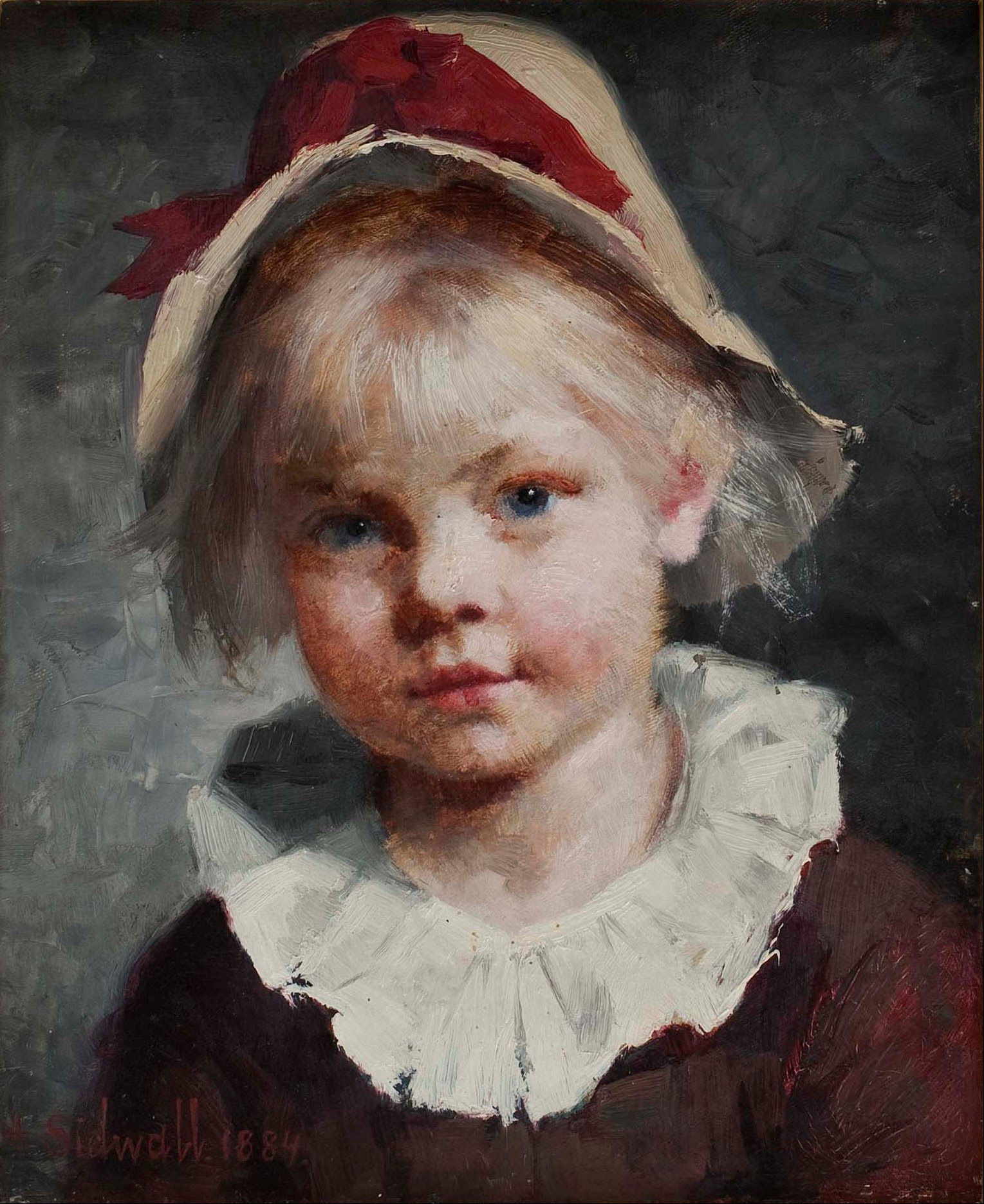
The Thief of Hearts (1884) by Amanda Sidwall

Amanda Carolina Vilhelmina Sidwall (25 July 1844 – 11 January 1892) was a Swedish painter and illustrator. She studied in Paris in the 1870s and had works exhibited at the Salon in the early 1880s.

== Biography ==
Sidwall was born in Stockholm on 25 July 1844, the daughter of tanner Sven Lorentz Sidwall and his wife Frederica Christina. Together with her sister Mathilda, she first studied ornamental and figure drawing in 1860 at the Arts and Crafts School in Stockholm. She was among the first group of students to study at the women's department of the Royal Swedish Academy of Arts when it opened in 1864. Together with fellow-student Anna Nordgren, she then continued her studies under Tony Robert-Fleury at the Académie Julian in Paris (1874–77), developing a much freer style, as can be seen in her portrait of Mina Carlson-Bredberg.

She remained in Paris for several years, receiving good reviews and exhibiting at the Musée du Luxembourg, where she sold two works, including Lecture intéressante showing a girl reading to an old man. She also had several paintings accepted at the Salon in 1880 and 1882. Although she did not receive any awards, she was able to sell several works both privately and to the State.

In 1883, she returned to Stockholm as an established artist. She opened her own studio where she also made a living teaching students. Both she and her mother died of influenza in the winter of 1891–92. Amanda Sidwall died on 11 January 1892.

Sidwall's works were first widely recognized in 1942, 50 years after her death, when they were exhibited in Stockholm. They also appeared in various exhibitions in the late 20th century, both in Paris and Stockholm.
