= Mina Carlson-Bredberg =

Swedish painter (1857–1943)

Wilhelmina Carlson-Bredberg
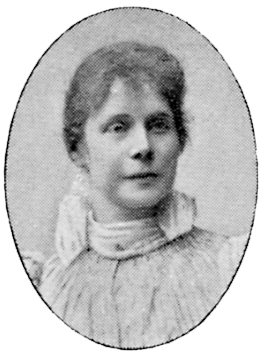
- Born: Wilhelmina Bredberg; 2 September 1857; Stockholm, Sweden
- Died: 9 June 1943 (aged 85); Stockholm, Sweden
- Education: Academie Julien
- Movement: Arts and Crafts Movement
- Spouses: Vilhelm Swalin (m. 1877–1885) Georg Carlson (m. 1895)

Wilhelmina Carlson-Bredberg (1857–1943), known as Mina, was a Swedish painter. She is particularly well known for her portraits, and scenes from contemporary life.

== Biography ==
Bredberg was born on 2 September 1857 in Stockholm to wealthy parents who participated in Swedish cultural life. Her uncle was the noted newspaper publisher and critic Lars Johan Hierta. As a teenager she took private painting lessons from Kerstin Cardon. She was also taught by Elisabeth Keyser.

At the age of twenty she was obliged by social convention to marry a family friend, Vilhelm Swalin, whom she had been observed kissing. For the seven years of her marriage she relinquished her painting career.

She left her marriage in 1885 to travel to Paris to resume her training, alongside many of her Nordic female contemporaries. She studied at the Academie Julian until 1887, under the tutelage of Jules Lefebvre and Gustave Boulanger. She formed a strong friendship with Louise Catherine Breslau.

She returned to Stockholm in 1890 to teach at the art school established by Elisabeth Keyser, but travelled often throughout Europe. In this period she forged strong links with English Arts and Crafts Movement figures such as William Morris.

Carlson-Bredberg exhibited her work at the Palace of Fine Arts at the 1893 World's Columbian Exposition in Chicago, Illinois.

In 1895 she married architect Georg Carlson, and again her artistic output was hampered by marriage.

Carlson-Bredberg died on 9 June 1943 in Stockholm. She was included in the 2018 exhibit Women in Paris 1850–1900.

Her works are held in the National Museum, the Prins Eugens Waldermarsudde, and the Gothenburg Museum of Art.

== Gallery ==
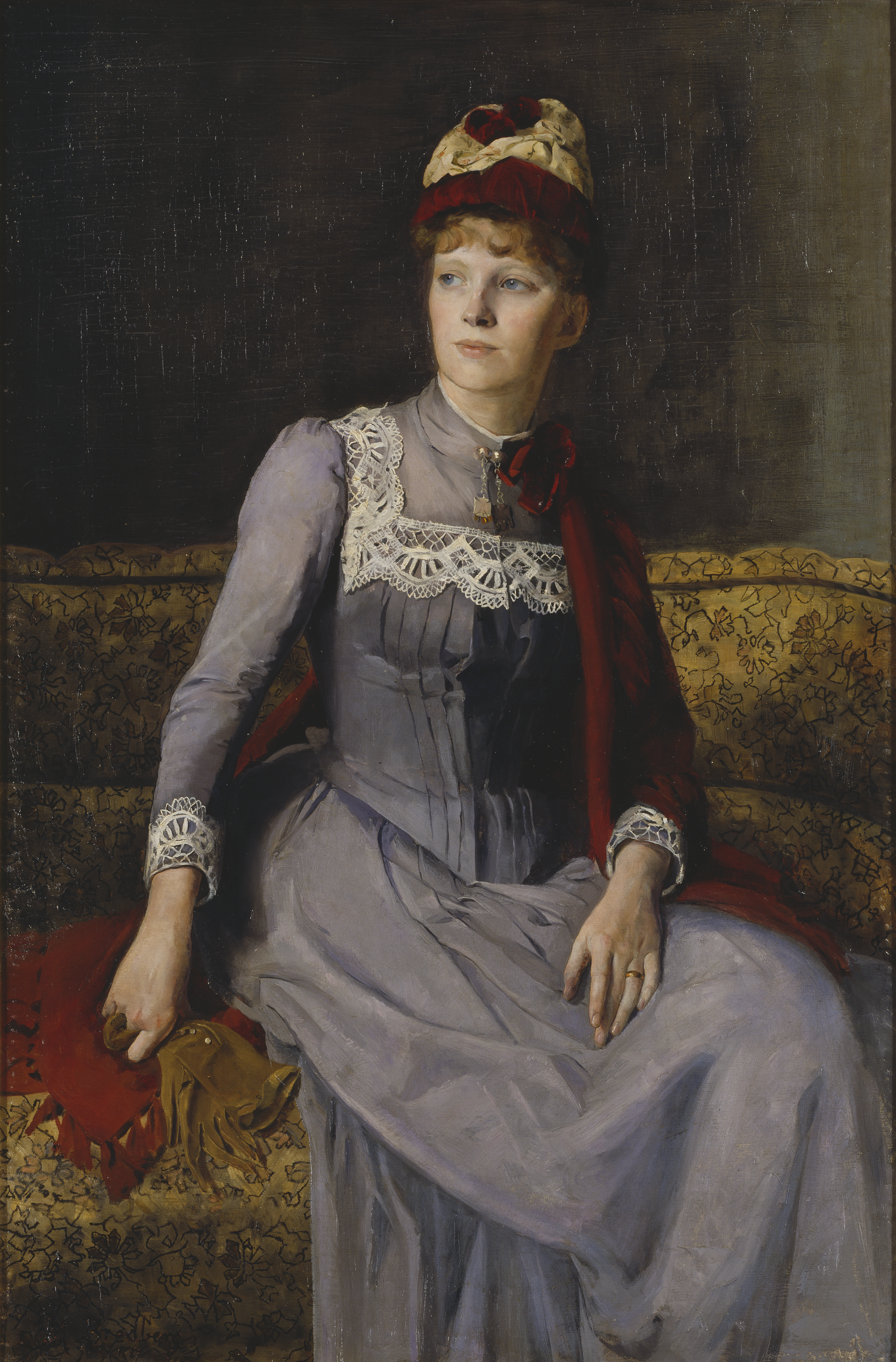
Portrait of Mrs. Anna Flensburg by Mina Carlson-Bredberg, 1887

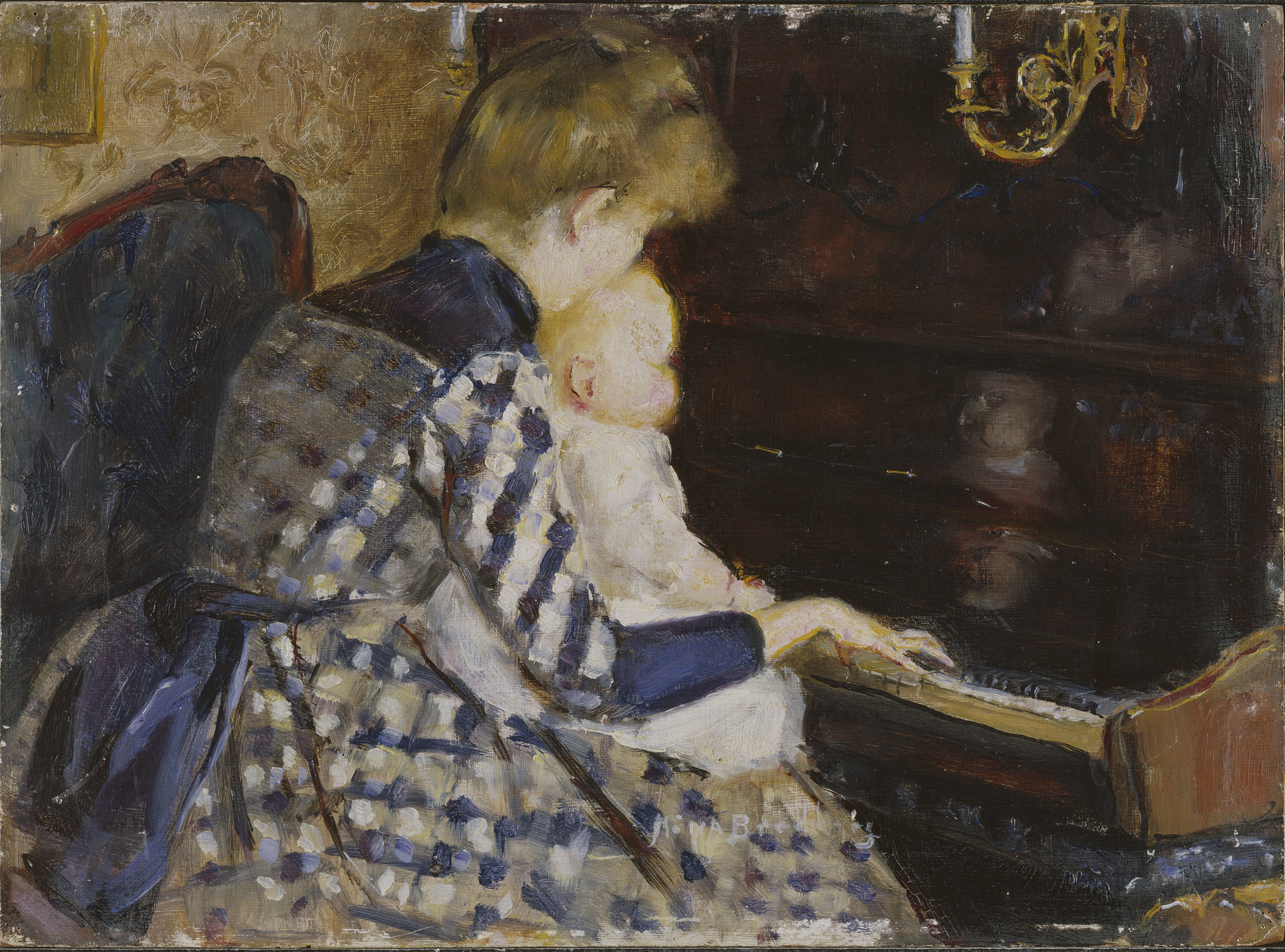
At the Piano by Mina Carlson-Bredberg, 1890

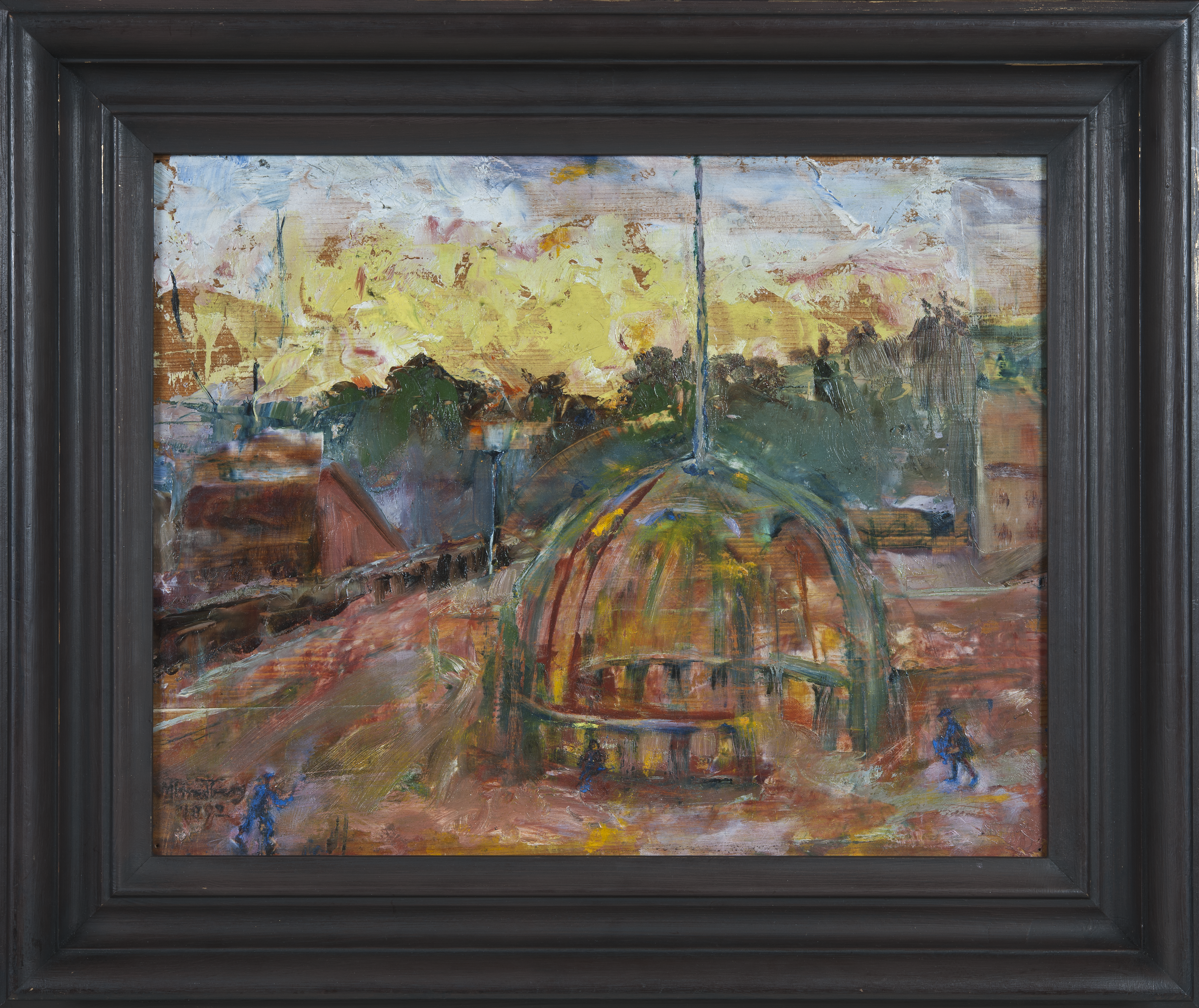
Sunrise in Södertälje by Mina Carlson-Bredberg, 1892

== Portraits of Mina Carlson-Bredberg ==
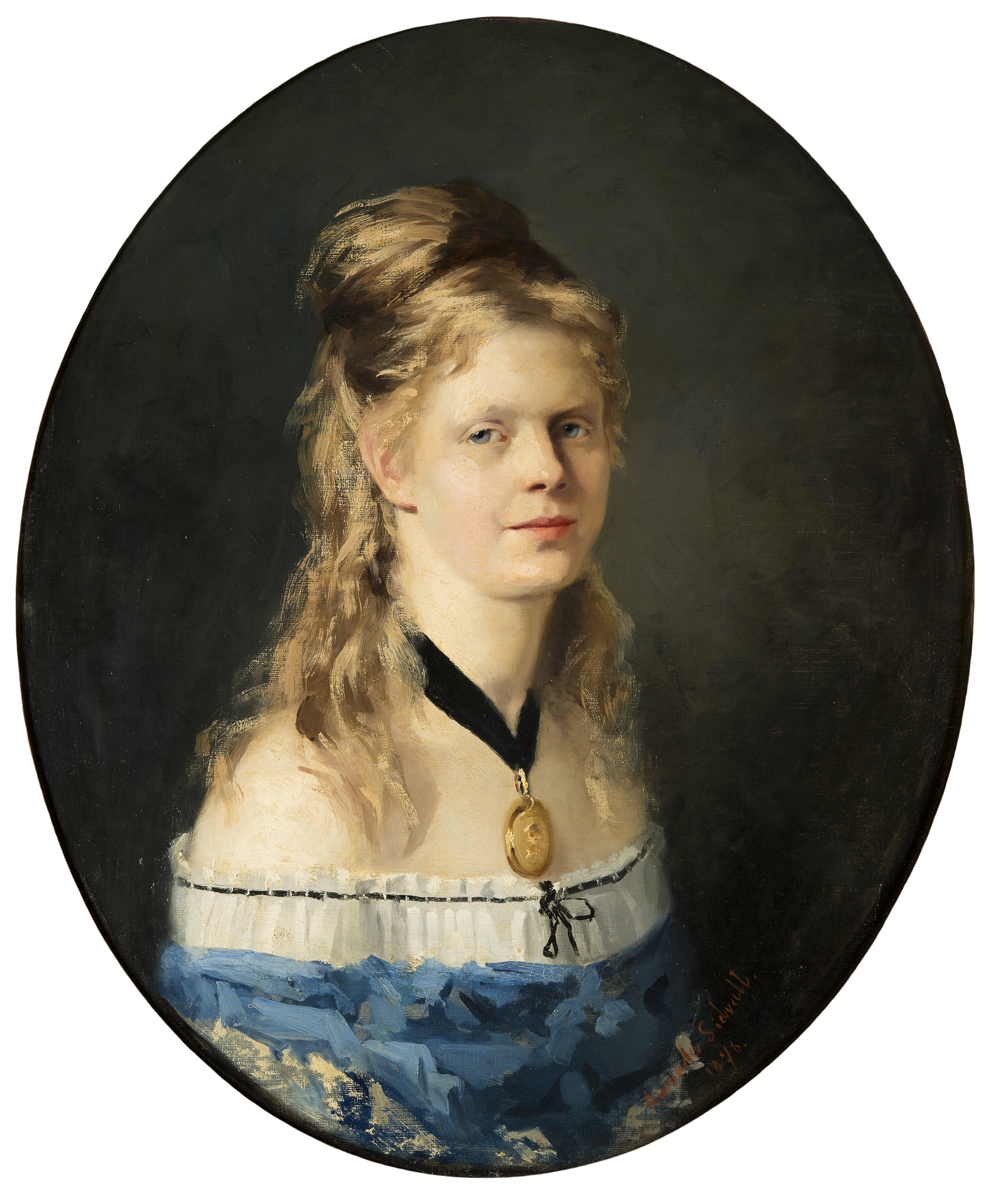
Portrait of Mina Carlson-Bredberg by Amanda Sidwall, 1876

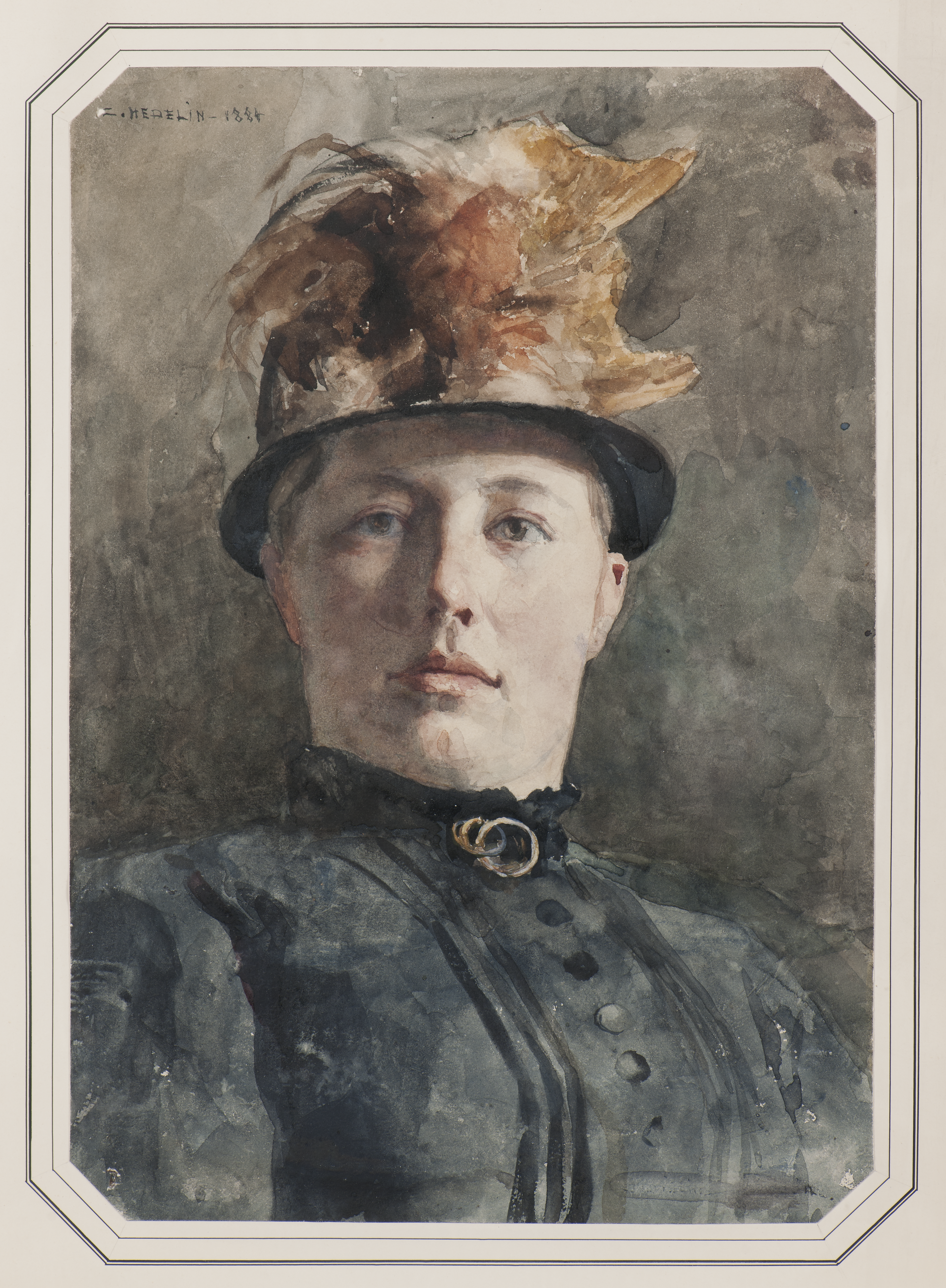
Portrait of Mina Carlson-Bredberg by Carl Hedelin, n.d.

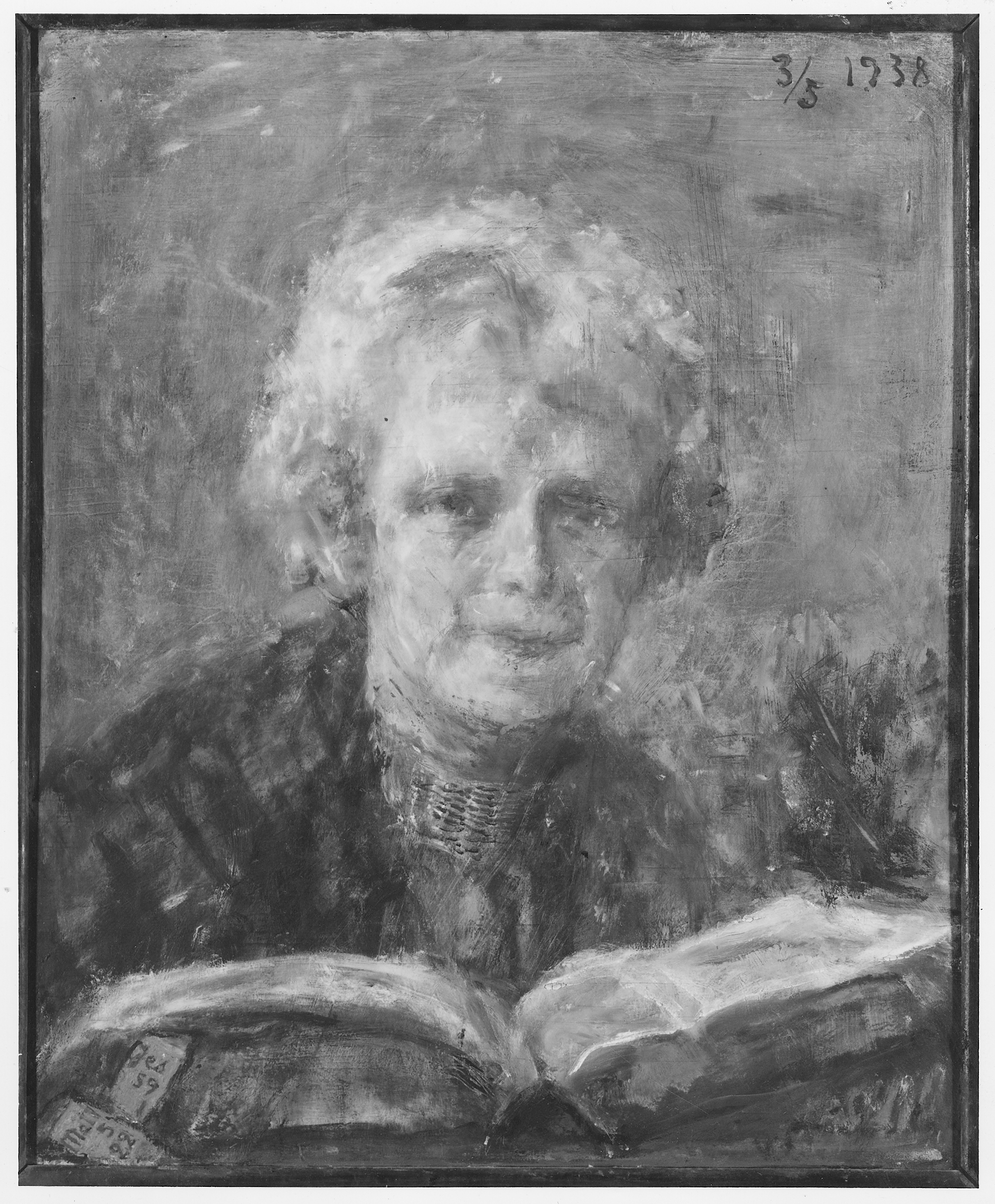
self portrait, 1938
