= Johan Gustaf Sandberg =

Swedish painter (1782–1854)

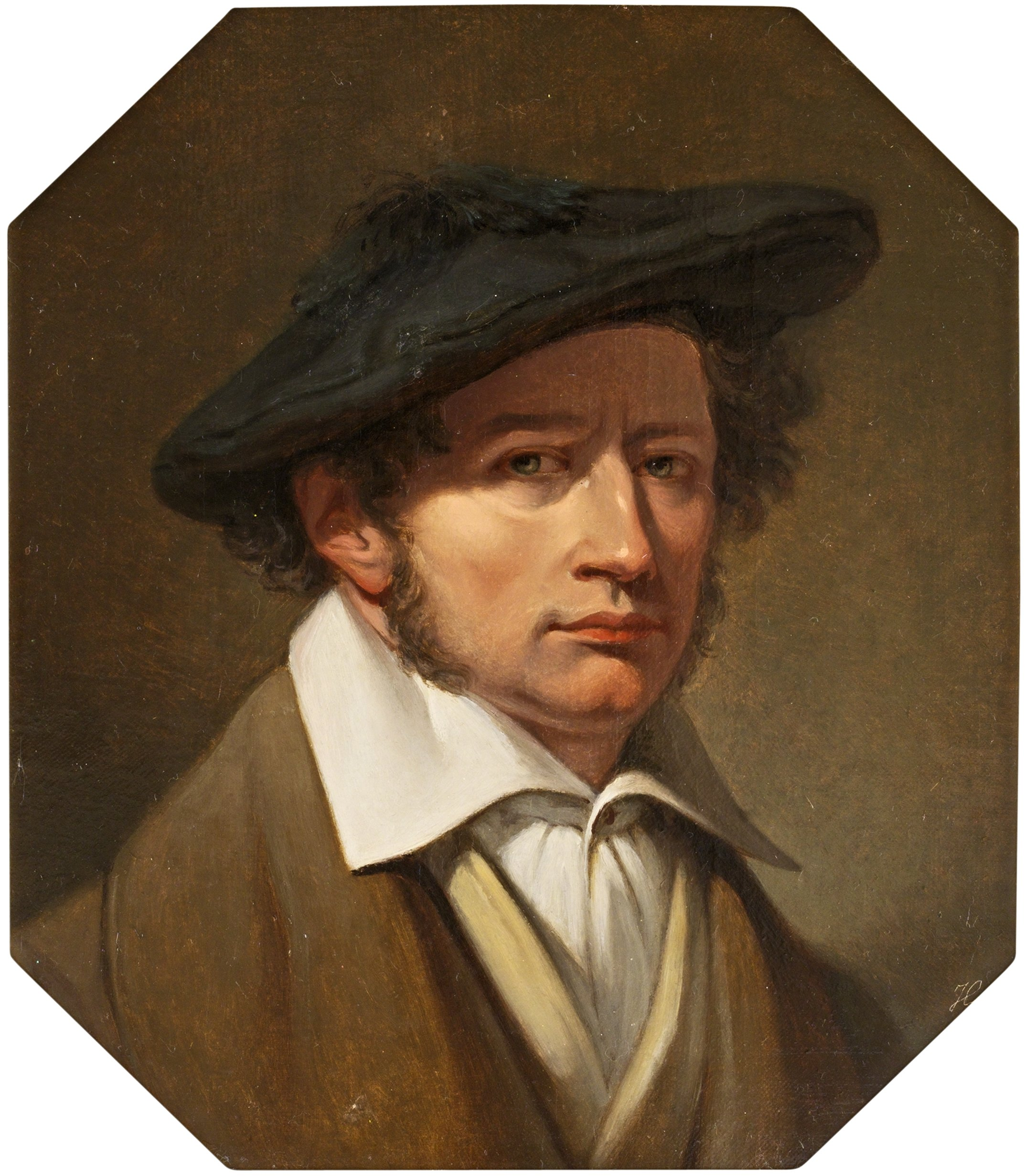
Self-portrait (date unknown)

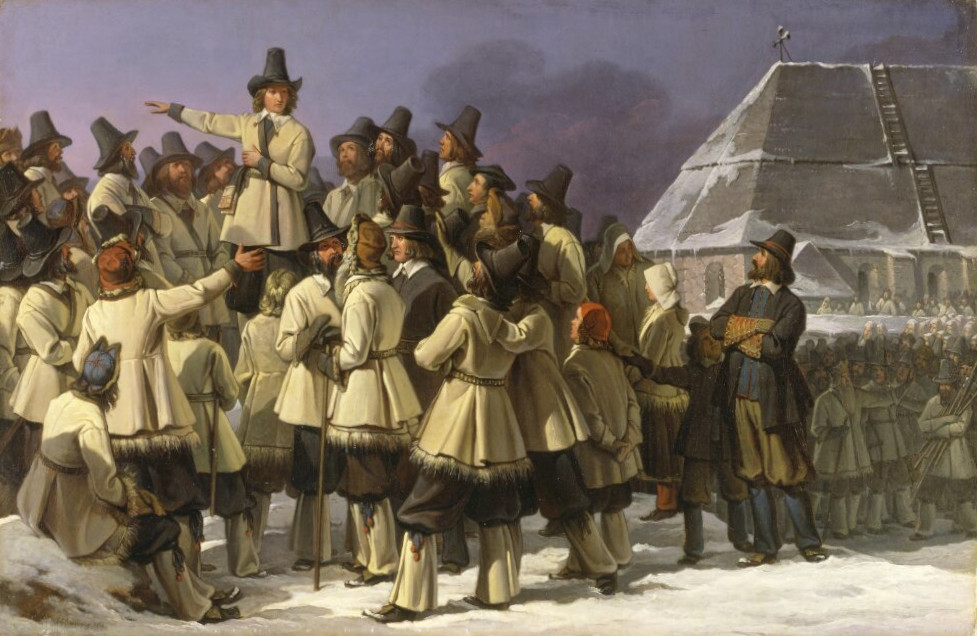
Gustav Vasa Speaks to the Dalecarlians at Mora (1836)

Johan Gustaf Sandberg (13 May 1782 – 26 June 1854) was a Swedish painter. He was foremost a history painter and used settings from Norse mythology and Swedish history. His most widely known work in this area are his frescoes in Uppsala Cathedral that depict the Swedish king Gustav Vasa. In addition to his history paintings, Sandberg painted a number of portraits.

== Biography ==
Sandberg became a student at the Royal Swedish Academy of Arts preparatory school (Konstakademiens principskola) in 1794. After completing his studies there, he moved on to the Academy's antikskola (in which students learned to paint sculptures from ancient history) in 1801. At the same time, Sandberg studied music and learned to play keyboard instruments. He earned money by giving music lessons and by working in the Academy's decoration workshop.

At the Academy in 1808 and 1809, Sandberg competed and won several medals for his history paintings Diana och Endymion and Karl XII och hans sekreterare i Stralsund. It was during these years that he also began experimenting with mythological themes, animal paintings, and portraits. In the time that followed, Sandberg made several more oil paintings that gained him recognition at various shows. He became a ledamot at the Academy in 1821, and an ordinary professor in 1829.

Sandberg served as the director of the Academy from 1845 to 1853. He died on 26 June 1854 in Stockholm. Many of his paintings are located in the National Museum of Fine Arts.
