= White as Snow =

White as Snow may refer to the following:

- white as snow, the color white comparable to snow

== Music ==
- "White as Snow" (song), a 2009 song by U2
- "White As Snow", German: "Weiß wie Schnee", a 2025 song by Sotiria
- "White As Snow" (song), a song by Christian group Maranatha! Singers based on Isaiah 1:18
- "White As Snow" (song), a 2010 song by Haste the Day off the album Attack of the Wolf King
- "White as Snow" (song), a 2014 song by Rivers & Robots off the album All Things New (Rivers & Robots album)
- "White as Snow" (song), a 2015 song by Capsule off the album Wave Runner

== Literature ==
- White As Snow, a 2000 novel by Tanith Lee; see Tanith Lee bibliography
- As White As Snow (Finnish: Valkea kuin lumi), a 2014 novel by Salla Simukka
- White as Snow (Icelandic: Náhvít jörð), a 2021 novel by Lilja Sigurdardottir
- "Wit als sneeuw" (Dutch: White as Snow), a 1975 poem by Nel Benschop

== Other uses ==
- White as Snow (Captain Scarlet and the Mysterons), an episode of Captain Scarlet and the Mysterons
- White as Snow (1948 film), a French comedy film
- White as Snow (2010 film), a Turkish film
- White as Snow (2019 film), a French comedy film

== See also ==
- Snow White (disambiguation)
- As White as in Snow, 2001 Swedish film
- "White as the Driven Snow" (TV episode), a 2014 season 6 number 15 episode 131 of The Mentalist (season 6)
