= Snow White (disambiguation) =

Snow White is a popular fairy tale.

Snow White, Snow White and the Seven Dwarfs, or Schneewittchen may also refer to:

== Films ==
- Snow White (1902 film), a silent film
- Snow White (1916 film), a Players-Lasky Corporation silent film
- Snow-White (1933 film), a Betty Boop cartoon from Fleischer Studios
- Snow White and the Seven Dwarfs (1937 film), a feature animated film produced by Walt Disney
  - Snow White (Disney character)
  - Snow White (franchise)
  - Snow White (2025 film), a live-action remake of the animated film
- Snow White (1952 film), a Mexican comedy
- Snow White (1955 film), a German film by Erich Kobler
- Snow White and the Three Stooges, a 1961 film starring Patricia Medina and Carol Heiss
- Snow White (1961 film), an East German film
- Snow White (1987 film), a musical starring Diana Rigg, Billy Barty, Nicola Stapleton and Sarah Patterson
- Snow White: Happily Ever After, a 1989 unofficial sequel animated film based on the original fairy tale
- Snow White: A Tale of Terror, a 1997 TV horror film starring Sigourney Weaver, Taryn Davis, Monica Keena and Sam Neill
- Snow White: The Fairest of Them All, a 2001 TV fantasy-adventure film starring Kristin Kreuk and Miranda Richardson
- Snow White: The Sequel (Blanche-Neige, la suite), a 2007 animated feature-length film
- Snow White: A Deadly Summer, a 2012 horror film
- Grimm's Snow White, a 2012 fantasy film
- Snow White (Once Upon a Time) (also known as Mary Margaret Blanchard), a character from the ABC television series Once Upon a Time
- Snow White (Shrek), a character in the Shrek film series
- Snow White, a fictional device in the 2006 film Déjà Vu

== Literature ==
=== Fairy tales ===
- "Snow-White and Rose-Red", a German fairy tale
- "Snow-White-Fire-Red", an Italian fairy tale

=== Books ===
- Snow-White, or The House in the Wood, a 1900 novel by Laura E. Richards
- Snow White and the Seven Dwarfs (book), a 1938 book by Wanda Gág
- Snow White (Barthelme novel), 1967, by Donald Barthelme
- Snow White and Rose Red, a 1985 novel by Ed McBain
- Snow White and the Seven Dwarfs, a 1987 novelization of the 1937 film by Suzanne Weyn
- Snow White and Rose Red, a 1989 novel by Patricia Wrede
- Snow White, a 1991 book by Josephine Poole, illustrated by Angela Barrett
- Snow White and Rose Red: A Modern Fairy Tale, a 1997 novel by Regina Doman
- Snow White and the Seven Samurai, a 1999 novel by Tom Holt
- Snow White, a 2004 novelization of the 1937 film by Narinder Dhami

=== Characters ===
- Snow White (Fables), a fictional character in the comic book Fables
- Varda (Middle-earth) or Snow-white, a fictional deity in J. R. R. Tolkien's legendarium

== Music ==
- Snow White and the Seven Dwarfs (soundtrack), a soundtrack album from the 1937 film
- Snow White (album), a 2005 album by Magic Dirt
- Snow White (2025 soundtrack), a soundtrack album from the 2025 live-action remake of the 1937 film
- "Snow White", a song by Streetheart from their eponymous album, 1982
- "Snow White", a song by Christina Grimmie from Side A, 2016
- "Snow White" (song), by Laufey from A Matter of Time, 2025
- Snowhite, original band name of the American metal band Znowhite

== Stage productions ==
- Snow White and the Seven Dwarfs (libretto by Adelheid Wette)
- Snow White and the Seven Dwarfs (1912 play), a Broadway play
- Snow White and the Seven Dwarfs (musical), a 1979 musical based on the 1937 film
- Snow White and the Seven Dwarfs (ballet), a ballet performed by the Placer Theatre Ballet

== Television ==
- The Legend of Snow White, an anime by Tatsunoko Production
- "Snow White and the Seven Dwarfs", an episode of Faerie Tale Theatre
- "Rugrats Tales from the Crib: Snow White", an episode of Rugrats
- "Snow Yellow", an episode of SpongeBob SquarePants

== Other uses ==
- Snow White (horse), a champion standardbred racing horse
- Snow White design language, an industrial design language used by Apple Computer
- Operation Snow White, a 1970s government-infiltration and information-suppression effort by the Church of Scientology
- 225088 Gonggong or Snow White, a trans-Neptunian object
- Hallard White or Snow White, a former All Black and Presidents of Auckland and New Zealand Unions
- Kushiro Snow White, a fictional women ice hockey team in mixed-media project PuraOre! Pride of Orange
- Snow White and the 7 Dwarfs (video game), a 2006 game for the PlayStation 2
- Snow White Sugar, a brand of sugar produced by Hacienda Mercedita in Puerto Rico
- Snövit Hedstierna, a Swedish-born film director, visual artist, performance artist

== See also ==
- Blancanieves, a 2012 Spanish film by Pablo Berger
- Happily Ever After (1993 film), an American animated film
- The Legend of Snow White (Shirayuki Hime no Densetsu), a Japanese anime television series
- Mirror Mirror (film), a 2012 comedy film starring Lily Collins and Julia Roberts
- Schneewittchen (opera), a 1998 opera by Heinz Holliger
- 7 Dwarves – Men Alone in the Wood, a 2004 German comedy
- Snow White and the Huntsman, a 2012 action film starring Kristen Stewart, Sam Claflin, Charlize Theron and Chris Hemsworth
- "Snow White 2", a 1981 episode of The Goodies
- Snow White with the Red Hair (Akagami no Shirayukihime), a Japanese anime television series
- Snowy White, English musician
- White as Snow (disambiguation)
