= Unter dem Eis =

Studio album by Eisblume
- Released: March 6, 2009
- Recorded: 2008–2009
- Genres: Rock; Pop rock Darkwave; Dark rock
- Labels: B1; Universal Music

Eisblume chronology
Unter dem Eis (EP) (2008)	Unter dem Eis (2009)

Singles from Unter dem Eis
- 1. "Eisblumen" Released: January 16, 2009; 2. "Leben ist Schön" Released: April 24, 2009; 3. "Louise" Released: November 6, 2009

Professional ratings
Review scores
Source	Rating
CDStarts.de	5.5/10 stars

Unter dem Eis is the debut album by German band Eisblume. It was released by B1 Recordings/Universal Music. It reached twelve on the German album charts while it peaked at twenty-four on the Austrian album charts.

On January 16, 2009, Eisblume released their debut single "Eisblumen" (German for "Frost Flowers"), a cover of Subway to Sally's song originally released in 2005. This version, which was produced by Ingo Politz of Valicon, reached number three on the German singles charts and went on to become the 43rd best-selling single of 2009 in Germany. The song's video also earned the band a nomination for the "Best National Video" at the 2009 ECHO awards. They were also nominated for three VIVA Comet awards in 2009: "Best Newcomers", Best Online Star" and "Best Video".

The second single released from the album, "Leben ist Schön" (German for "Life is Beautiful"), peaked at number 18, and helped their album to return to the Top 20 of the German album charts when it was released in April 2009. Their third single "Louise", a cover version of a Bell, Book & Candle song translated into German, was released in November 2009 and peaked at twenty-nine. The song helped them to earn their second and third ECHO award nominations for "Best National Video" and "Best National Newcomer" in 2010.

== Standard edition ==
No.	Title	Length
1.	"Dämmerung - Intro (Dawn)"	1:20
2.	"Eisblumen (Frost flowers)"	3:45
3.	"Zeit bleibt nicht stehen (Time does not stand)"	3:27
4.	"Leben ist Schön (Life is Beautiful)"	3:38
5.	"Überleben (Survive)"	3:55
6.	"Land in Sicht (Land ahoy)"	4:15
7.	"Hoffnung (Hope)"	4:24
8.	"Zeit zu gehen (Time to go)"	4:16
9.	"Stern (Star)"	3:35
10.	"Liebe heißt Schmerz (Love means Pain)"	3:17
11.	"Sieben mal (Seven times)"	3:42
12.	"Unter dem Eis (Under the Ice)"	4:12
13.	"Louise"	3:32
14.	"Eisblumen (Frost Flowers)" (music video)	3:45

=== Re-release ===
No.	Title	Length
14.	"Licht im Ozean (Light in the ocean)"	3:57
15.	"Das Meer (The sea)"	3:51
16.	"Dunkle Sehnsucht (Dark desire)"	3:21

== Chart performance ==
Year	Album	Chart positions		
Year	Album	GER	AUT	SWI
2009	Unter Dem Eis: Formats: CD, digital download	12	24	-

Singles

Year	Title	Chart Positions		
Year	Title	GER	AUT	SWI
2009	"Eisblumen"	3	25	97
2009	"Leben Ist Schön"	18	55	-
2009	"Louise"	29	-	-
