= Helene Billgren =

Swedish artist

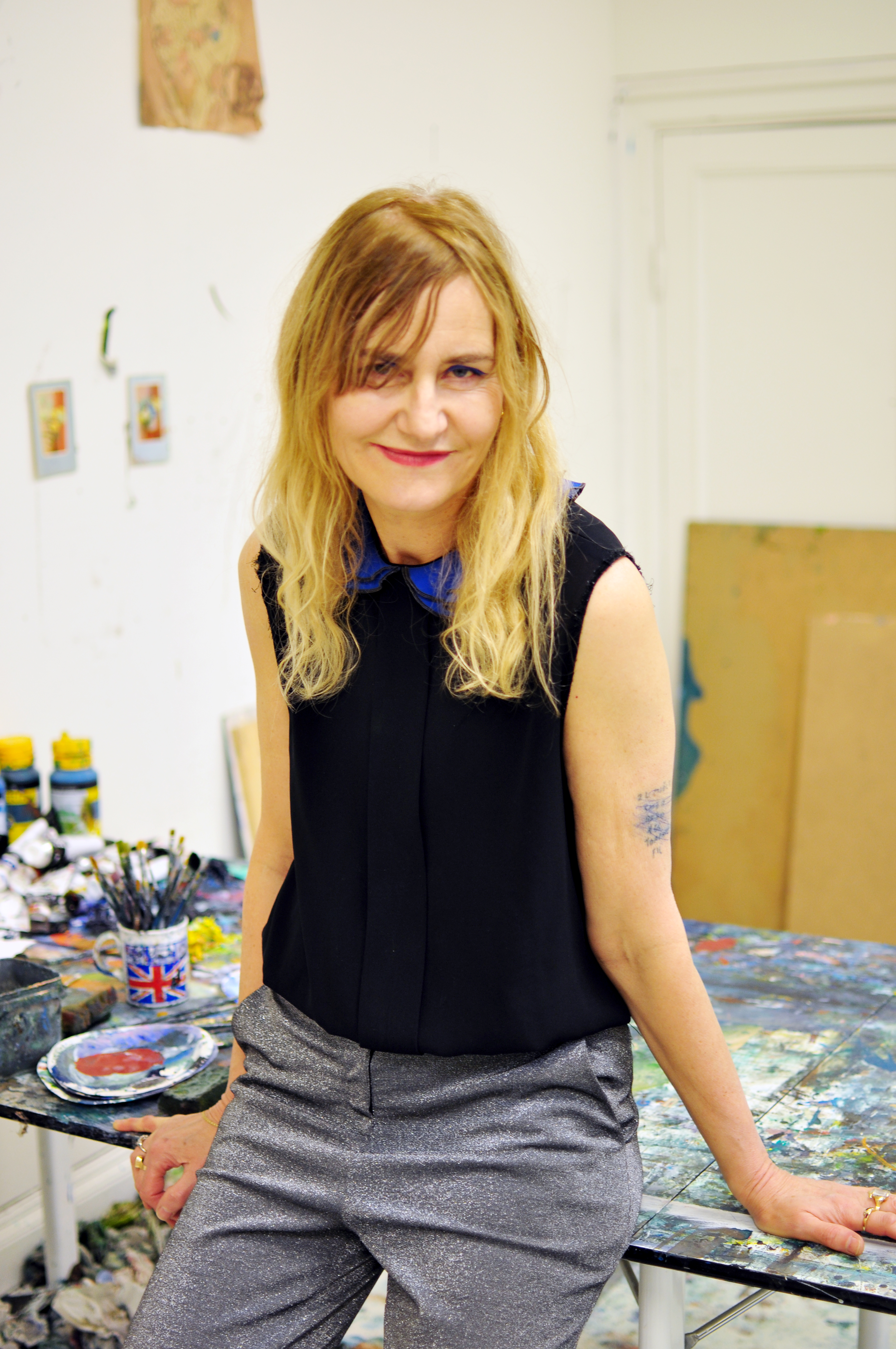
Helene Billgren, 2013

Helene Elisabeth Billgren (née Åberg; born 1 June 1952) is a Swedish artist. Helene Åberg was born in Norrköping.She has previously been married to Ernst Billgren, and their daughter is Elsa Billgren.

She studied at the Valand Academy of Fine Arts, Gothenburg.
