= Annika Ekdahl =

Swedish textile artist (born 1955)

- Born: Annika Ekdahl; 1955 (age 70–71); Stockholm, Sweden
- Occupations: artist, weaver, tapestry design
- Years active: 1978-present
- Website: www.annikaekdahl.se

Annika Ekdahl (born 1955 in Stockholm, Sweden) is a textile artist who designs tapestries marrying Renaissance and Baroque practice with more modern techniques, creating large-scale works in her own contemporary style. She has exhibited in Europe and Australia and was the 2013 Nordic Textiles Awardee.

== Biography ==
Annika Ekdahl was born in 1955 in Stockholm, Sweden where she spent her childhood. From 1978, she developed an interest in working with textiles. In the early 1980s, she moved to Blekinge and obtained a master's degree in textile art in 1994 from the HDK School of Design and Crafts of the University of Gothenburg. She was a lecturer at Blekinge Institute of Technology (2002–08) and an adjunct professor at HDK (2008–11).

Ekdahl's preferred art form is tapestry design. Having studied Renaissance methods, she employs classical techniques to create large-scale works depicting people and situations from her own life. Her works can take up to one and one-half years to complete as she weaves contemporary imagery of animals, people, places into her narrative designs. She describes the process as much like writing a novel, weaving the story with traditional methods but utilizing a modern approach including digital techniques.

Between 2000 and 2006, she worked on five pieces creating a series she called The Baroque Party. The works were included in an exhibition which was displayed in Kalmar Castle, Ronneby Cultural Center, Västerås Art Museum and Dalslands Museum of Art. Each of the individual pieces has now been purchased: the title piece, “The Baroque Party” (2000) belongs to the Röhsska Museum, Gothenburg; “The Wedding In Queens” (2002) is owned by the National Public Arts Council and is exhibited at Uppsala University'; “Darlings” (2003) was bought by the Falkenberg Municipality; “The Theatre In The Park” (2006) was purchased by Värmlands Museum in Karlstad; and “Definitely Gold” (2008) belongs to the Västra Götaland Regional Council. Ekdahl has traveled through Europe studying tapestries, visited Poland to study the world-famous Wawel Castle tapestries in Kraków and worked in Australia where she has exhibited at the Maitland Art Gallery in New South Wales.

In February 2013 at the Abecita Art Museum in Borås, Ekdahl received the Nordic Award in Textiles, an honor that granted her not only a substantial monetary award, but also earned her a visiting professorship at University of Gothenburg. The same year in November, she was awarded the prestigious Prince Eugen Medal for her outstanding tapestries. In 2015 she unveiled the two tapestries she has been making since the award, Follow Me. Shine, which is about discovery and perception and Follow Me. Grow, about growth and development. They were both installed at the University of Oslo in 2015.
