= Weiß wie Schnee =

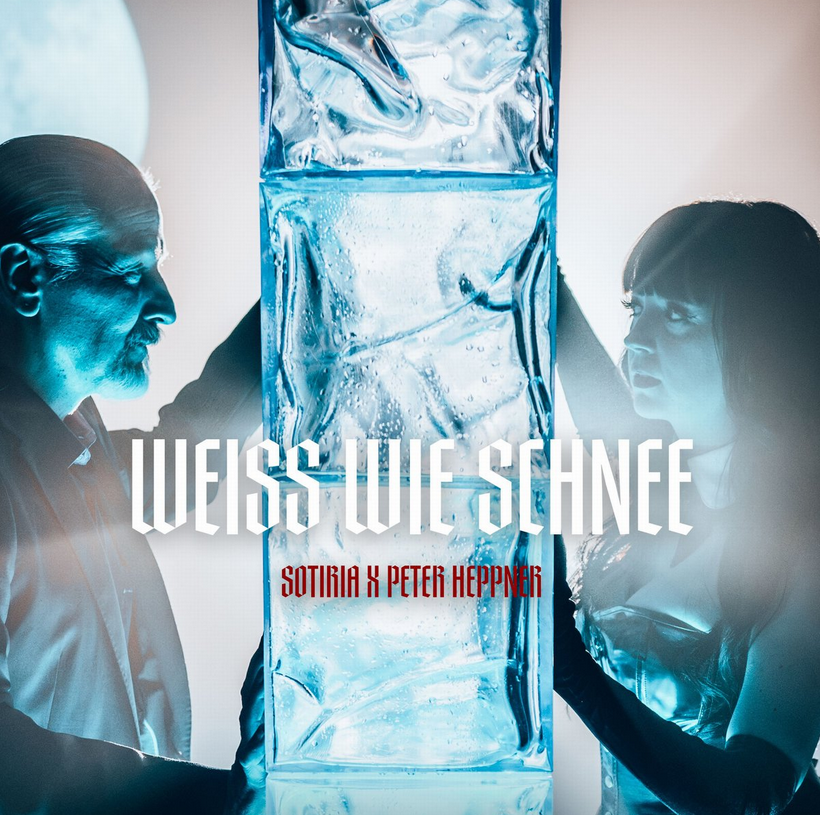

Song by Sotiria feat. Peter Heppner

from the album Meine Liebe ist Gift
- Released: 17 January 2025
- Genre: Dark pop, symphonic metal
- Label: Sony Music
- Songwriters: Justin Balk, Rupert Keplinger, Sotiria Schenk
- Producers: Jochen Seibert, Henning Publishers

"Weiß wie Schnee" (lit. 'White as Snow') is a song by German pop-rock singer Sotiria, released on 17 January 2025, in collaboration with German synth-pop musician Peter Heppner. The track is the third single released from her third studio album, "Meine Liebe ist Gift".

== Origin and artwork ==
The song was written by Sotiria herself, together with co-writers Justin Balk and Rupert Keplinger. Keplinger was also responsible for the instrumentation, playing bass and guitar. While Keplinger had already co-written the song Heute Nacht for Sotiria's previous album Mein Herz (September 2021), she worked with Balk for the first time on the production of the album Meine Liebe ist Gift. Regarding the collaboration with the two, she said: "we harmonized extremely well together and we worked out the songs together in an amazingly short time". The mixing and production were done by Henning Verlage from Münsterland, with whom Sotiria has regularly collaborated since her debut album, Hallo Leben (2018). He received support in the production from Jochen Seibert (Noel Pix), with whom Sotiria had worked for the first time, but who had already done a remix of Just One Word (TanzZwang) for Heppner in 2018. The mastering was done by 24–96 Mastering in Karlsruhe, under the direction of studio owner Robin Schmidt.

The front cover of the single features Peter Heppner and Sotiria, along with the artist name and song title. It shows the two facing each other, separated by a wall of ice. The photograph was taken by co-writer Keplinger during the filming of the accompanying music video.

== Publication and promotion ==
The first release of "Weiß wie Schnee" was as a single on 17 January 2025. It was released as a digital single track for download and streaming by Ariola (catalog number: 19687269392). While Sony Music Entertainment was responsible for distribution, the song was published by Angry Dog Publishing, Balk und Söhne Musikverlag, and Lucile-Meisel Musikverlag. On 14 February 2025, the song was released as the third single from Sotiria's third studio album, Meine Liebe ist Gift (catalog number: 19802870862).

The collaboration between Sotiria and Peter Heppner was first announced in December 2024, following a report in Sonic Seducer. On January 5, 2025, the singer presented a 30-second teaser on her YouTube page. The song was available for pre-sale from 12 January 2025. After the album Meine Liebe ist Gift was released, the song was featured in a promotional trailer during the release week, which was broadcast by ProSiebenSat.1 Media, among others.

== Background ==
Sotiria's band project Eisblume (2008–2013) and her first two solo albums, Hallo Leben (October 2018) and Mein Herz (September 2021), were, according to her own statement, created under the external influence of record companies and producers. With the production of the album Meine Liebe ist Gift, she says she finally went her own way: "The whole album feels like a liberation for me; finally, I can fully follow my feelings for the songs, and no one tells me that any song or lyric is too dark."

The song premiered live on 30 September 2023, during a performance in Fulda, when Sotiria was a guest on Nino de Angelo's From Eternity to Eternity tour. There, as throughout the entire tour (11 concerts) until 15 October 2023, she presented her two new songs, Schwarzer Diamant and Weiß wie Schnee.

During an interview, Sotiria stated that the song was conceived as a duet from the beginning. She had always loved Heppner's voice and felt it was a perfect fit. She was "extremely" pleased that he agreed to participate. In his over 35-year career, he had recorded very few songs that he hadn't co-written. Furthermore, he was known for spending months perfecting a single song lyric. According to Sotiria, he didn't want to change a single word, even though she had given him complete creative freedom. She also stated that she was proud of her lyrics, but especially proud that Heppner hadn't wanted to alter anything and had enhanced the song with his "unparalleled, exceptional voice".

== Composition ==
Weiß wie Schnee. Rot wie Blut. Wir sind Verschworene für alle Zeiten. Durch den Regen. Durch die Flut. Wirst du mich für immer begleiten. — Refrain, original excerpt	The lyrics to "Weiß wie Schnee" are in German. The music and lyrics were composed and written jointly by Justin Balk, Rupert Keplinger, and Sotiria Schenk. Musically, the song falls within the realms of electronic music, metal, and pop music ; stylistically, it falls within the realms of dark pop and symphonic metal, with influences from Nu metal. he piece was composed in F-sharp minor at 186 beats per minute. The song's content is about unity ("No one will ever separate us, no matter what happens") and secrecy ("Seven times we have sworn our loyalty"). The song describes an unbreakable bond between two people who are meant for each other, whether in love or deep friendship. It tells of promises that will endure beyond all adversity. The song is structured with two verses and a refrain. It begins with the first verse, written as a quatrain with two cross rhymes. This is followed by the so-called pre-chorus , consisting of two lines, before the actual refrain begins with its seven lines. Up to this point, only Sotiria can be heard. The same structure is repeated with the second verse, but this one is sung by Heppner. From the second refrain onward, Heppner and Sotiria sing a duet, which also marks the end of the song. However, the main part of the duet is presented in an extended version, or rather, it is repeated twice, with the first repetition serving as a bridge.

== Music video ==
The music video for "Weiß wie Schnee" was filmed in December 2024 at Cinegate Studios in Hamburg and premiered on YouTube on 17 January 2025. It depicts the two protagonists – in a dark night, illuminated by moonlight – separated by a huge wall of ice in a snowstorm, gazing longingly at each other and giving free rein to their feelings. From about halfway through the video, the two protagonists are also seen more frequently in scenes together. The video ends with the two standing side by side in front of a red-lit sky, as the camera slowly pulls away from them. The total length of the video is 3:19 minutes. It was directed by Berlin filmmaker Marcel Brell.

== Contributors ==
Song production: Justin Balk: Composition, lyricist; Peter Heppner: Singer; Rupert Keplinger: Bass, Guitar, Composition, Lyrics; Sotiria Schenk: vocals, composition, lyrics; Robin Schmidt: Mastering; Jochen Seibert (Noel Pix): Music Production; Henning Verlage: Mixing, Music Production; Music video: Bojana Bogdanov: Producer; Marcel Brell: Director; Christina Bruns: Hair, Makeup; Luka Over: Lighting Assistant	Cover design: Rupert Keplinger: Photographer; Record label: 24–96 Mastering: Recording studio; Angry Dog Publishing: Music publisher; Ariola: Music publisher; Balk und Söhne Musikverlag: Music publisher; Lucile-Meisel Musikverlag: Music publisher; Sony Music Entertainment: Distribution

== Reception ==
The reviewer from Monkeypress described "White as Snow " as an emotional duet and a "highlight" from Sotiria's album *My Love Is Poison*. He noted a magical harmony between Sotiria and Peter Heppner, in which the singer showcased her versatility. The song thrives on its mystical depth and Heppner's distinctive voice, which harmonizes perfectly with Sotiria's soulful vocals. The reviewer found it particularly impressive that Heppner was so taken with the lyrics that he didn't suggest any changes—rare praise that underscores his appreciation. The accompanying set design featured a breathtaking backdrop with a gigantic ice wall, moonlight, and snow flurries. The scenes in which Heppner and Sotiria perform through the ice wall are a striking visual highlight.

Kevin Drewes of Schlagerpuls described Weiß wie Schnee as a “dark electronic new metal headbanger”. A reviewer from Sonic Seducer called it an interesting alloy between dark electronica and symphonic metal.

The music magazine Medienkonverter described the collaboration between Heppner and Sotiria as a "snowdrop in the music scene." The reviewer believes that this collaboration, even on paper, seems like the perfect musical blizzard. Sotiria, with her crystal-clear, almost fairytale-like voice, meets Heppner, whose dark timbre has been a guaranteed source of goosebumps for decades. The combination of Sotiria's gentle, almost ethereal vocals and Heppner's unmistakable, profound voice has the potential to unleash an emotional blizzard that strikes right to the heart, even when it's bitterly cold outside.
