= Elsa Billgren =

Swedish television presenter and fashion blogger

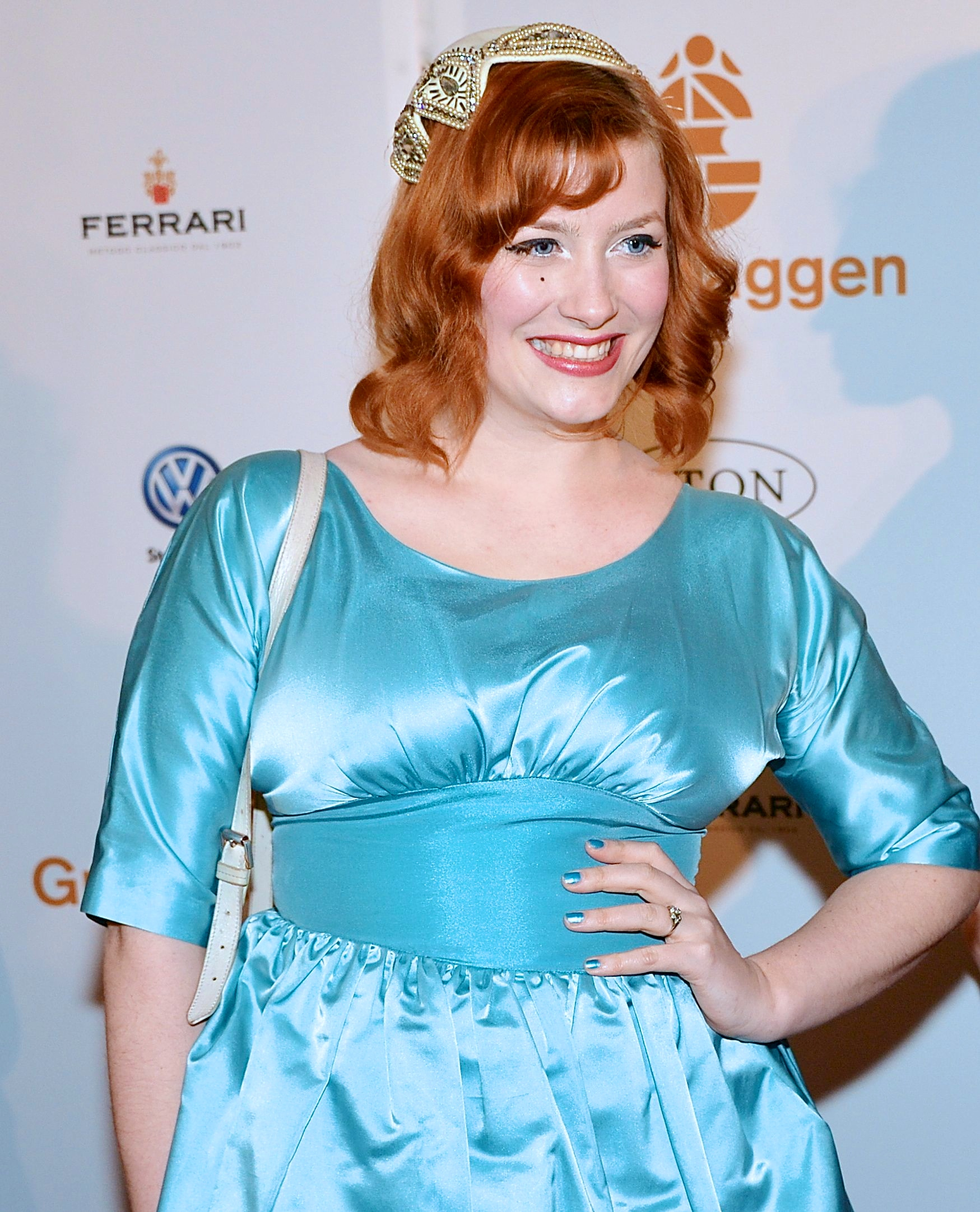
- Elsa Billgren (2013)
- Born: 1 February 1986 (age 39); Gothenburg, Sweden
- Occupation: Television presenter
- Known for: Fashion blogger

Elsa Billgren (born 1 February 1986) is a Swedish television presenter and fashion blogger. She has presented many television shows on ZTV, SVT and TV4, and has hosted radio shows for Sveriges Radio. Billgren has also written and published a non-fiction book and a novel.

== Career ==
Billgren began working for the television channel ZTV immediately after high school; she was a reporter and television presenter. Between 2006 and 2009 she was a presenter there for the entertainment shows Uppladdat and Cocobäng. In 2009, she presented Mega at Barnkanalen and Rec on SVT1. In 2010, she presented Antikdeckarna at the now defunct channel TV4 Plus. Billgren was the presenter for the web broadcasts at SVT's website during Melodifestivalen 2011, and the "After the show" programme Melodfestivalen 2011: Eftersnack on SVT. Also in 2011, she presented the radio show Hallå i P3 at Sveriges Radio P3 and the SVT comedy show Har du hört den förut?. On 20 July 2012, she was the host of one episode of Sommar i P1 and later the same year participated in Sommarpratarna at SVT. Later in 2012, she became a decorator on the home improvement show Äntligen hemma at TV4.

Billgren is a fashion and decoration blogger on the Elle website. She has published two books: Elsa Billgrens vintage (2013) and in November 2013 her first novel, Man kan vinka till varandra från balkongerna.

== Personal life ==
Billgren is the daughter of artist and writer Ernst Billgren and artist Helene Billgren.
