= Úlfur Karlsson =

Icelandic film producer

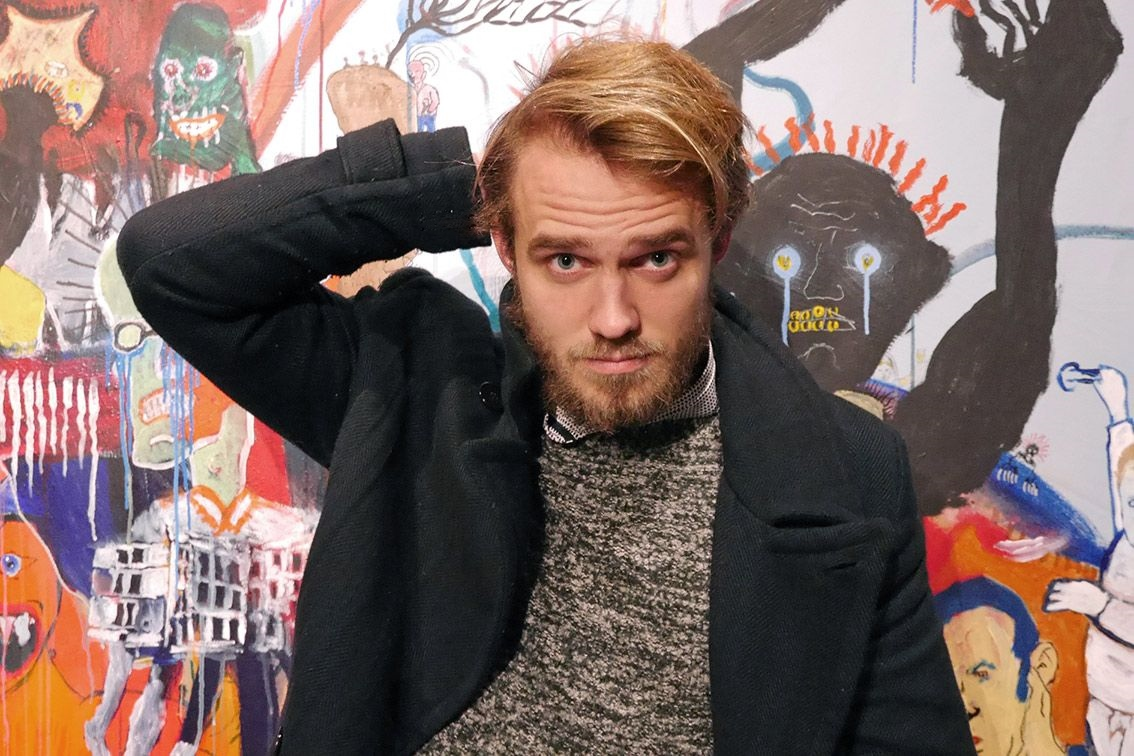
- Born: Úlfur Karlsson; 13 October 1988 (age 37); Gothenburg, Sweden
- Known for: Artist, painter, film director

Úlfur Karlsson (born 13 October 1988) is an Icelandic artist and film director.

== Life and career ==
Úlfur Karlsson was born on 12 October 1988 in Sweden and started his career making short films and documentaries. In 2003 his short film Pirovat was screened at the New York Independent Film and Video Festival. In 2008 he graduated from the National film Institute of Iceland (Icelandic Film School). Úlfur has made two short films since Pirovat; Tvísaga, in 2006, and Einskonar Alaska (Kind of Alaska), in 2008, based on a radio play by Harold Pinter.

In 2009 he graduated from art school at Akureyri (Myndlistarskólinn á Akureyri). After that he enrolled in Valand School of Fine Arts and graduated with BA degree. At Valand he started painting in Neo-expressionistic style. Úlfur has had various exhibitions in Iceland, for example at Listasafn ASÍ, Slunkaríki in Ísafjörður, Sláturhúsið, and Egilsstaðir. In 2015, Úlfur, along with other young artists from Iceland, took part in an exhibition called Nýmálað (Just Painted) at Listasafn Reykjavíkur. The same year he had a solo exhibition at Listasafn Reykjavíkur, titled Við erum ekki hrædd (We are not afraid) and in March–April 2016 one named Implant at Wind and Weather Gallery( Reykjavík). In 2017, he had a solo exhibition at the Reykjanesbær Art Museum titled Úlfur við girðinguna (Wolf at the fence) which was inspired by the fence that separated the US Naval Air Station Keflavik from the general population. In 2019 the artist had a solo exhibition at Galerie Hilger NEXT in Vienna, titled Ominvores .

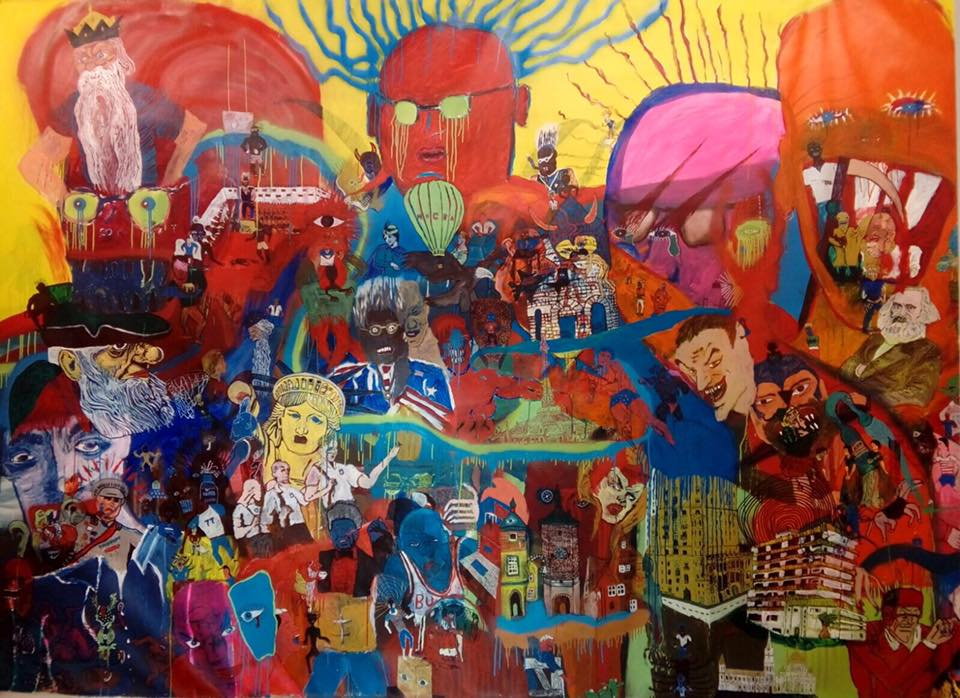
By Proxy (2016)

== Short films ==
- Pirovat 2003
- Tvísaga 2006
- Einskonar Alaska 2008

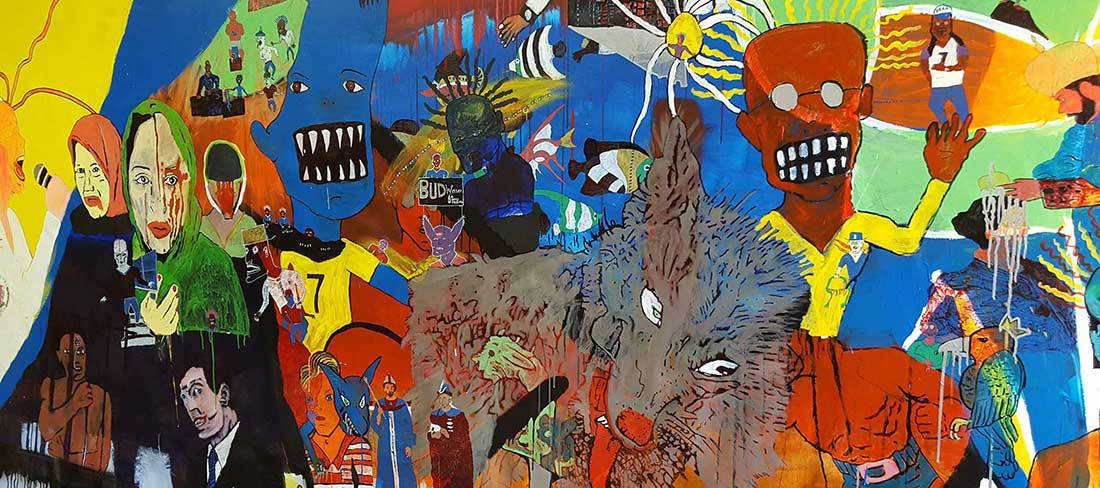
By Proxy II (2016)
