= Gabo Camnitzer =

Swedish-U.S. artist, teacher and musician

Gabo Camnitzer (born 1984) is a Swedish and U.S. artist, pedagogue, and musician.

== Life and work ==
Using installation, sculpture, drawing and pedagogical interventions, Camnitzer's work focuses on questions surrounding childhood, subject formation, and socialization. Camnitzer has said that his interest in early childhood is in parted inspired by his experience with middle ear effusion as a small child, which led to significant hearing loss and language-learning difficulties in his early life.

Having worked as an elementary school teacher, Camnitzer often draws on collaborative and anti-hierarchical forms of education to engage groups in explorations of experimental knowledge forms. In 2016 Camnitzer initiated the artistic research project titled, Meaning Machine, at the Royal Institute of Art in Stockholm, focusing on the performativity of children. The project was supervised by the educational researcher Liselott Mariette Olsson.

Other projects of Camnitzer have explored the assimilationist educational practices of charter schools in New York City (The Student Body); the problematic origins of developmental psychology (in collaboration with the architect, Lluís Alexandre Casanovas Blanco); and the connection between aesthetic abstraction and epistemological abstraction (Evil Shapes).

Camnitzer attended the Whitney Museum's Independent Study Program and Valand Academy, University of Gothenburg, Sweden, where he studied with Esther Shalev-Gerz. After graduating from Valand Academy, Camnitzer worked as an assistant to the Brazilian artist, Cildo Meireles.

Camnitzer is Assistant Professor of Social Practice and Director of Foundations at University of Massachusetts Dartmouth. He has previously held teaching positions at Columbia University, Valand Academy, University of Gothenburg, and Gerlesborg School of Fine Art. Camnitzer sits on the editorial board of Sweden's oldest art journal, Paletten.

Camnitzer is the son of Uruguayan conceptual artist Luis Camnitzer, and political scientist, Selby Hickey.

== Exhibitions ==
- Queens Museum, New York
- Bonniers Konsthall, Stockholm, Sweden
- Malmö Konsthall, Sweden
- Netherland Flemish Institute, Cairo, Egypt
- Kunstnernes Hus, Oslo, Norway
- Nurture Art, New York
- Artists Space, New York
- GfZK Leipzig, Germany
- Tenthaus, Oslo, Norway
- 11th Mercosul Visual Arts Biennial, Porto Alegre, Brazil
- Västerås Art Museum, Sweden
- Gertrude Contemporary Art Center, Melbourne;
- Exit Art, New York;
- El Basilisco, Buenos Aires
- Kunstsaele, Berlin;
- Göteborg Konsthall, Sweden;
- Museo Blanes, Montevideo, Uruguay.

== Music ==
Camnitzer was the frontman of the Gothenburg-based band, Gabo and the Wartels. As Oma 333 label head and Stockholm based concert promoter, Gavin Maycroft describes it: “Gabo and the Wartels started in May 2007 when Gabo Camnitzer, an artist and musician came across a family playing marching band music on the side of the street in Gothenburg. The family band was made up of a girl, Georgia (b.1995), playing bass drum, her father, Jonny Wartel (b.1959), playing sax, and her cousin, Andreas (b.1984), playing snare. Gabo approached the Wartels and proposed a collaboration. The band was formed in the basement of the Valand Academy two days later and the week after that they were on stage supporting Deerhoof.”

The group went on to record several EPs and an album, touring the US and Scandinavia. They released In a Very Small Boat, on the label Oma 333 in 2013. Camnitzer also founded the band Glenn and Glenn with Markus Görsch of Love Is All (band), self-releasing a record in 2010, and an EP on Swedish imprint, Zeon Light in 2013. Camnitzer played guitar in the band Love Is All (band) on tours across the US and Europe in 2009 and 2010.
