= Ernst Billgren =

Swedish artist and writer

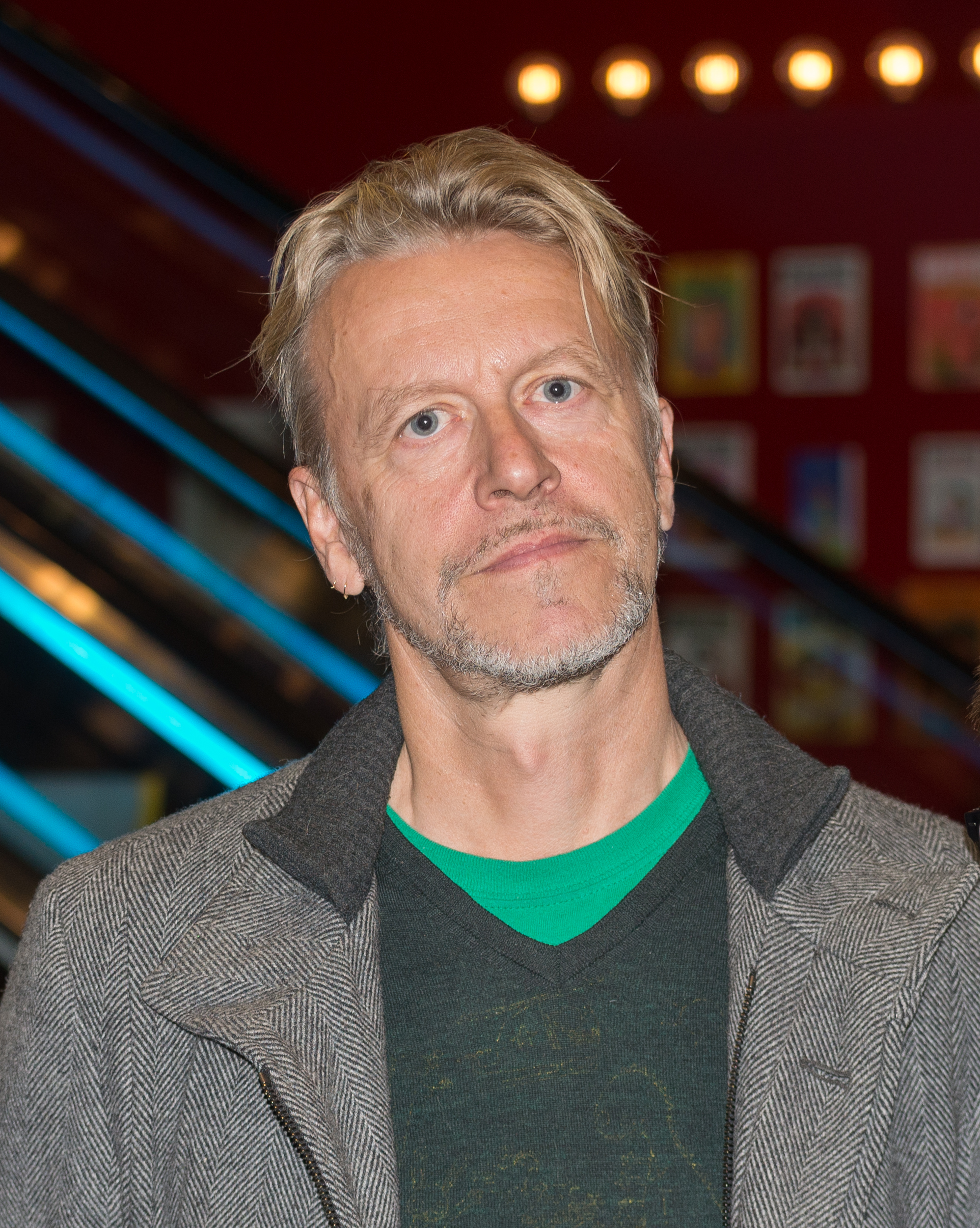
Ernst Billgren.

Ernst Billgren (born 18 November 1957) is a Swedish artist and writer.

Billgren was born in Stockholm and that is where he is currently based. He attended the Valand School of Fine Arts where he graduated in 1987.

His daughter Elsa Billgren is a television presenter. He was previously married to artist Helene Billgren.

== Gallery ==
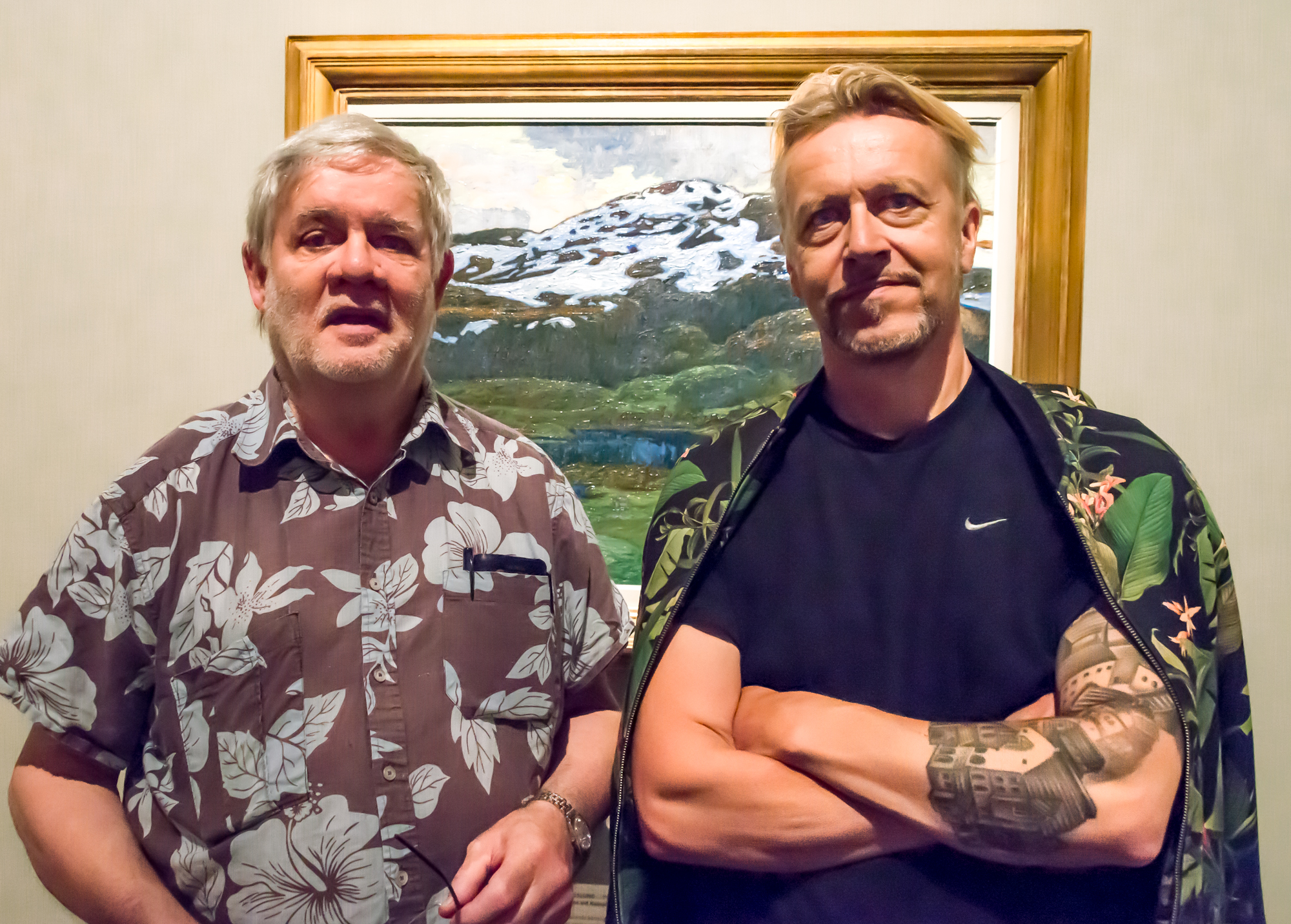
Carl Johan De Geer and Ernst Billgren at the exhibition "100 Fantastic Paintings" at the Academy of Fine Arts in Stockholm 2015.

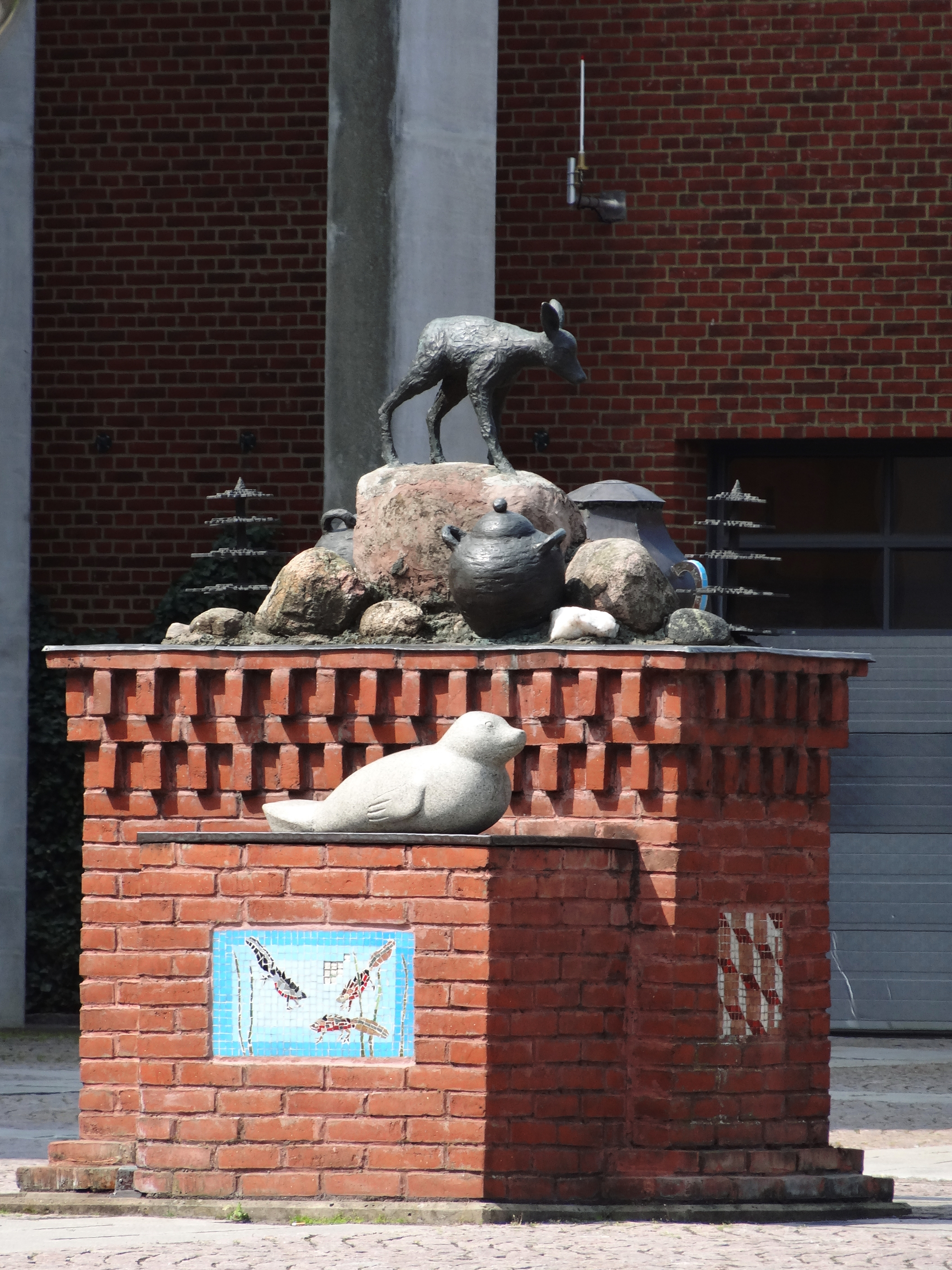
Meeting place (1995) sculpture group located outside the emergency at Sahlgrenska Hospital.

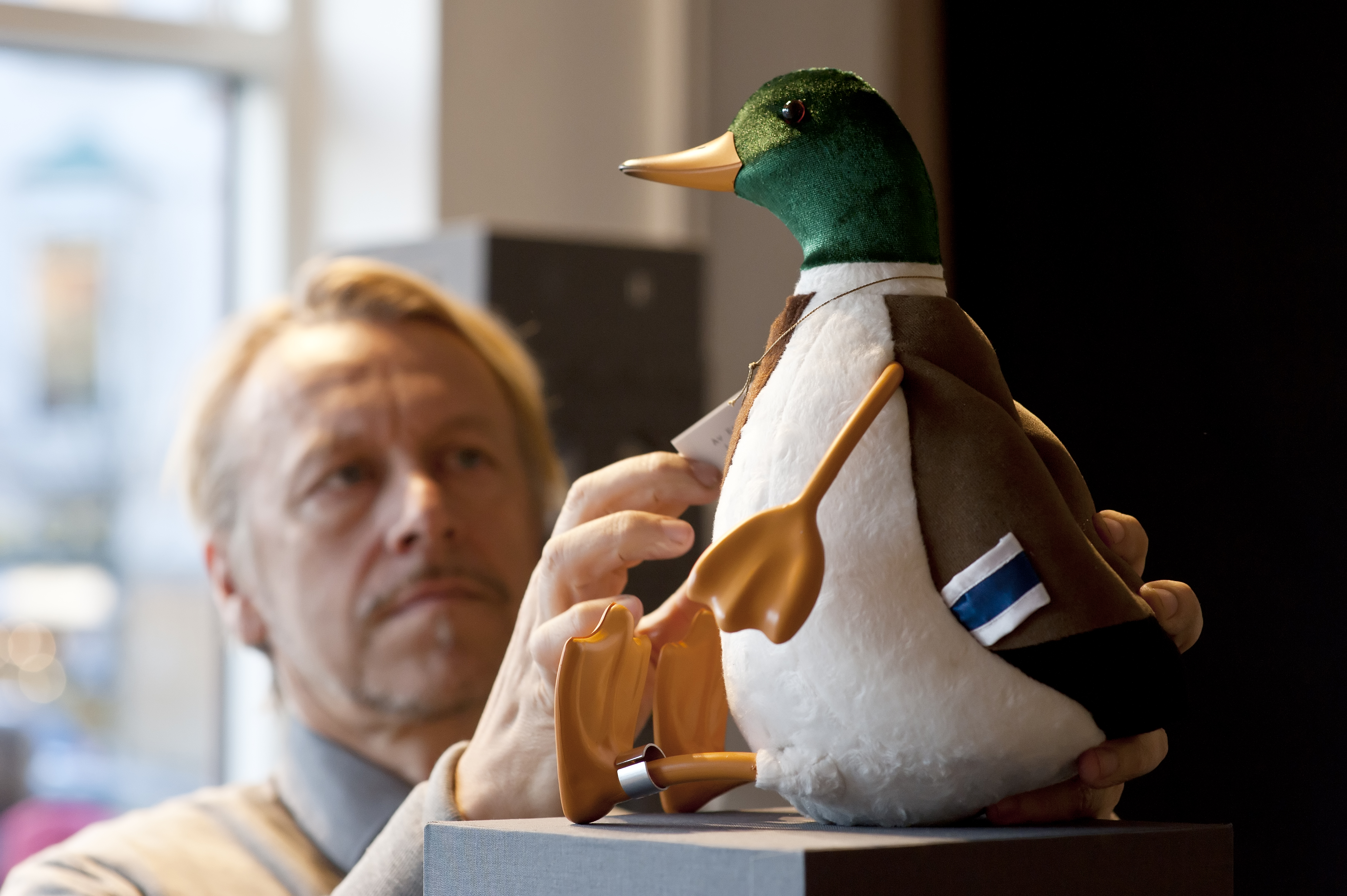
Animals are a recurring theme in Billgren's art, including mallards.

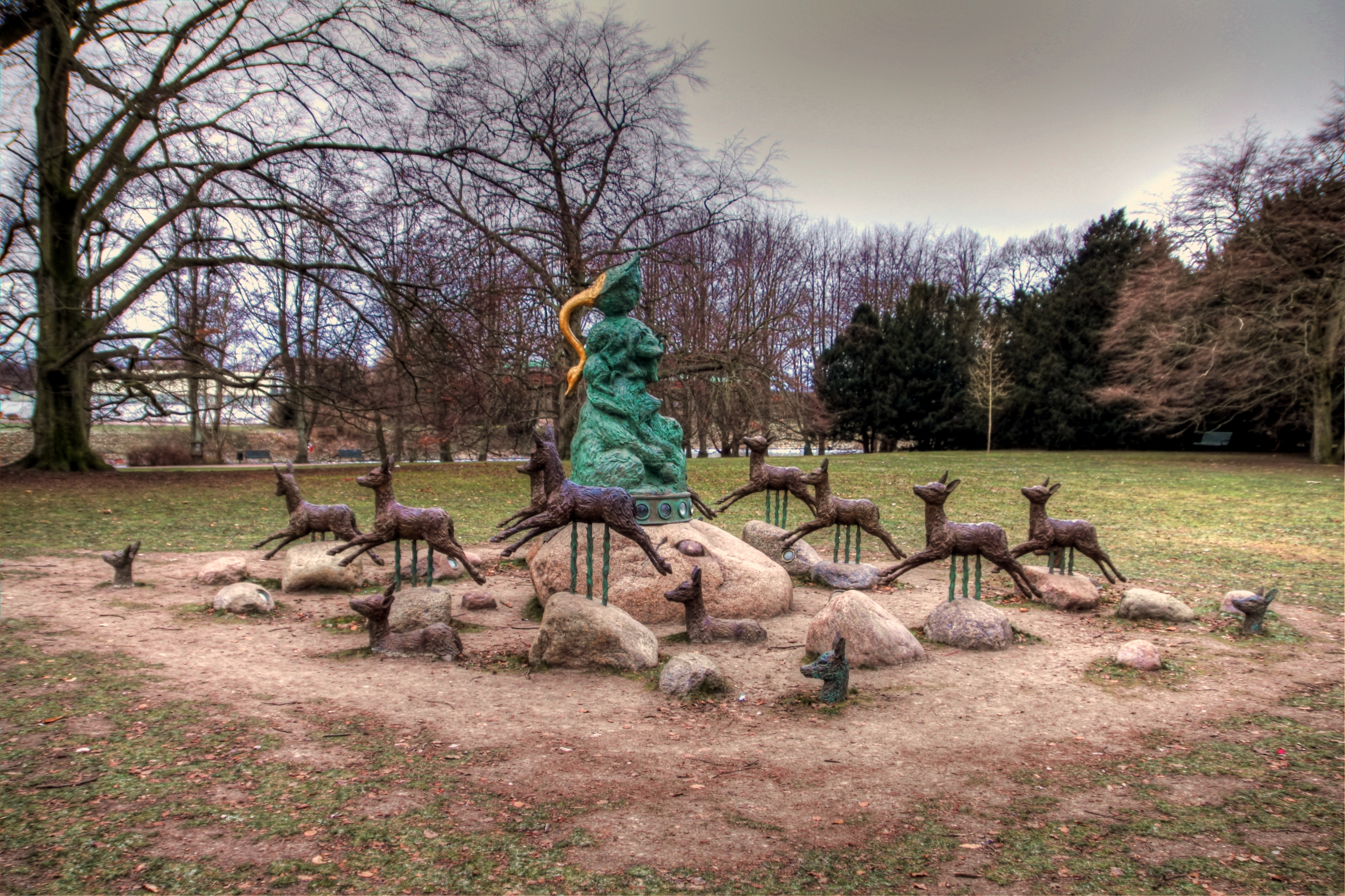
Diana (2009), sculpture group in Malmö.

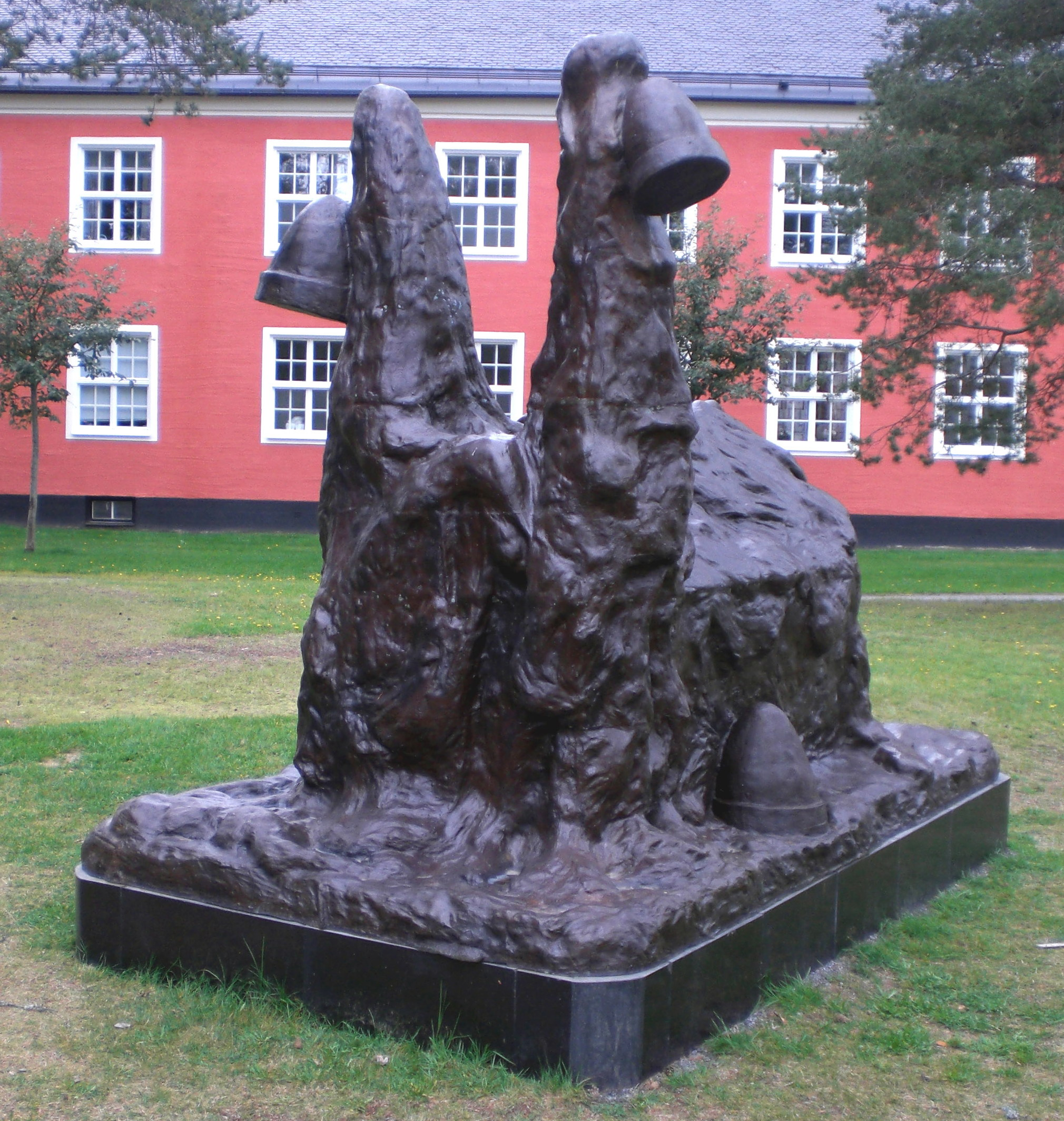
Church, (2000) in Umeå.

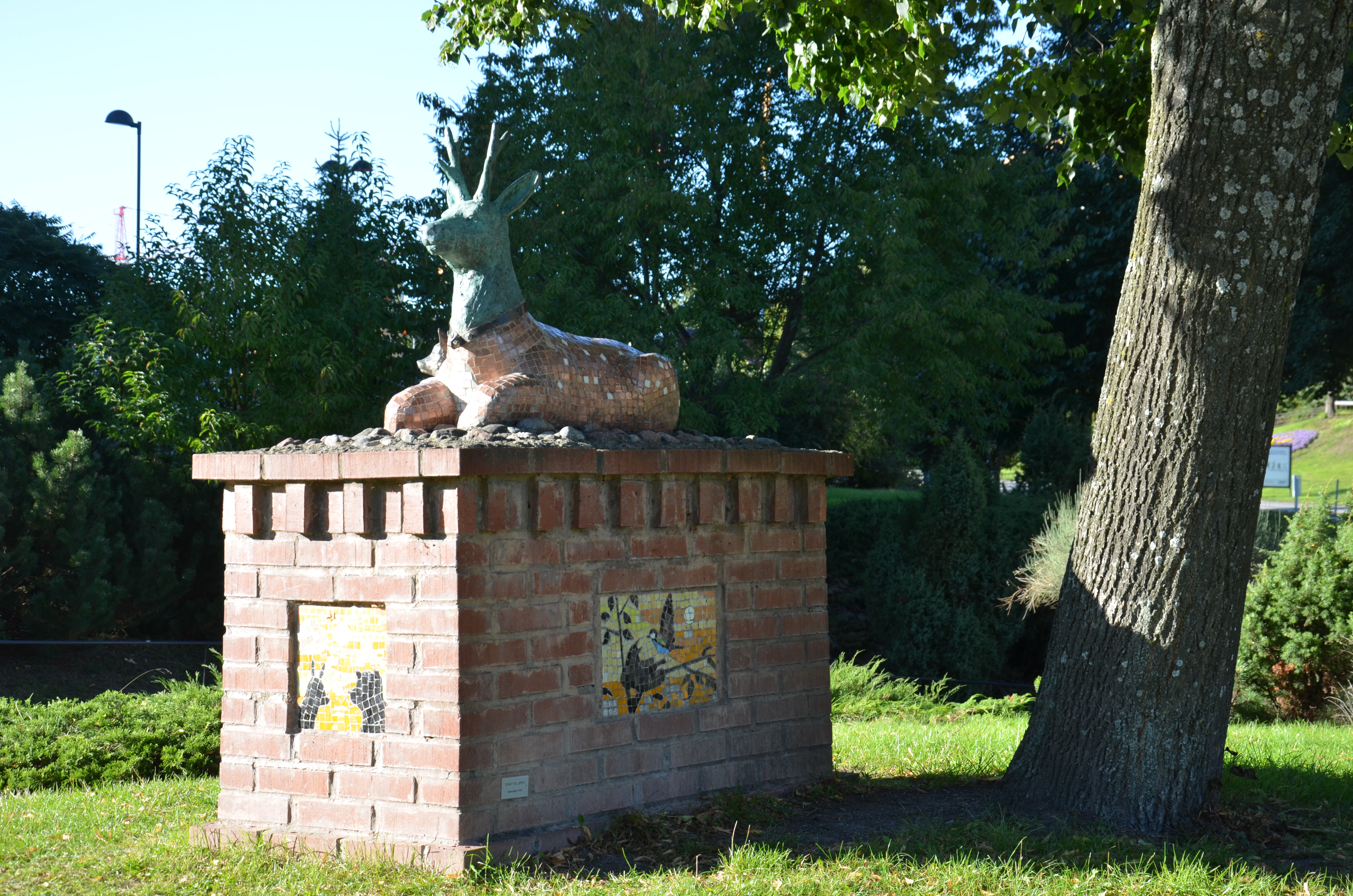
Protector (1995) in Solna.

== Public sculpture ==
- Beskyddare (1995), sculpture in bronze and mosaic, in front of the town hall of Solna
- Kyrka (2000, erected 2009), sculpture in bronze, Skeppsbron, Stockholm
- Fyra årstider (2009), fyra alternerande uppförstorade målningar, shopping centre Nacka Forum, Nacka
- Diana (2009), sculpture in bronze, Slottsgatan, Malmö
- Sångfågeln (Melodifestivalskulptur)

== Bibliography ==
- Kommittén (novel, 2003)
- Vad är konst? (2008)
- Prinsen på Lindholmen (2009)
- Vad är konst II? (2011)
- heter Vägen – en antologi om att göra bra konst, (in collaboration with Jan Åman), published in 1995 by Bonnier Alba.
