= HDK-Valand =

Arts school at the University of Gothenburg

HDK-Valand Academy of Art and Design (Swedish: HDK-Valand – Högskolan för konst och design) is a school for film, photography, literary composition, and fine art at the University of Gothenburg in Gothenburg, Sweden. Its precursors trace back to 1848 and 1865, and in this sense is older than the University of Gothenburg (founded 1891).

== History ==
=== School of Design and Crafts ===
School of Design and Crafts
- Högskolan för Design och Konsthantverk
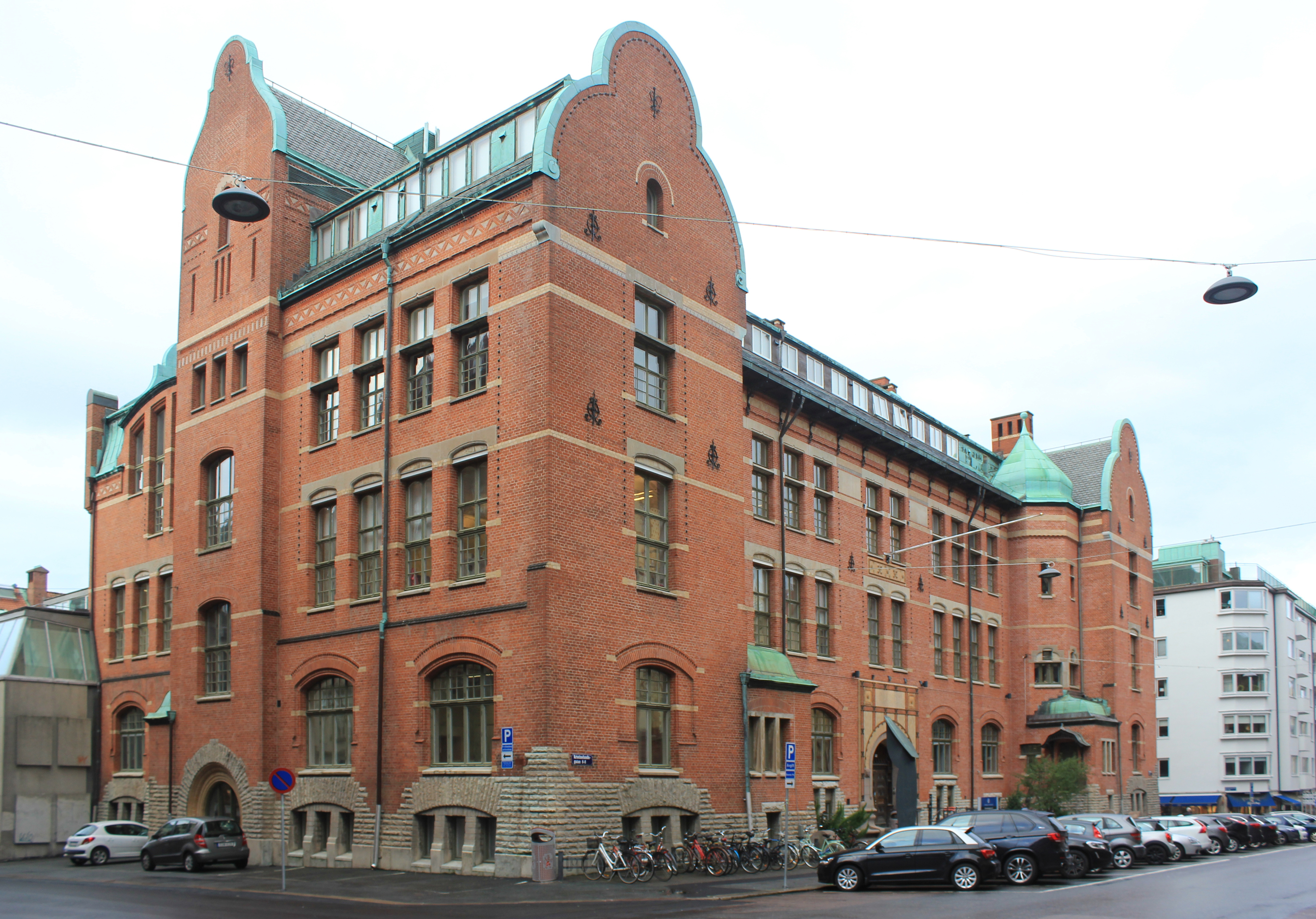
- Other name: HDK
- Former names: Slöjdföreningens skola, Konstindustriskolan, Högskolan för Design
- Type: Design school
- Established: 1848; 178 years ago
- Parent institution: University of Gothenburg
- Location: Gothenburg, Sweden
- Website: www.hdk.gu.se

The School of Design and Crafts (Swedish: Högskolan för Design och Konsthantverk, abbreviated HDK) at the University of Gothenburg was a design school in the Faculty of Fine, Applied and Performing Arts. It was started in 1848 with the name Slöjdföreningens skola.

The main building is on Kristinelundsgatan in Gothenburg. The school also contained HDK Steneby in Dals Långed.

=== Gothenburg Drawing School ===
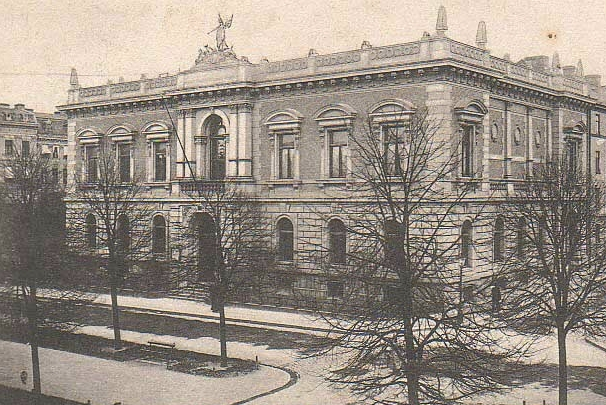
The art school Valand was for many years situated in the Valand house, as seen on this image, and which gave the school its name. Today The Valand School of Fine Art is situated across this building, on the other side of Vasagatan.

The Valand School of Fine Art was founded as the Gothenburg Drawing School (Swedish: Göteborgs Musei Ritskola) in 1865 and has been part of the University of Gothenburg since 1977. The school is situated in central Gothenburg, currently across Vasagatan from the original building. Valand was the name of the construction company formed in order to build the original building which is now occupied by a nightclub of the same name, as well as a fraternal order.

=== Valand Academy ===
In 2012, Valand Academy was formed through a merge of the Valand School of Fine Art and three other formerly independent institutions at the University of Gothenburg: the School of Film Directing, the School of Photography and the Department of Literary Composition.

=== HDK-Valand – Academy of Art and Design ===
In 2020, Valand Academy merged with another school within the same faculty, the School of Design and Crafts / HDK (in Swedish, Högskolan för Design och Konsthandverk). The merged school is now called HDK-Valand – Academy of Art and Design.

== Notable alumni ==
- Ester Almqvist
- Ivar Arosenius
- Ernst Billgren
- Helene Billgren
- Torsten Billman
- Axel Boman
- Gabo Camnitzer
- Ann Edholm
- Claes Hake
- Einar Hákonarson
- Snövit Hedstierna
- Pål Hollender
- Úlfur Karlsson
- Dan Lissvik
- Ruben Östlund
- Gustaf Tenggren
- Jim Thorell

=== For the School of Design and Crafts ===
- Annika Ekdahl
- Elsa Jernås
- Jan Wilsgaard

== Notable professors ==
- Carl Larsson
- Bruno Liljefors
- Torsten Billman
- Peter Dahl
- Maria Lindberg
- Tor Bjurström

== See also ==
- Röhsska Museum
