= Snövit Hedstierna =

Swedish artist

- Born: Mina Linda Snövit Hedstierna; Stockholm, Sweden
- Education: Concordia University
- Known for: Visual Art, Performance Art
- Website: http://www.snowwhite.se

Snövit Hedstierna is an interdisciplinary artist, film director, art curator, art writer and university teacher. Her subject matters include power structures, gender issues, existential questions and intimacy.

== Education ==
Snövit Hedstierna holds a Master of Fine Arts from Concordia University in Montreal, Canada, and a degree from Valand Academy in Gothenburg, Sweden. She holds further formal qualifications in related fields such as photography, communication, and advertising.

== Approach ==
Her work frequently includes and builds upon the lived experience of non-conforming individuals ("in the periphery"), which she re-contexutalizes using established artistic frameworks such as film, photography, performance and dance. She seeks to transcend formal categories of artistic expression by creating experiential spaces that engage the audience in a variety of sensory and conceptional modalities, most notably intimate touch.

One of her most influential works, An issue of structure, incorporates extensive sociological research: over a period of 3 years, she conducted 250 in-depth interviews with female, queer, transgender and genderfluid individuals from all Nordic countries.

== Subject matters ==
Her work has focused on gender rights as a main topic since 2013, beginning with her graduation show from Valand Academy where she displayed the photo series Practices of Looking, and the related group performance Another View, which was considered controversial for its depictions of nudity. Snövit Hedstierna has created several exhibitions where the audience has been invited to participate in different ways. One was her thesis show at Valand, To Give and To Hold, a 48 hours long durational performance where the artist offered her body as spoon for anyone in the audience saying "she rather spoon with someone than shoot someone" as a comment to the growing otherness in society. During late September 2015 Snövit Hedstierna exhibited a one-on-one performance and installation in the "Dream a Dream" solo show at the Abteilung für Alles Andere. The artist described the exhibition as "A guided sleep meditation in an experimental and transcendental environment, now and forever." During Manifesta11 in Zürich 2016, she performed the piece A source of Values in which the audience were invited to wash her naked body with a sponge, soap and water. She exhibited the video installation Sisterhood at the Pane Per Poveri pavilion at The Venice Biennale 2015 (La Biennale di Venezia).

== Notable exhibitions ==
In 2009, she founded the Pony Sugar studio, project gallery and art society, located in Gotlandsgatan, Stockholm.

Between 2014 and 2016 Hedstierna conducted the three years long research project An Issue of Structure, in which she compared The World Economic Forum's "Global Gender Gap Report" and the FRA-report with in-depth interviews from 250 female/queer/ transgender/gender fluid people, to shed light on personal experiences of gender and gender affiliations in the Nordic countries. The work resulted in several installations in so called "episodes" that the artists exhibited between 2016 and 2017 around the Nordic Countries.

During mid September 2015 she exhibited in Los Angeles alongside artists such as Kim Gordon, Kathleen Hanna and Barbara Kruger as she participated in Jessie Askinazi and Rose McGowan's Yes All Women art show, named after the #YesAllWomen hashtag. Hedstierna contributed with photography and also with the epic performance You Are Not Alone which got reviewed as "bare and gutting".

During 2018 she again participated in Manifesta12 in Palermo by showing the piece Achievement of falling at the collateral event Politics of Dissonance. During 2018 the artist worked on the production of four new feature films within the speculative dystopian sci-fi genre, accompanied by a VR-movie released in September 2018.

Earlier exhibitions include Manifesta12 Politics of dissonance, Norrtälje Konsthall, Mengi (Reykjavík), Malmö Konsthall, Skövde Konsthall, Göteborgs Konsthall, Strömstad Konsthall, Gothenburg International Biennal for Contemporary Art, and Norrtälje Konsthall.

== Activism ==
In 2017, the Swedish art magazine Konstnären published an open statement by the artist about her experiences of sexual assault within the art world, which evoked a larger debate. She has since been an active participant in the #metoo movement, focussing mainly on her experience within the Scandinavian art scene. She participated in several talks and debates in both Norway, Sweden and Denmark during 2017–2018.
