= Snow White (horse) =

American Standardbred racehorse

- Breed: Standardbred
- Sire: Self Possessed
- Dam: Moms Millionaire
- Sex: Mare
- Foaled: 2005

Snow White (foaled 22 January 2005, euthanized 2 July 2009) was a champion Standardbred harness racehorse. She was sired by Self Possessed, out of Moms Millionaire, a Pine Chip mare. The filly was owned by North State Street Stable, Harness The Power, and Jerry Silva. As of 24 November 2007, Snow White earned $1,251,151 and had a mark of 1:52.4, a world record for two-year-old trotters, regardless of sex.

== Races ==
Snow White was well known not only for her wins in the 2007 Breeder's Crown, 2007 Goldsmith Maid, and 2007 Oakville Stakes, but for her winning margins in these races. She won the races by 12 1/2, 12 1/4, and 6 1/2 lengths, respectively. In 13 races, she has a record of 11-0-1. The only two times she lost were races in which she broke stride. She had gone off as the post-time favorite in every one of her starts.

Date	Track	Race	Purse	Finish	Time	Last 1/4	Odds	Driver	Trainer
19 June 2008	Meadowlands	QUAL	$0	1/10T	1:55.3	28.3	NB	John Campbell	Kevin Lare
12 June 2008	Meadowlands	QUAL	$0	1/6	1:56.3	27.2	NB	John Campbell	Kevin Lare
24 November 2007	Meadowlands	Breeder's Crown F	$650 000	1/12H	1:55.1	28.2	*0.10	John Campbell	Kevin Lare
27 October 2007	Woodbine	Goldsmith F	$679 068	1/12Q	1:57.4	30.4		John Campbell	Kevin Lare

== Death ==
Snow White was euthanized July 2, 2009, following colic surgery. She was found to be suffering a twisted intestine, and approximately 50 feet of damaged intestine was discovered. She was given a 5-10% chance of survival, but the damage was too great, and the owners conferred with the veterinarians and made the difficult decision to put her down.
