= Eisblume =

German pop rock band

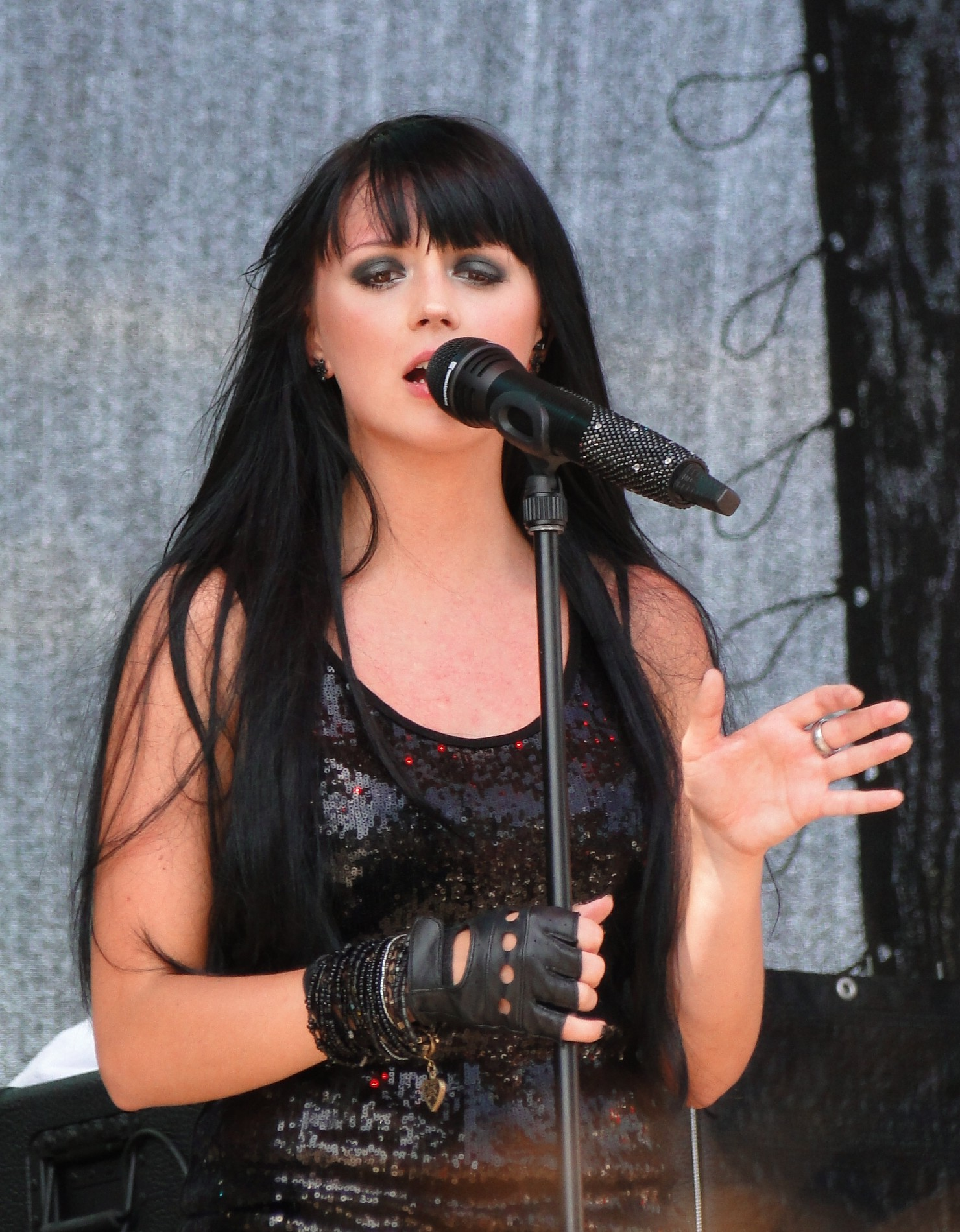
- Eisblume's singer Sotiria Schenk performing in August 2009.

Background information
- Origin: Berlin, Germany
- Genres: Rock; pop rock; dark wave; dark rock
- Years active: 2007–2013
- Labels: B1; Universal Germany
- Members: Sotiria Schenk; Benny Baumann; Philipp Schardt; Philipp Schadebrodt; Golo Schultz
- Past members: Christoph Hessler
- Website: www.eisblume.de

Eisblume (German for "Frost Flower") was a German pop rock band whose debut album spawned the top five hit single "Eisblumen" in Germany in 2009.

== History ==
The band was formed in Berlin during 2007 by vocalist Sotiria Schenk, guitarist Christoph Hessler, bassist Philipp Schardt, drummer Philipp Schadebrodt and keyboard player Golo Schultz. With the help of production team Valicon, Eisblume released their first EP titled "Unter dem Eis" (German for "Under the Ice") in 2008. In the summer of 2008, they played the support slot for a number of concerts of Ich + Ich's tour. VIVA, a German TV station, has been supporting the group in terms of "Artistic Development" through "comprehensive media support" since late 2008.

In January 2009, Eisblume released their single "Eisblumen" (German for "Frost Flowers"), a cover of Subway to Sally's song originally released in 2005. The Eisblume version, which was produced by Ingo Politz of Valicon, reached number 3 on the German singles charts and went on to become the 43rd best-selling single of 2009 in Germany. The song's video also earned the band a nomination for the "Best National Video" at the 2009 ECHO awards. They were also nominated for three VIVA Comet awards in 2009: "Best Newcomers", Best Online Star" and "Best Video".

Their first album Unter dem Eis was released in March 2009 by Universal Music. In the spring of 2009 they began their own headlining tour in support of the album. They also were supported by Swiss band Lacrimosa during their German tour dates in September 2009.

Their second single "Leben ist Schön" (German for "Life is Beautiful") peaked at number 18, and helped their album to return to the Top 20 of the German album charts. Their third single "Louise", a cover version of a Bell, Book & Candle song translated into German, was released in November 2009 and peaked at number 29. The song helped them to earn their second and third ECHO award nominations for "Best National Video" and "Best National Newcomer" in 2010.

In March 2010, the band announced that they were set to record "Fleurs de glace", a French version of the band's debut single "Eisblume", with French singer Jena Lee.

In January 2012 the band released their second album, Ewig and disbanded one year later.

== Band members ==
- Sotiria "Ria" Schenk – vocals
- Benny Baumann – guitar
- Philipp Schardt – bass
- Philipp Schadebrodt – drums
- Golo Schultz – keyboards

== Discography ==
Albums

Year	Album	Chart positions		
Year	Album	GER	AUT	SWI
2009	Unter dem Eis: Formats: CD, digital download	12	24	-
2012	Ewig: Formats: CD, digital download	-	-	-

Extended Plays

Year	EP details
2008	Unter dem Eis EP: Released on May 16, 2008; Format: CD

Singles

Year	Title	Chart Positions		
Year	Title	GER	AUT	SWI
2009	"Eisblumen"	3	25	97
2009	"Leben Ist Schön"	18	55	-
2009	"Louise" (feat. Scala)	29	-	-
2012	"Für Immer"	29	60	73
