= Sotiria (singer) =

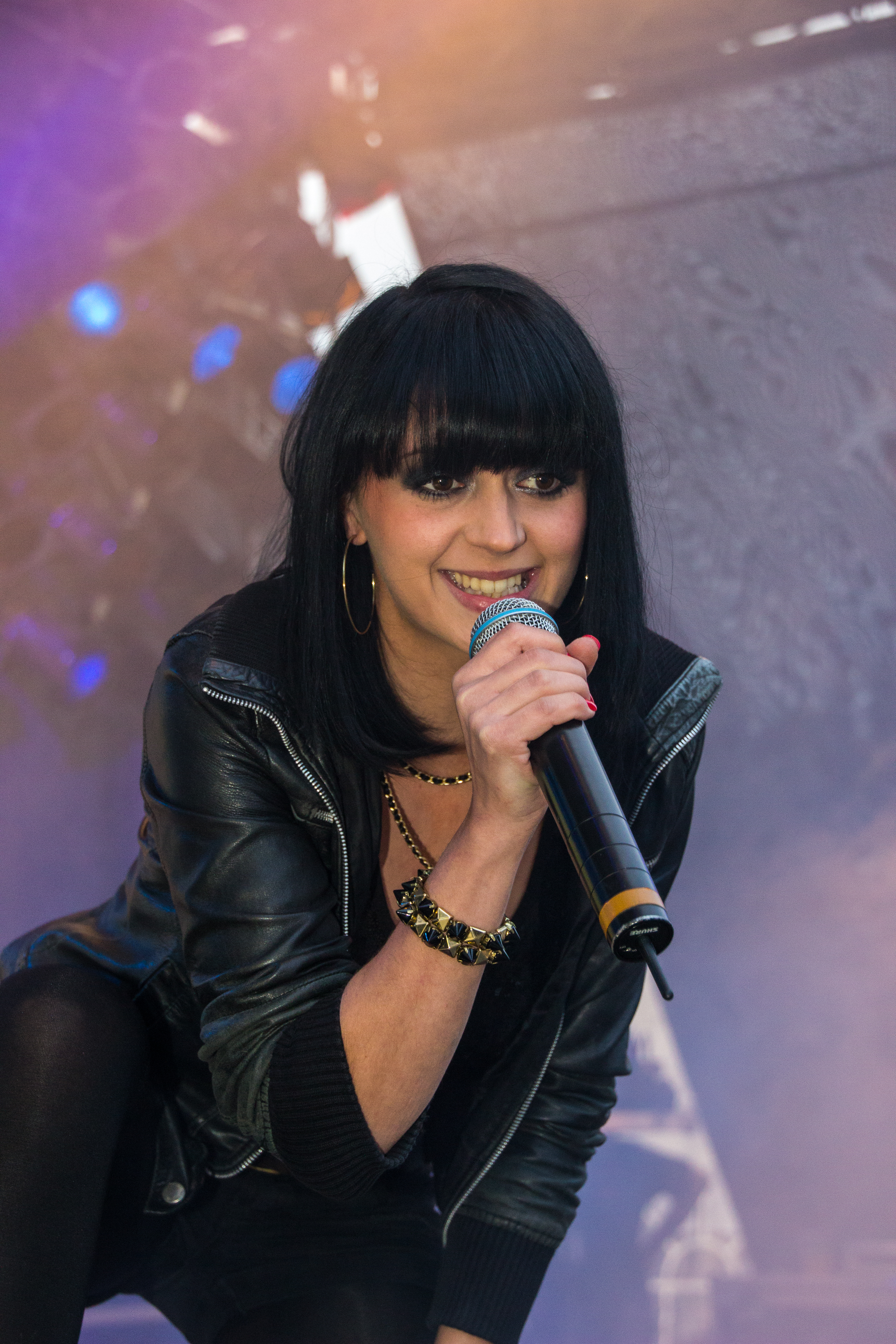
- Sotiria performing in 2013

Background information
- Also known as: Sotiria
- Born: Sotiria Schenk; 1 January 1987 (age 39); Berlin
- Genres: Pop

Sotiria Schenk (born 1 January 1987) is a German singer. She became particularly well known as the frontwoman of the band Eisblume, before launching a solo career.

== Biography ==
Sotiria Schenk's father is Greek and is separated from her mother. Schenk began vocal and piano training at the age of eight. In 2001, at the age of 14, she sang the title song " Mädchen müssenhärte sein" (Girls Have to Be Tougher) for the film "Mädchen, Mädchen" (Girls on Top) under the name Ria Schenk. After graduating from high school, she studied music and media management for a year.

In 2007 she founded the band Eisblume and released two commercially successful albums with the band in 2009 and 2012. The band broke up in 2013.

In 2016, it was announced that Sotiria was collaborating with Der Graf, formerly of Unheilig. While her former band continued to make music with The Dark Tenor, Der Graf wrote songs for Sotiria. In October 2018, the album Hallo Leben was released. The limited edition fan box also includes a demo-CD with unreleased Unheilig songs. The album reached number six on the German Album Charts. In 2020, she released an Italian version of Geboren um zu leben.

In August 2020, the first single from her second studio album, Einfach nur ein Mädchen (Just a Girl), was released. The second single, Vielleicht (Maybe), followed in February 2021, and the third single, Herz (Heart), in May. With the song "Herz", she represented Greece at the Free European Song Contest 2021 the day after its release, where she finished second to last. In August 2021, two more singles, Zurück ans Meer (Back to the Sea) and Für immer wir zwei (Forever the Two of Us), were released, before Sotiria's second studio album, Mein Herz (My Heart), was released the following month. The album also reached number six on the German album charts.

After the release of Mein Herz, things became quieter for Sotiria for a while. In April 2023, she appeared as a guest vocalist on Memento mori by Nino de Angelos, and supported him during his Von Ewigkeit zu Ewigkeit tour in September and October of the same year.

In October 2024, Sotiria released "Schwarzer Diamant" as their first single from their third studio album. Two months later, the second single, "Tanzen Richtung Untergang," followed. In January, the third single, "Weiß wie Schnee", a collaboration with German synth-pop singer Peter Heppner, was released.

== Discography ==
With Eisblume

=== Studio albums ===
- 2018: Hallo Leben
- 2021: Mein Herz
- 2025: Meine Liebe ist Gift

=== Singles ===
- 2018: Hallo Leben (feat. Unheilig)
- 2018: Ein Licht für dich
- 2019: Ich wünsche mir ein Feuer
- 2020: Einfach nur ein Mädchen
- 2021: Vielleicht
- 2021: Herz
- 2021: Zurück ans Meer
- 2021: Für immer wir zwei
- 2024: Schwarzer Diamant
- 2024: Tanzen Richtung Untergang
- 2025: Meine Liebe ist Gift
- 2025: Weiß wie Schnee (feat. Peter Heppner)
- 2025: Rubinrot
- 2025: Eisblumen (2025)

Guest vocals

- 2023: Memento mori (Nino de Angelo feat. Sotiria)
- 2025: Die Hoffnung stirbt zuletzt (Eisbrecher feat. Sotiria)
