= Gábor Kornél Tolnai =

Hungarian born Swedish engineer (1902–1982)

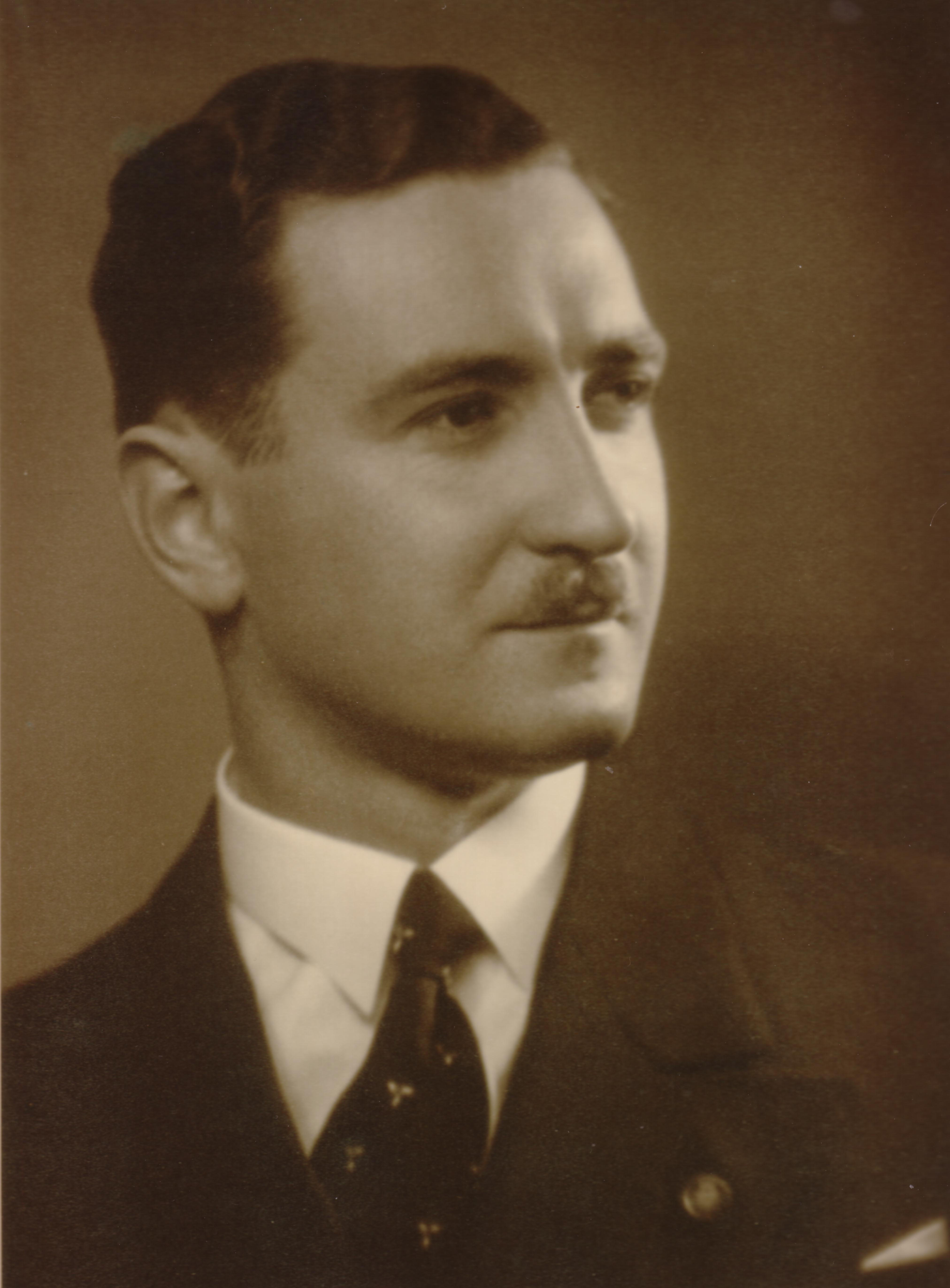
- Gábor Kornél Tolnai in 1935
- Born: November 22, 1902; Budapest, Austria-Hungary
- Died: February 3, 1982 (aged 79); Stockholm, Sweden
- Citizenship: Swedish (post-1940); Hungarian (pre-1940)
- Education: Technical University of Budapest, Budapest, Hungary
- Known for: Devices for Spinning Machines: Centralograph, Teletachograph, Regulator; Tempering machine: Impulse engine Fire-control system for the Swedish National Defense (Royal Swedish Army Materiel Administration: Central Instrument and Rapportoskop; Tolnai Tape recorders of his own: Tolnai LP16, Tolnai LP20, Tolnai LP24, Tolnai LP28, Tolnai Studymaster.
- Scientific career
- Fields: Mechanical engineering Precision engineering Electrical engineering
- Workplaces: Linum-Taussig, Budapest and Győr; Dipl.ing. G.K.Tolnai Okl. Gépészmérnök Finommechanikai Készülékek (Apparatebauanstalt), IX Budapest, Mester-útca 13, a precision-tool workshop of his own Ericsson, Stockholm and Budapest; Bofors; AB Gerh. Arehns Mekaniska Verkstad, Stockholm; Arenco AB, Stockholm; AB G.K. Tolnai, Stockholm.
- Doctoral advisor: Diploma Engineer's degree

Gábor Kornél Tolnai (November 22, 1902, in Budapest – February 3, 1982, in Stockholm) was a Hungarian-Swedish engineer and inventor. He is best known for his inventions and patents for spinning machines, devices for the Swedish National Defense and several types of tape recorders.

== Biography ==
Kornél Tolnai was born in 1902 in Budapest in Hungary and took his Diploma Engineer's degree at the Technical University of Budapest in 1924.

During the years 1928–1931 Kornél Tolnai made three inventions of his own, Centralograph, Teletachograph and Regulator, which he accomplished completely. After that he came into contact with the Swedish LM Ericsson. They bought his patents and then he was working at LM Ericsson, both in Stockholm and in Budapest for some years. He set up an experimental workshop in Stockholm and worked with designs and inventions, some of which led to patents. He was active in Sweden from 1935 and became a Swedish citizen in 1940.

== Marriage and family ==
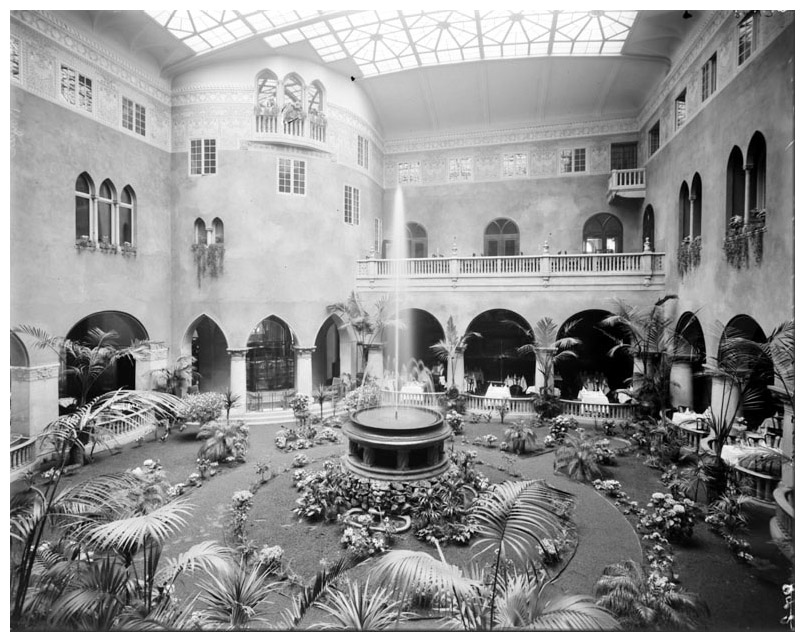
Grand Hotel Royal "Winter garden", Stockholm. (Photo from 1909).

Gábor Kornél Tolnai was the son of Gábor Tolnai and his wife Ilona Tolnai. His father was active in the Magyar Államvasutak, the Hungarian State Railways, popularly MÁV.

In 1932, he met his Swedish wife at a party in the "Winter garden" (Vinterträdgården) at Grand Hôtel Royal in Stockholm, when the Swedish-Hungarian society had a jubilee. The Swedish artist David Wallin had just sold a painting, Mother and Child, to the Museum of Fine Arts in Budapest (Hungarian: Szépművészeti Múzeum), and David Wallin was invited to Grand Hotel Royal (Grand Hôtel Royal with the Winter garden) and he took his 22-year-old daughter Bianca with him. She was an educated artist. Kornél and Bianca engaged on January 24, 1935. In 1935, on September 17, Kornél Tolnai married the Swedish artist Bianca Wallin (1909–2006). She was the daughter of the famous artist David Wallin (1876–1957) and his wife Elin Wallin (1884–1969). In 1935 the couple settled down in Stockholm and in 1942 he moved with his family to a large villa in Bromma, outside Stockholm, where he lived with his family until he died in 1982 at nearly eighty years of age. He had three daughters, Eva, born in 1939, Monika, born in 1942 and Hillevi, born in 1944.

== Studies in Budapest ==
Gábor Kornél Tolnai entered the German-speaking Lutheran Fasori Gimnázium in Budapest for eight years in 1912 through 1920. Budapest–Fasori Evangélikus Gimnázium, 1071 Budapest, Városligeti fasor 17–21, was one of the best schools in Budapest, and he got his higher school certificate in the spring of 1920. He was a classmate of Eugene Wigner, eminent physicist, mathematician and Nobel Prize winner in Physics in 1963 and schoolmate of John von Neumann, eminent mathematician, physicist, polymath and inventor of the computor. Fasori Evangélikus Gimnázium had a strong academic tradition and outstanding teachers, i.e. mathematics teacher László Rátz, physics teacher Mikola Sándor and class teacher Imre Oppel. Fasori Gimnázium is a famous secondary school in Budapest. It is located near the City Park.

After graduating Gábor Kornél Tolnai studied at the Technical University of Budapest. He was ready in record time with his Diploma Engineer degree only 21 years old in the spring of 1924. After his diploma in Budapest in spring 1924 Gábor Kornél Tolnai settled down in Paris for study and practice for three years.

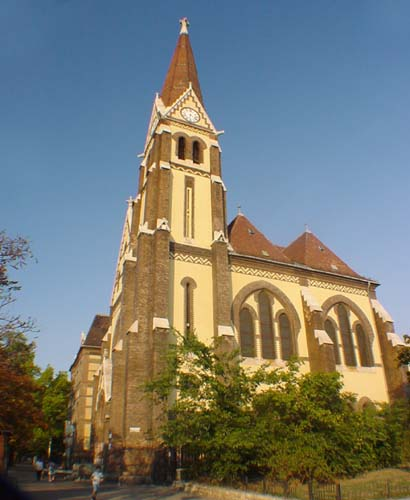
Budapest Fasori Evangélikus Gimnázium with the Fasor Lutheran Church. The building belongs to the school.

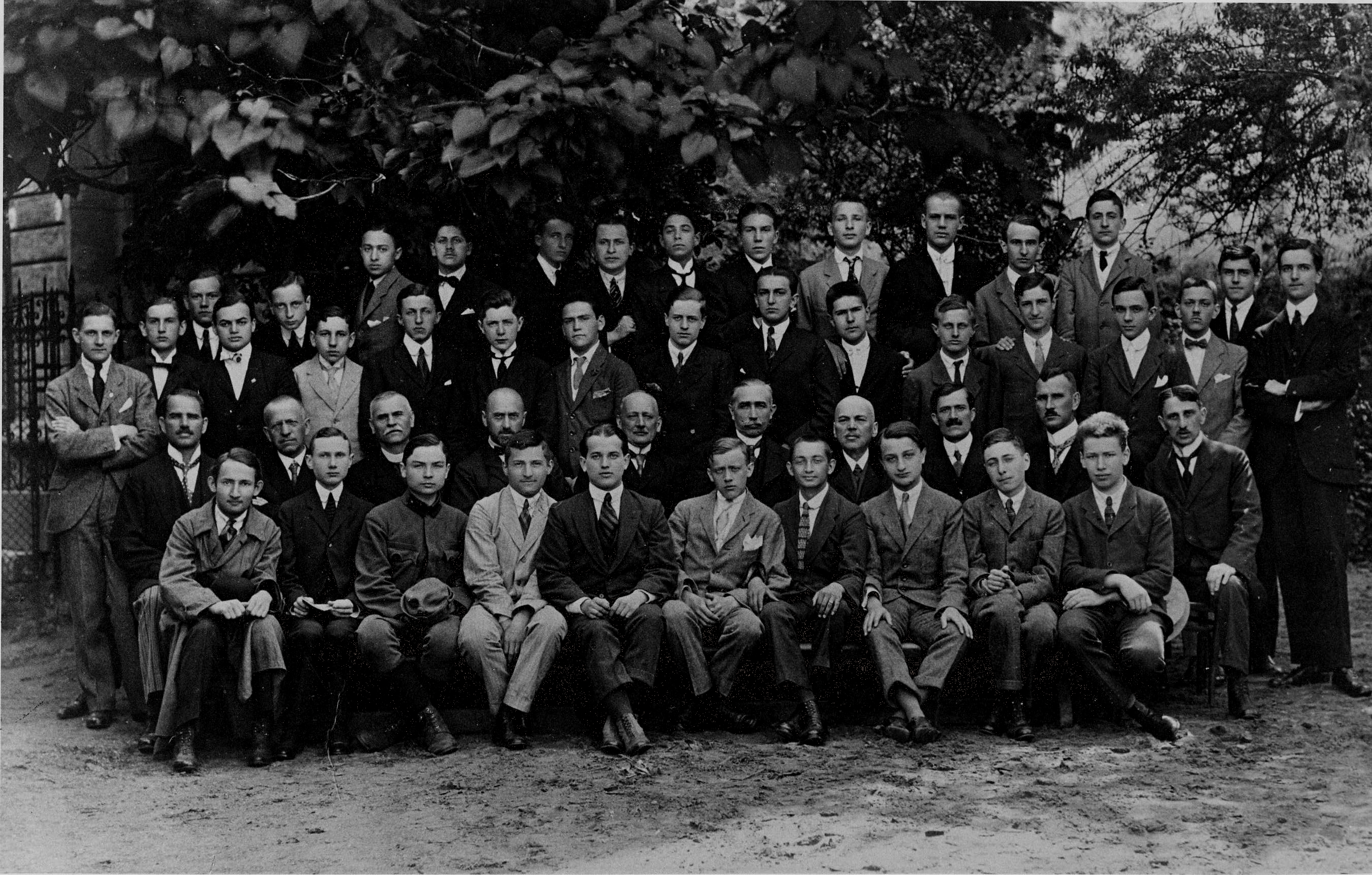
Budapest-Fasori Evangélikus Gimnáziuim. The highschool class in 1919. Gábor Kornél Tolnai is in the third raw, the fifth from the right and his classmate Eugene Wigner is in the front (first) raw, the second from the right.

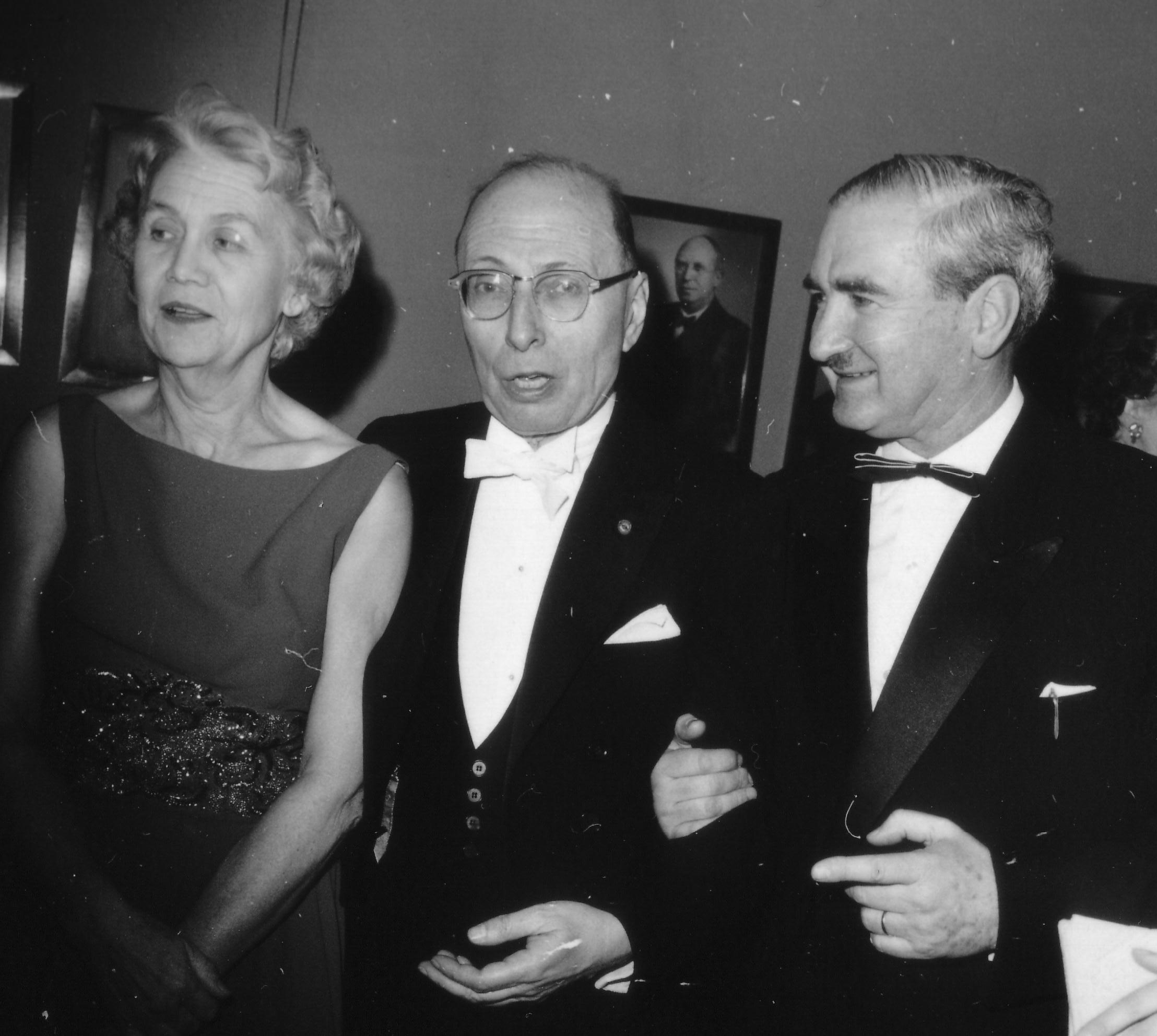
Gábor Kornél Tolnai, to the right, meets Eugene Wigner, in the middle, in Stockholm on December 13, 1963. Wigner was awarded the Nobel Prize in Physics on December 10, 1963. Mrs Mary Annette Wheeler Wigner to the left.

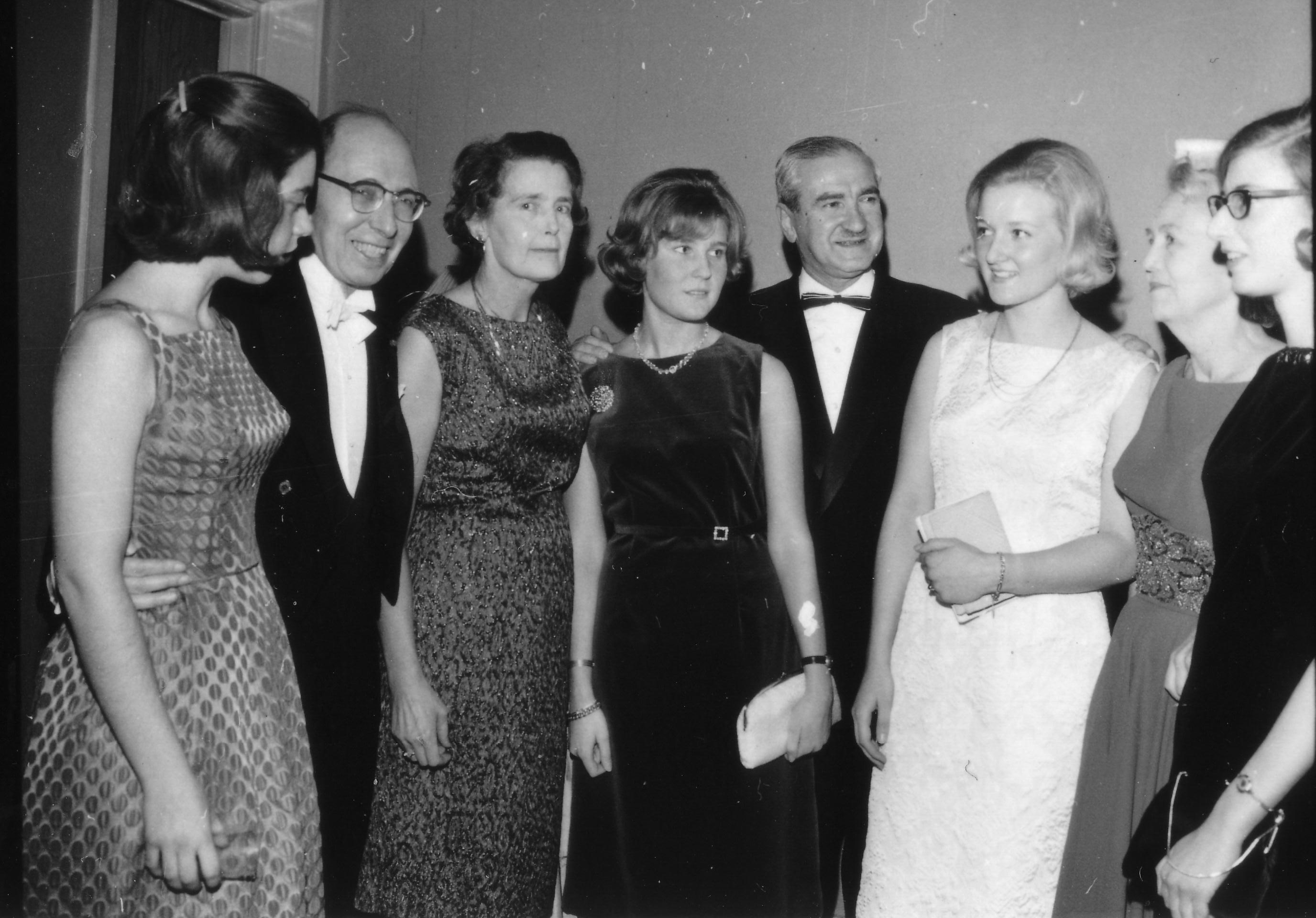
Gábor Kornél Tolnai meets Eugene Wigner in Stockholm on December 13, 1963. Here they meet each other together with their both families.

== Inventions, patents, employment and self-employed ==
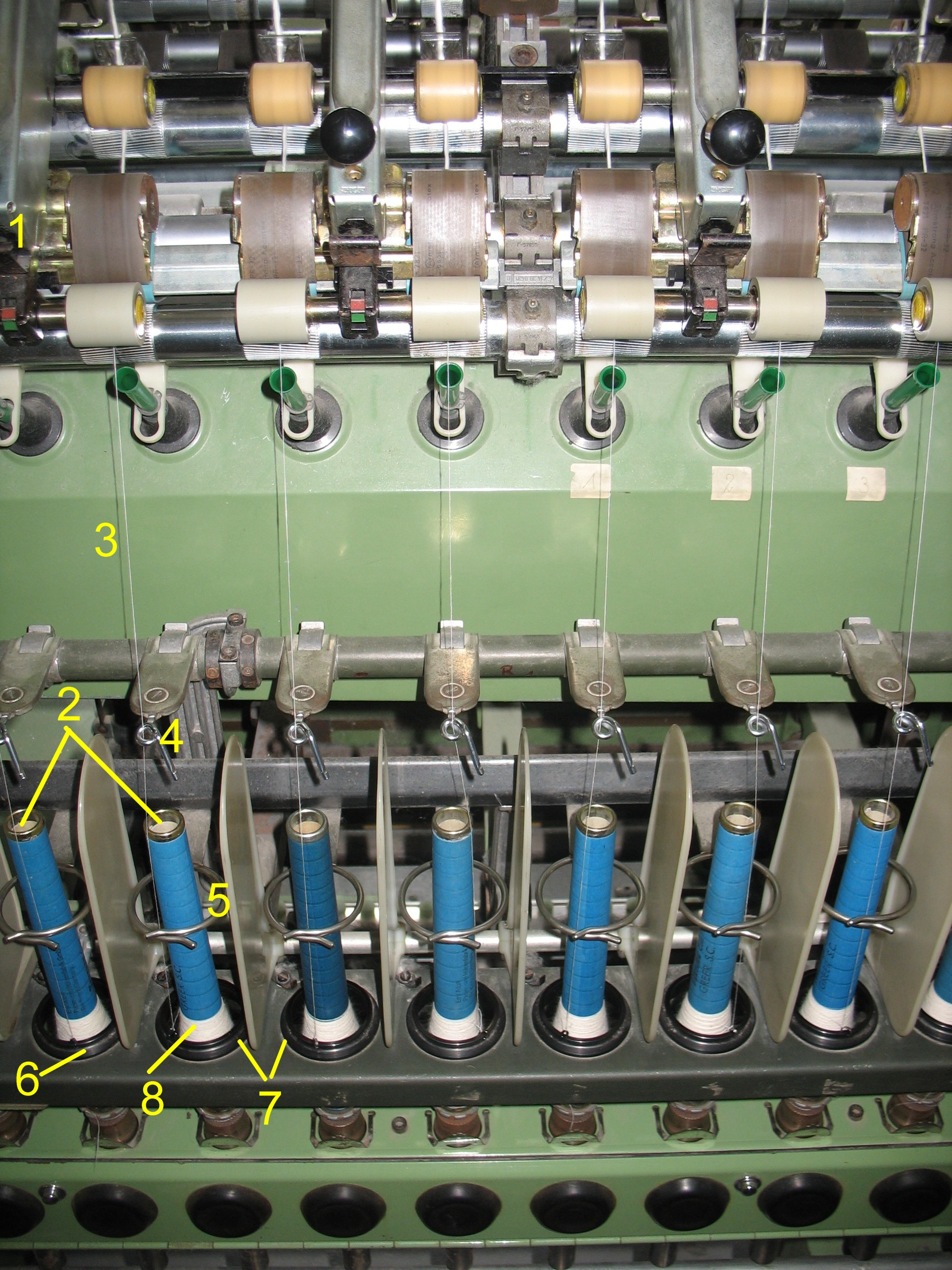
Ring spinning frame.

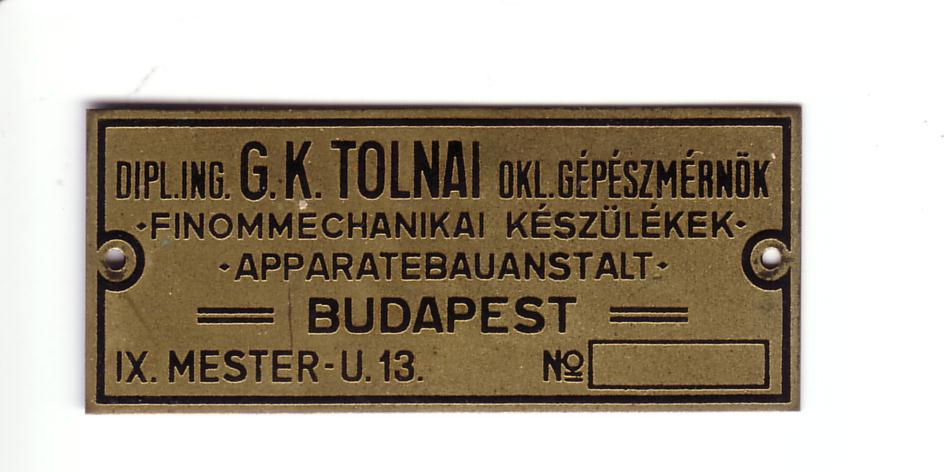
Brass plate for the fine mechanical workshop. Dipl.ing. G. K. Tolnai started in the autumn of 1928 his own company where he had his precision-tool workshop, Finommechanikai készülékek, på Mester útca 13, IX. Budapest in the district of Ferencváros, under the name of G.K. Tolnai Okl. Gépészmérnök (Diploma electrical engineer), where he manufactured his own apparatus, mechanical equipments and devices. The picture shows how the display on the apparatus looked like.

=== The Group Linum-Taussig ===
In the autumn of 1927 Tolnai returned to Budapest and became an employee of the Group Linum-Taussig in Budapest as a technical superior and supervisor of the company's industrial spinning machines for spinning textiles manufacturing in the process (Manufacturing process management, MPM) of creating yarn from various raw fibre materials. Spinning is an ancient textile art in which plant, animal or synthetic fibers, are twisted together to form yarn. Linum-Taussig was established in 1922.

The head office of the company Linum-Taussig Sámuel és Fiai Lenfonó és Szövőipar Részvénytársaság was in Budapest, and they also had a branch office in Győr. Linum-Taussig Sámuel és Fiai Lenfonó és Szövőipari Rt. was founded in 1922. For the company Linum-Taussig Kornél Tolnai also worked as a supervisor in the city of Győr (German: Raab) at their spinning machine factory there. Győr is the most important industrial city of northwest Hungary and is situated about 30 km from Budapest between Budapest and Vienna, with waggons and machinery factories. The factory system began widespread use somewhat later when cotton spinning of textiles was mechanized.

The company in Győr had mechanical flax- and hemp weaving for surface treatment, finishing and impregnation, fabrics of jute, production of bags and tents transportation. The plant had a wide product range of tablecloths, towels, pressings, tarpaulin sheets, and canvas cloths made up of technical textiles. The name of the company, Group Linum-Taussig, shows that it was about Linum (flax). Linum is a genus of approximately 200 species in the flowering plant family Linaceae, native to temperate and subtropical regions of the world. It includes the Common Flax (L. usitatissimum), the bast fibre of which is used to produce linen and the seeds to produce linseed oil.

=== Own company, G.K. Tolnai Fine Mechanical Devices ===
A year later, in the autumn of 1928, he established himself as self-employed in Budapest with a precision-tool workshop, whose activity was based on three of his own inventions, which he had patented. All these inventions were intended for the registration and improvement of the running of the spinning machines. At times he had about ten employees in his workshop. The name of his firm was Dipl.ing. G.K. Tolnai, Finommechanikai készülékek for Fine mechanical devices, in Mester útca 13, IX. Budapest in the district of Ferencváros. In his machine workshop in Budapest he manufactured the machines, which he had invented, and he also collaborated with the manager of the company Linum Taussig, Paul Hermann (Hungarian: Hermann Pál), Budaörsi út 45, XI. Budapest, Újbuda in the district of Újbuda. The machine was a tool that consisted of one or more parts, and used energy to achieve a particular goal. The machines were usually powered by mechanical, chemical, thermal, or electrical means, and were frequently motorized. A powered tool also requires moving parts to classify as a machine.

== The early 1930s ==
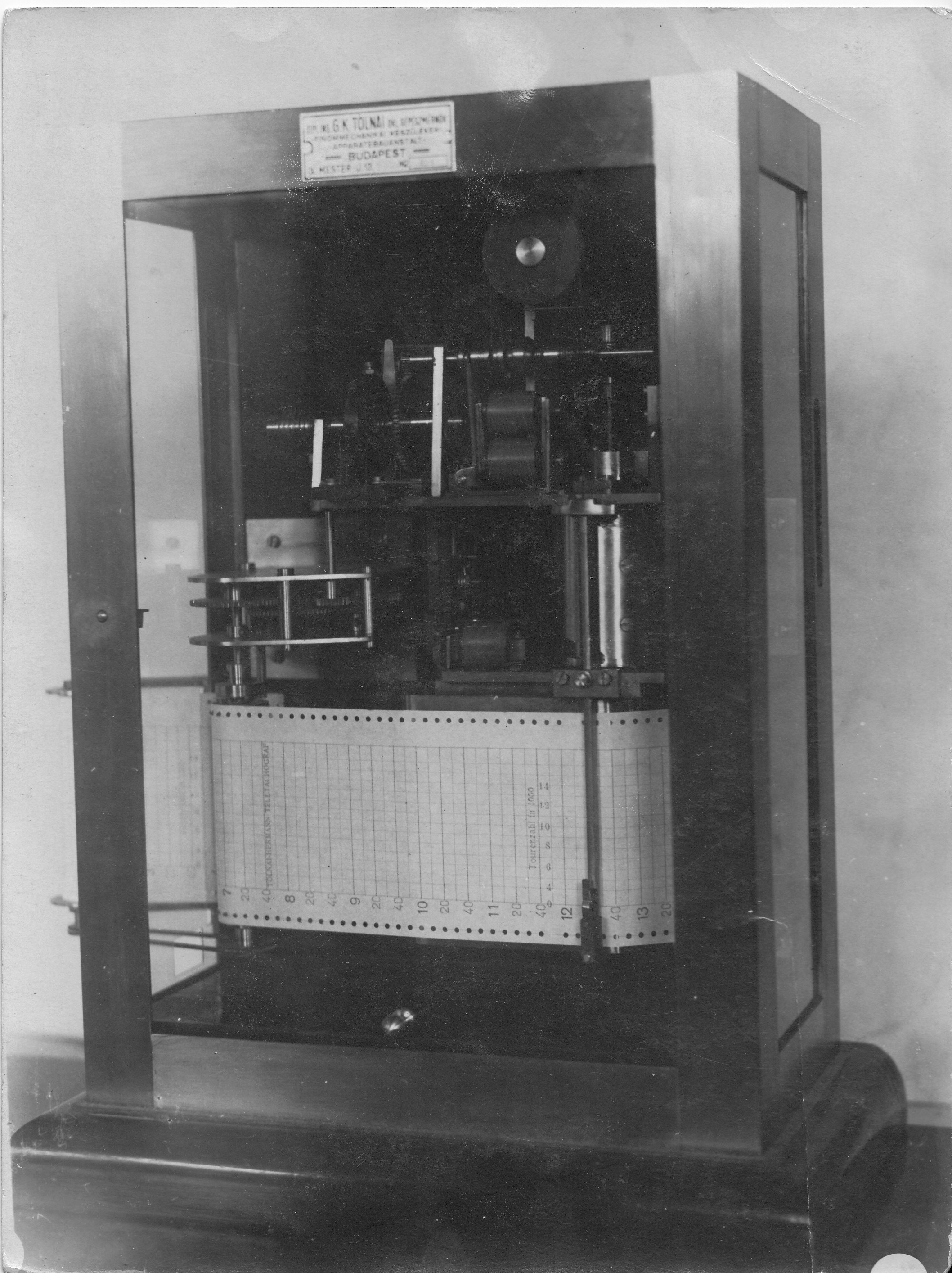
Tolnai's Centralograph for production monitoring and recording of the spinning machines' time. Photo from the workshop in Budapest, 1931. Note the brass plate on top of the appliance.

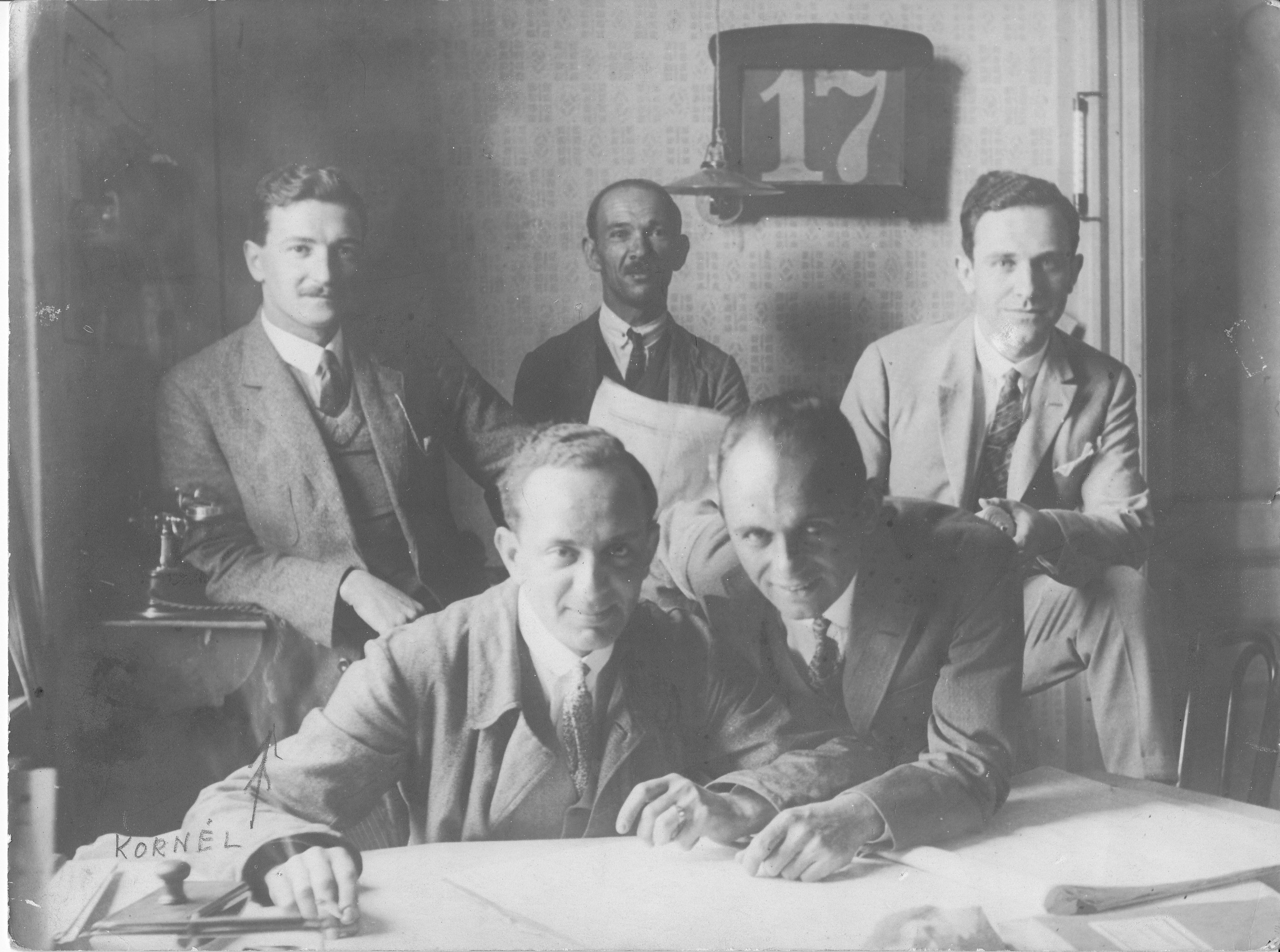
The inventor Kornél Tolnai leftmost along with some of the engineering workers in Tolnai's mechanical workshop in Budapest. Photo in 1931.

During the years 1928–1931 Kornél Tolnai made three inventions of his own, Centralograph, Teletachograph and Regulator, which he accomplished completely. He manufactured the Centralograph in his own workshop, called "Dipl.ing. GK Tolnai Okl. Gépészmérnök", M. Sc. G K Tolnai Master of Science Mechanical, in Mester útca (1928–1931). The spinning of textiles is a major industry for production monitoring and registration of the running of the spinning machines in workshops and offices. It is part of the textile manufacturing process where three types of fibres are converted into yarn, then fabrics.

- The Centralograph was used for production monitoring and registration of the running of the spinning machines in workshop and offices. The Centralograph is a recording instrument equipped with a number of printing units which record data on a moving chart. The record appears in the form of dashes and numerical digits in a series of columns. The printing units have electromagnet coil which are actuated by external impulses. The chart and the ink ribbon are driven either by a synchronous motor or by an impulse motor. Synchronous motors are commonly used in analog electric clocks, timers and other devices where correct time is required.

Later on, when Ericsson has bought Tolnai's patent, the LM Ericsson Centralograph was used in industry for the supervision of manufacturing processes and of the function and degree of utilization of machinery. The Centralograph was used as a service observation instrument in automatic telephone exchanges. In LM Ericsson's automatic transit exchanges it was also used for the recording of faults discovered by markers and v.f. receivers. The Swedish Telecommunications Administration (Televerket) has developed application for the Centralograph in telephone exchanges for supervision of automatic processes. One of the first people to build a telephone exchange was Hungarian Tivadar Puskás in 1877 while he was working for Thomas Edison. In 1894 Nicola Tesla constructed a Flat Spiral Coil, United States Patent and Trademark Office U.S. patent 0,512,340 512,340.

- The Teletachograph was a device for registration and improvement of the running of spinning machines, "for remote control of machinery", which combines the functions of a clock and a speedometer (1931–1933).

The Tachograph is a recording device that combines the functions of a clock and a speedometer. A controller (device) is a device used to measure and regulate the speed of a machine, such as a motor (Greek: tele = far away (distant), tacho = speed, graphein = write). A tachograph is a card with a device fitted to a vehicle that automatically records its speed and distance, together with the driver's activity selected from a choice of modes.
The tachograph was a device that monitors speed and driving and rest times. One of the way to record the information is the old method using a paper chart (analogue tachograph). The chart recorder is an electromechanical device that records an electrical or mechanical input trend onto a piece of paper (the chart). Chart recorders may record several inputs using different color pens and may record onto strip charts or circular charts. The tachograph is a device fitted to a vehicle that automatically records its speed and distance, together with the driver's activity selected from a choice of modes. The drive mode is activated automatically when the vehicle is in motion.

A tachometer is an instrument measuring the rotation speed of a shaft or disk, as in a motor or other machine. The device usually displays the revolutions per minute (RPM) on a calibrated analogue dial, but digital displays are increasingly common. The word comes from Greek: Ταχος, tachos, "speed", and metron, "measure".

- The Regulator was a device to measure and regulate the speed to keep constant speed of the spinning machines regardless of load pressure. In automatic control, a regulator is a device which has the function of maintaining a designated characteristic (1931–1933).
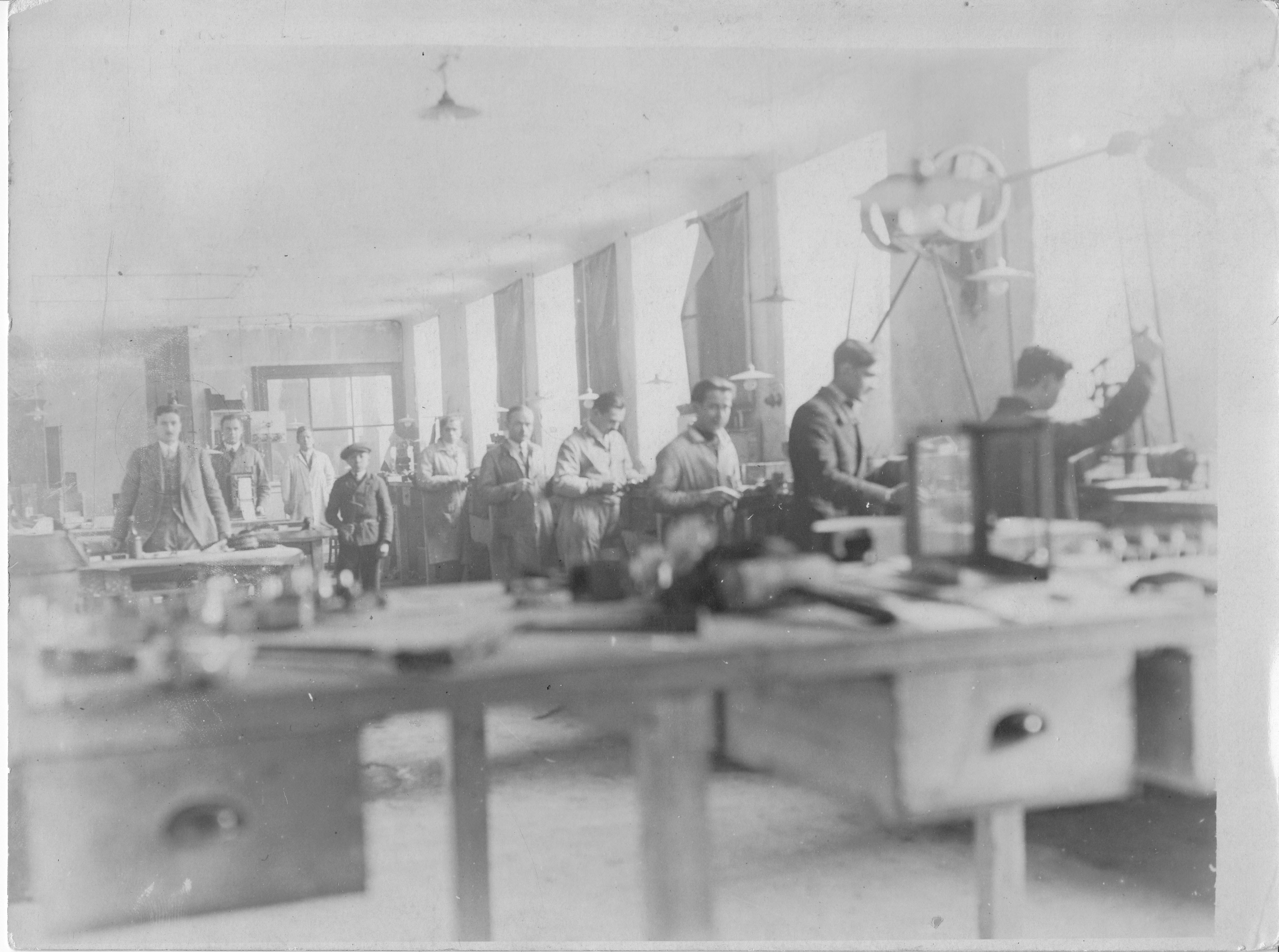
Interior of the fine mechanical workshop in Budapest. Kornél Tolnai leftmost. Photo in 1931.

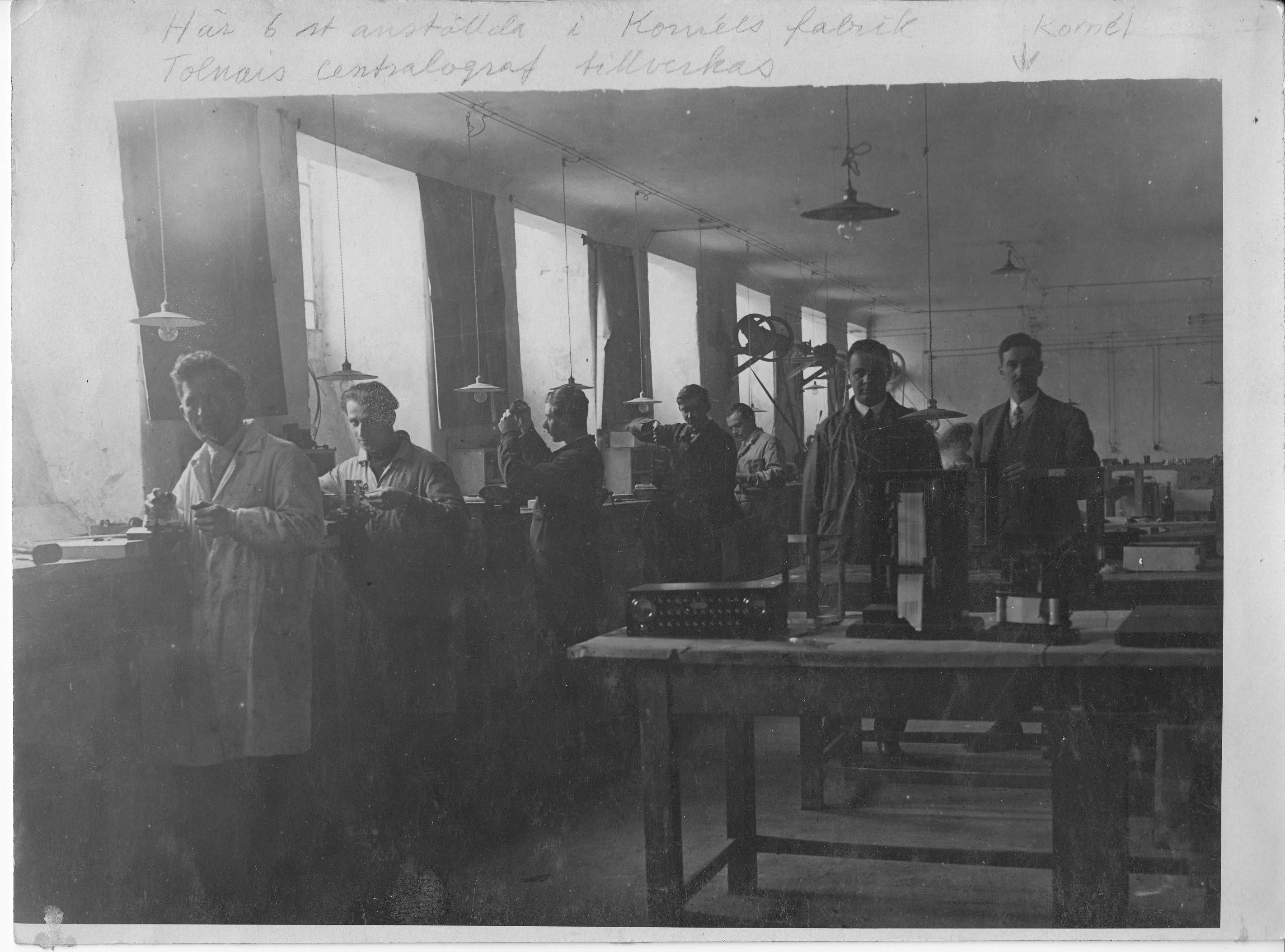
Interior of the fine mechanical workshop in Budapest. Kornél Tolnai furthest to the right. Photo in 1931.

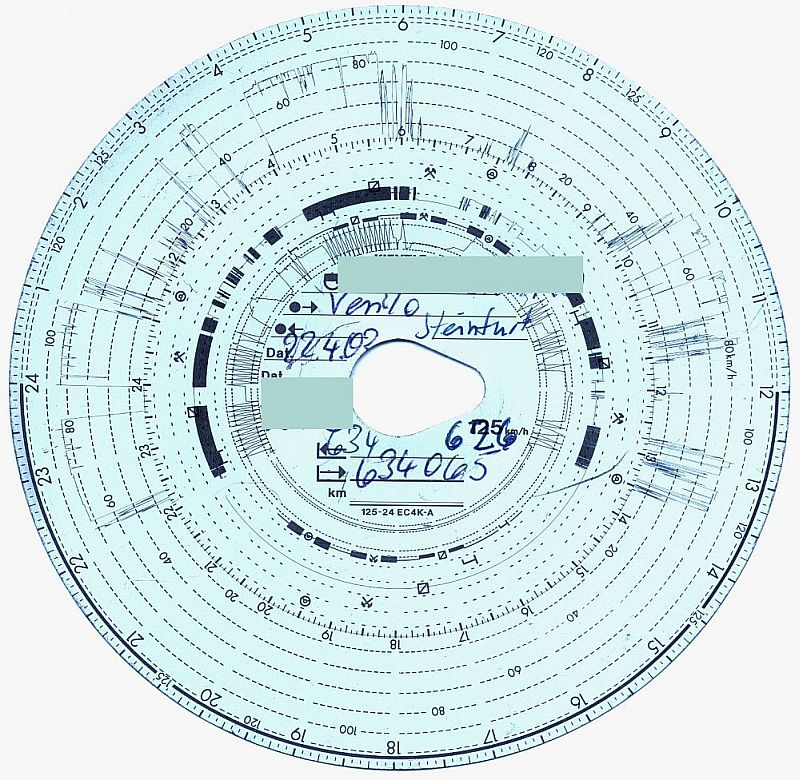
The tachograph is a device fitted to a vehicle that automatically records its speed and distance, together with the driver's activity selected from a choice of modes.

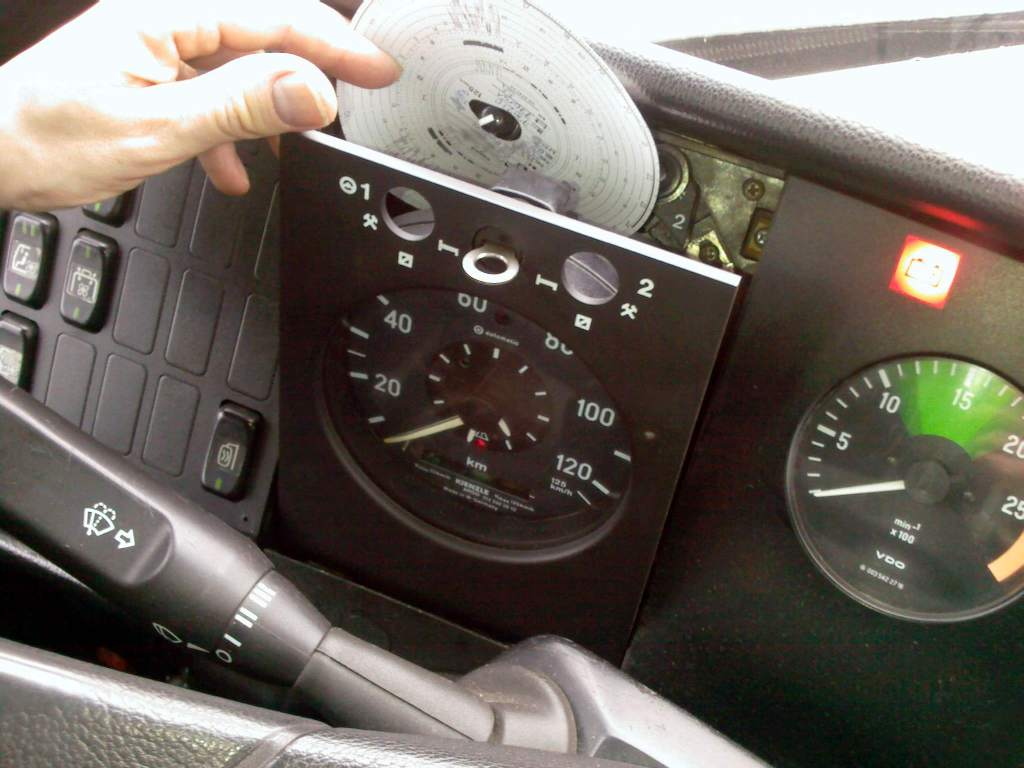
Analogue Tachometer, or Tachograph. A modern tachograph with tachograph chart. Note the teardrop shaped hole as opposed to a round hole.

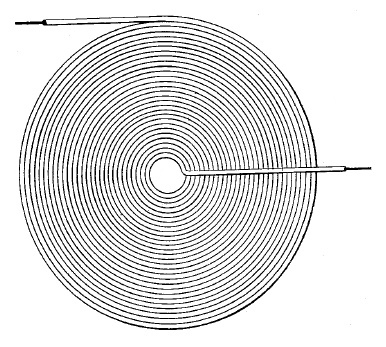
Nicola Tesla's Flat Spiral Coil, 1894.

== Exhibition of his inventions ==
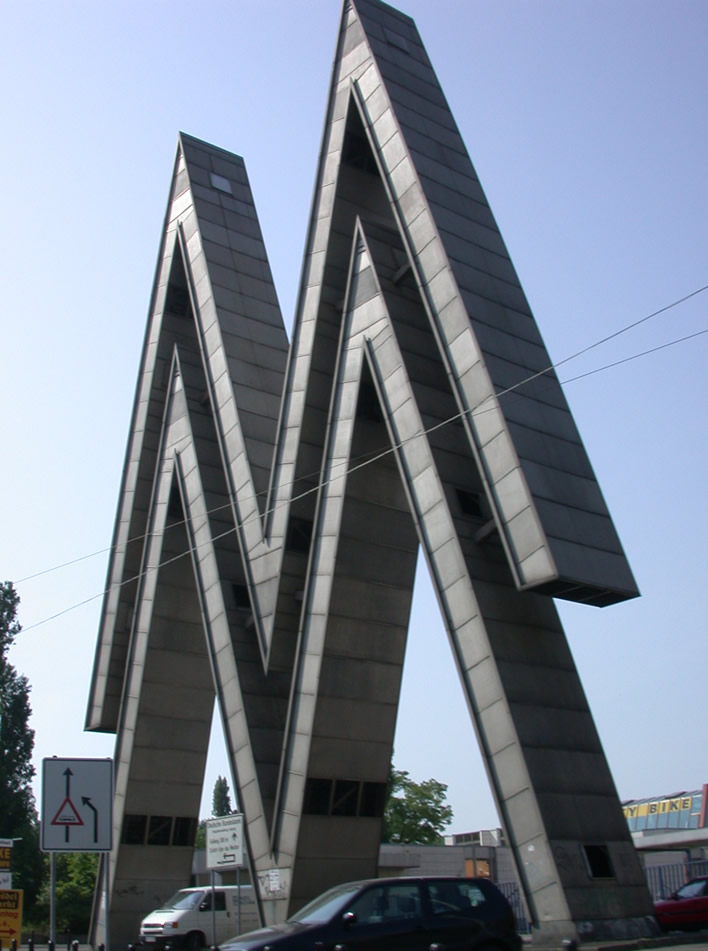
Leipzig Trade Fair logotype at the Alte Messe Leipzig, a double M for Messe, which was the symbol for the Leipzig Trade Fair.

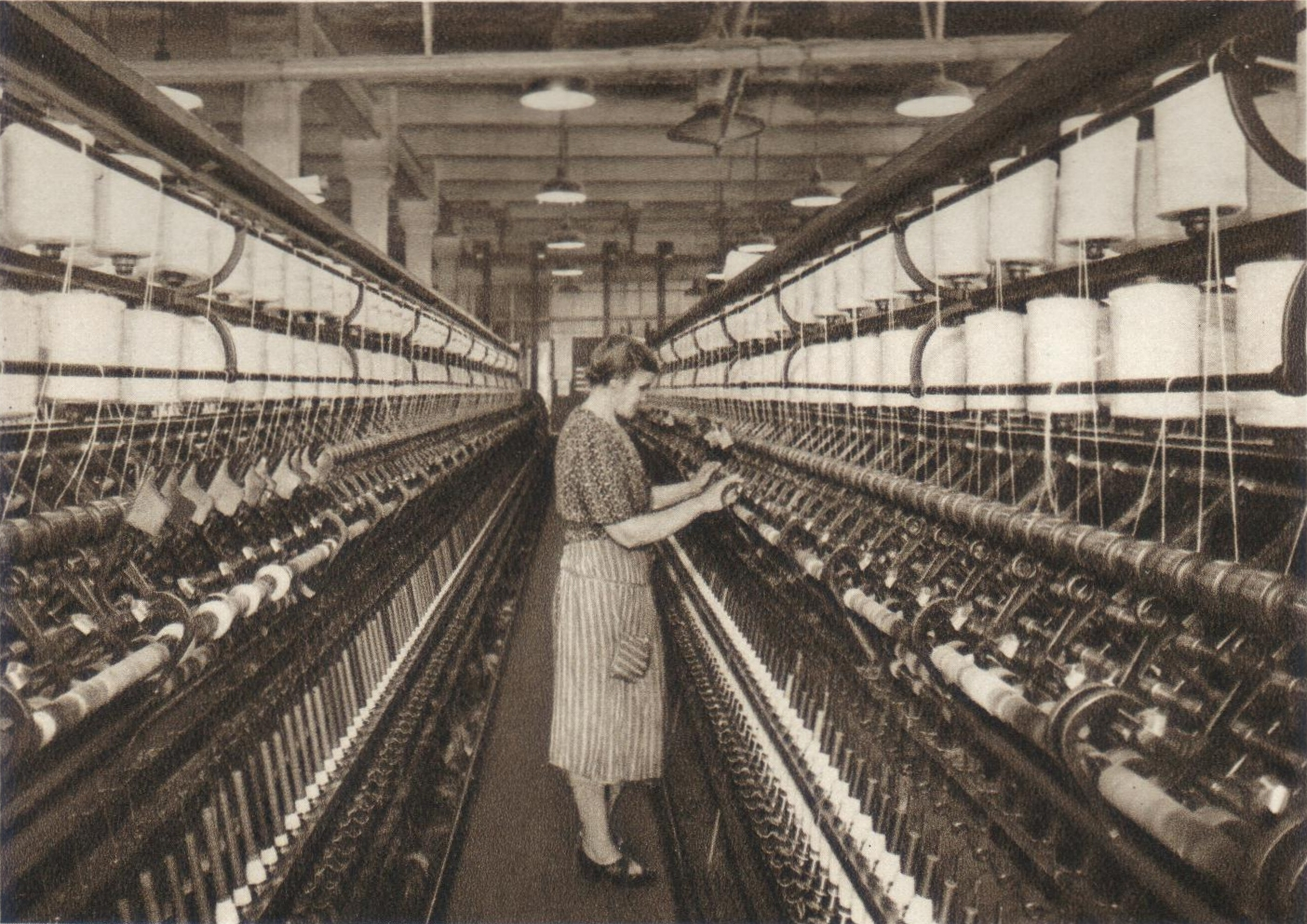
Ring spinning machine for worsted yarn in the 1920s in Norrköping in Sweden. Interior from Drags in Norrköping. Tolnai came into contact with the textile industries in Norrköping in 1930.

In 1930 Kornél Tolnai exhibited his inventions at the Leipzig Trade Fair (German:Leipziger Messe), (English: Leipsic Trade fair), which was a major fair for trade across Central Europe for nearly a millennium, and then he came into contact with the textile industries in Norrköping and Borås. Norrköping developed with the construction of a cotton refinery. It was at the Spring Fair in 1930. The industry in Norrköping, including textile manufacturers, expanded into the 20th century. Borås is the leading textile city of Sweden, starting as a location spot for textile mills. In Borås he established contact with the engineer and executive director of the textile firm AB Hugo Hennig & Company (Sven Bjurqvist), who also was the editor for the Scandinavian Journal of Textile Industry, where some articles of Kornél Tolnai was printed (i.e. No 7-8, 1931). Hugo Hennig also was a member of Flax Cultivation Committee in Sweden. He founded his own agency and machine company in Borås. Over time, the company became, under his sons direction, only a sales agency for a variety of manufacturers of machines and accessories for the textile industry.

In 1931 Kornél Tolnai set out his own inventions and patents at the Leipzig Trade Fair again during the Leipzig Spring Fair in February 1931. Gábor Kornél Tolnai came in contact with the Swedish company Ericsson (LM Ericsson. Telefonaktiebolaget L. M. Ericsson is a telecommunications equipment manufacturer and the company is one of the largest Swedish companies, that provides telecommunications equipment and data communication systems and related services covering a range of technologies.

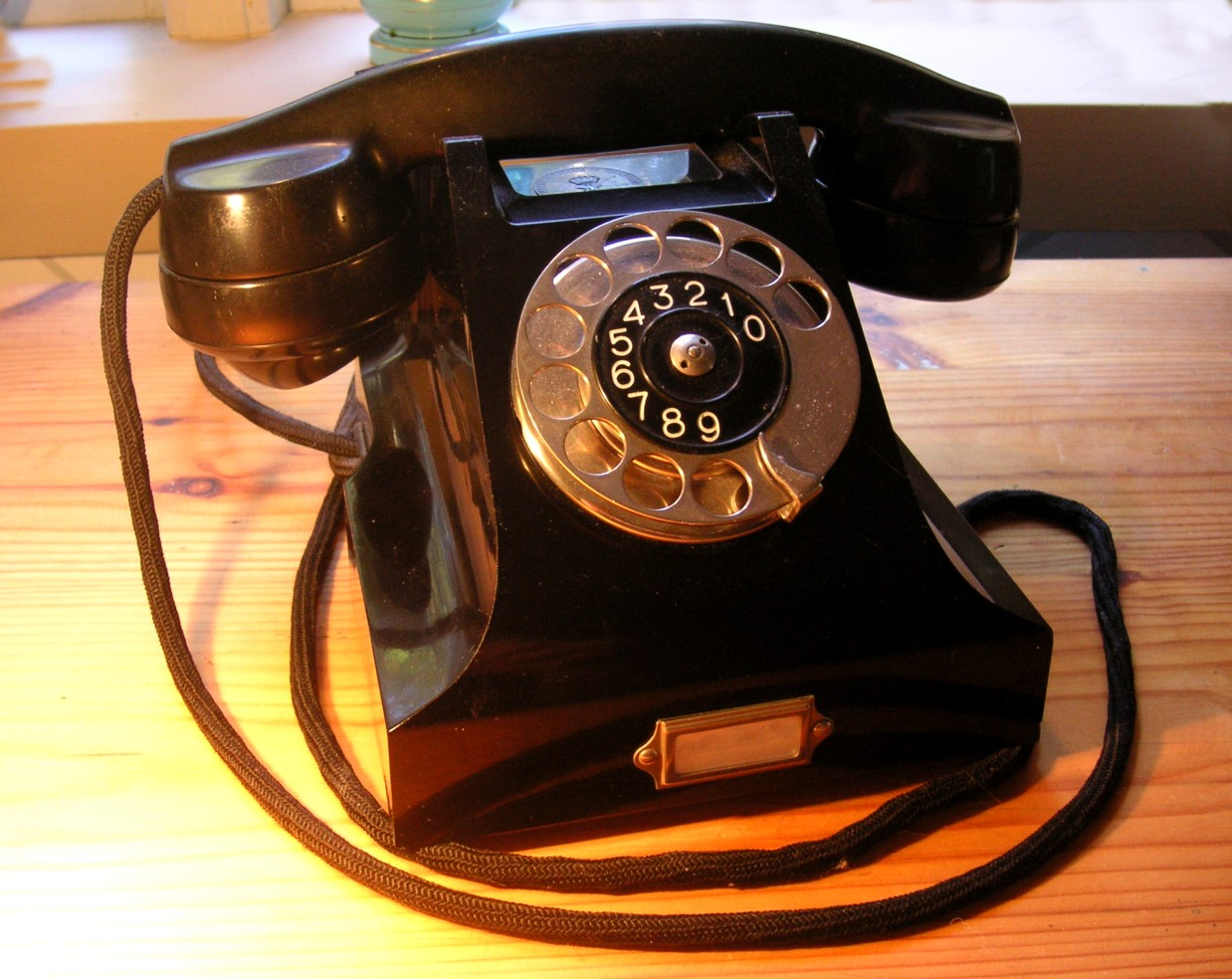
Ericsson Bakelite Telephone, 1931, Ericsson DBH 1001 telephone. This type of telefohone was used between 1931 and 1947. It was the standard telephone in Sweden in the 1940s and 1950s.

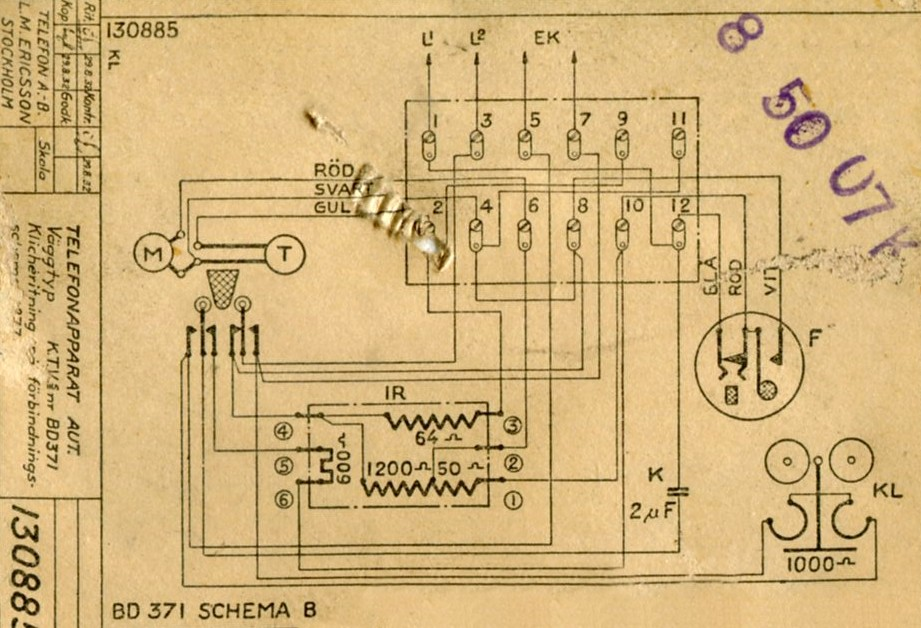
Ericsson Wall Telephone, 1932, wiring diagram.

In the beginning of the 1930s a new material came to dominate the productions of telephones. It was the Bakelite, an early plastic. The plastic was developed by Belgian-born chemist Leo Baekeland in New York in 1907. It was one of the first plastics made from synthetic components.
The United States Patent and Trademark Office granted Baekeland a patent for a "Method of making insoluble products of phenol and formaldehyde" on December 7, 1909.

In 1931 L.M. Ericsson introduced the Bakelite phone, and acquired the patent rights to Tolnai's Centralograph machine-status-recorder. When Ericsson's Bakelite telephone was first distributed worldwide in 1931 it was called the Swedish type of telephone and set the standard for how a modern plastic telephone should look. The distinctive Ericsson styles soon became subdued by the increasing use of moulded thermoplastic phones. Ericsson's innovative bakelite telephone, which was launched in 1931, was primarily known for its trend-setting (early adopter) design, but it also contained an important technical innovation called anti-side tone coupling. The line of telephones, the Ericsson DBH 1001 telephone, was the Bakelite phone, officially also called DBH 1001, m33, N1020 or DE 702, was a Swedish standard telephone bakelite produced in over thirty years between 1931 and 1962.

LM Ericsson bought the rights to the Centralograph from Gábor Kornél Tolnai and accordingly they acquired the patent rights from him. The procedure for granting patents, requirements placed on the patentee, and the extent of the exclusive rights vary widely between countries according to national laws and international agreements. A patent is a set of exclusive rights granted by a sovereign state to an inventor or their assignee for a limited period of time, in exchange for the public disclosure of the invention. An invention is a solution to a specific technological problem, and may be a product or a process. Patents are a form of intellectual property. Intellectual property (IP) is a legal concept for creations of the mind for which exclusive rights are recognized.

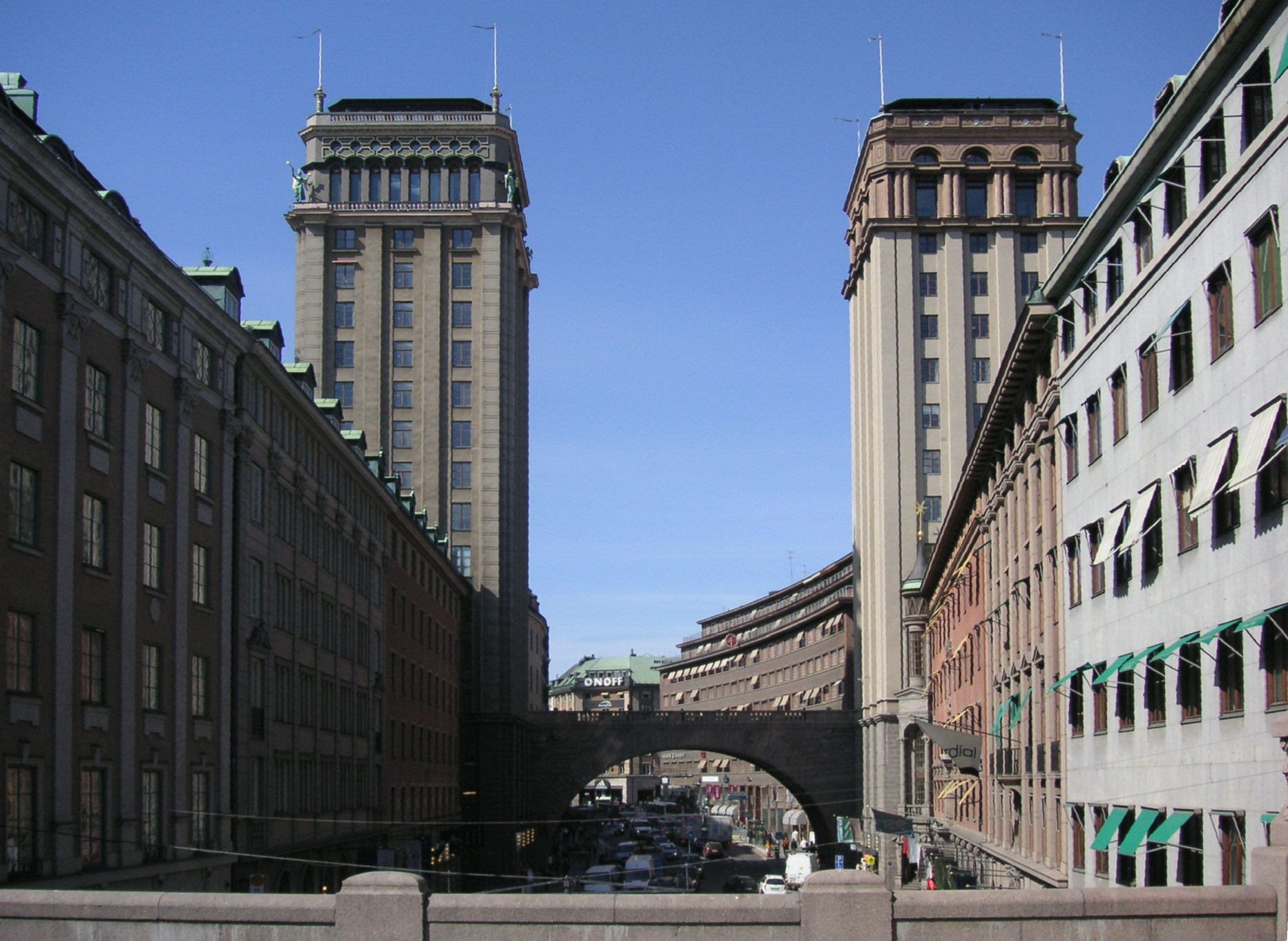
Kungsgatan in Stockholm. The South Kings' Tower to the left and the North Kings' Tower to the right.

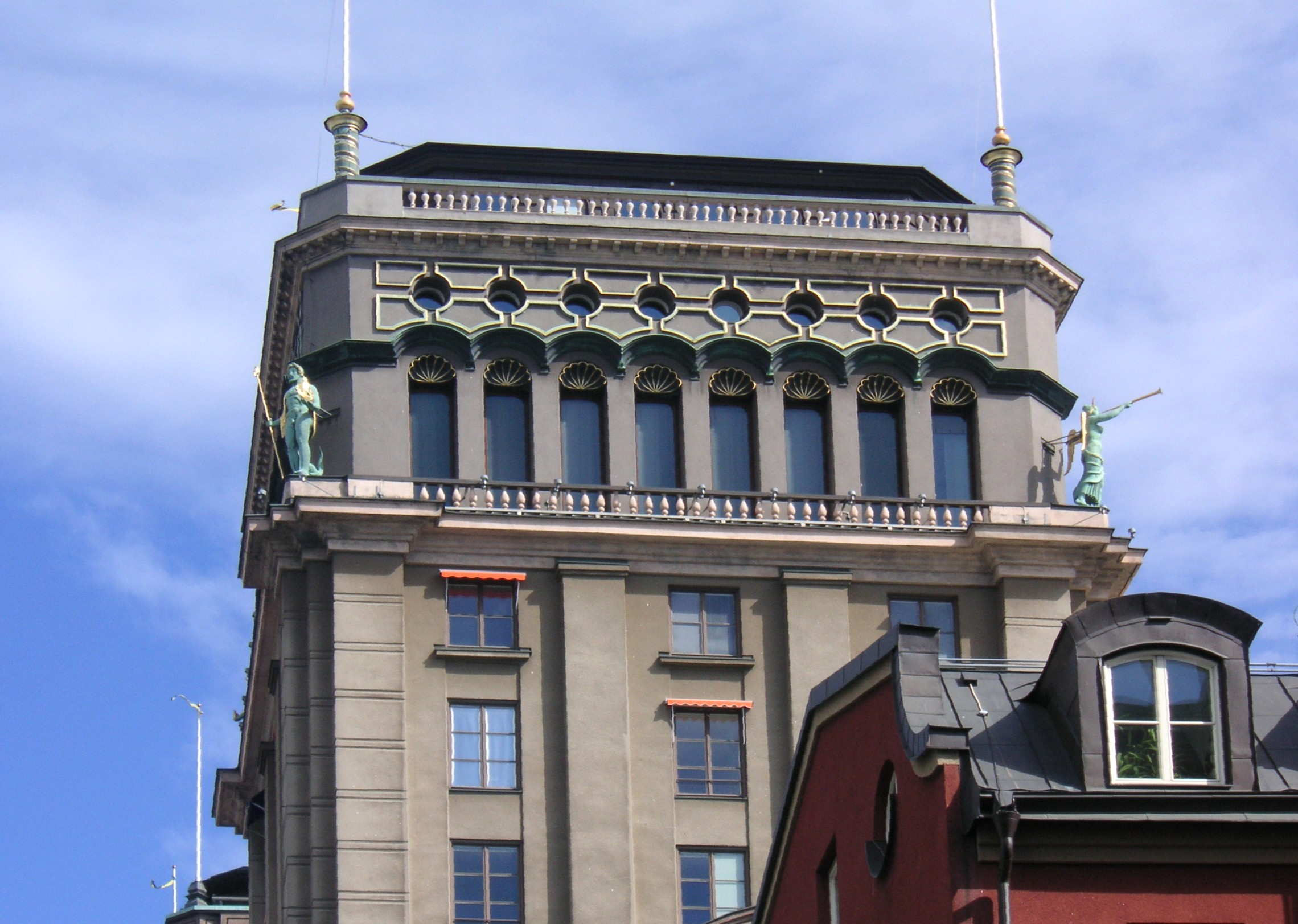
The top of the South Kings' Tower in Kungsgatan in Stockholm, where Ericsson had their office.

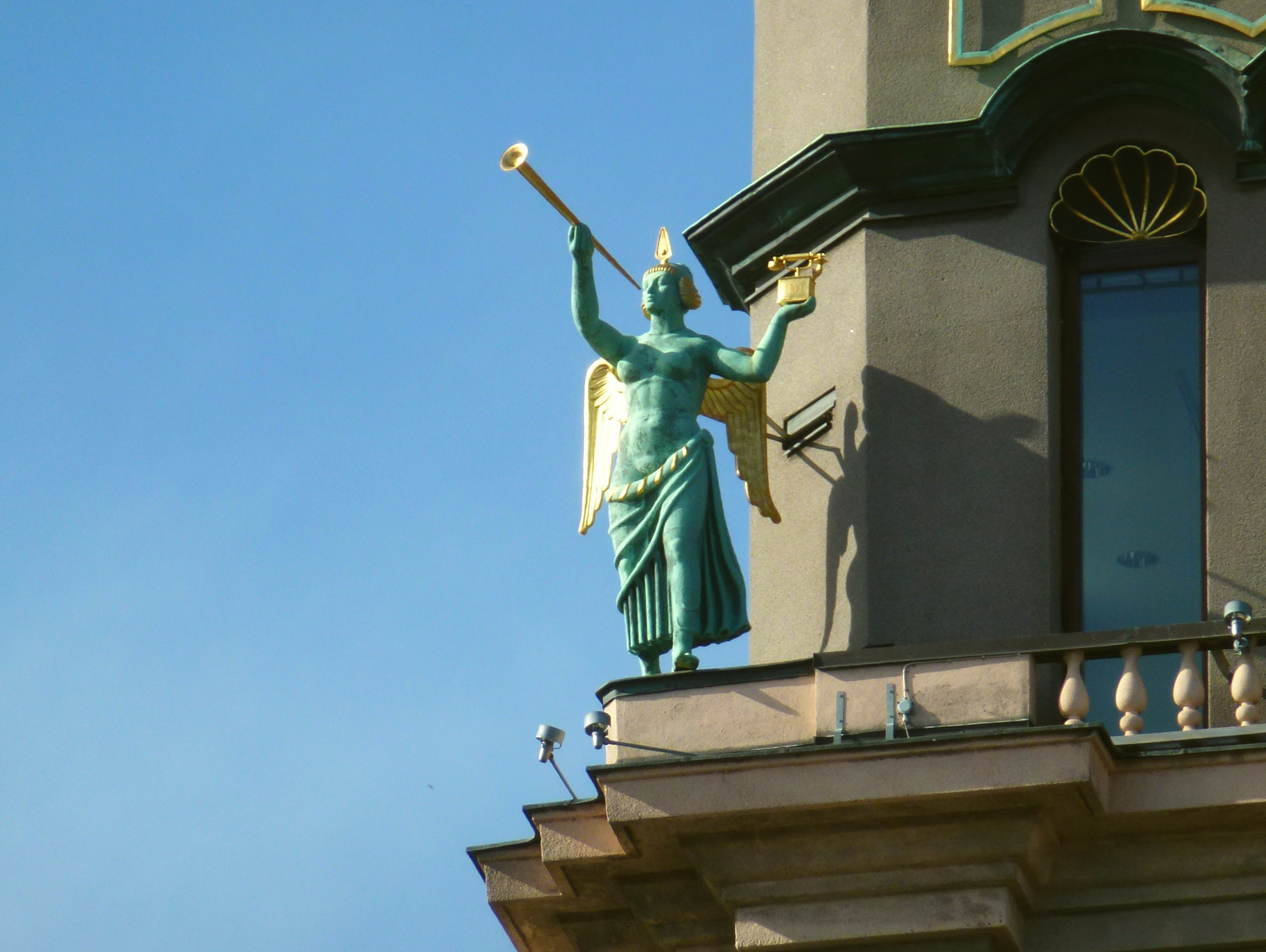
Detail, South Tower, Angel "Victoria" with an Ericsson phone with the phrase "LME".

When LM Ericsson had bought Tolnai's patents Kornél Tolnai became an employee of LM Ericsson, both in Stockholm and in Budapest in 1930–1931. In Stockholm Ericsson had an office on Döbelnsgatan 18 with workshops on Thulegatan 5, 15, 17 and 19 and in Budapest Ericsson had a branch with workshops and offices on Vörösmarty útca 67, Budapest VI, in the district of Terézváros, an office building located in the 6th district near to Budapest-Nyugati Railway Terminal (Hungarian: Budapest-Nyugati pályaudvar; English: Budapest Western railway station), in the historical heart of Budapest. It lies at the intersection of Grand Boulevard and Váci Avenue. It was the Hungarian Electricity A.G. Ex Deckert and Homolka. Ericsson, the full name of Telefonaktiebolaget L.M. Ericsson, is a Swedish telecommunications company with an international focus.

Ericsson was founded in 1876 by Lars Magnus Ericsson (1846–1926). The company Ericsson that operated the Hungarian plant was named Ericsson Ungarische Elektrizitäts Aktiengesellschaft. The address at that time in Budapest was Fehévari-út 70, I. Budapest in the district of Budavár. Ericsson Factories and Offices in Sweden, Ericsson Telephone Ltd. Telephone Engineers and Manufacturers, were in 14 countries. In Stockholm Ericsson had an office in Kungsgatan 31-33 in the Södra Kungstornet, the "South Kings' Tower", one of the two Kungstornen (English: Kings' Towers) in Stockholm.

During the 1930s Kornél Tolnai sometimes had his meetings with the L. M. Ericsson board of directors in the South Kings' Tower in Kungsgatan 33, as the company had until 1940 its representative office here. The South Kings' Tower is one of the two towers, it is a 17-storey and 61 m (200 ft) and was built between 1924 and 1925. Together, they are considered the first modern skyscrapers in Europe. The South Kings' Tower was adorned with four towers figures from Roman mythology (Fortuna, Mercury, Neptune and Victoria) created by sculptor Aron Sandberg. Constructor was L. M. Ericsson's real estate company, and the company had until 1940 its representative office here. If you look closely at the tower figures you will see that one of them (Victoria) carries a gilded Ericsson phone with the letters "LME". In the top of the tower was until 1963 the restaurant Pagod which was a temperance restaurant, decorated by Aaron Sandberg in Chinese theme, which was run by the Salvation Army.

The plant in Budapest continued to report a profit during the 1920s, since the Hungarian PTT placed half of its orders for telephone equipment with Ericsson. The company expected major orders for automatic systems during the 1930s, but the depression dashed these hopes.

=== Lecture in Budapest in 1934 ===
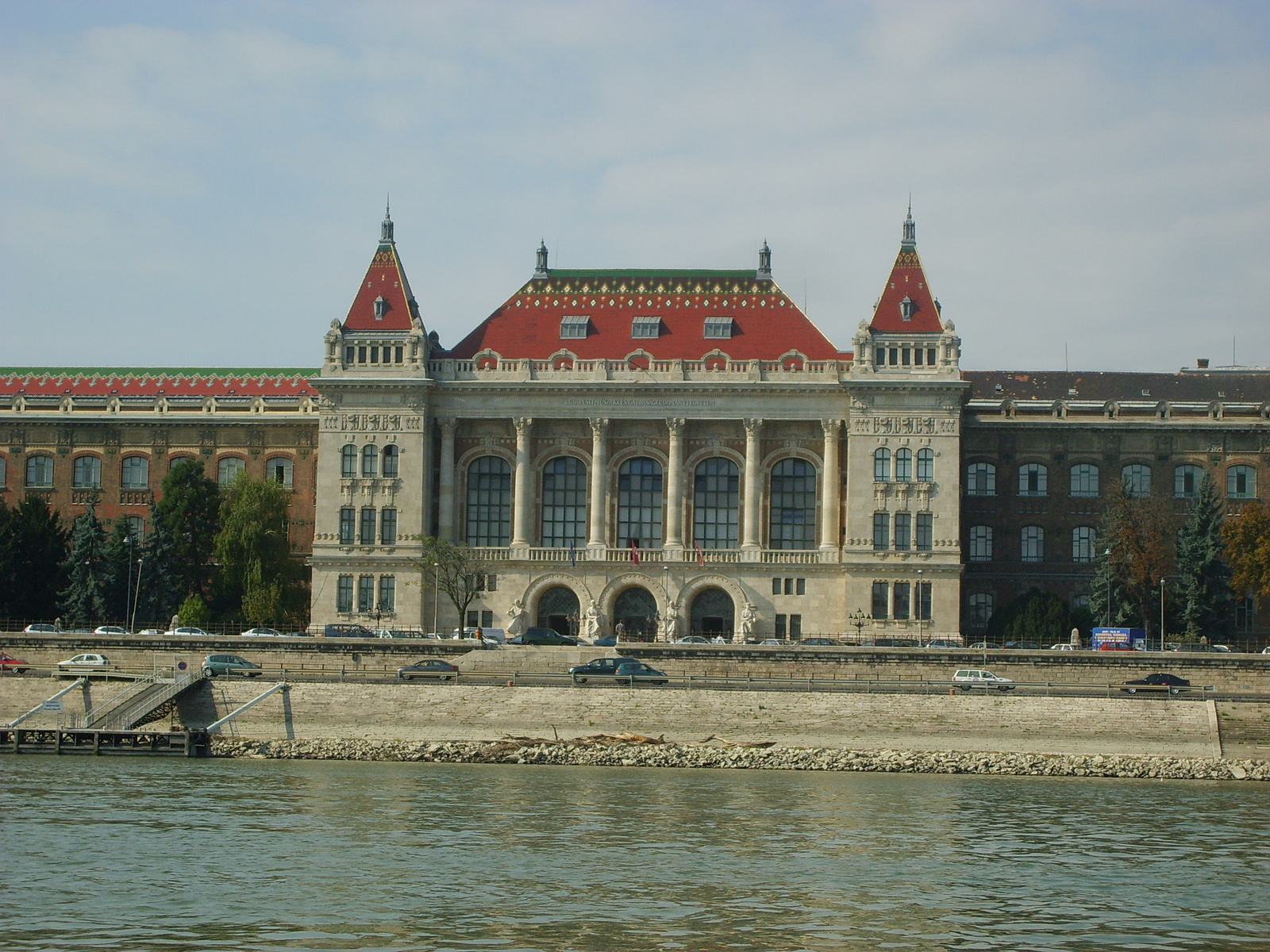
Budapest University of Technology and Economics in Budapest.

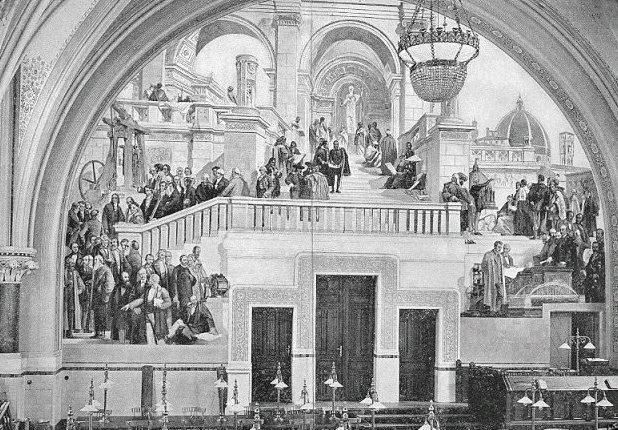
Former fresco in the building of Library of the Budapest University of Technology and Economics, Hungary (1922).

In the Skandinavisk Tidskrift för Textilindustri (Scandinavian Journal of Textile Industry), N:o 7-8, 1931, which was printed at AB Borås Tidningstryckeri in Swedish, there was an article about Kornél Tolnai's invention with text and pictures. The title of the article was A valuable tool for rationalization of industrial operation, Business professionals, investors and manufacturers insist on an economic production. (In Swedish: Ett värdefullt hjälpmedel vid rationalisering av industriell drift, Affärslivet, aktieägare och fabrikanter yrka på en ekonomisk produktion.) The responsible publisher for the publication, a trade technical journal, was Hugo Hennig from the textile factory in Borås. The Teletachograf and the Centralograf were put together, as for example in the office of the manager of the spinning mill in the big cotton firm Leó Goldbergers textilfabrik (Goldberger Textilművek Rt.) in Budapest. Here was also System Tolnai connected to a control plant in the ringspinning hall.

In 1934, ten years after his exam in 1924 at the Budapest University of Technology and Economics, Kornél Tolnai had a lecture about his inventions Teletachograf and Centralograf at the Budapest University of Technology and Economics (Hungarian: Budapesti Műszaki és Gazdaságtudományi Egyetem, BME). The title of the lecture was Efficiency Improvement of the Textile Industry. The lecture had the same information as was printed in the Hungarian trade technical journal "Magyar Textiltechnologusok Lapja", May 25, 1934 "TEXTIL-IPAR", Budapest. At that time, in 1934, the technical highschool in Budapest was named Royal Joseph Technical University. It was reorganized in 1871 and was elevated to equal rank with other universities in the country. In 1910 it moved to its current site near Gellért square (next to the Art Nouveau Hotel Gellért). In 1934 it was reorganized again as Palatine Joseph University of Technology and Economics and it played a dominant role in the interwar industrialization process, together with engineering and economist training in Hungary. In Hungarian the name of the highschool was M. kir. József nádor Műszaki és Gazdaságtudományi Egyetemet. In Hungarian the school is abbreviated as BME, English official abbreviation BME, is the most significant University of Technology in Hungary and is also one of the oldest Institutes of Technology in the world.

== Constructions for the military ==
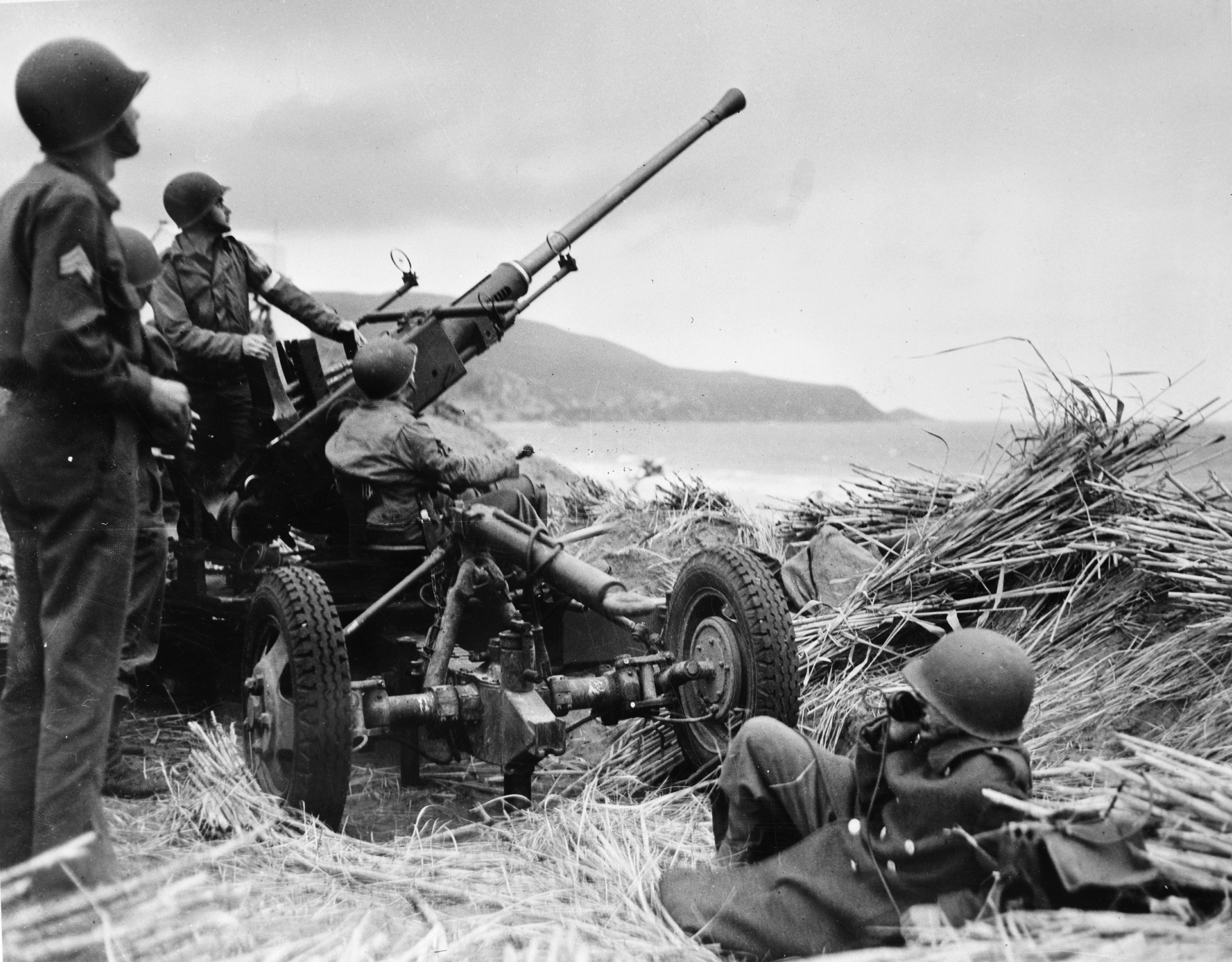
Anti-aircraft Bofors 40 mm gun. Created/published 1943. The picture shows a United States anti-aircraft artillery crew in position.

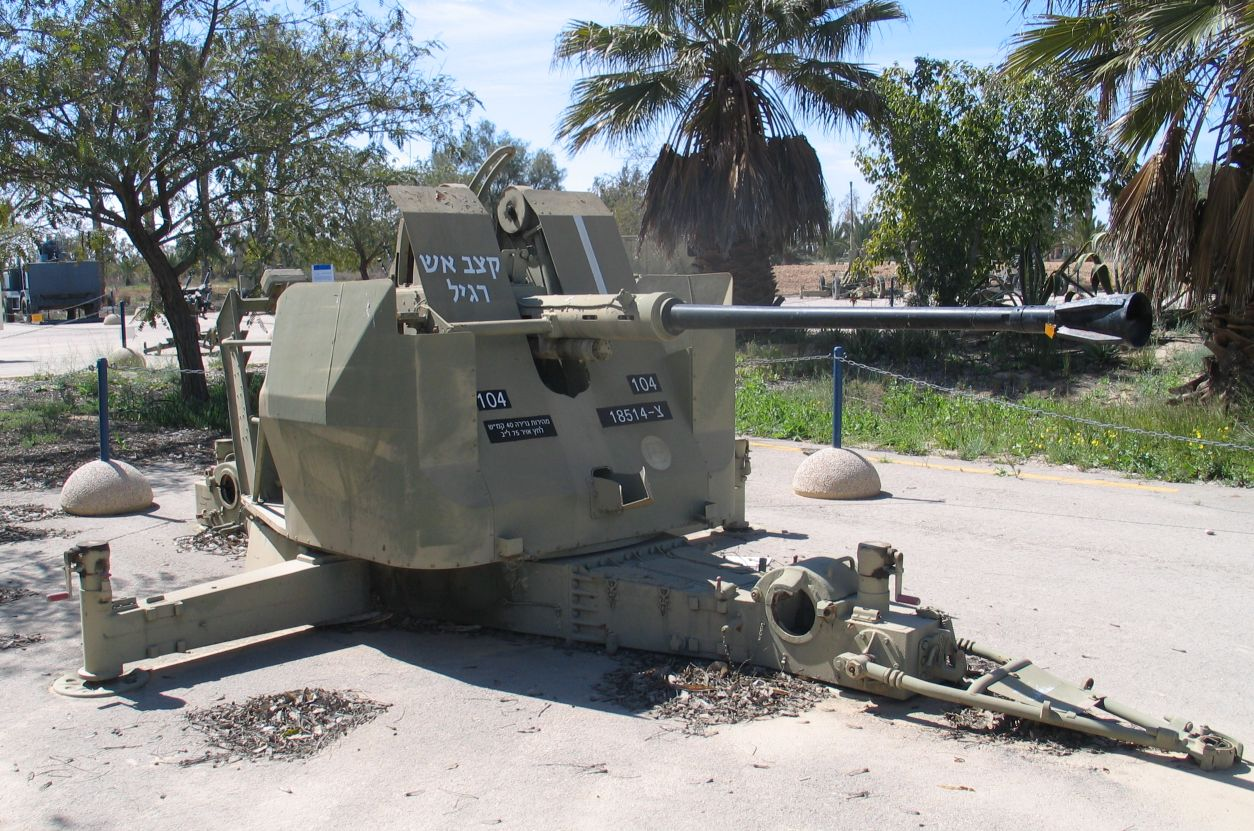
Bofors 40 mm L70 AA gun anti-aircraft autocannon, developed and manufactured by Bofors and manufactured under licens worldwide.

In 1935 Kornél Tolnai established an experimental workshop in Stockholm, Arago, on Tjärhovsgatan 23 in Södermalm. He built models and measuring instruments and was doing constructions and inventions, some of which led to patents.

=== Impulse Engine ===
At this time he constructed a couple of his most successful inventions for military anti-aircraft defence. The invention was a tempering machine for anti-aircraft guns and it was introduced for military anti-aircraft instrumentation. Among other things, he collaborated with AB Bofors about his invention Impulse engine, a tempering machine for anti-aircraft autocannons. The Bofors 40 mm air-craft gun, often referred to simply as the Bofors gun, is an anti-aircraft/multi-purpose autocannon designed in the 1930s by the Swedish arms manufacturer AB Bofors. It was one of the most popular medium-weight anti-aircraft systems during World War II. In the mid-1930s the foundation for the company's most famous product was laid, the Bofors 40 mm automatic cannon, which during World War II were produced in different countries in 10,000 numbers of copies.

An autocannon is a rapid-fire projectile weapon firing a shell as opposed to the bullet fired by a machine cannon. AB Bofors was a Swedish industrial company and arms manufacturers headquartered in the town of Karlskoga in Örebro County in Värmland. In late 19th century Karlskoga was transformed from iron works to a manufacturer of cannon and in the 20th century a more diversified defense industry. The most famous owner of the Swedish company Bofors, located in Karlskoga, was Alfred Nobel who owned the company from 1894 until his death in December 1896. He had the key role in reshaping the iron manufacturer to a modern cannon manufacturer and chemical industry. The name Bofors has been associated with the iron industry for more than 350 years.

Bofors was initially a general iron and steel use, and was to become an arms manufacturers in the late 1800s when technology developments within the field cannon meant that the new steel grades and manufacturing techniques were used. The Bofors 40 mm gun is a famous anti-aircraft autocannon designed by the Swedish firm Bofors. It was one of the most popular medium-weight anti-aircraft systems during World War II, used by most of the western Allies as well as various other forces. It is often referred to simply as the Bofors gun. The name Bofors has been associated with the iron industry for more than 350 years. It is located in Karlskoga, Sweden, and it originates from the hammer mill "Boofors" founded 1646. The company was founded in 1873.

=== Reportoskop ===
Kornél Tolnai did his own experiments in his own workshop in Södermalm in Stockholm. In 1936 he made his own invention, Reportoskop, which he has built and in Berlin he demonstrated it right when the 1936 Summer Olympics in Berlin took place. Tolnai had built his invention Reportoskop and he demonstrated it during the Olympic Games in Berlin on August 1–16, it should he used to follow an athlete (sportsman), for instance a runner on the running track. It took almost forty years before he, in 1975, received a patent for his Reportoskop.

== Central Instrument ==
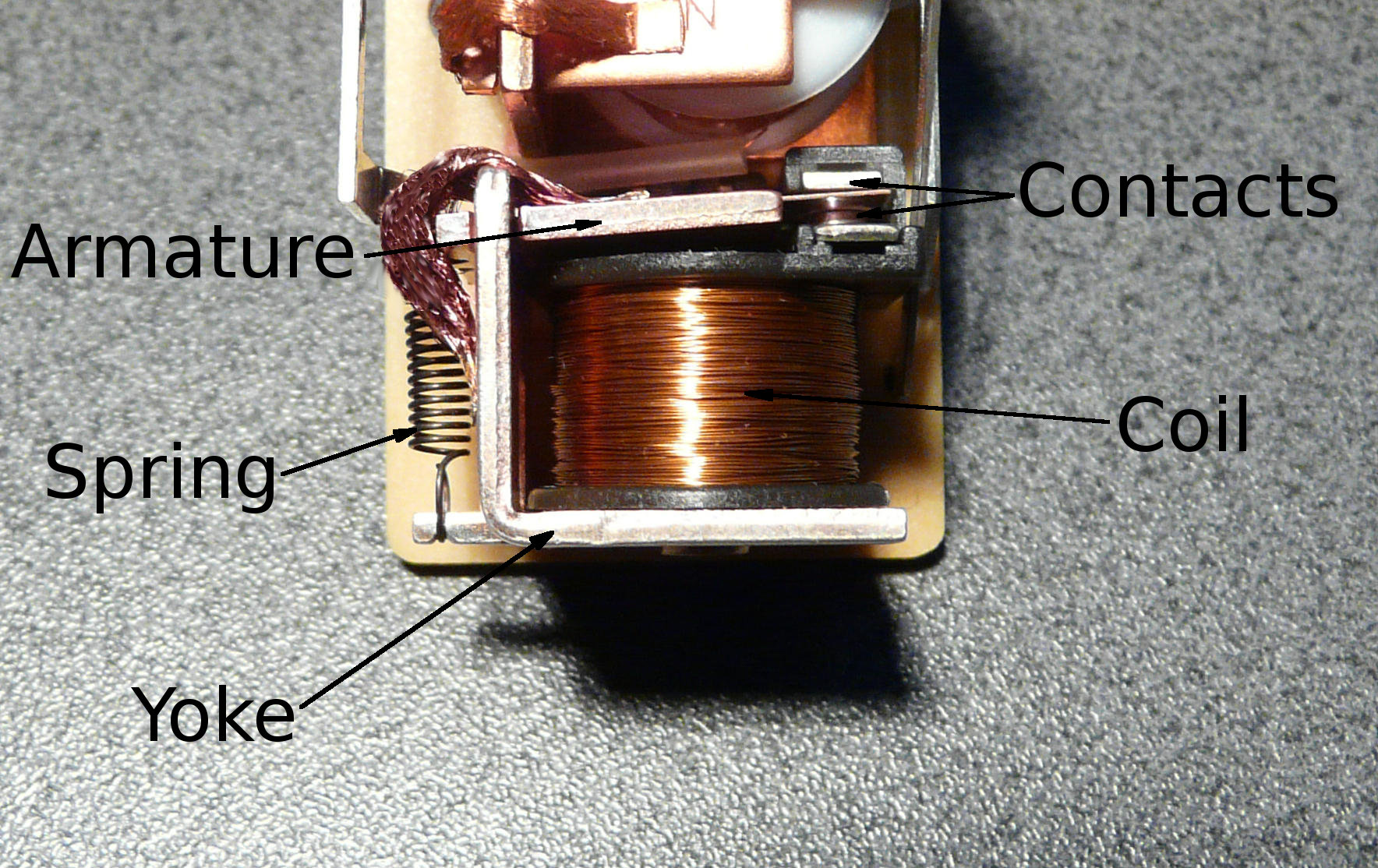
Picture of a simple electromechanical relay with the main parts named.

In 1937–1938, Tolnai had several temporary assignments for the army administration in Sweden, which exploited his patents for, among others, including driving relay, an electrically operated switch, which then became part of his construction of the Central Instrument (key instrument). Many relays use an electromagnet to operate a switching mechanism mechanically, but other operating principles are also used. The structure is used to measure one or more physical quantities. In terms of the basic physical tasks required, a driver must be able to control direction, acceleration, and deceleration. A latching relay has two relaxed states (bistable). These are also called "impulse", "keep", or "stay" relays.

- Central Instrument, a key instrument that is a calculator that calculates how weapons should be directed to hit a target. The first key instruments developed in the early 1900s. Until the mid 1900s consisted of analogue mechanical calculators. Nowadays they consist of computers and used for all types of weapons systems. Anti-aircraft defense must quickly and accurately align the cannons and other artillery before introducing air defense computers (main instrument) and remote control. Flight speeds increased during World War II. This hampered the optical detection, recognition and tracking, but the fire control radar air defense could retain and expand their firepower. A fire-control system is a number of components working together, usually a gun data computer, a director, and radar, which is designed to assist a weapon system in hitting its target. It performs the same task as a human gunner firing a weapon, but attempts to do so faster and more accurately.

Tolnai constructed the Rapportoskop, a Central Instrument for anti-aircraft cannons (1937) which was patented by Arenco in 12 countries (1937–1939), Royal Swedish Army Materiel Administration, Royal Army Ordnance Depot Department Administration, 1938. Rapportoskop was commissioned in 1938, this design was the beginning of the Central Instrument of Arenco.

- Fire Control, an anti-aircraft defense must quickly and accurately align the cannons and other artillery before introducing air defense computers (main instrument) and remote control. Flight speeds increased during World War II. This hampered the optical detection, recognition and tracking, but the fire control radar air defense could retain and expand their firepower.

Anti-aircraft defense must quickly and accurately align the cannons and other artillery before introducing air defense computers (main instrument) and remote control. Flight speeds increased during World War II. This hampered the optical detection, recognition and tracking, but the fire control radar air defense could retain and expand their firepower.

In 1949 Tolnai constructed the Central Instrument (Model Tolnai), the central instrument for anti-aircraft cannons, Royal Swedish Army Materiel Administration, Royal Army Ordnance Department Administration, 1949 edition.

== Inventor and constructor of the 1940s ==
In 1939–1949 Tolnai was an employee of AB Gerh. Arehns Mekaniska Verkstad (AB Gerhard Arehn Engineering Workshop) on Alströmergatan 15 and 17 in Kungsholmen in Stockholm, later Arenco AB, as inventor and constructor, and there Gábor Kornél Tolnai built the Swedish army's new central instrument for anti-aircraft cannons ("Rapportoskop"). He invented a key instrument for anti-aircraft cannons (Arenco). Arenco AB is a Swedish industrial company that produces, among other things, packaging machines. Arenco was incorporated in Svenska Tändsticks AB (STAB) in 1917 with a diversified product range covering, apart from match machinery, also packaging and fish processing machines. The quality of the products has always been considered to be in top position. Diploma engineer Ernst von Segebaden was an engineer in Arenco AB from 1912, and then he was the director of Arenco in 1949–1955.

== Construction of own tape recorders and "Tolnai Study Master" of the 1950s ==
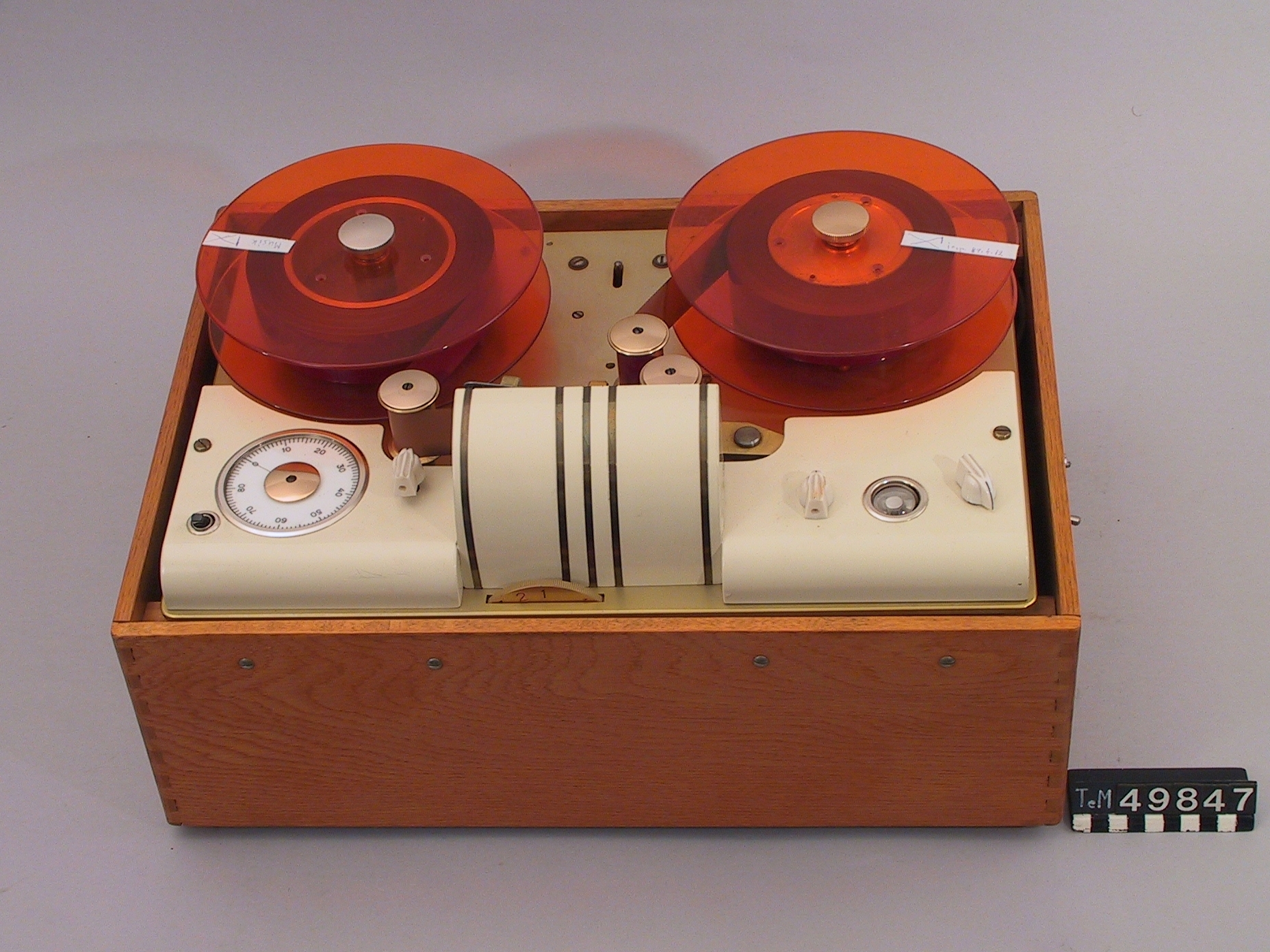
Tolnai "LP20", Long Playing Tape Recorder with 20 tracks, which was developed by Kornél Tolnai in the middle of the 1950s and was manufactured until the late 1960s. Swedish National Museum of Science and Technology in Stockholm, the technical museum in Stockholm. There is also one tape recorder in Centrum för Näringslivshistoria in Stockholm.

Gábor Kornél Tolnai started in 1950 AB G.K. Tolnai his own workshop and laboratory in Stockholm. The rooms was an area where he provided the tools and machinery that was required for the manufacturing the apparatus.

During the years 1950–1977 Kornél Tolnai ran his own company together with a few employees, at first on Främlingsvägen 47 in Hägersten, and then on Hälsingegatan 6 in Vasastan, both in Stockholm.

== Hanover Fair ==
As a self-employer Tolnai regularly visited several industrial fairs in the 1950s, 1960s and 1970s, especially Hanover Fair (German: Hannover Messe), to exhibit his equipment and to market them. In 1964 he visited the World Expo in Chicago to promote his tape recorders.

The Hanover Fair is the world's biggest industrial fair. It is held on the Hanover fairground in Hanover in Germany. Typically, there are about 6,000 exhibitors and 200,000 visitors. The Hannover Messe started in 1947 to boost the economic advancement of post-war Germany. At first, almost everyone was skeptical about Hannover's chances of overtaking Leipzig – the former "exhibition capital" of the defunct German Reich. But in the years that followed, the Hanover Fair became a symbol of Germany's economic miracle. The fair proved hugely successful and was hence repeated on a yearly basis, contributing largely to the success of the Hanover fairground in replacing the then-East German city of Leipzig as the new major fair city for West Germany.

Back in 1948, the first telephone connection was established between the trade fair company and New York. A revolution in wireless telecommunications began in the first decade of the 1900s with pioneering developments in radio communications.

In 1950, the first exhibitors from abroad took part in the renamed "Deutsche Industrie-Messe" ("German Industrial Fair") and, in 1961, the term "Hanover Fair" was officially adopted. It soon became famous, world-class event for cross-communication between technology and industry.

== Construction of Tape Recorders ==
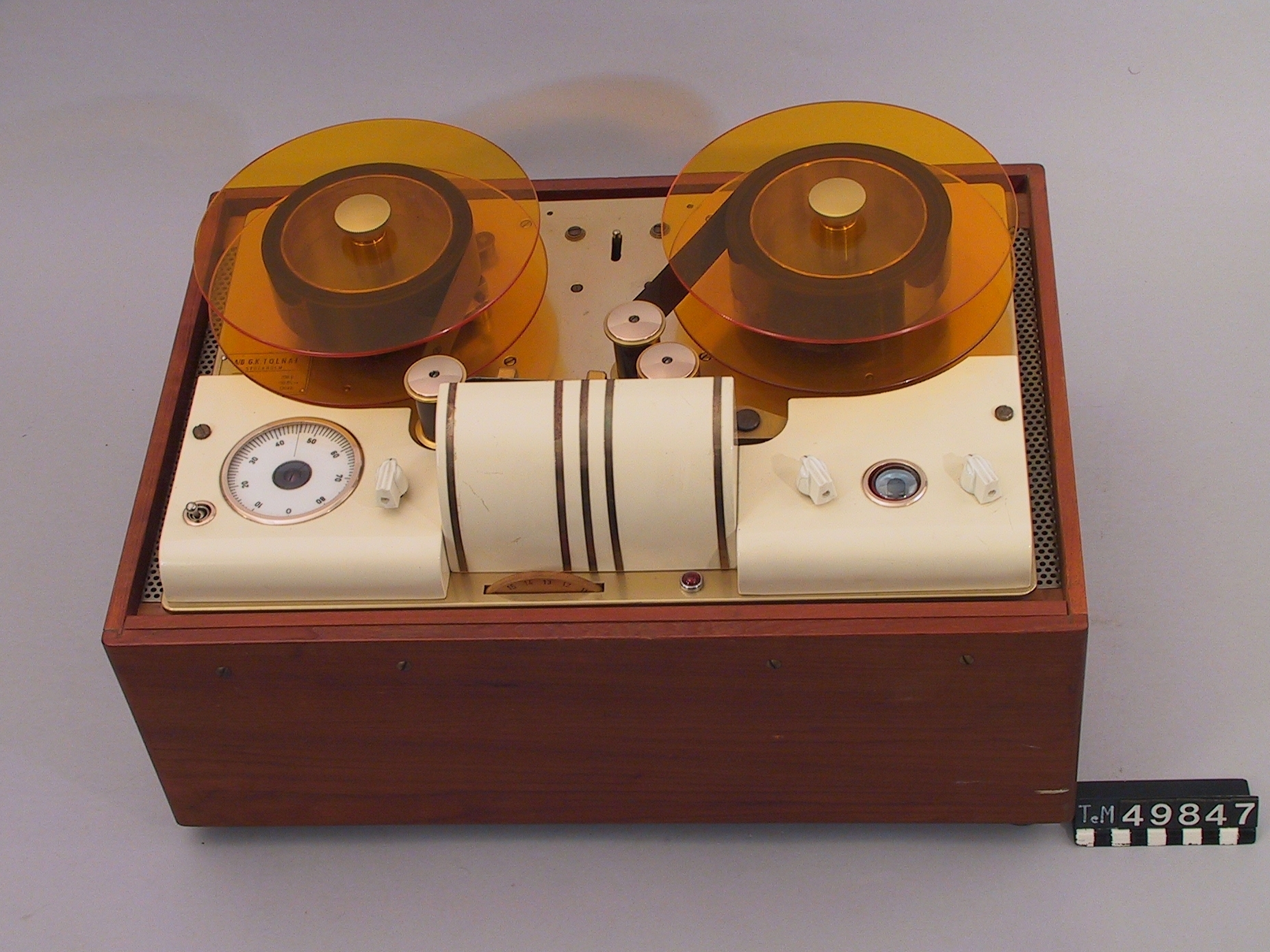
Tolnai "LP16", Standard. Long Playing Tape Recorder with 16 tracks på 35 mm tape, playing time 16 hours, which was developed by Kornél Tolnai in the middle of the 1950s and was manufactured until the late 1960s. Swedish National Museum of Science and Technology in Stockholm (Swedish: Tekniska museet).

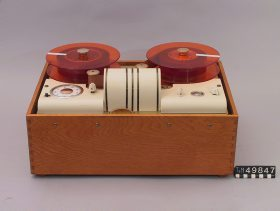
Tolnai "LP20", Long Playing Tape Recorder with 20 tracks, which was developed by Kornél Tolnai in the middle of the 1950s and was manufactured until the late 1960s. Swedish National Museum of Science and Technology in Stockholm (Swedish: Tekniska museet).

Gábor Kornél Tolnai began to construct his own tape recorders In the early 1950s when tape technology penetrated. A tape recorder, or tape machine, is an audio-storage device that records and plays back sound, usually using magnetic tape. Magnetic tape transformed the recording industry, and by the late 1950s the vast majority of commercial recordings were being mastered on tape.

Kornél Tolnai assumed already invented wire players and developed the design. Some companies were known for their excellent quality reel-to-reel tape recorders, i.e. Tandberg and Revox. Tandberg is a manufacturer of videoconferencing systems, located in Oslo, Norway (product development, sales and distribution) and New York City, United States (sales and distribution). Tandberg Radiofabrikk is now owned by LM Ericsson and the factories manufactured radios, computer equipment, language laboratories, television, tape recorders and stereo equipment. Tandberg built during the 50- and 60-century a global reputation in the fields of radio, television and tape recorders. In the 1950s and 1960s was Tandberg's tape recorder to be among the best. The magnetic tape which was in use in the 1950s–1970s was 7-inch reel 1/4-inch-wide audio recording tapes, which were the prevalent and typical of consumer use. ReVox is a brand name of Swiss audio equipment created by Studer in the 1950s.

Kornél Tolnai constructed tape recorder for cafés, known as café machines. He designed and received patents on a tape recorder with a wide band up to 40-hour channels. Standard models are called "LP16" with 16 channels on 35 mm tape, duration 16 hours, Special versions "LP24" with 24 channels on 50 mm tape, duration 24 hours and Special versions "LP28" with 28 channels on 35 mm tape, duration 28 hours and Super "LP28" with 16-28 channels with variable channel width, duration 16–28 hours.

Kornél Tolnai sought to get the perfect stereophonic sound (Greek, stereos = "solid" and phōnē ="sound"), commonly called "stereo", on new constructions of tape recorders. Stereo or stereophonic sound is the reproduction of sound using two or more independent audio channels through a symmetrical configuration of loudspeakers in such a way as to create the impression of sound heard from various directions, as in natural hearing. It is often contrasted with monophonic, or "mono" sound, where audio is in the form of one channel, often centered in the sound field (analogous to a visual field).

Sound recording and reproduction is an electrical or mechanical inscription and re-creation of sound waves, such as spoken voice, singing, instrumental music, or sound effects. The two main classes of sound recording technology are analog recording and digital recording. Analog (or analogue) recording (Greek, ana = "according to" and logos = "relationship") is a technique used to store signals of audio or video information for later playback. In digital recording, the analog signal of video or sound is converted into a stream of discrete numbers, representing the changes in chroma and luminance values (video) orair-pressure (audio) through time, thus making an abstract template for the original sound or moving image. In 1967, the first digital audio magnetic tape recorder is invented. A 12-bit 30 kHz stereo device using a compander to extend the dynamic range.

== Information Brochures, History of Sound Recording ==
- Tolnai "LP 16" Long Playing recorder. Long playing tape recorder, the music collector's dream now realized, a world first in design, apparatus of absolute world class. Very stable, robust features, simple design. 16-28-40 hours of continuous play without changing tapes. Accurate position indicator finds exactly the desired position on the tape. High quality sound with Hi-Fi. Accelerating, incredibly fast rewind. Easy to maneuver. (1954–1959)
- Tolnai "LP 20" Long Playing recorder, Super-Stereo Multitrack recorder. The recorder had 20-30-40 tracks. Each track plays an hour at the highest possible speed, automatic track change and a continuous play time of 20–40 hours, stereo and independent two-track recording (as in two separate recorders). (1954–1959)
- Stålex tape recorder, "Stålex bandspelare". A world first. Stålex portable tape recorder intended to satisfy high demands for a long time. It was equipped sith two speeds with a running time of 16 resp. 32 hours of actual play time. Stålex tape was reliable with high precision and comfortable and easy to maneuver. The higher ratte was designed for high-quality music, while the lower speed was perfectly adequate for speech, theater, conferences and simpler music. (1964–1967)
- Studymaster tape recorder, "Studymaster Centralapparat". For language teaching in schools. The panel worked with a "storage tape", 2" with 28 tracks, the normal duration 40 minutes (maximum 60 minutes) and a tape loop ("forever loope") with 28 tracks. Turnaround 40 seconds, or shorter if necessary. For the 28 tracks of the loop there are 12 pieces recorded with homework, the other 16 pieces are empty and they are intended for the students exercises. (1960–1972)
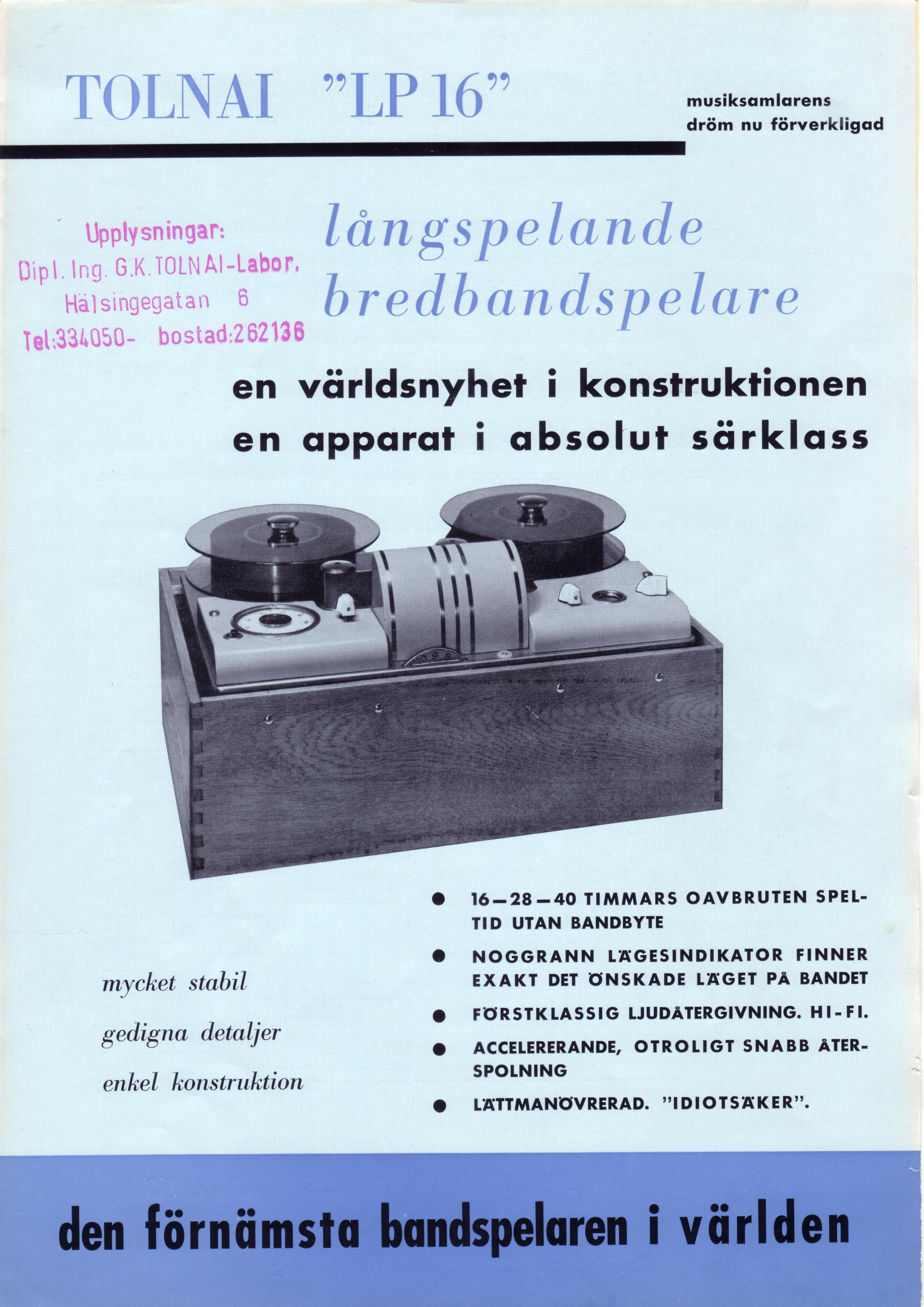
Tolnai "LP 16" Long Playing recorder. Long playing tape recorder, a world first in design, apparatus of absolute world class. (1954-1959)

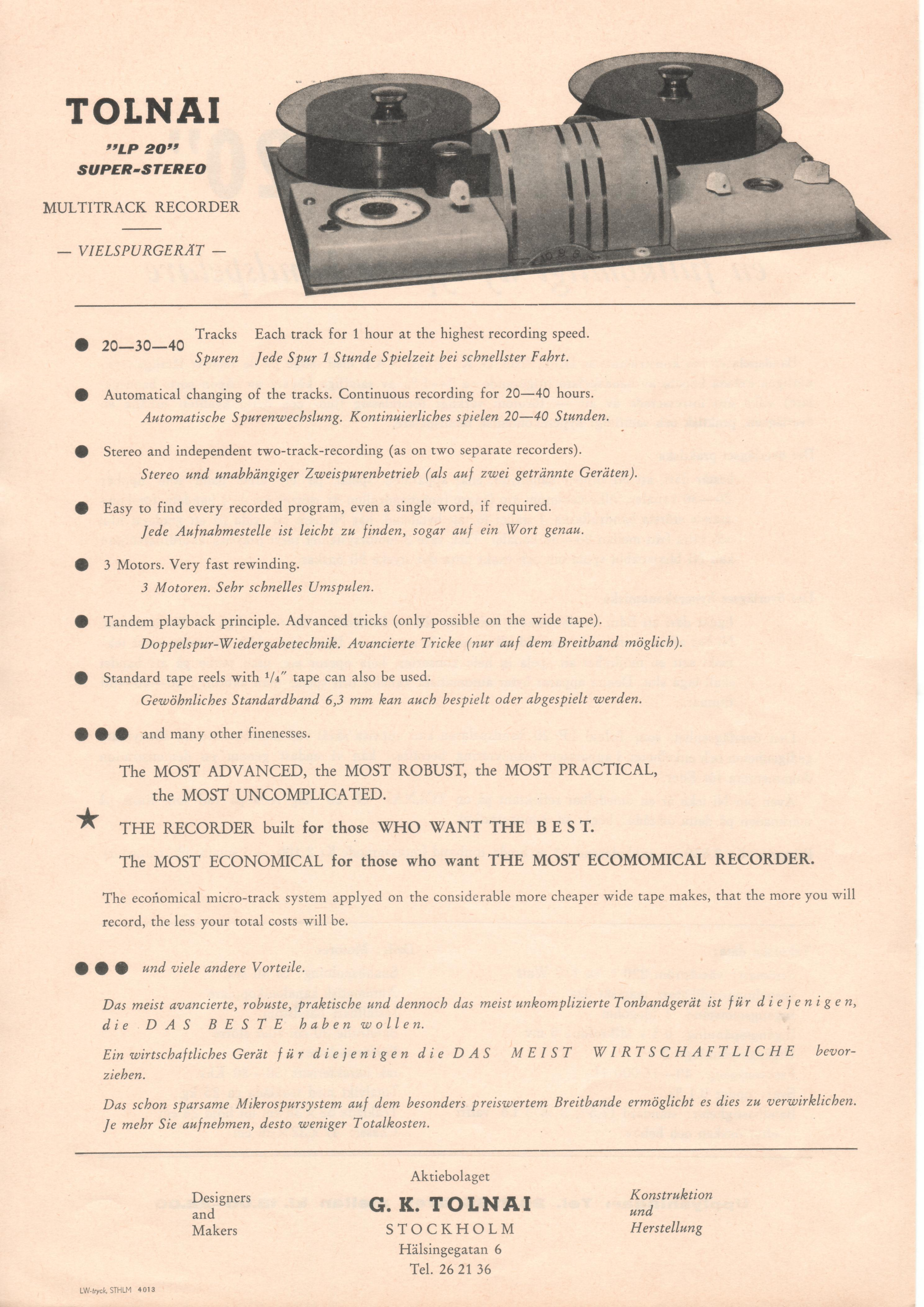
Tolnai "LP 20" Long Playing recorder, Super-Stereo Multitrack recorder. The recorder had 20-30-40 tracks. (1954-1959)

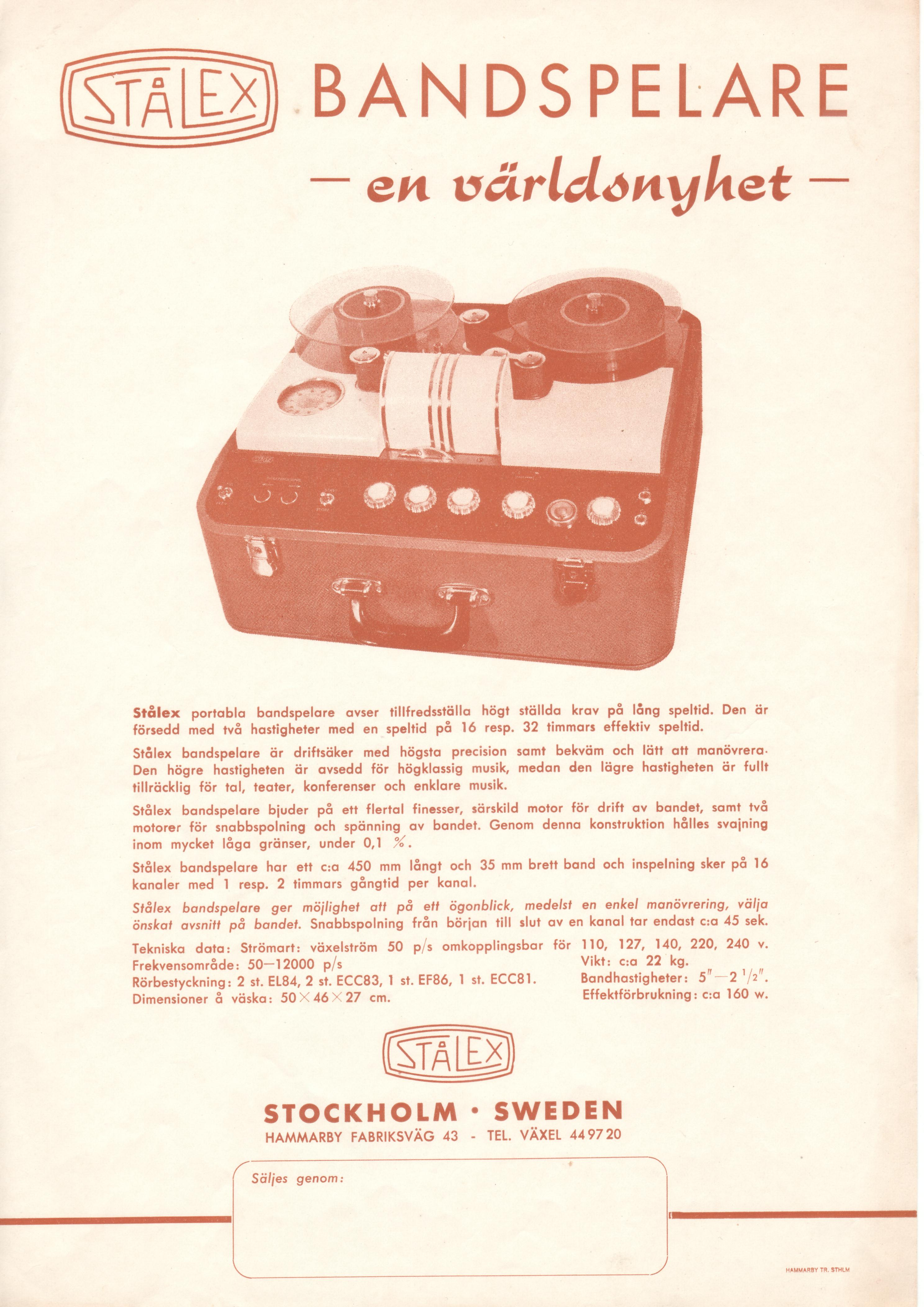
Stålex tape recorder, "Stålex bandspelare". A world first. Stålex portable tape recorder intended to satisfy high demands for a long time. (1964-1967)

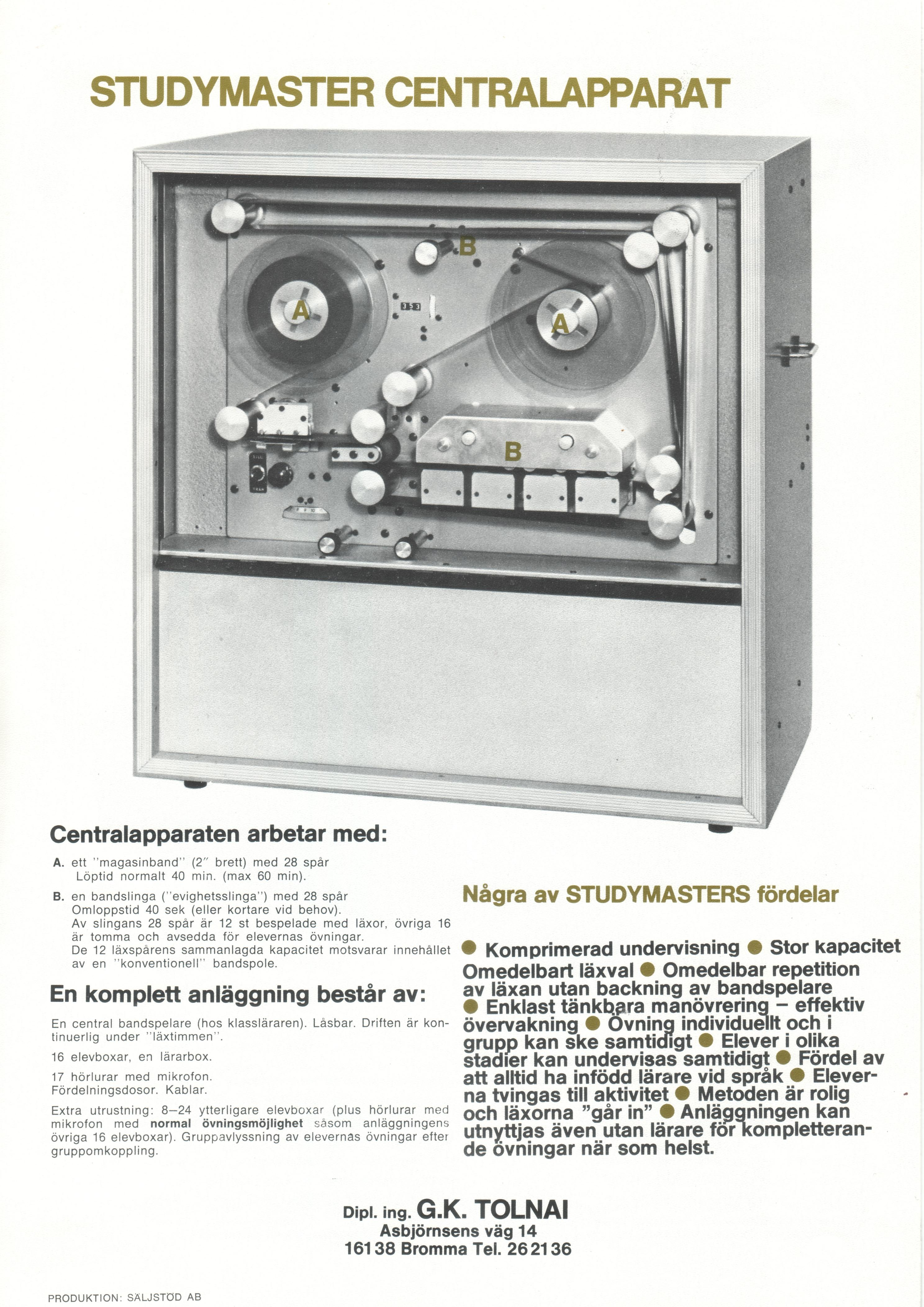
Studymaster tape recorder, "Studymaster Centralapparat". For language teaching in schools. (1960-1972)

== The early sound recording and reproduction ==
The history of sound recording can cover mechanical, acoustical, electrical, magnetic and digital recording. Methods and media for sound recording are varied and have undergone significant changes between the first time sound was actually recorded for later playback until now. Engineers at AEG, working with the chemical giant IG Farben a German chemical industry in Frankfurt am Main, created the world's first practical magnetic tape recorder, the K1, which was first demonstrated in 1935. The three major firms BASF, Bayer and Hoechst produced several hundred different dyes, along with the five smaller firms Agfa, Cassella and some other companies.

In 1857 the first device that could record sound waves as they passed through the air was invented. It was the phonautograph. The phonograph expanded on the principles of the phonautograph. Perfected by Thomas Edison in 1878, the phonograph was a device with a cylinder covered with an impressionable material such as tin foil, lead, or wax on which a stylus etched grooves. The advent of electrical recording made it possible to use microphones to capture the sound of the performance. The leading record labels switched to the electric microphone process in 1925, and most other record companies followed their lead by the end of the decade.

Magnetic recording was demonstrated in principle as early as 1898 by Valdemar Poulsen in his telegraphone. Magnetic wire recording, and its successor, magnetic tape recording, involve the use of a magnetizable medium which moves with a constant speed past a recording head. Engineers at AEG, working with the chemical giant IG Farben, created the world's first practical magnetic tape sound recorder, the 'K1', which was first demonstrated in 1935. By 1943 AEG had developed stereo tape recorders. Development of magnetic tape recorders in the late 1940s and early 1950s is associated with the Brush Development Company and its licensee, Ampex; the equally important development of magnetic tape media itself was led by Minnesota Mining and Manufacturing corporation (now known as 3M).

The next major development in magnetic tape was multitrack recording, in which the tape is divided into multiple tracks parallel with each other. Analog magnetic tape recording introduces noise, usually called "hiss", caused by the finite size of the magnetic particles in the tape. There is a direct tradeoff between noise and economics. Signal-to-noise ratio is increased at higher speeds and with wider tracks, and decreased at lower speeds and with narrower tracks. By the late 1960s, disk reproducing equipment became so good that audiophiles soon became aware that some of the noise audible on recordings was not surface noise or deficiencies in their equipment, but reproduced tape hiss. Before 1963, when Philips introduced the Compact audio cassette, almost all tape recording had used the reel-to-reel (also called "open reel") format. Previous attempts package the tape in a convenient cassette that required no threading met with limited success. The most successful tape was 8-track cartridge used primarily in automobiles for playback only.

== The reel-to-reel format ==
In analogue audio recording a tachometer is a device that measures the speed of audiotape as it passes across the head. The reel-to-reel format was used in the very earliest magnetic tape sound recorders, including the pioneering German Magnetophon machines of the 1930s. Originally, this format had no name, since all forms of magnetic tape recorders used it. The name arose only with the need to distinguish it from the several kinds of tape cartridges or cassettes such as the endless loop cartridge, Fidelipac, developed for radio station commercials and spot announcements in 1954, the full size cassette, developed by RCA in 1958 for home use, as well as the compact cassette developed by Philips in 1962, originally for dictation. Reel-to-reel tape was also used in early tape drives for data storage on mainframe computers, video tape recorder (VTR) machines, and high quality analog audio recorders, which have been in use from the early 1940s, up until the present.

== Multi-track recorders ==
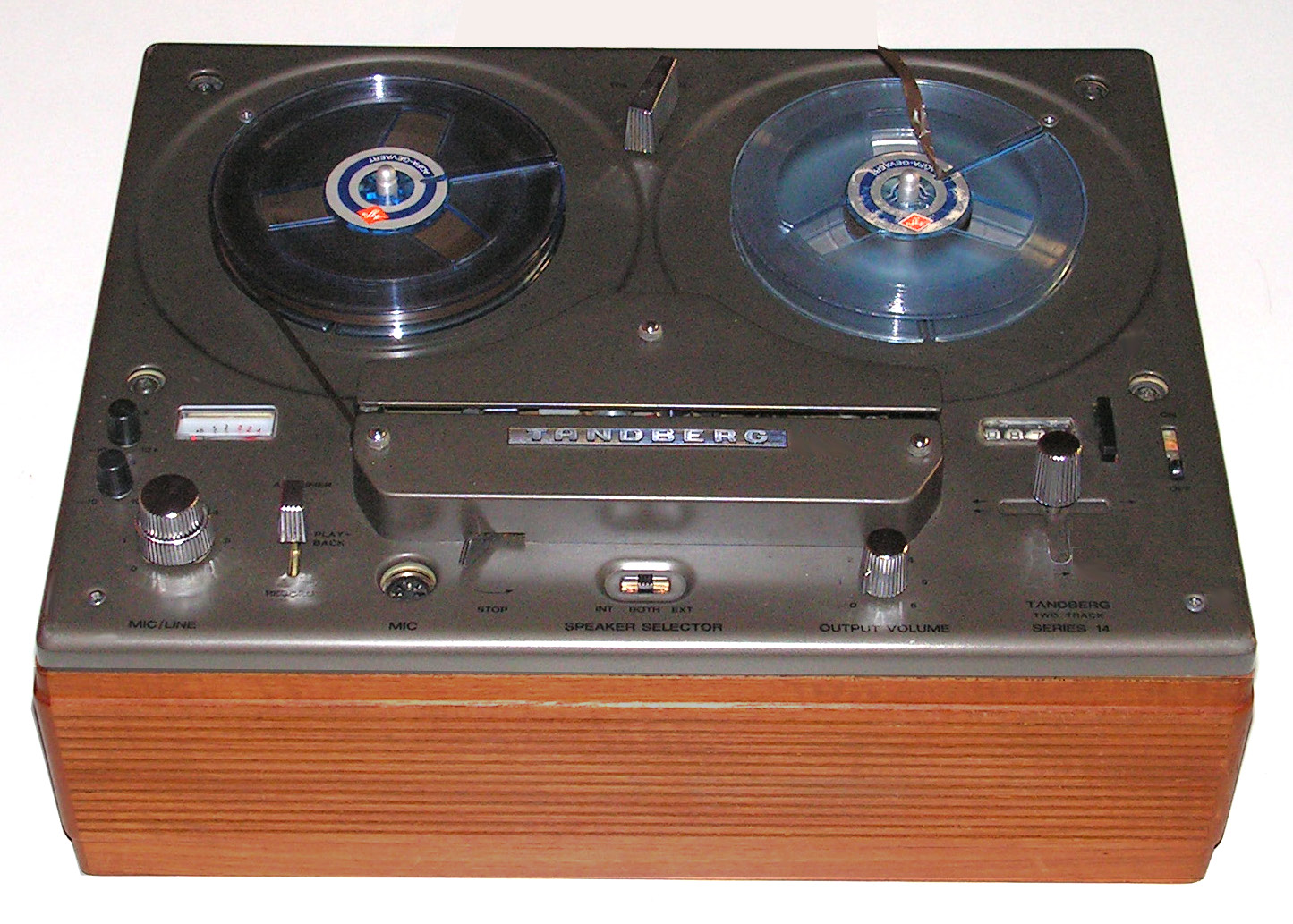
Tandberg. Reel-to-reel audio tape recorder, Tandberg Serie 14.

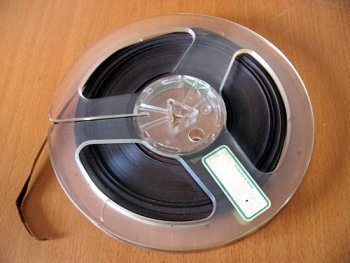
7" reel of ¼" recording tape, typical of audiophile, consumer and educational use in the 1950s–60s.

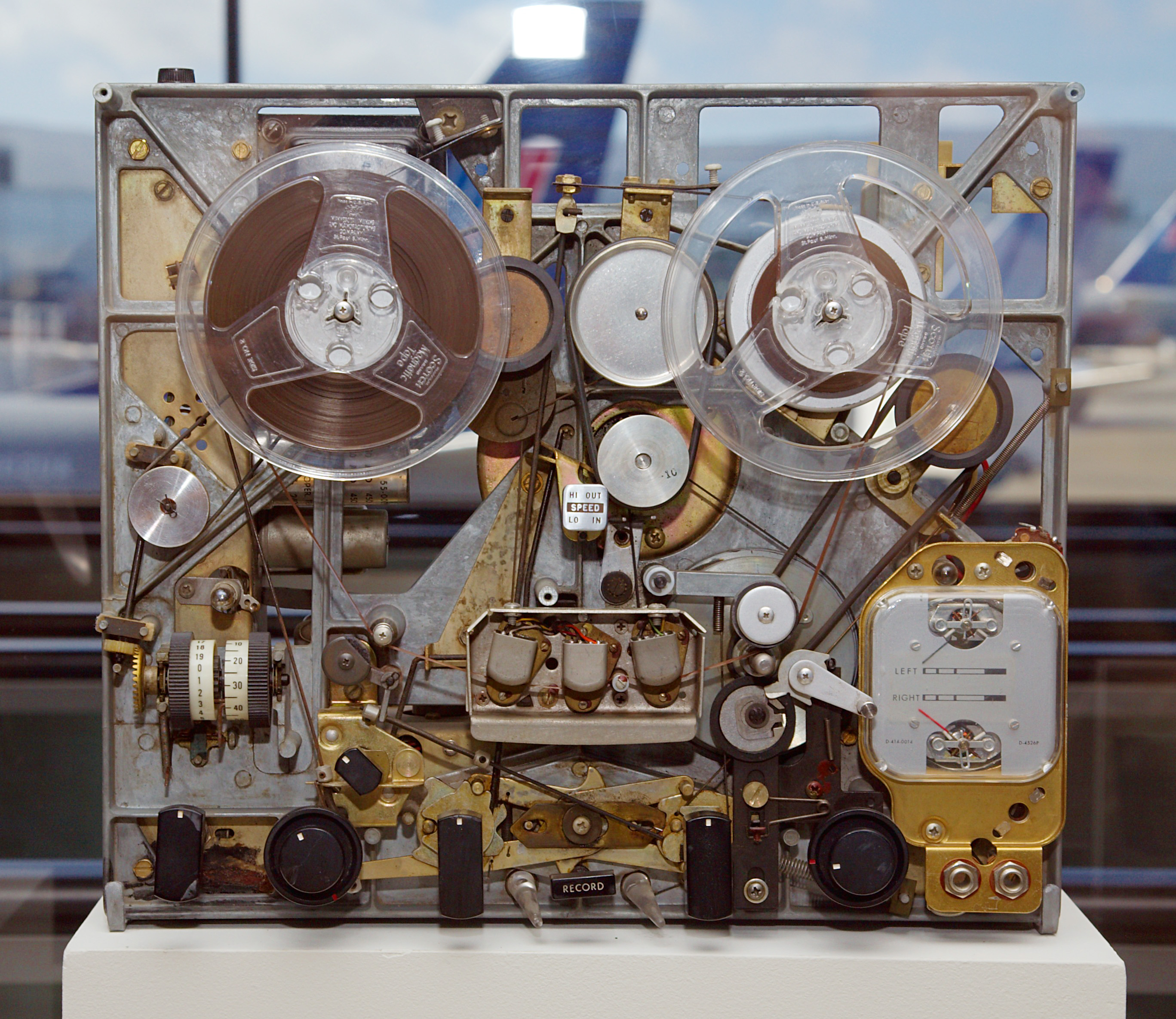
Internals of an Ampex tape recorder from 1965. Courtesy of Bill Wray.

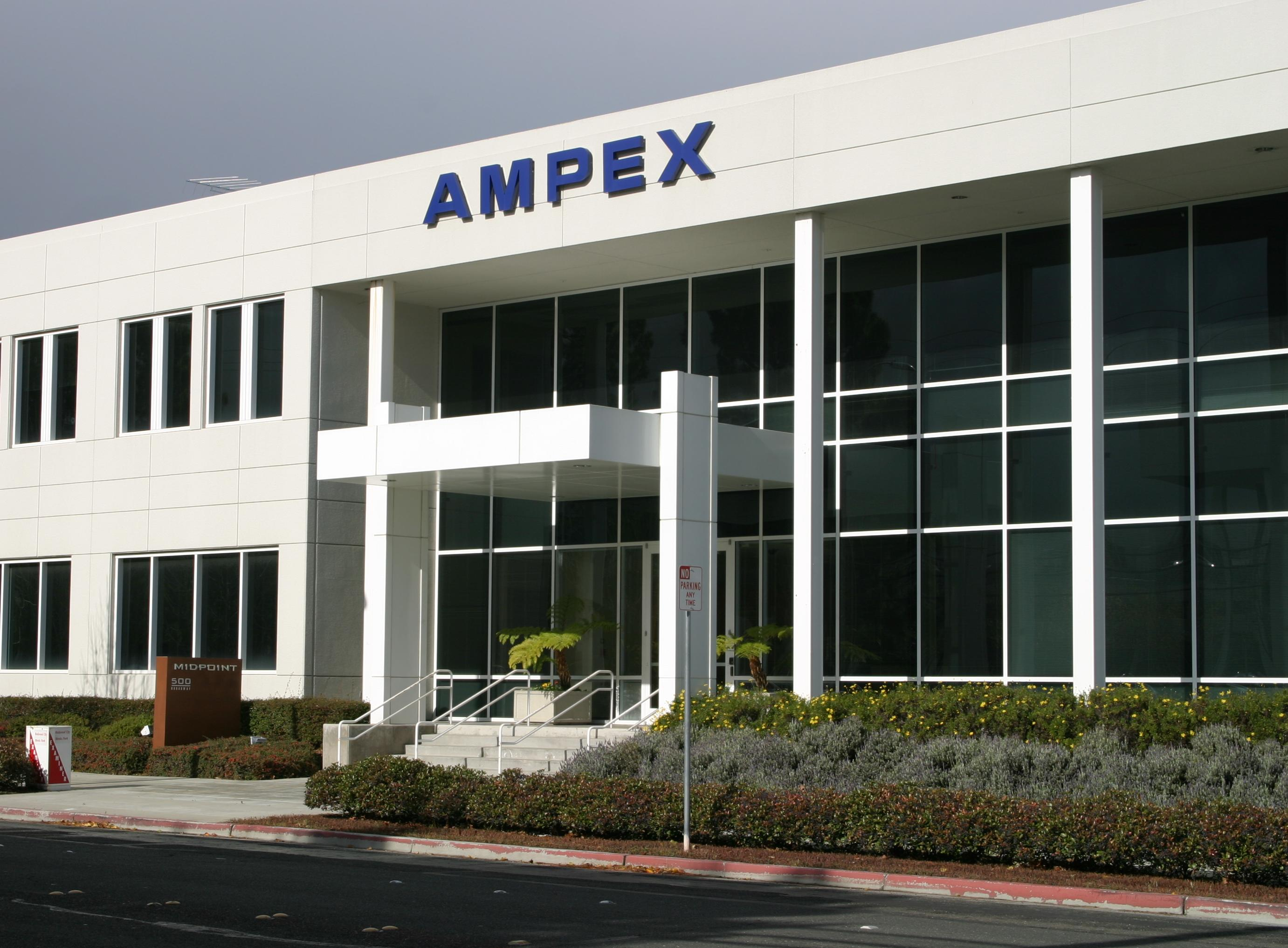
Ampex Corporation HQ, the American electronic company, is based in Redwood City, California, United States.

Home audio essentially, refers to any audio electronics intended for home use, such as home stereos and surround sound receivers, which are becoming the most popular piece of home audio equipment.

Kornél Tolnai sought to get the perfect stereophonic sound (Greek, stereos = "solid" and phōnē ="sound"), commonly called "stereo", on new constructions of tape recorders. Stereo or stereophonic sound is the reproduction of sound using two or more independent audio channels through a symmetrical configuration of loudspeakers in such a way as to create the impression of sound heard from various directions, as in natural hearing. It is often contrasted with monophonic, or "mono" sound, where audio is in the form of one channel, often centered in the sound field (analogous to a visual field).

== Magnetic tape and Reel-to-Reel Tape Recording ==
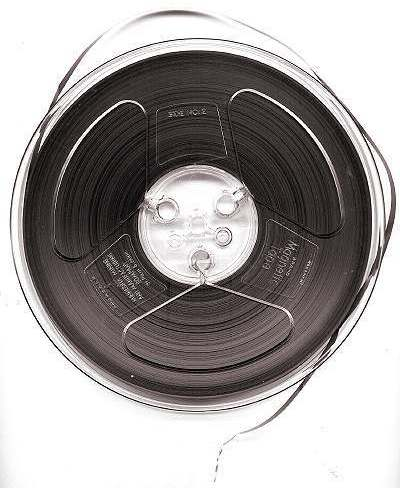
Reel of magnetic tape as used in the mid-1960s. The picture shows 7-inch reel of 1/4-inch-wide (6.4 mm) recording tape, typical of non-professional use in the 1950s–1970s. Studios generally used 10 1/2 inch reels on PET film backings.

A typical home "portable" reel-to-reel tape recorder, this one made by Sonora. It could play stereo quarter-track tapes, but record only in one quarter-track mono. Home equipment with missing features were fairly common in the 1950s and 1960s.

For the magnetic tape sound recording Kornél Tolnai used magnetic tape as a medium for magnetic recording, made of a thin magnetizable coating on a long, narrow strip of plastic. Most audio, video and computer data storage is this type. It was developed in Germany, based on magnetic wire recording. Devices that record and play back audio and video using magnetic tape are tape recorders and later on video tape recorders. A device that stores computer data on magnetic tape is a tape drive (tape unit, streamer).

Magnetic tape revolutionized broadcast and recording. Magnetic tape was invented for recording sound by Fritz Pfleumer in 1928 in Germany, based on the invention of magnetic wire recording by Valdemar Poulsen in 1898. Pfleumer's invention used an iron oxide (Fe^{2}O^{3}) powder coating on a long strip of paper. This invention was further developed by the German electronics company AEG, which manufactured the recording machines and BASF, which manufactured the tape. In 1933, working for AEG, Eduard Schüller developed the ring shaped tape head. Eduard Schüller, was a German engineer and he had a decisive role in the development of the rape recorder and the videorecorders. Previous head designs were needle shaped and tended to shred the tape.

An important discovery made in this period was the technique of AC biasing which improved the fidelity of the recorded audio signal by increasing the effective linearity of the recording medium. Ampex Corporation, the American electronics company's first tape recorder, the Ampex Model 200A, was first shipped in April 1948. During the early 1950s Ampex began marketing one- and two-track machines using ¼" tape. The line soon expanded into three- and four-track models using ½" tape. In the early 1950s Ampex moved to 934 Charter St. Redwood City, California. Ampex acquired Orradio Industries in 1959, which became the Ampex Magnetic Tape Division, headquartered in Opelika, Alabama. This made Ampex a manufacturer of both recorders and tape. By the end of that decade Ampex products were much in demand by top recording studio worldwide. Ampex built a handful of multitrack machines during the late 1950s that could record as many as eight tracks on 1 inch tape. In 1966 Ampex built their first 16-track recorder, the model AG-1000, at the request of Mirasound Studios in New York City. In 1967 Ampex introduced a 16-track version of the MM 1000 which was the world's first 16-track professional tape recorder put into mass-production. Kornél Tolnai often ordered his tapes from the American electronics company Ampex Corporation in the 1950s and 1960s.

Kornél Tolnai often visited a factory in Ludwigshafen am Rhein (Rhineland-Palatinate in Germany) for his business with the company. There he had contacts with BASF, the largest chemical company in the world. BASF SE is a German chemical company, founded in 1865, and SE stands for Societas Europea. The company is a pioneer in the chemical industry and has operations worldwide. 1925–1952 it was part of IG Farben. BASF originally stood for Badische Anilin- und Soda-Fabrik (Baden Aniline and Soda Factory). Today, the four letters are a registered trademark and the company is listed on the Frankfurt Stock Exchange, London Stock Exchange, and Zurich Stock Exchange. The BASF Group's headquarters are located in Ludwigshafen

== Hi-Fi ==
For his tape recorders the specified recording times were at the highest Hi-Fi tape speed. High-fidelity – or hi-fi – reproduction is a term used by home stereo listeners and home audio enthusiasts (audiophiles) to refer to high-quality reproduction of sound or images that are very faithful to the original performance.

In the 1950s, the terms "high fidelity" or "hi-fi" were popularized for equipment and recordings which exhibited more accurate sound reproduction. Tolnai's tape had three engines and 35 or 50 mm wide strip. Belt speed was usually 5”, but there were also other speeds. Optional accessories could be the cluster head for reproducing multiple channels simultaneously, or for the registration of multiple processes simultaneously.

== Voice recording in the home and schools ==
Inexpensive reel-to-reel tape recorders were widely used for voice recording in the home and in schools before the Philips compact cassette, introduced in 1963, gradually took over. Cassettes eventually displaced reel-to-reel recorders for consumer use.

The reel-to-reel audio tape recorder and the cafe machine was a kind of jukebox (disc changer), and for music reproduction at home and at school as well as for teaching purposes, a so-called "Study Master" or tape recorder called Tolnai Study Master for language teaching in schools. Here he collaborated with AB Stålex during the years 1964–1967. The new language of the machine represented a major development of the technical tools for the teaching of language laboratories. "Study Master" was welcomed as a major step in the right direction by language scholars. The reel-to-reel audio tape recorder were sold in Sweden, Finland, Hungary and the United States. He constantly worked with improvements in sound recording and reproduction (audio technology).

== Patents ==
=== Patents in various countries ===
Some inventions which Gábor Kornél Tolnai received patents for in various countries were:

- Centralograph, for production monitoring and registration of the running of the spinning machines in workshops and offices,

a) manufactured in his own workshop, called "Dipl.ing. GK Tolnai Okl. Gépészmérnök" (M. Sc. G K Tolnai Master of Science Mechanical), in Mester útca 13, Budapest IX (1928–1931),
b) manufactured of L.M. Ericsson in Stockholm (with employment for G. K. Tolnai),
Anordning för kontinuerlig uppteckning av rotationshastighet eller arbetsprestation hos maskiner, Patent SE83509, Telefonaktiebolaget L. M. Ericsson, Stockholm, Inventor: G. K. Tolnai och P. Hermann. Sweden, Kungl. Patent- och registreringsverket. Patent SE83509. Patent time from July 9, 1931. Published May 28, 1935. 4 pages (incl. drawing).
Registreringsapparat, Registreringsapparat, Telefonaktiebolaget L. M. Ericsson, Stockholm, Inventor: G. K. Tolnai. Sweden, Kungliga Patent- och registreringsverket. Patent nr SE82180. Patented from July 10, 1931. Published December 11, 1934. 3 pages (incl. drawing).
c) constructed with patent royalties for G. K. Tolnai and ordered by Director and Insurance Manager Torsten Hammarstrand, Göta Veritas Insurance, Kungsgatan, Stockholm (1934–1949). The name "Bureau Veritas" was included in both the French dictionary Larousse and Webster's Revised Unabridged Dictionary.

- Teletachograph, a tachograph, a device for registration and improvement of the running of spinning machines, "for remote control of machinery", which combines the functions of a clock and a speedometer (1931–1933).

Registreringsapparat. Inventor: G.K. Tolnai. Swedish Patent, Kungl. Patent- och registreringsverket. Telefonaktiebolaget L.M. Ericsson, Stockholm. Patent SE82180. Allowed from July 10, 1931. Published December 11, 1934.

- Regulator, a device to measure and regulate the speed to keep constant speed of the spinning machines regardless of load pressure (1931–1933).
- Anordning för återgivande på avstånd av fria kroppars rörelse, Patent SE90397, G. K. Tolnai, Stockholm. Sweden. Kungl. Patent- och registreringsverket. Patent SE90397. Prioritet craving from April 16, 1935 (Germany). Allowed July 29, 1937. Patent time from June 29, 1935. Published September 28, 1937. Class 74: c: 12-01. 8 pages (incl. 3 pages drawings).
- Rapportoskop, Central Instrument for anti-aircraft cannons (1937), was patented by Arenco in 12 countries (1937–1939), (Royal Army Ordnance Depot Department Administration, 1938). Rapportoskop was commissioned in 1938, this design was the beginning of the Central Instrument of Arenco.
- Transmission, drive device (Gerhard Arehn Engineering Workshop) (1942)

Variabel utväxlingsanordning, Patent SE108544, Aktiebolaget Gerh. Arehns Mekaniska Verkstad, Stockholm. Uppfinnare: G. K. Tolnai, Stockholm. Sweden. Kungl. Patent- och registreringsverket. Patent SE108544. Allowed July 22, 1943. Patent time from September 10, 1941. Published November 23, 1943. Class 47: h: 14. 3 pages (incl. drawing).

- Transmission device, http://www.google.com/US2400668. Patent US2400668. United States Patent and Trademark Office, In Sweden September 1, 1941, Application date March 22, 1944, Patented May 21, 1946. Gábor Kornél Tolnai, Stockholm, Sweden, assignor to Arenco Aktiebolag, Stockholm, Sweden, a joint-stock company.
- Drive Relay, variable ratio device, part of the central apparatus, separate Patents (Arenco) (1943)

Variabel utväxlingsanordning, Patent SE103900, Aktiebolaget Gerh. Arehns Mekaniska Verkstad, Stockholm. Inventor: G. K. Tolnai, Stockholm. Sweden. Kungl. Patent- och registreringsverket. Patent SE103900. Allowed December 30, 1941. Patent time from February 21, 1940. Published March 3, 1942. Class 47: h: 14. 3 pages (incl. drawing).

- Anordning för åstadkommande av samma vinkellägen eller synkron rotationsrörelse hos tvenne mekaniskt åtskilda kroppar Patent 114272, Arenco Aktiebolag, Stockholm. Inventor: G. K: Tolnai, Stockholm. Sweden. Kungl. Patent- och registreringsverket. Patent SE114272. Allowed April 19, 1945. Patent time from March 1, 1939. Published June 19, 1945. Class 21: c: 46-03. 9 pages (incl. 4 pages drawings).
- Anordning vid apparater för bestämmande av träffpunkten (framförpunkten) vid beskjutning av rörliga mål Patent SE118093, Arenco Aktiebolag, Stockholm. Inventor: G. K: Tolnai, Stockholm. Sweden. Kungl. Patent- och registreringsverket. Patent SE118093. Allowed December 5, 1946. Patent time from July 8, 1940. Published February 4, 1947. Class 72: f: 15-05. 8 pages (incl. 4 pages drawings).
- Anordning för synkron överföring av lägesändringar Patent SE118527, Arenco Aktiebolag, Stockholm. Uppfinnare: G. K. Tolnai, Stockholm. Sverige. Kungl. Patent- och registreringsverket. Patent SE118527. Allowed February 6, 1947. Patent time from January 29, 1941. Published April 8, 1947. Class 21: c: 46-01. 3 pages (incl. 1 page drawing). The same invention was patented in the United States, May 21, 1946, under the name Transmission device, http://www.google.com/US2400668 Transmission device US2400668.
- Anordning för mätning av föremåls avstånd Patent SE120847, Arenco Aktiebolag, Stockholm. Uppfinnare: G. K. Tolnai, Stockholm. Sweden. Kungl. Patent- och registreringsverket. Patent SE120847. Allowed December 11, 1947. Patent time from July 8, 1940. Published February 10, 1948. Class 42: c: 20. 3 pages (incl. 1 page drawing).
- Eldledningsinstrumentering för eldledning mot rörliga mål Patent SE123543, Arenco Aktiebolag, Stockholm. Uppfinnare: G. K. Tolnai, Stockholm. Sweden. Kungl. Patent- och registreringsverket. Patent SE123543. Allowed October 7, 1948. Patent time from September 13, 1941. Published December 7, 1948. Class 72: f: 15-02. 3 pages (incl. 1 page drawing).
- Anordning för mätning av avståndet till ett föremål Patent SE129878, Arenco Aktiebolag, Stockholm. Inventor: G. K. Tolnai, Stockholm. Sweden. Kungl. Patent- och registreringsverket. Patent SE129878. Allowed August 17, 1950. Patent time from March 24, 1942. Published October 24, 1950. Class 42: c: 14. 4 pages (incl. 1 page drawing).
- Impulsator, a temperering machine built-in into a grenade tip. Temperering of the fire tube at a cannon at ongoing and varying directions on aircraft (for Bofors) (1947)
- Central Instrument (Model Tolnai), the central instrument for anti-aircraft cannons (Royal Army Ordnance Department Administration, 1949 edition)
- Tape recorders, so-called Café Machine (1954–1959)
- Tape recorders, with 16, 24 or 28 channels for music and education (1954–1959)
- Study Master, for language teaching (1960–1972)
- Language Teaching Recording-Reproducing Apparatus and Method, http://www.google.se/patents/US3343280. Patent US3343280. United States Patent and Trademark Office, Gábor Kornél Tolnai, 14, Asbjornsens vag, Bromma, Sweden. Filed December 10, 1964, Ser.No. 417,408. Claims Priority, application Sweden December 10, 1963, 13,677/63. Patented November 26, 1967.
- Differential Gear, 4 patents (1960–1972)
- Reportoscope, Sport Reportoscope, to comply with the athlete, such as runners on the track (1975)

=== Patents in the United States ===
Some of the inventions Gábor Kornél Tolnai received patent in the U.S. were:

- "Transmission device". Transmission, Överföringsanordning. United States Patent No.2400668. Publication Date: 05/21/1946. Inventor: Gábor Kornél Tolnai. Assignee: Arenco AB.
- "Language Teaching Recording-Reproducing Apparatus and Method". Language Teaching Recording Reproducing Apparatus and Method, Språkundervisning inspelning-återgivning och metod. United States Patent No.3343280. Publication Date: 09/26/1967. Inventor and assignee: Gábor Kornél Tolnai.
- "Constant Tension Tape Transport System". Constant Tension Tape Transport System, Konstant spänning band transportsystem. United States Patent No.3327958. Publication Date: 06/27/1967. Inventor and assignee: Gábor Kornél Tolnai.
- Patentmaps, Assignee Gábor Kornél Tolnai, 6 results.

== Patent Licensing & enforcement US and European patent litigations ==
- Gábor Kornél Tolnai, Assignee Patent Directory, Page 1. Example: ,, etc.

1. 1963–1967. An arrangement in sound reproducing appliances having tapelike sound recording carriers, particularly for teaching purposes.

Gabor Kornel Tolnai Jun, 7 1967: GB1070864.
1,070,864. Recording and playback. G. K. TOLNAI. Aug. 4, 1964 [Dec. 10, 1963], No. 30720/64. Heading G5R. Recording and play-back apparatus for teaching purposes including an endless tape 12 associated with a number of heads 16 arranged in a line transverse to the tape is characterized in that a...

2. 1939–1941. Improvements in driving mechanism for rotary members.

Gabor Kornel Tolnai Sep, 3 1941: GB539278.
539,278. Variable-speed friction gearing. TOLNAI, G. K., and AKTIEBOLAGET G. AREHNS MEKANISKA VERKSTAD. March 1, 1940, No. 3901. Convention date, March 1, 1939. [Class 80 (ii)] In means for controlling the speed of a rotating member by means of step-by-step rotary movements, the rotation of a...

3. 1939–1941. Improvements in devices for electric remote control.

Gabor Kornel Tolnai Sep, 2 1941: GB539242.
539,242. Electric synchronous movements. TOLNAI, G. K., and AKTIEBOLAGET G. AREHNS MEKANISKA VERKSTAD. March 1, 1940, No. 3900. Convention date, March 1, 1939. [Class 40 (iii)] [Also in Group XXXVIII] In an arrangement for conveying angular or rotary movement from one shaft to another, each shaft...

4. 1935–1936. Improvements in or relating to apparatus for reproducing or repeating the movement of a moving object.

Gabor Kornel Tolnai Dec, 1 1936: GB457601.
457,601. Electric signalling systems. TOLNAI, G. K., 14, De Geersgatan, Stockholm. June 29, 1936, Nos. 18036 and 26289. Convention dates, June 29, 1935 and June 15, 1936. [Class 40 (i)] [See also Groups XIX and XX] In a system for optically reproducing sporting events such as races, pointing...

5. 1931–1932. Improvements in apparatus for recording the performance of machines.

Gabor Kornel Tolnai Dec, 15 1932: GB384697.
384,697. Recording- apparatus. TOLNAI, G. K., 13, Mester U, Budapest. July 31, 1931, No. 21870. [Class 106 (iv).] Recording particular operations.-An apparatus for recording the performances of a number of working machines on a common record-strip driven uniformly comprises a printing hammer 1,...

6. 1931–1932. Improvements in and relating to apparatus for recording the speed of working of machine or other revolving shafts.

Gabor Kornel Tolnai Oct, 31 1932: GB382664.
382,664. Recording-apparatus. TOLNAI, G. K., 13, Mester Utca, and HERMANN, Paul, 45, Buda rsi Ut., both in Budapest. July 31, 1931, No. 21869. [Class 106 (iv).] An apparatus for recording the speed or working of a machine comprises a recording member periodically restored to and started anew from a...

== Represented ==
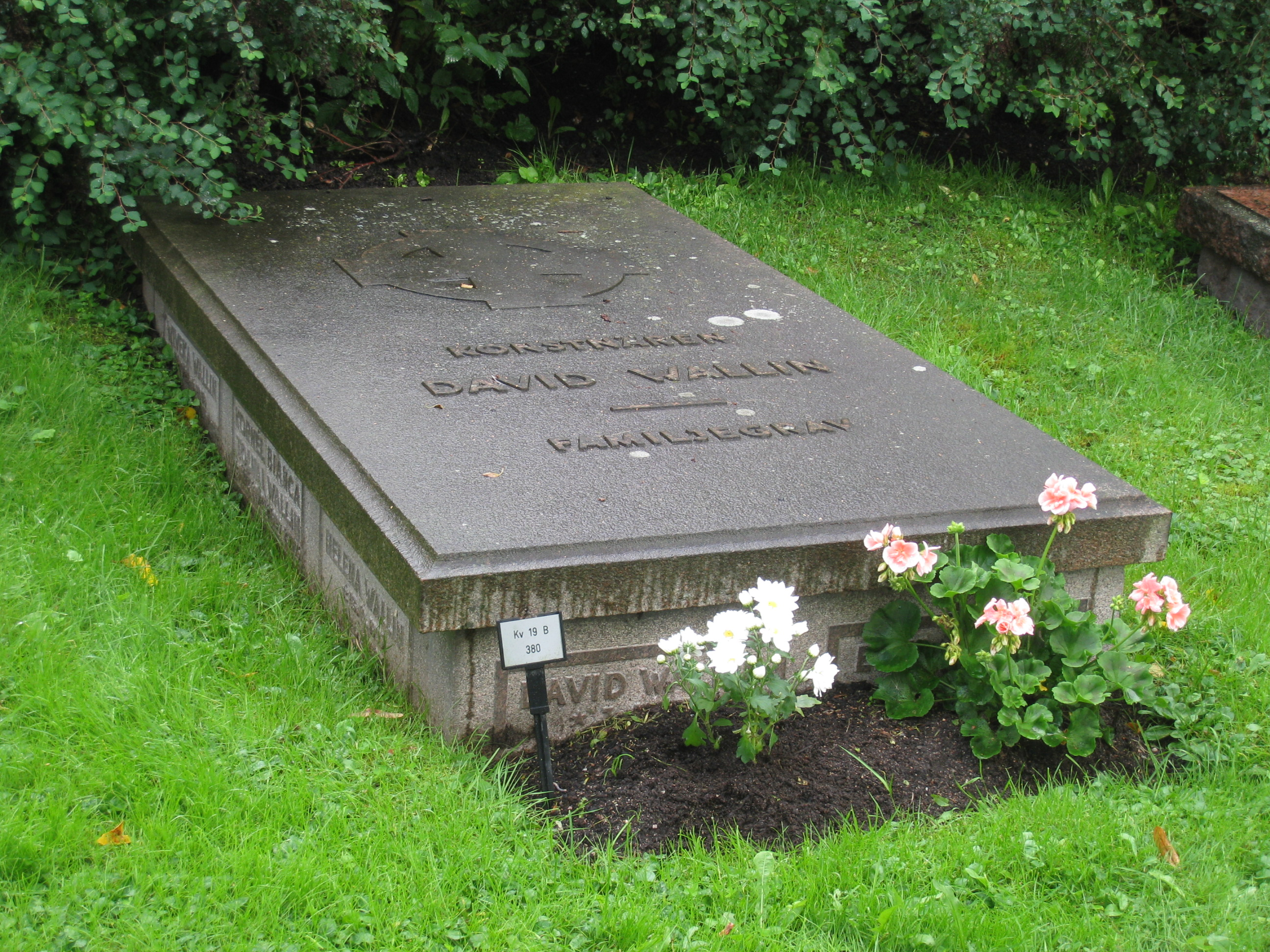
Gábor Kornél Tolnai is buried together with his wife, the artist Bianca Wallin in the Family Grave of David Wallin at Norra begravningsplatsen in Solna, outside Stockholm.

- Swedish National Museum of Science and Technology, the technical museum in Stockholm, Museivägen 7, Box 27842, 115 93 Stockholm, Sweden. Official webb place for Tekniska Museet. In Tekniska Museet there are some patents and two tape recorders of G. K. Tolnai's inventions, the two sets called "TOLNAI LP16" and "TOLNAI LP28" with the accession number TeM49847. TeM49847.
- http://www.kringla.nu/kringla/objekt?text=tolnai+andersson&filter=thumbnailExists%3Dj&referens=tekm/object/TeM49847 Swedish National Museum of Science and Technology in Stockholm, two tape recorders, one with 20 tracks (D 231) and one with 16 tracks. Weight: 25,0 + 20,0 kg. Tape recorders, constructed and designed by Gábor Kornél Tolnai, made in Stockholm, Sweden, mediated by Hillevi Tolnai-Andersson, donated 1986–1987 by Bianca Wallin, born in Rome, Italy, married to Gábor Kornél Tolnai. DIG10407, DIG10408, DIG10409.
- http://www.kringla.nu/kringla/objekt?referens=tekm/media/87885 Länkad av Tekniska museet, AB G.K. Tolnai, Bandspelare, svart-vit fotografi, foto EF1375.04
- The Swedish National Museum of Science and Technology in Stockholm is Sweden's largest technical museum with collection of technology history and has a national mandate to be responsible for the technical and industrial heritage.
- Centrum för Näringslivshistoria, CfN, Center for Business History in Stockholm, Grindstuvägen 48-50, 167 33 Bromma, Sweden. Official webb place for Centrum för Näringslivshistoria is .

Diploma Engineer Gábor Kornél Tolnai's archives and records with original documents from the years between 1924–1982 are filed at the Center for Business History. “Kornél Tolnai and the papers he left” are here and also one of his inventions, the tape recorder, LP16-28. Center for Business History preserves and presents the Swedish company's history and here you can do archival research work.

- Scandinavian journal of textile industry, Skandinavisk tidskrift för textilindustri in No. 7-8, 1931.
- ¨Magyar Textiltechnologusok Lapja, Hungarian Technological Journal, 25 May 1934, TEXTILES IPAR, Textiles industry, Budapest. It was a Hungarian textile trade magazine. The title of the lecture was rationalization of the textile industry, Kornél Tolnai's lecture in 1934 about his inventions Teletachograf and Centralograf at the Technical University of Budapest (Hungarian: Hungarian Royal József Technical University, Budapest).
- Sveriges Radiohistoriska Förening, Svenska Bandspelarjukeboxar (Swedish Radio Historical Association, the Swedish Tape jukeboxes)
- Dr Obsolete stiger på – Euphonia Audioforum.
- Better sound for a better life.
- Reel-to-reel recorder brands, AEG, Ampex, Grundig, Magnetophon, Philips, RCA, Tandberg and Telefunken.
