= Wallin =

Wallin, alternatively Wahlin, is a surname of Swedish origin and may refer to:

- Alfred Wallin (1836–1923), American judge
- Bianca Wallin (1909–2006), Swedish artist
- Christer Wallin, former freestyle swimmer from Sweden
- Carl E. Wallin (1879–1968), Swedish-American artist
- Carl Georg August Wallin (1893–1978), Swedish artist (mariner painter)
- Cissi Wallin
- David Wallin (1876–1957), Swedish artist
- Elisabeth Ohlson Wallin, Swedish photographer and an artist
- Georg August Wallin (1811–1852), Finnish orientalist
- Harald Wallin (1887–1946), Swedish sailor who competed in the 1908 Summer Olympics
- Homer N. Wallin (1893–1984), Vice Admiral in the United States Navy
- J. E. Wallace Wallin (1876–1969), American psychologist and author
- Jesse Wallin, retired Canadian professional ice hockey defenceman
- Johan Olof Wallin (1779–1839), Swedish minister, orator, poet and Archbishop of Uppsala Sweden.
- Lars Wallin, Swedish fashion designer
- Lotta Wahlin, Swedish professional golfer
- Magdalena Forsberg (born as Magdalena Wallin), Swedish cross-country skier and biathlete
- Magnus Wallin, Swedish video artist
- Niclas Wallin, Swedish professional ice hockey player
- Nils Wallin (1904–1987), Swedish canoer who competed in the 1936 Summer Olympics
- Otto Wallin, Swedish professional boxer
- Oscar Wallin
- Pamela Wallin, former Canadian television journalist and diplomat
- Per Henrik Wallin (1946- 2005) Swedish jazz pianist and composer.
- Peter Wallin, professional ice hockey player who played in the National Hockey
- Rickard Wallin, Swedish professional ice hockey centre
- Rolf Wallin, Norwegian composer, trumpeter and avant-garde performance artist
- Samuel Wallin (1856–1917), U.S. Representative from New York
- Stefan Wallin, Finnish minister in Matti Vanhanen's Cabinet
- Ulf Wallin, Swedish classical violinist
- Winston Wallin
- Wallin Family, American family of traditional ballad singers

== Places ==
- Wallin, Michigan, an unincorporated community

== See also ==
- Wollin
- Wolin
