= David Wallin =

Swedish artist (1876–1957)

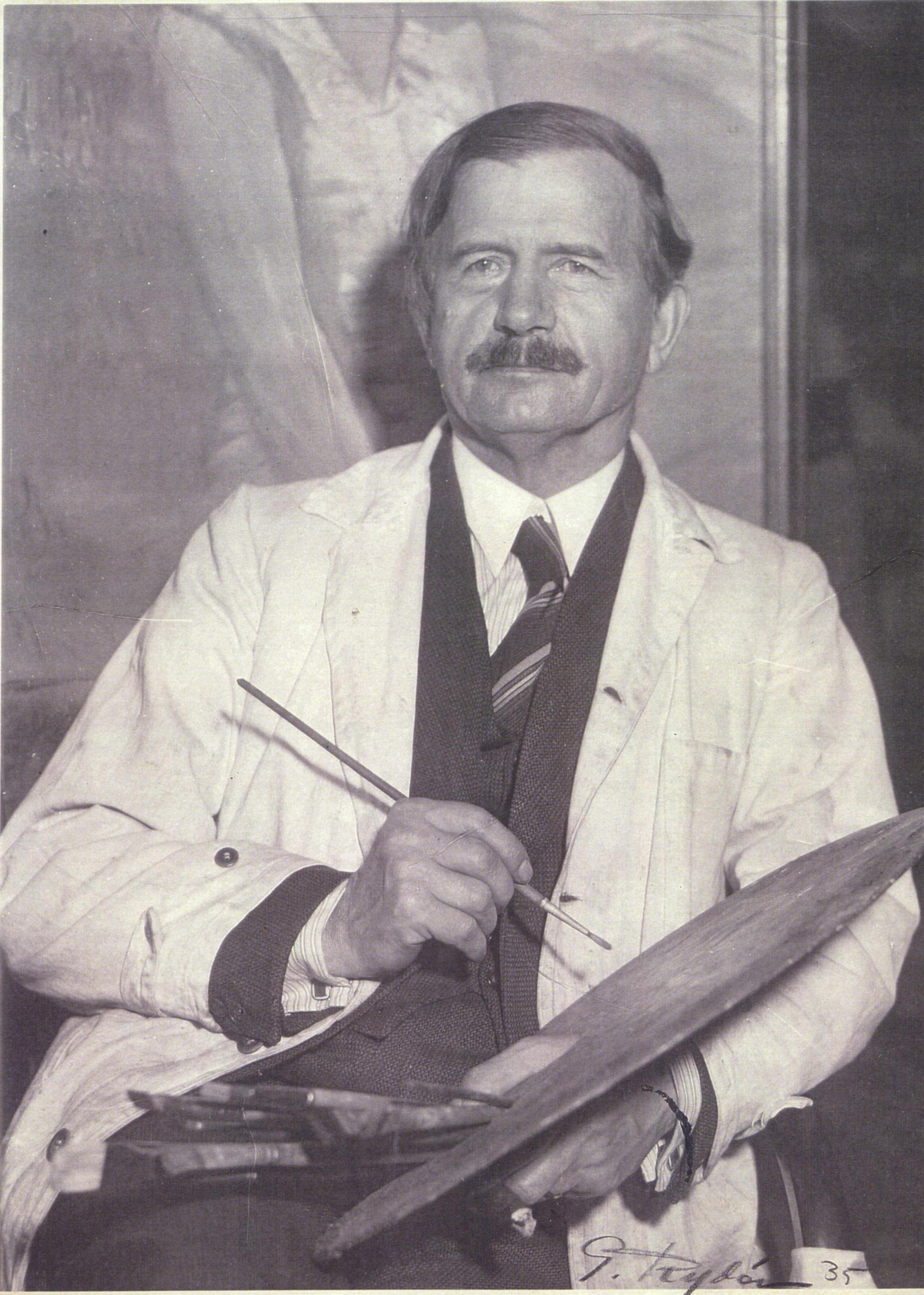
- The artist David Wallin in his art studio in Stockholm in 1935.
- Born: David August Wallin; 7 January 1876; Östra Husby, Vikbolandet, Sweden
- Died: 27 June 1957 (aged 81); Stockholm, Sweden
- Education: Royal Swedish Academy of Arts, Stockholm
- Known for: Painting; Drawing

Medal record

Art competitions

Representing Sweden

Olympic Games
Gold medal – first place	1932 Los Angeles	Paintings

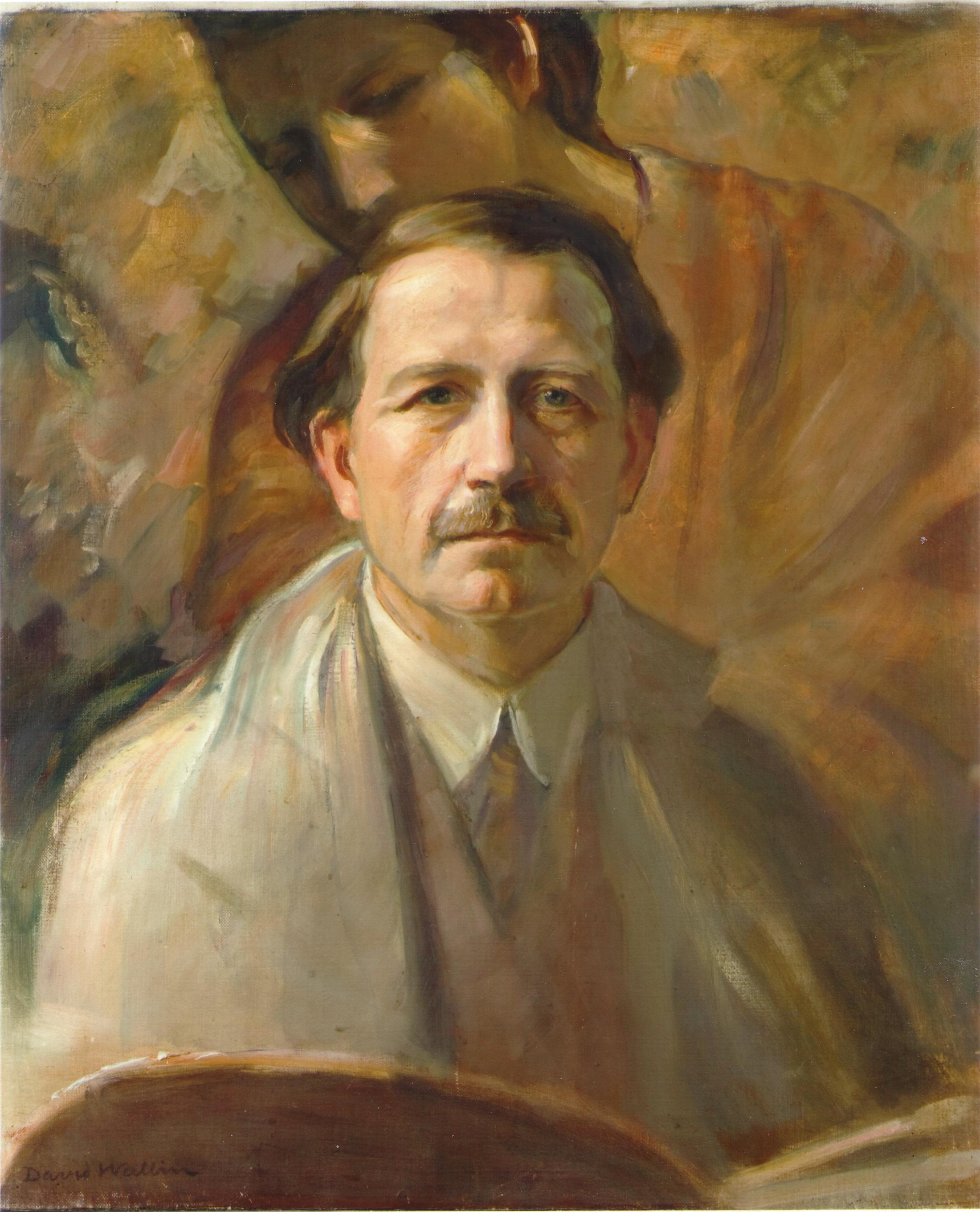
David Wallin (1876–1957) self-portrait, oil painting from 1938.

David August Wallin (7 January 1876 – 27 June 1957) was a Swedish artist. In 1932 he won an Olympic Gold Medal in the art competitions of the Olympic Games in Los Angeles for his oil painting "At the Seaside of Arild".

== Background ==
David Wallin is best known for his oil paintings with genre motifs and idealized images of nude women in atmospheric landscapes, where he stressed the affinity of human and nature. He also painted tender depictions of mother and child, and a series of portraits of famous Swedes and genres as figures, landscapes and nudes, still lifes and religious images. He is represented in a large number of museums.

In 1905 he married the artist Elin Wallin, born Lundberg (1884–1969). He was the brother of the Swedish-American artist Carl E. Wallin (1879–1968), and he was the father of the Swedish artist Bianca Wallin (1909–2006) and the artist Sigurd Wallin (1916–1999).

== Biography ==
=== Childhood and early years ===
David Wallin grew up on a farm, Varby, in Östra Husby parish, a locality on Vikbolandet, which had been in the family since the 17th century. His parents were the carpenter Alexander Wallin and his wife Inga Helena Larsdotter. He grew up in a large household with many siblings, a sister and four brothers. The home was strictly religious, and his father turned to the Bible and the writings of Carl Olof Rosenius for daily guidance. The popular revival movement was a powerful influence on life in the large household with the many children.

Wallin dreamt early of a career as an artist, his first artistic experience was an altarpiece by the artist Pehr Hörberg in Östra Husby church. He worked as a store clerk and as a painter's apprentice in Norrköping 1893–1896, simultaneously attending lectures at a technical evening college. In 1896 he arrived in Stockholm and found work in the studio/atelier of Carl Grabow, a Swedish decorative painter of theatrical décor. Carl Grabow had established a decorating studio in Kungsholmen in Stockholm. The Grabow Collection at the Drottningholm Theatre Museum is unique documentary material for those wishing to study Swedish scenography of the late 19th century and the first years of the 20th century. Then Wallin continued his studies at the Technical Evening College (Tekniska skolan) in Stockholm under Anders Forsberg, who was a Swedish artist and art teacher and the teacher of freehand drawing at the Technical School.

=== Royal Academy of Arts in Stockholm: 1898-1904 ===
In 1898 Wallin was admitted at the Royal Swedish Academy of Arts in Stockholm, where his fellow students included Karl Isakson, Ivar Arosenius and John Bauer. His teacher was among others Georg von Rosen. In 1903–1904 he studied briefly at the École des Beaux-Arts and Académie Colarossi in Paris, where his teacher was the Norwegian naturalist painter, illustrator, author and journalist Christian Krohg.

In 1902 Wallin received the Academy’s Ducal Prize for his oil painting "Kraka" and in 1904 he was awarded the Royal Medal for Portrait Painting. "Kraka" is a Norse mythology oil painting, of a little girl called Aslög or also called "Kraka" or "Kraka meets Ragnar Lodbrok" (Hrólf saga kraka, the Saga of King Hrolf kraki). David Wallin’s oil painting of "Kraka" has the dimensions of 223 x 149 cm.

Kraka was a Norse princess. She caught the attention of the old king Ragnar Lodbrok thanks to her immense beauty. Before Ragnar took Kraka to his wife he wanted to bring her wisdom to a test. Ragnar invited Kraka to dinner and told her at the same time that she should neither be dressed nor undressed. Kraka survived the challenge by coming dressed in a fishing net. This is the story of the Norse fairy figure Kraka in the Norse mythology. Kraka is also known as the legendary Aslög (Aslaug) in the Norse mythology. She is the daughter of Sigurd and Brynhild Fafnesbane, wife of Ragnar Lodbrok. Aslaug, Aslög, Kraka, Kráka or Randalin, was a queen of Scandinavian mythology who appears in Snorri’s Edda, the Völsunga saga and the saga of Ragnar Lodbrok. Some other Swedish painters, who had earlier painted "Kraka", are Mårten Eskil Winge (1825–1896) and August Malmström (1829–1901).

=== Engagement and marriage: 1905 ===
David Wallin was engaged in springtime 1905 and in September the same year he married his fellow artist Elin Wallin, born Lundberg (1884–1969). The wedding was on September 14, 1905, in Sankt Nikolai kyrka in Örebro (The Church of Saint Nicolai in Örebro), Elin's hometown. After the wedding the couple made a combined wedding and study trip to Paris and London during the years 1905–1906. The couple eventually became the parents of seven children, five daughters and two sons, born in 1906 to 1924.

=== Artistic influences ===
Among Wallin's favorites in Paris were Jean-François Millet, Pierre Puvis de Chavannes and Gustave Moreau. Jean-François Millet was a French painter and one of the founders of the Barbizon school in rural France. Millet is noted for his scenes of peasant farmers, he can be categorized as part of the naturalism and realism movements. Pierre Puvis de Chavannes was a French painter, who became the president and co-founder of the Société Nationale des Beaux-Arts and whose work influenced many other artists. Gustave Moreau was a French Symbolist painter, a late nineteenth-century art movement of French and Belgian origin, whose main focus was the illustration of biblical and mythological figures. He was the movement's inspirational teacher, and he did much for the era. He was a professor at the École des Beaux-Arts in Paris, he pushed his students to think outside of the lines of formality and to follow their visions. Wallin also became acquainted with the works of Édouard Manet, Pierre-Auguste Renoir, and other impressionists artists painting in the style of impressionism, an association of Paris-based artists.

In London Wallin studied the Pre-Raphaelite Brotherhood (also known as the Pre-Raphaelites) and other groups, including James McNeill Whistler, who was an American-born, British-based artist. In London there were major collections of Pre-Raphaelite work in the Tate Gallery (Tate Modern or simply Tate) and Victoria and Albert Museum. Tate is Britain's national gallery of international modern art and forms and V&A is the world's largest museum of decorative arts and design.

David Wallin's own portrait "Portrait of my Wife" was shown at "Le Salon", Salon (Paris), at the Grand Palais des Champs-Elysées on Avenue Alexandre III in Paris. This portrait was a portrait with a sitting model in silver-grey colors which are outlined against dimmed masses of leaves. The avenue Champs-Élysées was located adjacent to the Palais de l’Élysee (Élysée Palace) and the presidential palace, with its rounded gate, and the Grand Palais, was built in the late 19th century. The "Grand Palais" (Big Palace) was a large glass exhibition hall that was built for the Paris Exhibition of 1900. It was located in the 8th arrondissement of Paris.

=== Early subjects, early important portraits and other motifs ===
The subject matter of David Wallin's earliest independent paintings was associated with his native soil, for instance his "Family Estate" (1898). The most important among them, “The Boy and the Migratory Birds”. The big painting reveals the influence of the French painter Jean-François Millet, but is clearly inspired by real life.

A number of chiaroscuro portraits (an artistic technique) testify to his infatuation with Rembrandt during his student days at the Academy. Chiaroscuro is Italian for “light-dark” in art and is characterized by strong contrasts between light and dark, usually bold contrasts affecting a whole composition. It is also a technical term used by artists and art historians for using contrasts of light to achieve a sense of volume in modeling three-dimensional objects such as the human body. Chiaroscuro originated during the Renaissance as drawing on coloured paper, where the artist worked from this base tone towards light, with white gouache, and dark, with ink, bodycolour or watercolour. The French use of the term, clair-obscur, was introduced in the seventeenth century. In photography, chiaroscuro is often effected with the use of "Rembrandt lighting".

Another motif was that of his wife and the mother-child theme, e.g. "Spring"(1905), an oil portrait of his wife in the Lill-Jans Forest in Stockholm. Several sketches of his wife show coloristic free and easy manners. Some oils include "Elin sewing" (1905), "Elin against blue sky" (1905), and "Elin in sunshine" (1906).

In 1908, Wallin was awarded an Academy travel fellowship from the Academy's special fund, which was later extended for another year. The following year, in 1909, he received the Wohlfahrt Award. The scholarship was an award of financial aid for the student to further education. The criteria of the award was that the value and the purpose would further his artistic education. The awards allowed him to live, first in Italy, and then in France during the period 1908–1913, with only brief visits to his native country and to Spain.

=== Italy: 1908-1910 ===
In Italy, Wallin was based in Rome and Florence during the years 1908–1910 together with his family, his wife and his three daughters at that time. In Rome the family stayed at Via Frattina. Numerous sketches and jottings in his sketchbooks testify to studies of Renaissance painting. His own compositional ideas often consist of vague sketches with one or more figures in a dimly suggested landscape, often romantic couples.

In Rome he painted figures and street-life studies in addition to portraits, including several of "Mrs. Carin Lidman", born Thiel, later Mrs. Carin Östberg. In 1919 she married the famous Swedish architect and artist Ragnar Östberg, most famous for designing Stockholm City Hall. Ragnar Östberg was also Professor of Architecture at the Art Academy in Stockholm architecture school from 1922 to 1932. Wallin's portrait of Mrs. Carin Lidman shows a shimmering young womanhood which is reproduced in richly nuanced, scented colors.

Wallin spent two summers at the Scandinavian Artists’ colony (or Art colony) at Volterra in Tuscany, where he returned to a genre that he had embarked on at home, it was that of nudes in a landscape. His wife and children served as models. The best of these studies suggest the love of light playing on skin and greenery so typical of plein-air painting. Volterra is a small town 45 km southwest of Florence.

=== Paris: 1910-1913 ===
In 1910 the family moved to Paris at Rue de l’Abbé Grégoire, a street in 6th arrondissement in Paris, where they were friends with, among others, the circle surrounding Erik Tryggelin (1878–1962), a Swedish painter and photographer, and Gottfrid Larsson (1875–1947), a Swedish sculptor. Both of them also studied in Paris with scholarship. In springtime in 1912 Wallin and his wife Elin were the parents of four children, four girls born in 1906, 1907, 1909 and 1912, so it was natural that David's motifs often were the mother-child theme.

Wallin was first introduced to modern contemporary painting in Paris, where he visited André Lhote and Kees van Dongen. André Lhote, (1885–1962) was a French sculptor and painter of figure subjects, portraits, landscapes and still life. André Lhote was influenced by Gauguin and Cézanne and Cézanne held his first one-man exhibition at the Galerie Druet in 1910. Nevertheless, 19th-century painting remained Wallin's preference. Kees van Dongen (1877–1968), usually known as just Van Dongen, was a Dutch painter and one of the Fauves. Fauvism is the style of les Fauves (French for "the wild beasts"), a short-lived and loose group of early twentieth-century modern artists whose works emphasized painterly qualities and strong colour over the representational or realistic values retained by Impressionism. While Fauvism as a style began around 1900 and continued beyond 1910, the movement as such lasted only a few years, 1904–1908, and had three exhibitions. Kees van Dongen gained a reputation for his sensuous, at times garish, portraits.

Wallin studied modern works at the Gertrude Stein’s modern art gallery in Paris. Much of Gertrude Stein's fame derives from a private modern art gallery she assembled, from 1904 to 1913 when she lived in Paris, with her brother Leo Stein, an art critic. The Steins were important collectors and supporters of Henri Matisse's paintings.

Wallin also studied modern works in the Edmond Auguste Pellerin’s collection of Paul Cézanne’s painting collection and at exhibitions. Wallin exhibited several compositions at "Le Salon (Paris)" in addition to "Portrait of Elin", "Au Soleil", a nude on the shore, bathed in light, and "L’air du printemps", painted in Italy in 1910. Le Salon was the official art exhibition of the Académie des Beaux-Arts in Paris. "By the Wellspring of Life", too, is characterized by a diffuse setting into which he has introduced the movements of playing children and water. Wallin's palette is ascetic and suggests the influence of Puvis de Chavannes. Pierre Puvis de Chavannes was a French painter, who became the president and co-founder of the Société Nationale des Beaux-Arts and whose work influenced many other artists. "In the Beginning" is reminiscent of Eugène Carrière's romantic visions of the mother-child bond. Eugène Carrière was a French symbolist artist of the Fin de siècle period. Carrière was one of the leaders in the secessionist movement, which led to the founding of the Société Nationale des Beaux-Arts. "Resting Negro" was detect the influence of Paul Gauguin’s "The Spirit of the Dead Awakens". Wallin had copied details taken from Paul Cézanne and Paul Gauguin.

=== Back in Sweden: 1913 ===
The décor of the wedding room at the Stockholm Court House

After his return to Sweden in the autumn 1913 Wallin occupied himself with proposals for the décor of the wedding room at the Stockholm Court House (Swedish: Stockholms Rådhus) – a Frieze of Life, now in the Lund University’s Archives for the Decorative Arts in Lund in Sweden (also known as Museum of Sketches for Public Art). Stockholm Court House is situated on Kungsholmen in Central Stockholm, Sweden. The building was constructed between 1909 and 1915. The décoration of the wedding room at the Stockholm Court House had been preceded of three competitions (1912–1914) which had attracted a big number of artists of the time. The fight for the decoration of the wedding room in the new Stockholm Court House became one of the most dramatic in the Swedish history of monumental art. Proposals for the wedding room also came from for instance the artists Isaac Grünewald and Georg Pauli. At last, the decorative paintings in fresco in the wedding room were painted by the artist, master house painter and ornamental painter Filip Månsson, an artist who had earlier carried out décor paintings in the building.

Other works

Wallin also worked on the mother-child theme: portraits of young girls, children, and nudes. Much was a continuation of earlier ideas. His pictures of children are often characterized by a fragile fairy tale atmosphere, such as "A Little Bud on a Green Meadow" (1914) and "Story Time in the Garden" (1918). The nudes are based on the contrast of light and shadow, movement and rest, "Spring Holiday" (1914). In this big painting with the format 168 x 129 cm the artist shows something of his best nude painting. In 1999 the painting was donated to Moderna museet in Stockholm (the Museum of Modern Art, Stockholm).

In 1914 David Wallin participated in the Baltic exhibition (Baltiska utställningen), which was an arts and crafts exhibition held in Malmö in the castle Malmöhus (now Malmö Art Museum) during the period May 15 – October 4, 1914. The Baltic countries of that time, Sweden, Denmark, Germany and Russia, were represented in the exhibition. The Swedish architect Ferdinand Boberg was responsible for the shaping of the exhibition.

David Wallin exhibited at the Association of Swedish Artists’ exhibition in Stockholm in 1917 in Liljevalchs konsthall in Stockholm, which was built in 1916. The exhibition devoted a separate room to Wallin's art. August Brunius was responsible for the most favourable reviews in which he proclaimed Wallin a very special force to be reckoned with within Swedish art, both in terms of his compositions and as the creator of a world of his own.

He has an emotional world of his own which focuses with special intensity on the mother-child theme. We have to return to the classical painting of old to find a woman of the monumentality of "A Young Swedish Girl" or "Ragnhild" (created 1914, signed 1916), and to modern Norwegian art to find the equivalent of Wallin's moving studies of children. The spiritual element sometimes emerges too forcefully, but it never turns cheap or sentimental. The physicality, both of the phenomenon itself and of the painting, is ever present”. (August Brunius in Svenska Dagbladet, May 16, 1917). "Ragnhild", 73 x 79 cm, can be counted as a portrait, but it is sooner a composition, where the artist with inspiration and accuracy has brought about a fascinating evening lighting. "Ragnhild" was exhibited nine times, both in Sweden and abroad, from 1917 to 1952. In 1998 the painting was donated to the Östergötlands länsmuseum in Linköping (Östergötland County Museum).

"The Salmon Fisherman" (1915–1919) constitutes an undisputed high point. The mood of nature is combined with deep, but yet restrained, feeling, filled with grief. Wallin's preference for running water reminds us that in his youth he was an ardent admirer of Ernst Josephson.

Two altarpieces and a self-portrait

Two altarpieces from this period, 1919 and 1920, are in the churches in Valdemarsvik and Bureå. The altarpiece in Valdemarsvik church, in Östergötland, represents "Christ and the Sinking Peter" (1919). The other altarpiece, in Bureå church, in Västerbotten, represents "Jesus Blessing the Children" (1919–1920). An important self-portrait is also from this period, "On the Balcony by the Sea" (composition, signed 1916). The self-portrait, 120 x 90 cm, was donated in 1999 by David Wallin's heirs to the Art Museum of Norrköping in Östergötland (Norrköpings konstmuseum). The portrait was created during a very active period of the artist's life, when he was inspired of magnificent nature in harmony with his inner emotionally flows.

=== 1920s and 1930s ===
In the 1920s Wallin continued on the path of the free composition in which he strove for a synthesis of color and the play of light. His subject matter was usually nature, mother and child. David Wallin has exhibited in Paris, Vienna, Berlin, Munich, Dresden, Rome, Venice, Copenhagen, Budapest, Reval, Riga, Turku, Helsinki, Buenos Aires and in several U.S. cities, in Stockholm at Liljevalchs, Baltic Exhibition in Malmö in 1914, solo exhibition in "Nordic Art" at Gothenburg Jubilee Exhibition in 1923 and solo exhibition at Konstakademien (Royal Swedish Academy of Arts in Stockholm) in 1926. Göteborgs Konsthall was built as an art exhibition hall for the Jubilee Fair of Gothenburg in 1923, Gothenburg Exhibition (1923). Göteborgs Konsthall later became a part of Gothenburg Museum of Art. The museum building, at Götaplatsen in the center of the city, was created for the international exhibition in Gothenburg 1923 celebrating the city's 300th anniversary. The inaugural exhibition in Göteborgs Konsthall was the Jubilee Exhibition of Nordic contemporary art. The exhibition which took place between May 8 and October 15, 1923, was a muster of the Nordic breakthrough generation of modernism.

Some of the paintings exhibited in David Wallin's solo Jubilee Exhibition in Gothenburg 1923 and in Stockholm at Konstakademien 1926 were:

The big painting "Summer" (created 1914, signed 1923), 201 x 157 cm, was exhibited in 1926. The painting represents a standing nude woman, and it pays homage to the woman and it is representative for David Wallin's nude painting. Then the painting has been exhibited both abroad in Vienna, Budapest, Riga and in Stockholm at his big solo exhibition at Konstakademien 1931 and 1932. In 1998 the painting was also donated to the Östergötlands länsmuseum in Linköping (Östergötland County Museum), and the painting has now been deposit with the castle of Linköping.

At the same time the oil painting "Springtime in the forest" (1914–1925), 118 x 94 cm, was also donated to Linköping (Östergötland County Museum). It is a composition with a forest landscape with two figures. An old man is sitting by a tree trunk and a young girl is going with springy steps on the forest road, showing the artist's typically philosophizing presentation of the motif. "Under the Tree", was exhibited 1926 and "Mother and Child" was also exhibited 1926. "Mother and Child" is in the collections of the Budapest art museum in Hungary, Museum of Fine Arts (Budapest) (in Hungarian: Szépművészeti Múzeum). In 1926 the paintings "Arilds fishing village" ("Arilds läge") and "Memories of youth" were purchased by Nationalmuseum in Stockholm (National Museum of Fine Arts in Sweden).

During the 1930s David Wallin continued to devote himself to nudes, the relationship between man and nature, and the bond between mother and child. He painted "In the Summertime" (1932), and "At the Seaside of Arild" (1932). The latter earned him an Olympic Gold Medal at the 1932 Summer Olympics in Los Angeles in California in the United States of America. "Father at Ninety" (1929) represents a rare departure from these themes.

=== 1932 Summer Olympics ===
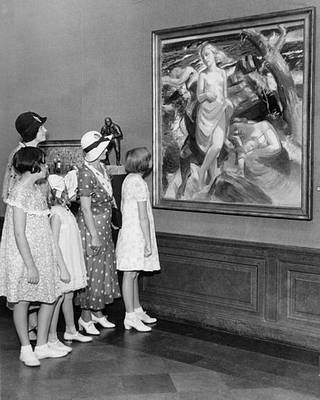
The artwork which is getting admiring focus of attention is "At the Seaside of Arild" by the artist David Wallin from Sweden. The oilpainting won an Olympic Gold Medal in the class of painting in the 1932 Summer Olympics in Los Angeles in the Art competitions at the 1932 Summer Olympics.

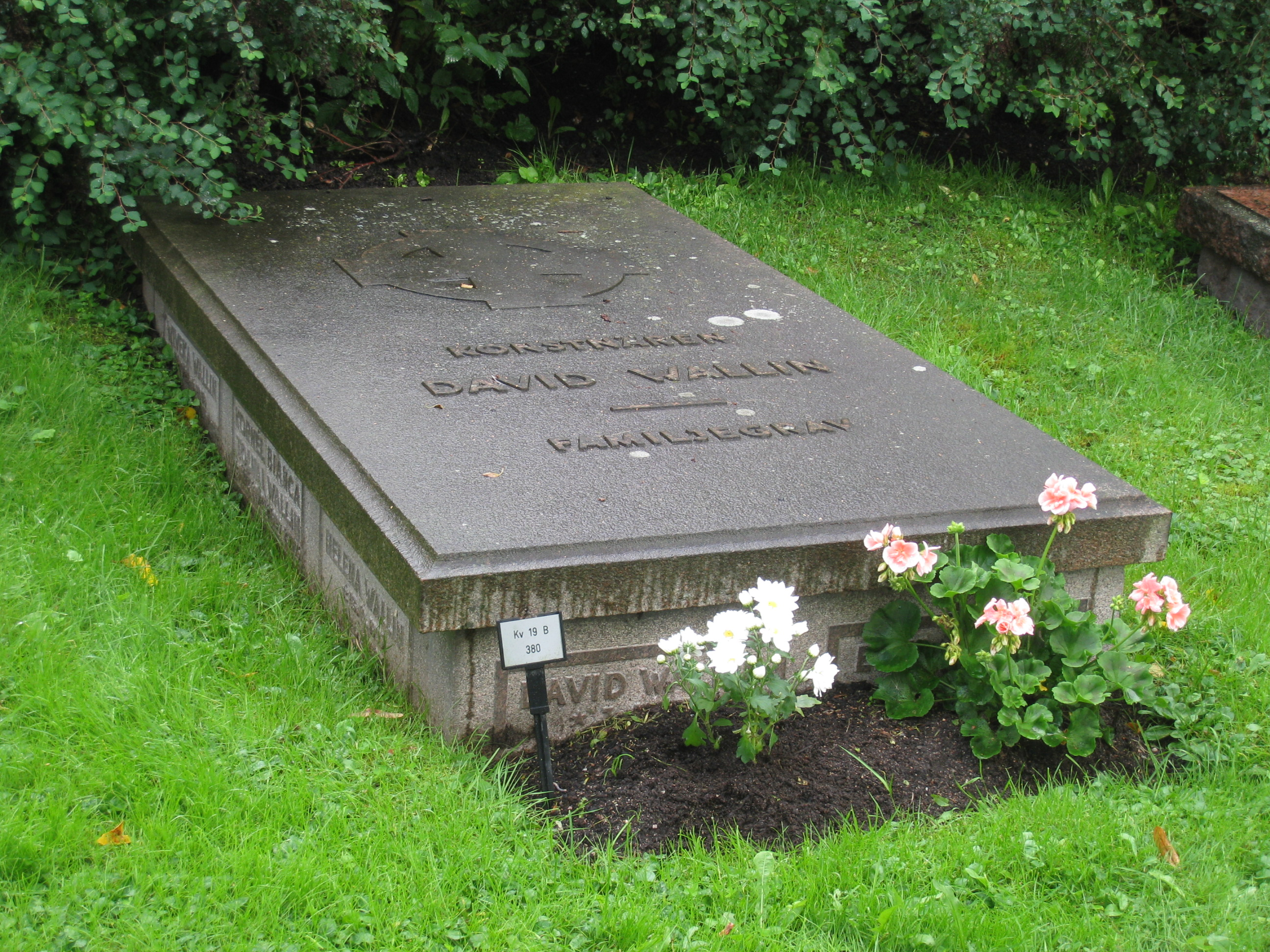
David Wallin Family grave at Norra begravningsplatsen in Solna, outside Stockholm.

David Wallin won the Olympic Gold Medal in painting in Los Angeles, California, United States, in the 1932 Summer Olympics in the United States of America. Art competitions were held as part of 1932 Summer Olympics in Los Angeles, United States. Medals were awarded in five categories (architecture, literature, music, painting and sculpture) for works inspired by sport-related themes. David Wallin won an Olympic Gold Medal in the Art competitions at the 1932 Summer Olympics in painting of the Olympic Games for his oil painting "At the Seaside of Arild". The Gold Medal was won in competition with names like Isaac Grünewald and Bruno Liljefors. After the success with the Olympic Gold Medal Wallin was invited over to the United States to do a tour with a touring exhibition. He visited New York City, among other places. Art competitions were part of the Olympic program from 1912 to 1948, but were discontinued due to concerns about amateurism and professionalism. Since 1952 a non-competitive art and cultural festival has been associated with each Games.

=== 1940s and 1950s ===
The 1940s and 1950s brought new variations on the theme figure in landscape. He painted "On my Island in the Archipelago" (1940), "Salmon Fishermen in Ådalen" (1943) and "Midsummer’s Eve" (1945). At the same time, he also devoted himself to pure landscape painting such as the pictures of Arild at the foot of Kullaberg in Scania. Arild was a fishing village and seaside resort as well as a resort for artists and writers. The coastline at Arild constitute a special landscape. It is a rocky coast with cobblestone flat rocks and rauk-like rocks. Arild was also an artist colony with famous names such as Gustaf Rydberg, Gustaf Cederström, Fritz von Dardel, Olof Krumlinde, Isaac Grünewald, Nathanael Beskow, Richard Bergh and Herman Österlund and more Skagen Painters, who gathered at Mother Cilla inn. In Kullaberg they were able to take advantage of the particularly strong summer light, reminiscent of that of Skagen. Wallin also made pure landscape painting with pictures of Omberg (Omberg, a mountain in western Östergötland along Vättern's eastern shore), Scania (Scania in the southernmost of Sweden), Bohuslän (Bohuslän on the west coast of Sweden), Västmanlands bergslag (the western Västmanland traditionally belonged to the mining district of Bergslagen), Norrland (Norrland in the Northland of Sweden) and Norwegian landscapes.

David Wallin's sketches are part of his long career as an artist. Several canvases and smaller sketches, which include landscapes and nudes, fuse reality and fantasy through his use of impressionistic, subjective color.

=== Portrait painting ===
David Wallin's portrait gallery contains the features of many leading personalities within Swedish cultural life.

Among the most famous early oil portraits, often chiaroscuro, are the portraits of the artist Axel Fahlkrantz (1851–1925) (1904), the poet and writer Erik Axel Karlfeldt (1904), the university president and architect Viktor Adler (1907), the founder of the telephone company Telefonaktiebolaget L M Ericsson Lars Magnus Ericsson and wife, the founder of the color company Wilhelm Becker (1904), Mrs. Granberg (1904), the young girl Barbro Gyllenhammar (1904), Portrait of the Publisher Saxon (1907), and the count and fellow artist, professor at the Royal Swedish Academy of Arts in Stockholm Count Georg von Rosen (1908), depicting meditating in front of a painting.

Among the most famous portraits in oil of prominent Swedes later on are Mrs Waldenström (1914), the professor, mathematician Gösta Mittag-Leffler (1920), the author, phonetician, philologist and professor Fredrik Wulff (1922), the professor of literature and cultural history Henrik Schück (1923), the Swedish sculptor Carl Milles (1925), the councilman, director general and politician Bo von Stockenström (1926), the wife of Bo von Stockenström Anna von Stockenström (1926), Countess Magnus Brahe (1927), the professor, philosopher and jurist Axel Hägerström (1929), the doctor and Nobel Laureate Gustaf Dalén (1929), the general and politician Carl Gustaf Hammarskjöld (1930), the lord mayor in Örebro and president at Örebro Savings Bank Victor Schneider (1934), the professor and surgeon Abraham Troell (1938), the Swedish Minister for Foreign Affairs in the National Unity Government Christian Günther (1939) and the actor and prominent opera singer John Forsell.

=== Sensibilities ===
David Wallin has often been described as unabashedly romantic. And he could, in fact, arguably be said to be “the last romantic in Sweden”, inasmuch as his approach to life often remained colored by the atmosphere at the turn-of-the-century. He strove to meld the intimate and the monumental in lyrically colored moods – which meant that he gradually distanced himself from modern trends in painting. This approach was deliberate. Wallin never ceased stressing the gap that existed between his own ideals and much of what broke through in today's art. He wanted to remain faithful to these ideals.

=== Exhibitions and memberships ===
Wallin had about ten solo exhibitions in Sweden from 1926 to 1953 and about ten Swedish Group Shows in Sweden from 1905 to 1941 and numerous exhibitions sponsored by the Östergötland Art Association in various places in Östergötland. He had about twentyfive exhibitions abroad from 1906 to 1936. Wallin was a member of Swedish Artists’ Association, The Artists’ Club in Stockholm and Union Internationale des Beaux-Arts et des Lettres in Paris.

== Collections ==
In addition to the Budapest Museum in Hungary, Museum of Fine Arts (Budapest), and the Archives for Decorative Art (The Museum of Sketches) in Lund in the south of Sweden mentioned above, Wallin is also represented in

- Nationalmuseum, Stockholm (National Museum of Art in Stockholm)
- Nordiska museet (Nordic Museum), Stockholm
- The Collection of H.M. King Carl XVI Gustaf of Sweden, Stockholm, Stockholm
- Stockholms Stadshus (Stockholm City Hall), Stockholm
- Kungl. Musikaliska Akademien, Stockholm (Royal Swedish Academy of Music)
- Konstnärsklubben, Stockholm (The Artists’ Club, Stockholm)
- Prins Eugens Waldemarsudde, Stockholm (Prince Eugen’s Waldemarsudde).
- Millesgården, Lidingö, Stockholm
- Norrköpings konstmuseum (The Art Museum of Norrköping)
- Malmö konstmuseum (The Art Museum of Malmö)
- Konstmuseet Östersund (Art Museum, Östersund)
- Östergötlands länsmuseum in Linköping (Östergötland County Museum), http://www.ostergotlandslansmuseum.se/eng.html
- Konstmuseet in Motala (The Art Museum of Motala) (Charlottenborgs slott)
- Uppsala Universitets konstsamling in Uppsala (The art collection of Uppsala University, Uppsala) (Stockholms nation) (The portrait of Henrik Schück)
- The museum at Tours, France.

In his youth, Wallin sometimes signed his name as Valin, Walin, or Vallin.

== Sources ==
- Svenskt Konstnärslexikon, Who's Who in Swedish Art, Volume 5, page 577-579, Allhems Förlag AB, Malmö, 1967, author Viggo Loos (1895–1974), a Swedish newspaper editor, art publicist and Doctor of Philosophy in Art History.
- David Wallin in the art dictionary Konstnärslexikonett Amanda, http://www.lexikonettamanda.se/show.php?aod=15260.
- David Wallin in Bra Böckers Lexikon, Bokförlaget Bra Böcker AB, Höganäs, 1982, Volume 24, page 156. (A picture of the portrait of Gustaf Dalén by David Wallin in Volume 5, page 147.)
- Olympic Games Art Competition 1932
- Wallinska släktarkivet, Kungl. Biblioteket, Humlegården, Stockholm, ACC2008_024, Ediffah. Accessionsnummer ACC2008_024.
- Wallinska släktarkivet, tillägg (fotografier), Kungl. Biblioteket, Stockholm, ACC2008_137, Ediffah. Accessionsnummer ACC2008_137.
- David Wallins papper rörande hans konstnärliga verksamhet, Kungl. Biblioteket, Humlegården, Stockholm, ACC2008_138, Ediffah. Accessionsnummer ACC2008_138.
- David Wallin in Nordiska museets arkiv, Beståndsregister, med placering i Garnisonen. Arkivbildare, arkiv 5900, D. Wallin (of) D. Wallins gåva ACC NR 1932/087. Nordiska museet lagt in på pdf-fil 2011-02-17. David Wallin finns på sid 70 av 468 sidor. D. Wallins gåva, accessionsnummer ACC NR 1932/087.
- David Wallin in Nordisk Familjebok, Uggleupplagan, 38, Supplement. (1926), page 1164, https://runeberg.org/nfcr/0628.html, author Georg Nordensvan (1855–1932), a Swedish art historian writer, art critic and publicist.
- David Wallin in Vem är det, Svensk biografisk handbok, 1933, page 884-885, https://runeberg.org/vemardet/1933/0884.html.
- David Wallin in Vem är det, Svensk biografisk handbok, 1943, page 870, https://runeberg.org/vemardet/1943/0870.html.
- David Wallin in Vem är vem?, Stockholmsdelen, 1945, page 925, https://runeberg.org/vemarvem/sthlm45/0941.html
- David Wallin in Salmonsens konversationsleksikon, Anden Udgave, Bind XXIV, page 461 (1915–1930), https://runeberg.org/salmonsen/2/24/0471.html.
- The Games of the Xth Olympiad Los Angeles 1932 (PDF). Xth Olympiade Committee of the Games of Los Angeles, U.S.A. 1932. 1933. pp. 748–765. Archived from the original (PDF) on 2008-04-10.
- Wagner, Juergen. "Olympic Art Competition 1932". Olympic Games Museum. Archived from the original on 2008-05-01.
- Kramer, Bernhard (May 2004). "In Search of the Lost Champions of the Olympic Art Contests" (PDF). Journal of Olympic History. 12 (2): 29–34. Archived (PDF) from the original on 2008-04-10.
- Evans, Hilary; Gjerde, Arild; Heijmans, Jeroen; Mallon, Bill; et al. "David Wallin". Olympics at Sports-Reference.com. Sports Reference LLC. Archived from the original on 2020-04-17.

== Other links ==
- List of Olympic medalists in art competitions
- Olympic Museum: Olympic Games Art Competition 1932, Art Competitions and Exhibitions https://web.archive.org/web/20080501135344/http://www.olympic-museum.de/art/1932.htm
- Lokalhistoria, Öden, David Wallin, by Anders Karlin, Norrköpings stadsmuseum, January 2003, https://web.archive.org/web/20081108034603/http://www.edu.linkoping.se/.
- David Wallin 1876–1957, Kulturarv Östergötland, Personer, Levnadsöden, Östergötlands länsmuseum, Anders Karlin, Norrköpings stadsmuseum, January 2003. http://www.kulturarvostergotland.se/Article.aspx?m=332518&a=335708.
- Ahlströms Myntauktioner No. 64, Rådmansgatan 21, Stockholm, Auction November 24, 2001 (gold medal, Olympic Games, Los Angeles, 1932).
- ”Guld i måleri”, Aftonbladet, Kultur, June 19, 2002.
- Gunnar Hagberg and Magnus Höjer, ”Från Pelle till Pillan – Östgötarna i OS”, ”Guldmålaren från Vikbolandet”, article from Östergötlands Idrottsförbund, September 2002.
- Håkan Sandblad, radio journalist, Gothenburg, Article in SOF Bulletin Nr 2, 2009, about the art in the Olympic Games ”Only Coubertin wanted to have art in the Olympic Games. “The Swedes received four extra medals”.
