= Carl Wallin =

Carl Wallin may refer to:

- Carl E. Wallin (1879–1968), Swedish-American artist
- Carl Georg August Wallin (1893–1978), Swedish mariner painter
- Carl Wallin (shot putter) (born 1941), American shot putter, 1965 NCAA indoor shot put runner-up for the Northwestern Wildcats track and field team
