= Bråxvik =

Nature reserve in Östergötland, Sweden

Coordinates: 58°33′56″N 16°46′21″E

- Interactive map of Bråxvik
- Type: Nature Reserve
- Location: Norrköping municipality, Östergötland County, Sweden
- Area: 97.26 ha (240.3 acres)
- Established: January 13, 2003

Bråxvik is a nature reserve in Norrköping municipality in Östergötland county.

The area has been nature protected since 2002 and is 97 hectares in size. The reserve is located in the north-eastern part of Vikbolandet. The reserve consists of old coniferous forest, mainly pine, and seashore meadows.
