= Sigurd Wallin =

Swedish artist (1916–1999)

David Sigurd Wallin (June 10, 1916 in Nora rural parish in Örebro County, Sweden – May 8, 1999 in Stockholm, Sweden) was a Swedish artist. He grew up in Stockholm.

Sigurd Wallin was the son of the Swedish artist David Wallin (1876–1957) and his wife Elin Wallin (1884–1969; born in Lundberg, Stockholm). He was the brother of the artist Bianca Wallin (1909–2006). His uncle was the Swedish-American artist Carl E. Wallin (1879–1968). In 1945 he married Margit, born Ruuth; the couple settled down in Stockholm, Sweden, and had two daughters.

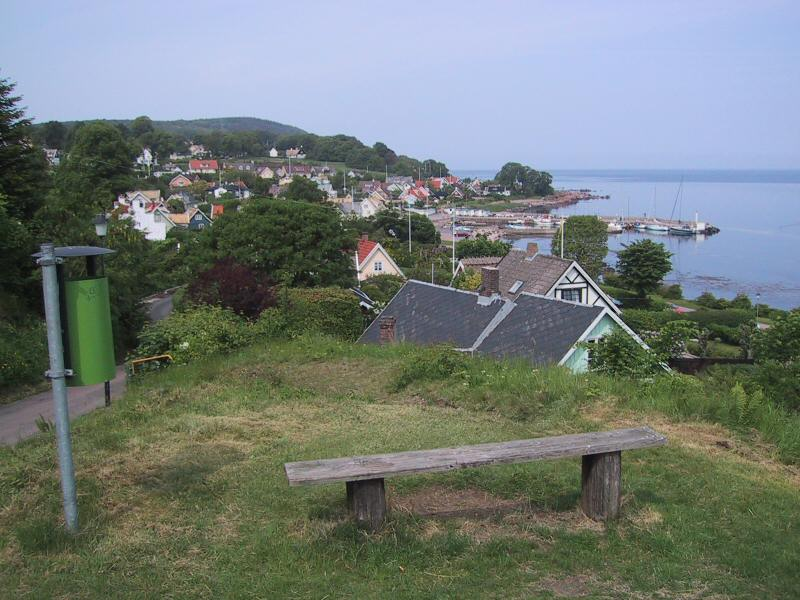
The landscape around Arild, with its especially strong summer light, was a popular motif for Sigurd Wallin. Here, a view over the fishing port in Arild.

To find motifs for his oil paintings, Sigurd Wallin made annual summer trips, most often to Scania, especially to the neighbourhood of Arild, Mölle and Båstad.

Arild was originally an old fishing village, known as Arildsläge (Arild's fishing village). On Kullaberg in Arild the artists benefited from an especially strong summer light that reminded them of Skagen light, and many Swedish artists were therefore active in Arild and Kullabygden. Mölle is on Kullen peninsula at the foot of Kullaberg.

From the beginning Mölle was a fishing village, as was Arild. Båstad is the largest urban village in the area of Bjärehalvön (Bjäre peninsula) and it is located at Hallandsåsen with lively summer tourists who put their stamp on the place. Båstad has the largest outdoor facilities for tennis in the Nordic countries, and is also known for its beaches; the resort was once known as a spa and there are still several guesthouses. In this region of Scania, Sigurd Wallin found many fine motifs for his oil paintings.

== Biography ==
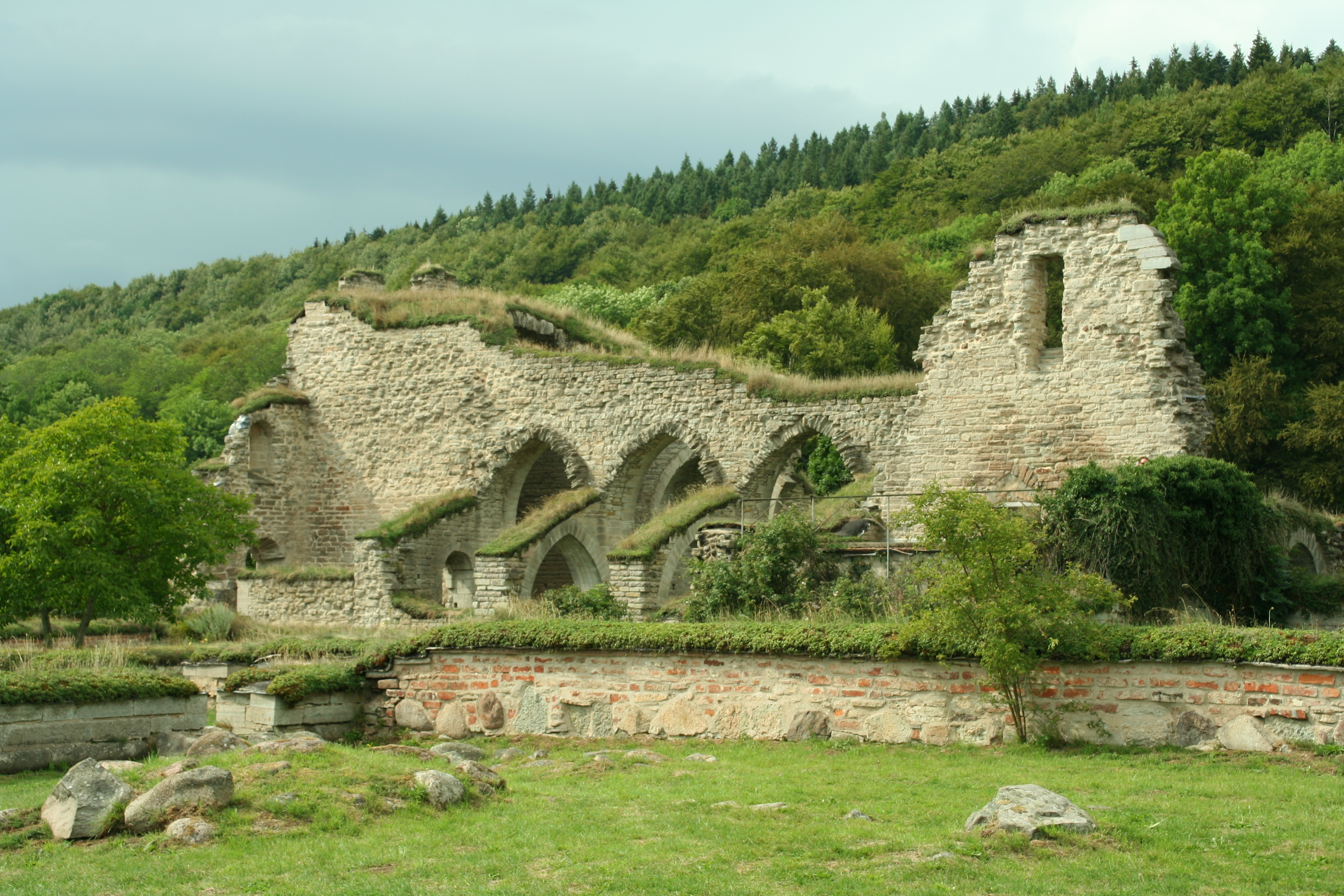
Alvastra Monastery, ruins of the monastery. In the 1530s the monastery was demolished and it was never rebuilt.

Sigurd Wallin grew up in Kungsholmen in Stockholm. In 1928, when Sigurd was about 12 years old the family moved to Östermalm in Stockholm. He graduated from Sigtunaskolan a Swedish boarding school located in Sigtuna, Sweden, in the spring of 1935. After that he practiced in the architect profession, among other places at the architect office of architect Albin Stark in Stockholm during the years 1937 to 1939.

He was also interested in archaeology and he participated in the excavations in the vicinity of Alvastra, Alvastra Abbey and the settlement of Alvastra. Alvastra is a small village, next to Omberg, near Ödeshög in Östergötland in eastern Sweden. It is known for being the seat of the Cistercian Alvastra Abbey in the Middle Ages. In the 1530s the monastery was demolished and it was never rebuilt. The preparation was done by students in art history and in archaeology and also by workers under the led by Otto Frödin (1881-1953), or some other experienced archaeologist. The Alvastra monastery ruin is today well preserved and a popular place to visit. However Wallins interest in art, which he had received in his parents’ home, led him to begin to draw and to paint portraits.

Wallin followed the teaching at times at Edvin Ollers painting school (Edvind Ollers school of painting) in Stockholm 1940-1944. Edvin Ollers (1888-1959) was a designer, an artist and a qualified art teacher and had studied at the Konstindustriskolan in Stockholm. During the summer Edvin Ollers led a school of painting on the Swedish West Coast on the island Gullholmen in Bohuslän in Orust outside Lysekil, on the artists Gullholmen. Gullholmen was originally one of the oldest fishing villages in Sweden.

Sigurd Wallin painted from models at Otte Skölds målarskola (Otte Sköld school of painting) in Stockholm. In the 1940s Otte Sköld Studio, as it was known in a prospectus, was situated in Snickarbacken 7 in Stockholm. Otte Sköld, who was a Swedish artist, draftsman and printmaker, had a central place in Stockholm’s cultural life during the 1940s and 1950s. He pursued art education during much of his life. In Paris in the 1920s he ran together with Danish and Norvegian colleagues Académie Scandinave. The school was arranged as a pure art school after the classic pattern by teaching daytime and evening. The school functioned as a "nursery" for further study at the art academy and quickly gained a good reputation. Along with Isaac Grünewalds målarskola (Isaac Grünewald school of painting) it could offer the most significant basic education for its time.

After Åke Pernby’s studies in Paris, in progress since 1923, he began as a caretaker or superintendent at the Académie Scandinave in Paris. There he became friend with Otte Sköld who ran the school of painting. The two friends planned to break up from Paris. They agreed that whoever first came back to Sweden would locate a suitable studio to start a school of painting. The year was 1929 and then the 27-year-old Åke Pernby was first home. It was the beginning of Otte Skölds målarskola (Otte Sköld school of painting). High over the ridge in an old mansion in the penthouse at Snickarbacken 7 in Stockholm he found just the "Parisian" environment he sought. Twenty years later, in 1949, the management was overtaken of Åke Pernby and the name was changed to the present, Pernbys målarskola (Pernby school of painting). When Otte Sköld became head of Nationalmuseum in 1949, Åke Pernby continued to run the school in his own name, during the years 1949-1976. Otte Sköld was also a professor at the Royal Swedish Academy of Arts in 1938-1942, and director of the department in 1941-1950. Otte Sköld was then curator of Nationalmuseum in 1950-1958.

Sigurd Walllin was also a student of his father, David Wallin. He made several trips abroad for art studies, he visited Italy, France, the Netherlands, Germany, Switzerland, Denmark and Norway.

Sigurd Wallin painted in oil, landscapes, cityscapes, figurative compositions and occasionally still life. He liked to paint landscapes, often with ocean. His paintings have a romantic appropriation and preferably a slightly veiled coloring, which tied in with his father’s view of an artist. Wallin also conducted a large number of drawings, mostly portraits. He also devoted himself to preservation for the future and to carry out certain artwork conservation-restoration. That required a good touch and a good insight into the artworks, which should be repaired, and special skills were necessary for the practical application.

Above all Sigurd Wallin worked in portrait painting, where he with technical skill realized the traditional demands for the genre for likeness. Among the portrait paintings there are:

- Portrait of Gerhard Törnqvist (1894-1963), (1961). Gerhard Törnqvist was a Swedish business economist, corporate economist and professor at Stockholm School of Economics, Stockholm, Stockholm School of Economics. The portrait is in Stockholm School of Economics.
- Portrait of Einar Dahl (1904-1979), (1963). Einar Dahl was the head teacher, member of parliament and Uddevalla Mayor. The portrait is in Uddevalla city collections.
- Portrait of Brita Appelgren (1912-1999) (1951). Brita Appelgren was a Swedish ballerina, actress and premiere danseuse at the Royal Swedish Opera i Stockholm during the years 1934-1955. The portrait is in the Royal Swedish Opera in Stockholm.
- Portrait of Per Dahlström and others.

Portrait paintings by Sigurd Wallin is also, inter alia, in many public institutions:

- Swedish University of Agricultural Sciences (Faculty of Veterinary Medicine, Swedish University of Agricultural Sciences (SLU)) (Veterinärhögskolan).
- Högre allmänna läroverket på Kungsholmen in Stockholm
- Södra latinläroverket in Stockholm
- Halmstads stads samlingar in Halmstad
- Sigtunaskolan in Sigtuna
- Göteborgs och Bohus läns landsting in Gothenburg

In the 1940s Wallin appeared in a few exhibitions including Swedish portrait art of today in Nationalmuseum (1943) and the Christmas Exhibition of Thurestam’s Salon at Klarabergsgatan 40 in Stockholm (1943). Wallin exhibited separately at Televerket in Norrköping (1947) and in Sveriges allmänna konstförening’s spring exhibition (Vårsalongen) in Liljevalchs konsthall in Stockholm (1948).

== Sources ==
- Svenskt konstnärslexikon, Allhems förlag AB, Malmö, 1967, volume 5, page 583. Author: Curator Folke Åstrand.
- Sigurd Wallin in Konstnärslexikonett Amanda
- Svenska Konstnärer, Biografisk handbok, 1993, page 549.
