= Carl E. Wallin =

Swedish-American painter

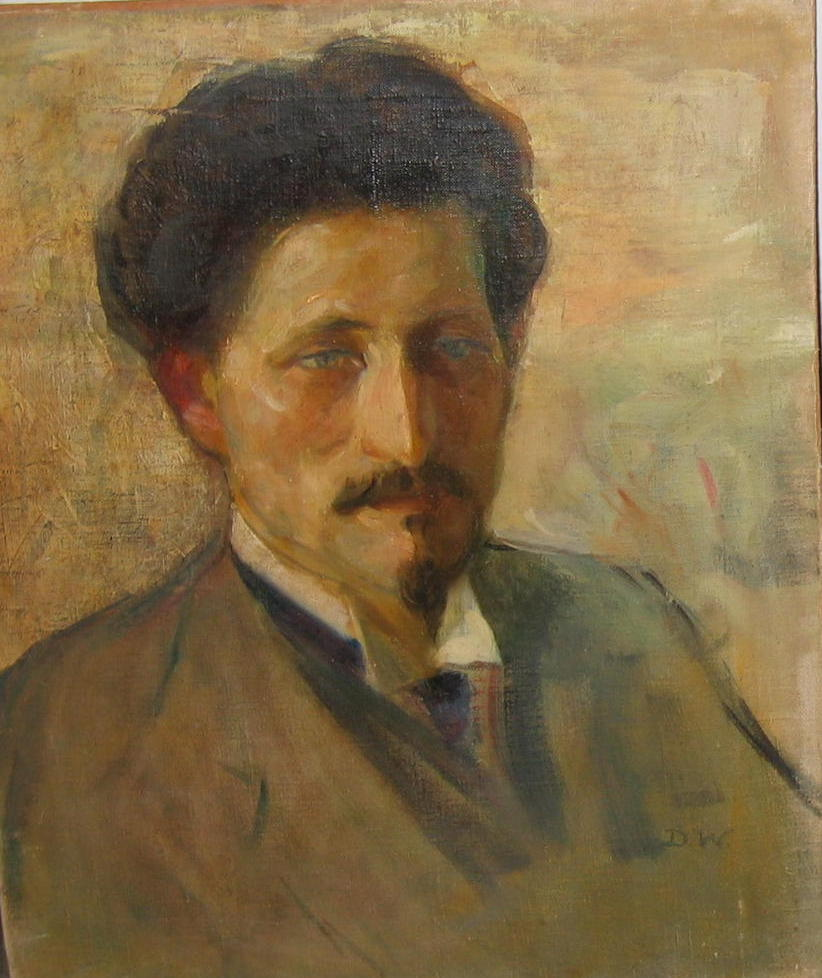
The artist Carl E. Wallin in 1914. Portrait by his brother, the artist David Wallin (1876–1957).

Carl Efraim Wallin (March 22, 1879 - November 12, 1968) was a Swedish-American artist and painting contractor. He was born in Östra Husby parish in the province of Östergötland, Sweden and died in Chicago, Illinois, United States.

== Background ==
Carl E. Wallin was best known for his oil paintings like landscape with figures (landscape art), especially winter landscape painting, portrait painting, figures (drawing), nature painting and symbolic fantasy compositions, related to symbolism (arts). Sometimes he also focused on illustration of biblical and mythological figures, e.g. from the greek mythology. Wallin mostly earned his living as an independent painting contractor with his own staffing agency. He was aliasis: Carl E. Wallin, Carl Ephraim Wallin, Carl Wallin, CE Wallin.

Carl E. Wallin was the son of the local farmer and carpenter Alexander Wallin (1839–1929) and his wife Inga Helena Larsdotter (1841–1887), both of them from Vikbolandet. Carl E. Wallin was the brother of the Swedish artist David Wallin (1876–1957) and he was the uncle of the Swedish artist Bianca Wallin (1909–2006) and the Swedish artist Sigurd Wallin (1916–1999). In 1907 he married Hilma Högberg (1887–1951). He became an American citizen in the early 20th century.

=== Early years ===
Carl E. Wallin grew up on a farm, Varby farmyard, in Östra Husby parish on Vikbolandet east of Norrköping city in the province of Östergötland in Sweden in a large household with many siblings, a sister and four brothers and also some other children in the household within the family. Varby had been in the family since the 17th century. The home was strictly religious, and his father turned to the Bible for daily guidance.

After finishing school Carl worked as a painter's apprentice at 17–18 years of age (1896–1897). In 1898 he moved to Norrköping. He was a non-commissioned officer in Vaxholm in the Stockholm archipelago at the Vaxholm Coastal Artillery Regiment (KA 1), in the Swedish Coastal Artillery, which was just formed in 1902, at 21–23 years of age (1900–1902).

=== The emigration to the United States in 1902 ===
At the age of 23 Carl E. Wallin emigrated to the United States of America in December 1902, and at first he came to Denver in Colorado. From Gothenburg he travelled by boat, by the American lines steamship S/S Rollo, to Grimsby seaport on the eastcoast of England and then by railway via London to Southampton on the south-east coast of England. From Southampton he departed by steamship S/S Saint Paul to New York City. "After crossing the ocean in 7 days" he arrived in New York City on December 14, 1902. From New York City he travelled via Chicago and Kansas City, Kansas, and then he arrived in Denver in Colorado.

=== Studies in Denver and at School of the Art Institute of Chicago ===
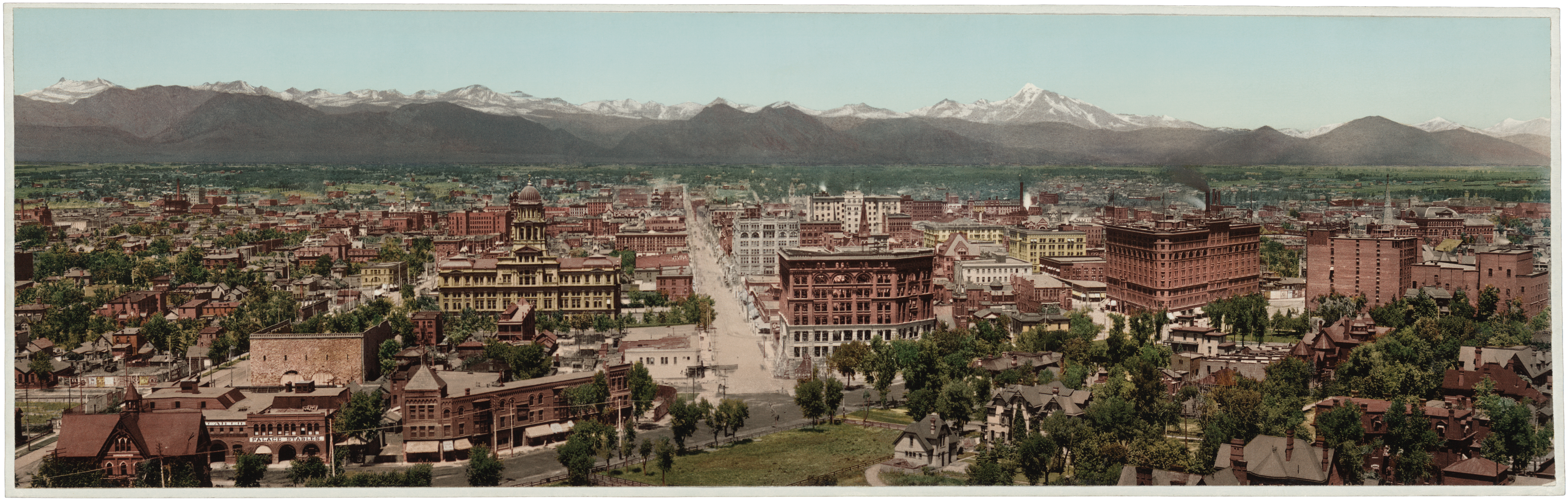
Denver, Colorado, as it looked like in 1898, a few years before Carl E. Wallin arrived there in 1902. The photographer was William Henry Jackson (1843–1942), an American painter, Civil War veteran, geological survey photographer and an explorer famous for his images of the American West.

He stayed in Denver and worked during the days and began studying at an art school in the evenings. Carl E. Wallin had, like his older brother, the artist David Wallin, always been interested in art and got after his arrival to America, "the opportunity to study at Reed's Art School in Denver, Colorado, where he studied at evening teaching for two years (1903–1904)". In 1904 he moved to Chicago, Illinois. Chicago was the city with the second highest number of Swedes after Stockholm, the capital of Sweden (in the year 1900). By then, Swedes in Chicago had founded a church and established such enduring institutions as a hospital and a university. Chicago is the largest city in the state of Illinois.

In Chicago he settled down to study at the art academy at The School of the Art Institute of Chicago (SAIC), Illinois, where he studied for three years (1905–1908). The school is also associated with the encyclopedic fine art museum the Art Institute of Chicago. The School of the Art Institute of Chicago (SAIC) is one of America's largest independent schools of art and design, located in The Loop, Chicago.

=== Marriage and painting contractor in Chicago ===
While studying at the School of the Art Institute of Chicago Carl E. Wallin married Hilma Högberg in 1907, a young girl who was only 20 years old, and Carl was 28 years old. Their first home was in Cook County, Chicago, Illinois and Carl worked as a self-employed and entrepreneurial and ran his own painting company while he painted for his own amusement. He devoted his free time to the art, because he was nearly always occupied to do his work with his business as contractor painter as a self-employed person. Common traits of entrepreneurs are curiosity, creativity, a positive approach to work, independence, perseverance, dedication, optimism and visionary thinking. Chicago in Cook County was Carl's and Hilma's residence city and it is the second most populous county in the United States after Los Angeles County. His wife Hilma Wallin died in 1951.

== Oil paintings and motifs ==
Carl E. Wallin mostly painted in oil and his subjects were portraits and landscapes, often winter motifs, and figures, nature pictures and symbolic fantasy compositions. He was often known for landscapes with figures which was his speciality and he often painted in oil in the style of early 20th-century modernist painting before 1950. He owned an awaken eye for the beautifulness in the nature and for a long time he strived to render everything as true to life as possible on his canvases. Later on his development led into another direction. That was the idea or the thought behind the work of art that was so much important from his part of view. His works also showed a great richness of ideas and fantasy. He did not belong to the ultramodern school. He himself thought that a work of art was unsuccessful if not anyone else but the artist himself could understand it. There ought to be an idea behind every painting.

Wallin's genius is peculiarly his own. He is original and his paintings of fantasy are creations of his own, which remind one of the work of the French artist Gustave Doré. Gustave Doré is an artist who has been labeled in the art genre fantastic art. Many of Wallin's paintings have won signal honors at the Chicago Art Institute, where he was a student for four years. He has won several prizes. There are inspirations of biblical figure paintings in the oil paintings "Gethsemane" (1931), "Spirit of Allegheny Mountains", "Nymphs beside pool", "Nude on beach", " Garden of Eden", " Sorrows before Paradise" and "Heaven and Hell" and of his mythological figure paintings from the greek mythology in "Siren" (1934). Wallin executed many figurative art works and landscape art works in a quasi-symbolist style.

== Exhibitions, membership and prices ==
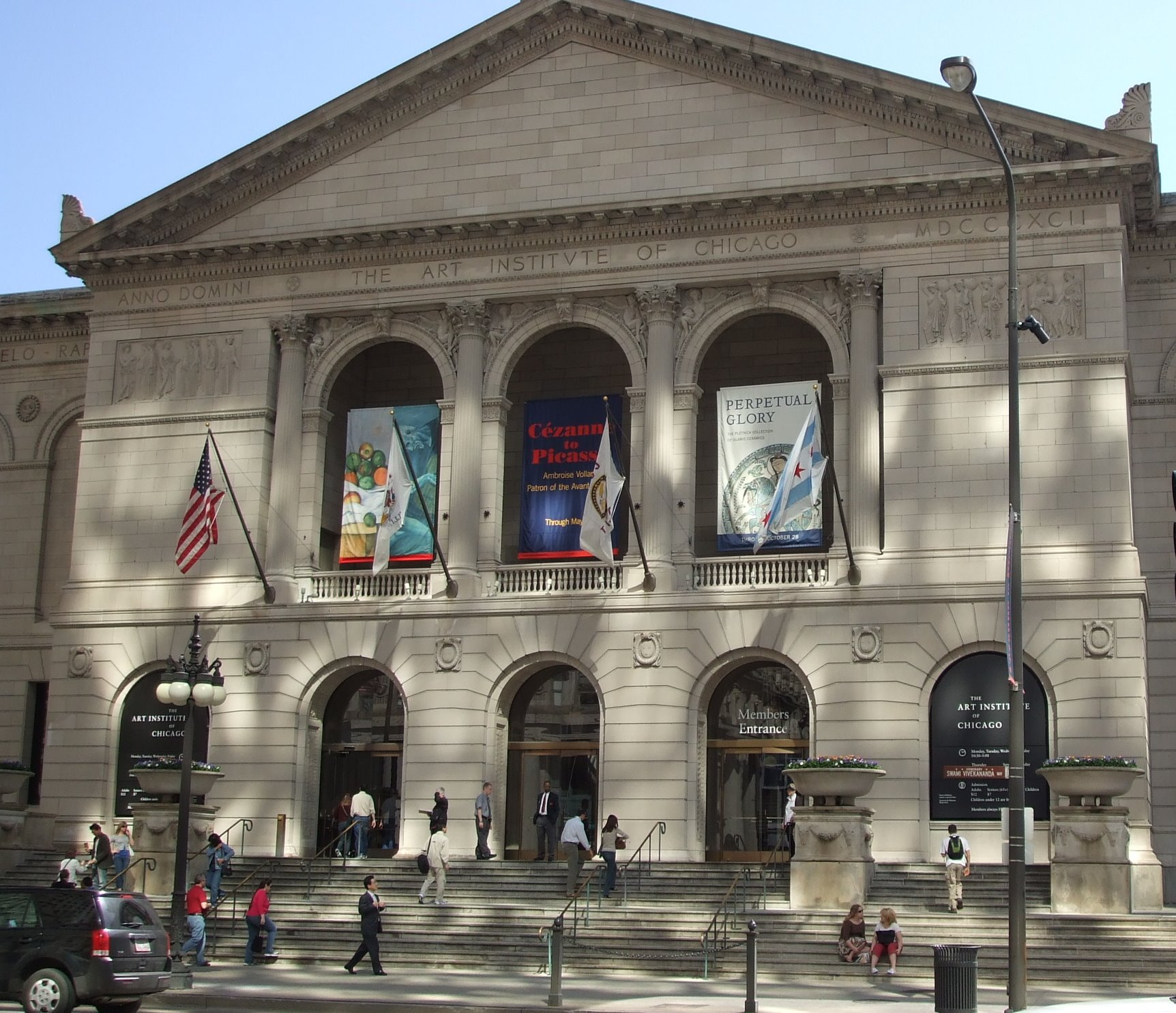
Art Institute of Chicago, main entrance.

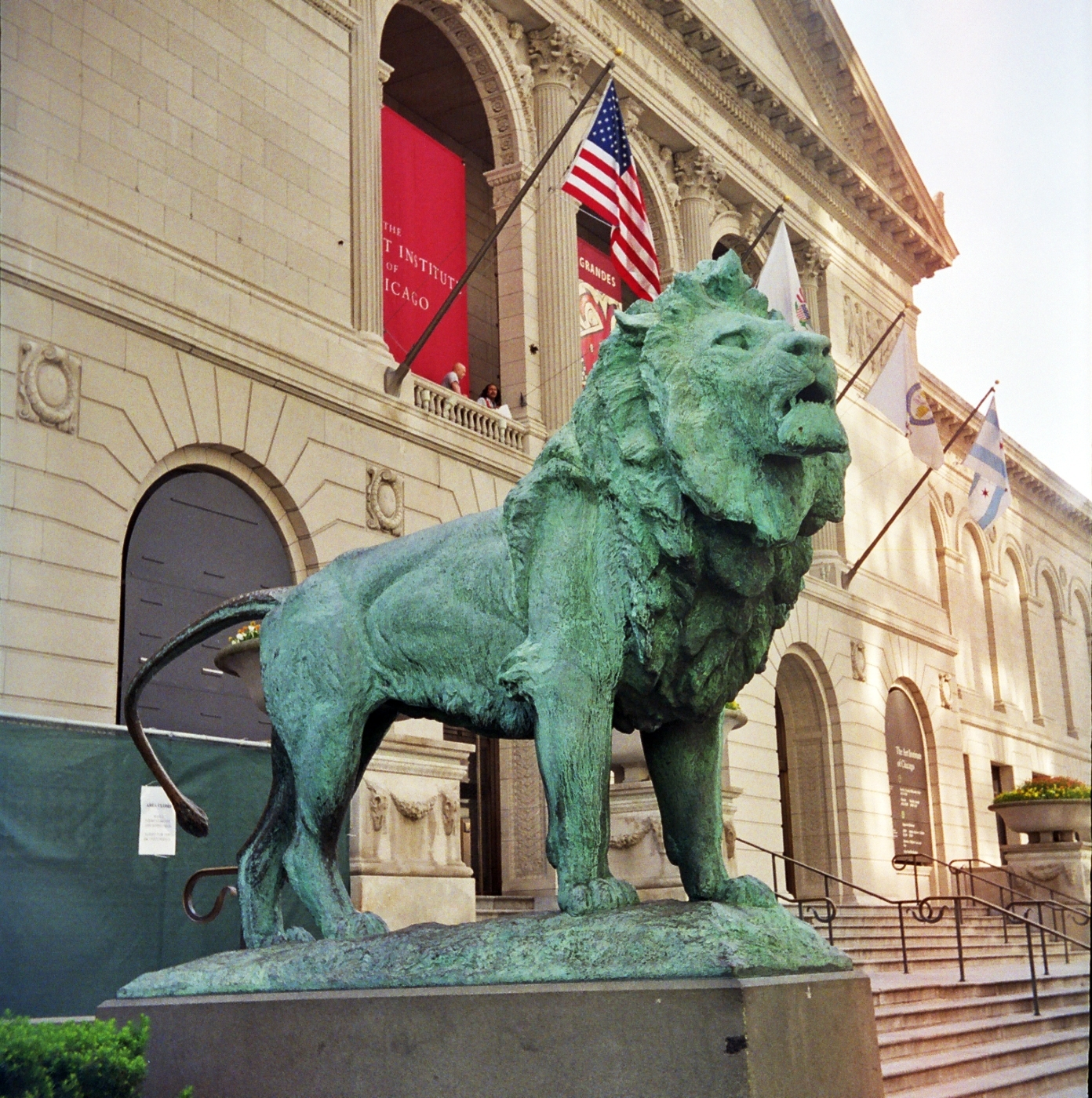
The Art Institute of Chicago Building in Chicago, Illinois. The two bronze lions by the American sculptor Edward Kemeys mark the entrance to the building.

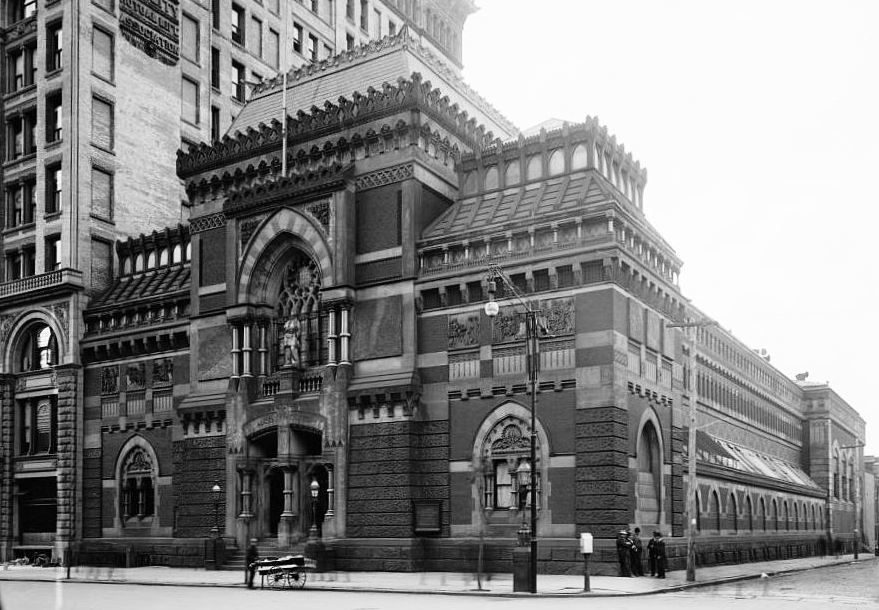
Pennsylvania Academy of Fine Arts, Philadelphia, Pennsylvania. This is a photograph from the year 1900.

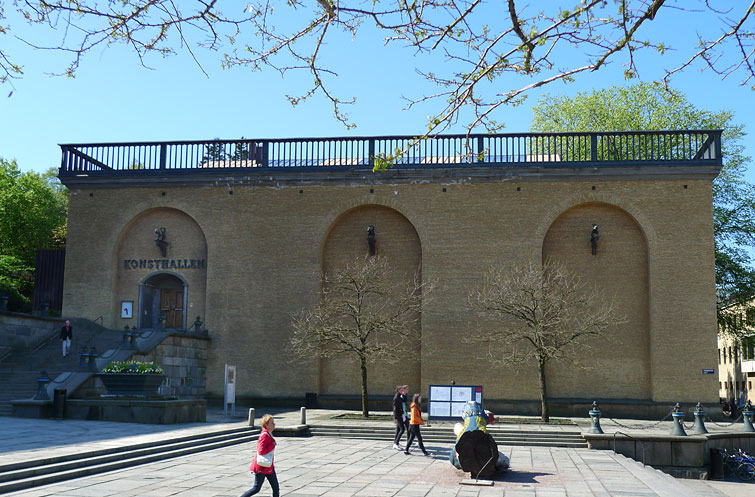
Göteborgs Konsthall in Gothenburg in Sweden was built as an art exhibition hall for the jubilee fair of Gothenburg in 1923, the Gothenburg Exhibition (1923). It is placed in a classicistic building from 1923 at Götaplatsen in the center of the city.

Exhibitions from early 1910s to middle 1960s

- Exhibitions by Swedish-American artists at the Swedish Club of Chicago in Chicago. Wallin exhibited during the years 1913–1964.
- Art Institute of Chicago in Chicago. Wallin entered the national shows in many annual exhibitions of the Art Institute of Chicago (AIC), for instance in "American Painters of Swedish Descent 1920, Exhibiting under the auspices of The Art Institute of Chicago, November 16–30, 1920", with the oil painting "Evening", number 99 in the catalog.
- Pennsylvania Academy of the Fine Arts in Philadelphia, Pennsylvania.
- School of the Art Institute of Chicago, Chicago, Illinois, Student (SAIC).
- Swedish-American Exhibition in Stockholm, Sweden, 1920.
- Swedish-American Exhibition, University of St. Thomas, Saint Paul, Minnesota.
- Swedish-American Exhibition in Gothenburg Jubilee of 1923, Sweden, May 8 – September 30, 1923, in Göteborgs Konsthall, built for the jubilee fair of Gothenburg 300 Years in 1923.
- An Exhibition of Religious Art by Artists of Chicago and Environs. Carl E. Wallin participated in the exhibition with his oil painting, "Gethsemane", March 24 - April 15, 1931, at The Renaissance Society at the University of Chicago, Exhibitions.

Membership

Carl E. Wallin was a member of the following associations: Swedish-American Art Association, Chicago Galleries Association, Chicago, All-Illinois Society of Fine Art, Chicago and The Swedish Club of Chicago.

Prices

He won several prices and he also received many awards and honors at the Swedish-American exhibitions. Carl E. Wallin exhibited in Sweden at the 1920 Swedish-American touring exhibition in Stockholm. It was a touring exhibition with the 100 best works, which was completed during the last 10 years of Swedish-American artists and the exhibition was opened in Stockholm on June 6, 1920. "At an art exhibition at the Swedish club's building in Chicago the painter Carl E. Wallin was awarded first prize for an oil painting, and which amount came to $100 and had been donated by the State Bank of Chicago. The price awarded work was "Evening Fantasy" and it had been brought up as number 107 in the catalog for the exhibition", according to a Chicago newspaper in the 1920s.

Collection of Riksföreningen Sverigekontakt

Sweden maintained an almost maternal relationship to its emigrant artists during the period of heaviest emigration to America, 1880–1920. The emigrant artists were included in dictionaries on equal footing with those artists who remained in Sweden. A number of paintings in the collection of Riksföreningen Sverigekontakt appear to have come from the 1929 exhibition of "Swedish-American Artists Given Under the Auspices of the Swedish American Art Association" at Illinois Women's Athletic club, March 10–17, 1929. Although the catalog does not give measurement, several titles correlate with the collection in Gothenburg. For example, Carl. E. Wallin's painting "Icebound", listed in the 1929 catalog for the Chicago exhibition, could possibly be the collection's painting "Fjällets Själ", ("Mountain Face"), a winter mountainous landscape in which a nude painted in shades of white and grey, is encased in snow on the face of the steep mountain peak. Wallin's painting from the 1928 exhibition, "Fantasy in Frost" has a title that also correlates with the subject matter of the work in the collection. His mystical landscapes were shown in several Swedish-American art exhibitions during the 1920s and his work is in the collection of Riksföreningen Sverigekontakt.

=== Exhibitions at The Swedish Club of Chicago ===
Carl E. Wallin exhibited at the Exhibitions by Swedish-American artists at the Swedish Club of Chicago during the years 1913–1964 with the following oil paintings. The list is compiled from the catalogs in the collection of The Swedish Club of Chicago. The exhibition year is in between the brackets. "Portrait of Carl Wallin" (1913) (this is a self-portrait), "Portrait of Mrs. Nickelson" (1913), "Sunlight" (1913), "Winter Day" (1916), "Mrs. Wallin – Portrait" (1917), "A Study" (1918), "Martha" (1918), "Just After Sunset" (1919), "Violet" (1919), "Bernhardina" (1924), "Evening" (1924), "Sunset" (1924), "Aged" (1925), "Evening Fantasy"(1925) (the oilpainting "Evening Fantasy" won first prize at the exhibition in Chicago, exhibited in 1925), "Night Fantasy" (1925), "Summernight in Sweden" (1925), "Dreams" (1926), "Earthbound" (1926), "Summer" (1926), "Cloud Fantasy" (1937) (Compare: "Evening Fantasy", exhibited in 1925 and "Frost Fantasy", exhibited in 1941 and 1946), "Frost Maidens at Work" (1947), "Frost Maidens at Work" (1941, again), "Snowbound" (1941), "Frost Fantasy" (1946), "River in Winter" (1947), "Snow and Ice" (1948), "Winter" (1949–1950) (the original is now in the ownership of the city of Gothenburg), "Earth Bound" (1951), "Frost" (1955), "Hilma" (1957), "Fantasy" (1959), "Ice Grotto", (1961), "Mountain Genius", (1964) The oil painting "Mountain Genius" (1931) is now represented in: Utlandssvenska museet in Gothenburg. Some other of Wallin's paintings, not exhibited, were "Winter scene with creek and distant mountains" and "Lonely Rower".

== Represented ==
Carl E. Wallin is represented in Utlandssvenska museet in Gothenburg, "Mountain Genius" (1931), Exhibited in the Exhibitions by Swedish-American Artists at the Swedish Club of Chicago in 1964, and in the collections of Riksföreningen Sverigekontakt (earlier Riksföreningen för svenskhetens bevarande i utlandet), with the oilpainting "Mountain's Soul" (1928).

== Sources ==
- "Svenskt Konstnärslexikon", (Who is who in Swedish art), Volyme 5, page 577, Allhems Förlag AB, Malmö, 1967, author Otto Robert Landelius. Swedish artist's lexicon is an anthology of Swedish artists and art history that was published in five volumes of Allhems Förlag AB, Malmö, 1952–1967.
- Carl E. Wallin in Konstnärslexikonett Amanda.
- Svenska Konstnärer, Biografisk handbok, VäBo Förlag, Vänersborg, 1993, page 549.
- Carl Efraim Wallin in Vem är det, Svensk biografisk handbok 1933, page 884..
- National Library of Sweden (Kungliga biblioteket) in Stockholm, accession number Acc2008/24, under Brev SE S-HS Acc2008/24:1, SE S-HS Acc2008/24 The Archive of the Family Wallin.
- Carl E. Wallin in Mary T. Swanson papers, 1970–2000, Box 3, Number 26, Augustana University, Mary T. Swanson papers, 1970-2000.

== Other sources ==
- Carl E. Wallin listed in Swedish-American Archives of Greater Chicago, Manuscript Collection #35, 91 pages. Exhibitions by Swedish-American Artists at the Swedish Club of Chicago, 1911–1982. Wallin listed in the pages 3–91. This list is compiled from the Northpark University, Chicago.Carl E. Wallin in Ebookpedia
- Lists compiled from catalog in collection. In 1949–1950 Carl E. Wallin exhibited his oilpainting "Winter" at the Exhibitions by Swedish-American artists at the Swedish Club of Chicago.
- Carl E. Wallin was a member of the Swedish Club of Chicago and he regularly exhibited at the Exhibitions by Swedish-American Artists at the Swedish Club of Chicago, here listed from 1911 to 1982 by Swedish-American Artists of Greater Chicago Manuscript Collection #35. Exhibitions by Swedish-American Artists at the Swedish Club of Chicago, 1911-1982, Manuscript Collection #35.
- Carl E. Wallin listed in "American Painters of Swedish Descent, Exhibiting under the auspices of The Art Institute of Chicago, November 16–30, 1920", with the oilpainting "Evening", number 99 in the catalog. American Painters of Swedish Descent
- Carl E. Wallin is listed in Illinois Historical Art Project, List of Illinois Artists.Carl E. Wallin in Illinois Historical Art Project
- Carl E. Wallin on page 15. A Tangled Web; Swedish Immigrant Artists' Patronage Systems, 1880–1940, Mary Swanson, 2004. Swedish Immigrant Artists' Patronage Systems
- Exhibitions by Swedish-American artists at the Swedish Club of Chicago (Svenska klubben i Chicago). A portrait of Mr. Carl Wallin, "Carl Wallin" by the Swedish-American artist Martin Lundgren (born 1871 in Sweden) in the exhibition of 1913. Martin Lundgren on page 9, A Tangled Web; Swedish Immigrant Artists' Patronage Systems, 1880–1940, Mary Swanson, 2004. Swedish Immigrant Artists' Patronage Systems
- Carl E. Wallin, "Winter landscape", Oil on Board, signed lower left, 22"x30" in Jackson's Auction in November 2002.
- Carl E. Wallin, "Colorado winter", 1945, Signed Carl E. Wallin, Oil on Canvas, 38 x 48 in. / 96.5 x 121.9 cm in Artnet. Sale Of Treadway/Toomey: Sunday, May 23, 1999, Lot 481, 20th-century auction: art and design.
- Carl E. Wallin, "Siren, 1934, Signed Carl E. Wallin, Oil on Board, 22 x 16 in. / 55.9 x 40.6 cm, in Artnet. Sale Of Teadway/Toomey: Sunday, September 7, 2003, Lot 674, 20th-century auction: art and design.
- Carl E. Wallin in Auction Price Results, Invaluable, Catalog, Search Lots

== Other links ==
- Collections in The Art Institute of Chicago. Collections in The Art Institute of Chicago
- Exhibition History of The Art Institute of Chicago. Exhibition History of The Art Institute of Chicago.
- A Tangled Web:Swedish Immigrant Artists Patronage Systems, 1880–1940, By Mary Towley Swanson, PhD, Mary Towley Swanson, 2004, Annotated Table of Contents, File 6: Diverse American Systems of Patronage Provide Broad Support (pdf-file). Swedish Immigrant Artists Patronage Systems, File 6
- A Tangled Web:Swedish Immigrant Artists Patronage Systems, 1880–1940, By Mary Towley Swanson, PhD, Mary Towley Swanson, 2004, Annotated Table of Contents, File 7: Swedish Patronage Networks Encourage Artists Careers and Ethnic Collections (pdf-file). Swedish Immigrant Artists Patronage Systems, File 7
- Appendix C: Swedish American Artists Index (Biographies of Swedish-American artists) (pdf-file). Swedish American Artists Index
