= Bianca Wallin =

Swedish artist (1909–2006)

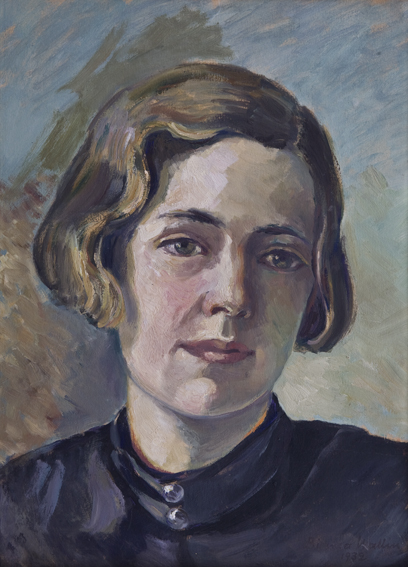
Self-portrait (1932)

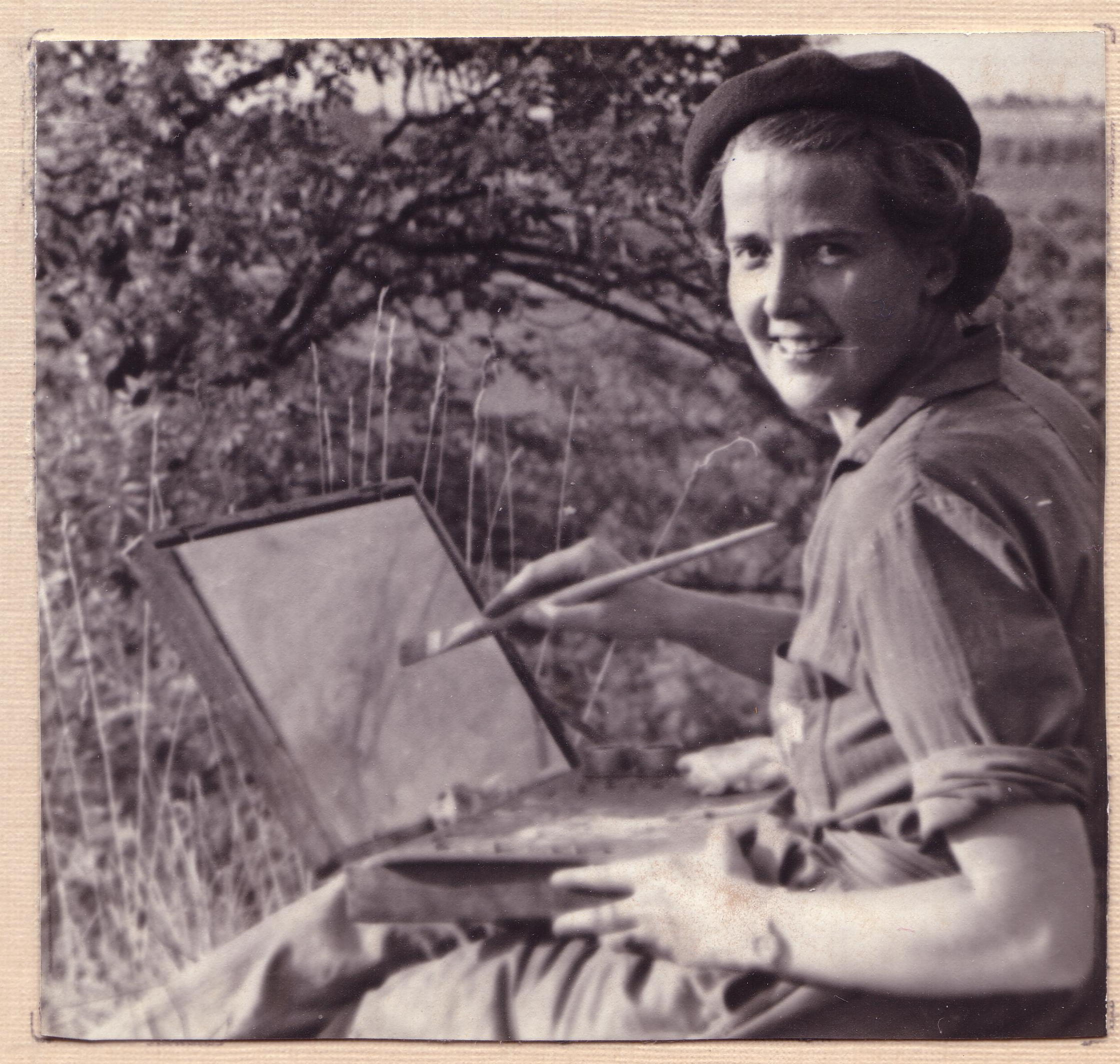
Bianca Wallin with her paintbox (1936)

Bianca Wallin (1 October 1909 in Rome – 5 January 2006 in Stockholm), was a Swedish artist.

== Biography ==
Bianca Wallin grew up in Stockholm, Sweden. She was the daughter of the Swedish artist David Wallin (1876–1957) and an artist Elin Lundberg Wallin (1884–1969), Stockholm. Her father got a scholarship, so the family lived in Rome in Italy and in Paris in France for a couple of years and moved back to Stockholm in 1913. From that time on Stockholm became her home city. Her brother was the artist Sigurd Wallin (1916–1999) and her uncle was the artist Carl E. Wallin (1879–1968). Her education was influenced by her father's work as an artist and already as a child she learned how to draw. As a daughter in this artistic family Bianca Wallin also early showed her own artistic talents, and she early knew that she wanted to become an artist. In 1935 Bianca Wallin married Gábor Kornél Tolnai (1902–1982), a Hungarian Diploma Engineer from Budapest. They settled down in Bromma, a borough in the western part of Stockholm, and had three daughters, Eva (born 1939), Monika (born 1942) and Hillevi (born 1944).

== Studies ==
After High School Exam in 1929 at Nya Elementarskolan for girls – Ahlströmska skolan at Kommendörsgatan 31 in Stockholm she wanted to become an artist. Bianca Wallin began to study for one year, in 1929–1930, at Edward Berggren and Gottfrid Larsson's Artist School in Stockholm to learn figure painting and drawing. The artist school was situated at Kungsgatan 28 in Stockholm. As teachers at the school Edward Berggren instructed in painting, Gottfrid Larsson in sculpture and Akke Kumlien in materials science.

After the year at the preparatory art school she studied for five years, 1930–1935, at the Swedish Royal Academy of Fine Arts in Stockholm, Sweden, and there she received a genuine art education. Among the teachers at the Academy of Fine Arts were such famous artists as Isaac Grünewald and Wilhelm Smith in figure drawing and Albert Engström in drawing. During the years 1932–1934, her teacher at the etching school was Emil Johansson-Thor, a painter and graphic artist.

== Oilpaintings ==
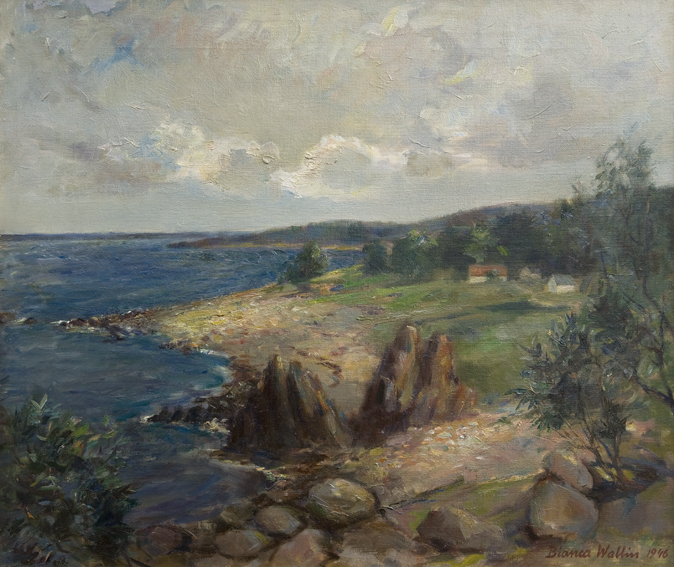
Coastal landscape with rocks in Arild (1946)

"Travelling is a nice part of life", she said. Bianca Wallin liked to travel, because it gave her inspiration, change and a new ability to create. To get motives to paint she travelled a lot both in the north and south of Sweden, Scandinavia and other countries in Europe. She painted motifs from Germany, Hungary, France, the Netherlands, Denmark and Norway. As an artist Bianca Wallin mainly painted in oil, but she was also a drawer and graphic artist. She became very skilful to express what she saw. Her oil paintings were very realistic. Her works included landscapes, figure compositions, still-life pictures, flowers and portraits. She painted subjects from the coast of Scania ("Skåne") in the south of Sweden, the Swedish Alps in the north of Sweden and the Archipelago.

== Exhibitions and portraits ==
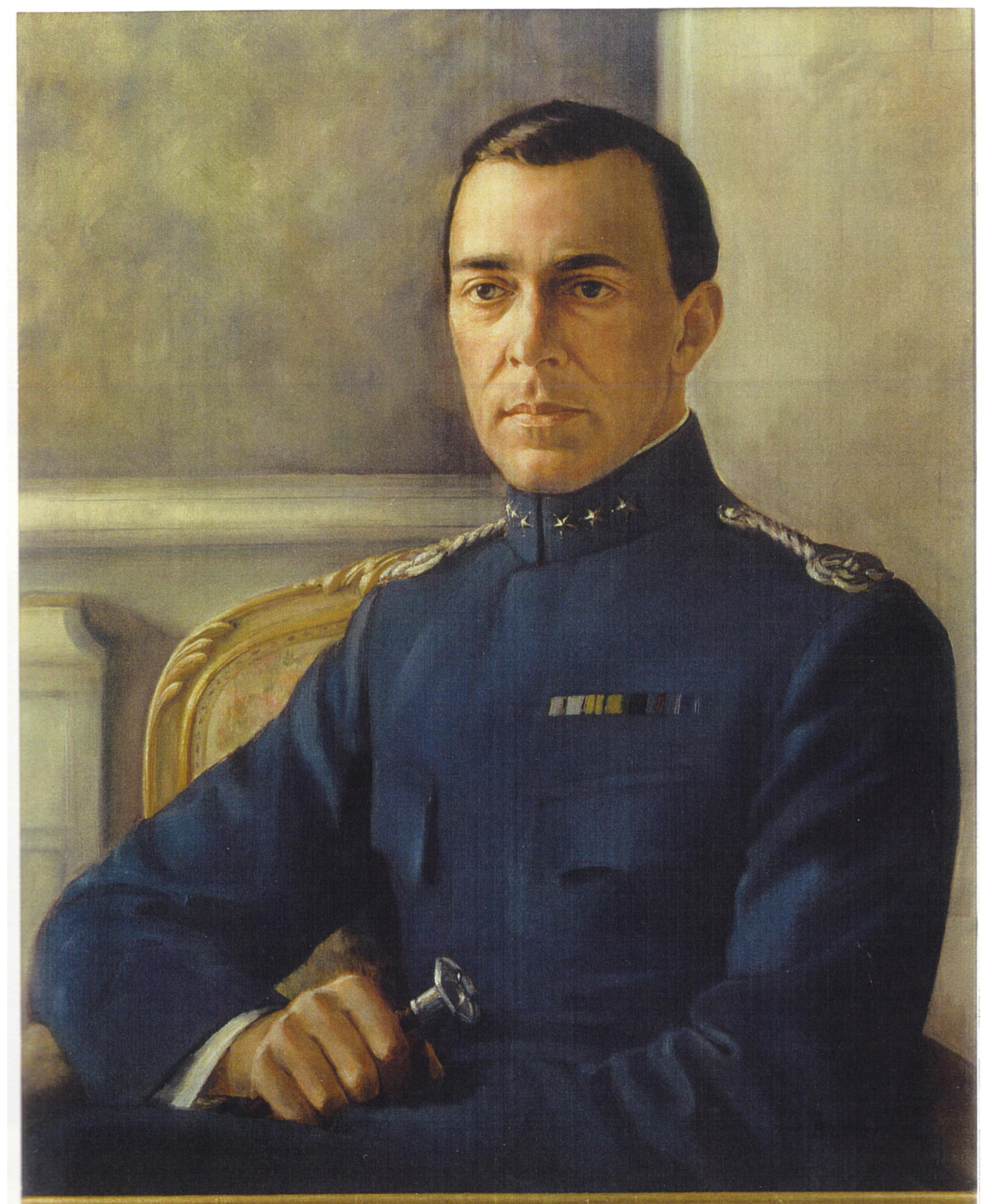
Prince Gustaf Adolf of Sweden (1939)

She also arranged a lot of exhibitions of her own paintings, especially in Stockholm. After that she gained a good reputation and her talents in oil painting made her a name for herself, and she had a successful career. A number of well off people in Stockholm and other cities had commissioned portraits from her. Her skill as a portrait painter was also the reason why she was commissioned to paint a portrait of among others the Swedish Prince Gustaf Adolf in 1939. After some articles in the newspapers, she got the nickname "The Prince's Painter". Both the portrait in oil and a charcoal-drawing to this portrait are included in the collections of the Swedish King Carl XVI Gustaf. Some other portraits of well off people are now in different official buildings in Sweden.

Bianca Wallin painted from early 1930s to late 1990s. Even at the end of the 1990s she was productive and an active artist. She liked to paint and she had a creator's joy in painting. She had a great interest in antiquities and she liked to visit auctions. "I will never be a senior citizen", she said, because she painted for her quality in life.

== Represented ==
Bianca Wallin is, among other places, represented in Norrköping's city councillor's collection of chairmen (portrait representing town adviser Nils Sjöström, 1935), The Portrait Collection of the Sparbanken in Enköping (portrait representing managing director Claes Brunnberg, 1935), Director Hugo Hammar's Art Collection, Gothenburg (Hugo Hammar was a Swedish businessman in Gothenburg) and His Majesty the King Carl XVI Gustaf's Art Collection.

== Sources ==
- Svenskt konstnärslexikon, volume 5, page 584, Allhems Förlag AB, Malmö, 1967.
- Svenska Konstnärer, Biografisk handbok, 1993.
- Bianca Wallin in the art dictionary Konstnärslexikonett Amanda (Swedish).
- Wallinska släktarkivet, accessionsnummer ACC2008_024. Wallinska släktarkivet, Kungl. Biblioteket, Humlegården, Stockholm, ACC2008_024, Ediffah.
