= Elin Wallin =

Swedish artist (1884–1969)

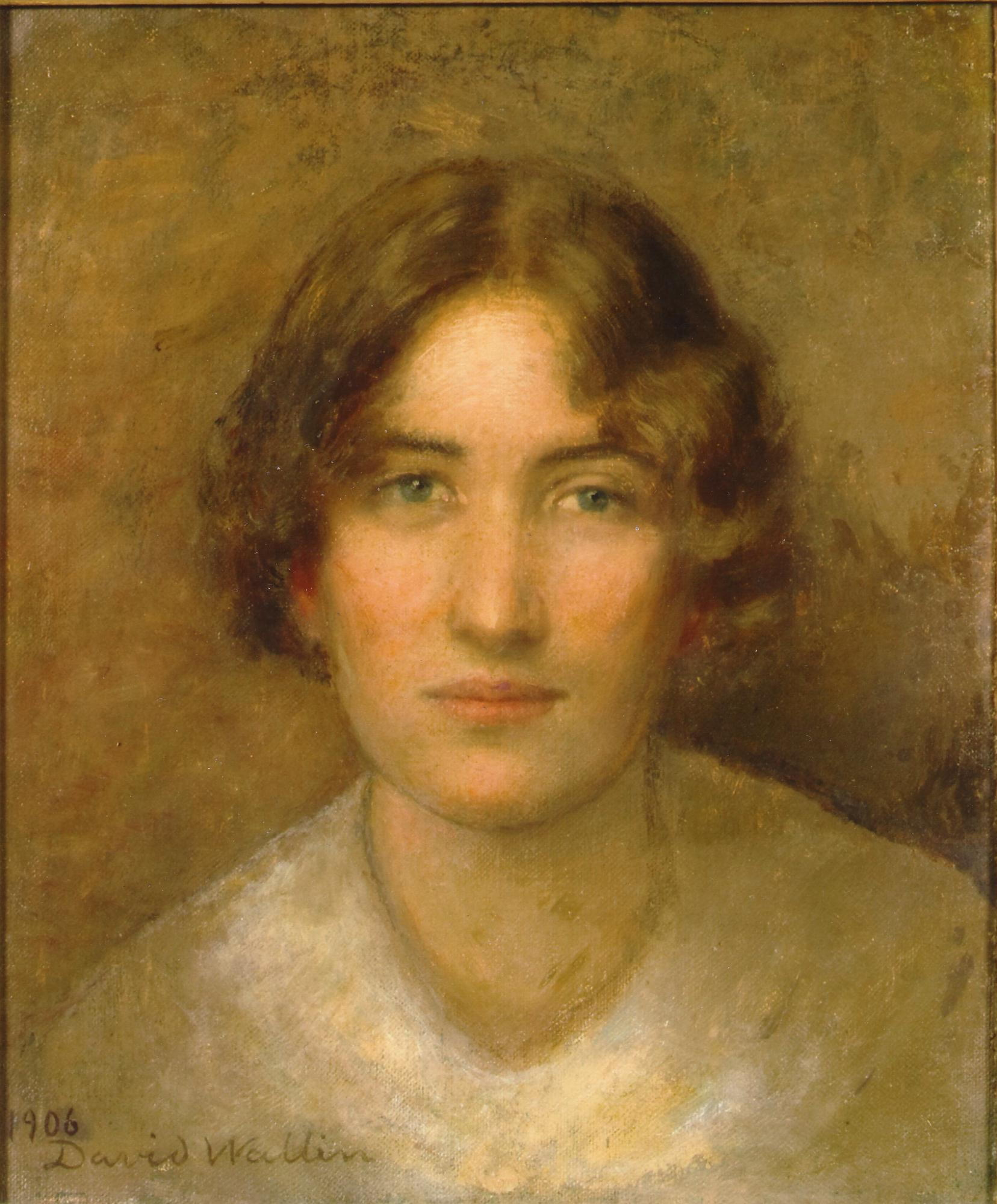
Elin Wallin in Paris in 1906. Oil painting by her husband David Wallin (1876–1957).

Elin Kristina Wallin (born 29 December 1884 in Gothenburg; died 25 March 1969 in Stockholm) was a Swedish artist. She was married to the Swedish artist David Wallin.

Elin Wallin grew up in Ekersgatan 13 in Örebro. She was the daughter of an elementary school teacher, Viktor Lundberg, and his wife Anna Lundberg, born Kalling, Örebro, and sister to the damask weaver Carl Widlund and sister to Hilda Sofia (Hild) Zetterlind-Simonsen. She was the mother of the artist Bianca Wallin (1909–2006) and of the artist Sigurd Wallin (1916–1999).

== Biography ==
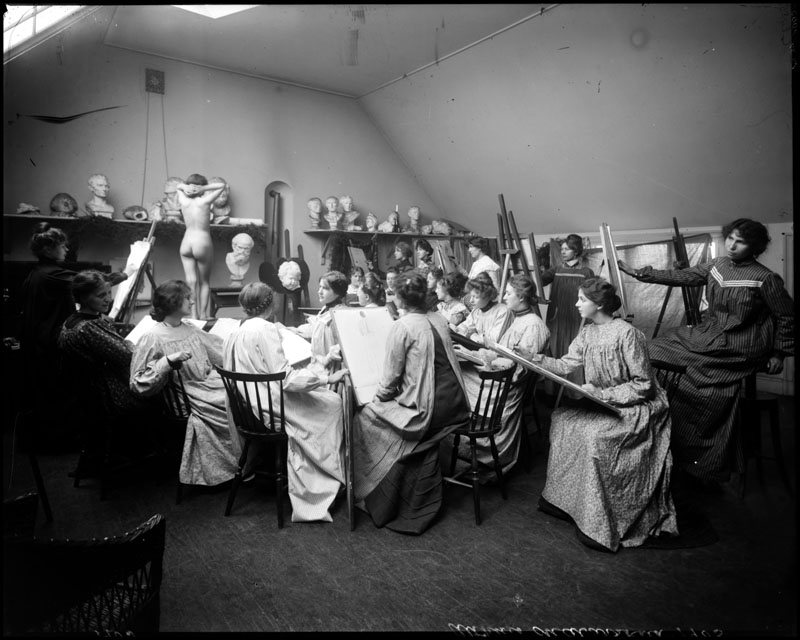
Althins målarskola (Caleb Althin's school of painting) in Stockholm. Photo from 1903. 4th from the right is Elin Wallin, born Lundberg (1884–1969).

When she had left the girls' school in Örebro Elin Wallin went to evening courses at the Technical school in Örebro in 1901 and 1902. In 1902 she passed the examination as a needlework mistress at Hulda Lundin's seminary in Stockholm and after that she continued her studies in 1902–1904 at Althins målarskola. Caleb Althin was the founder of Althin's school of painting, a private art school on Grevgatan 26 in Östermalm in Stockholm. For several decades the school played an important role in preparing young artists for the Academy of Arts. During the years 1902–1904 Wallin studied in the evenings at the University College of Arts, Crafts and Design (in Swedish simply known as Konstfack) in Stockholm. Konstfack, sometimes also called Tekniska skolan, was at that time in the block of Beridarebanan in Norrmalm, between Klara kyrka and Hötorget. During two periods, in 1905–1906 and 1910–1911, she studied at the Académie Colarossi in Paris. The Académie Colarossi accepted female students and allowed them to draw from the nude male model. Colarossi was as an alternative to the government-sanctioned École des Beaux Arts that had, in the eyes of many promising young artists at the time, become far too conservative. Together with her husband David Wallin she travelled for study to London in 1905, Paris 1905–1906 and 1910–1911, Italy 1908–1910, Germany 1905, 1906 and 1908, Denmark 1908.

Most of Elin Wallin's work was created during the years 1902–1919. She was mainly occupied with portraits in oil, pencil and tempera, as well as drawing and painting flowers and landscapes in oil, watercolor, pencil and charcoal. Wallin's art can, by sheer radiant colors display relations to David Wallin. The landscapes and portraits of her husband, one senses perhaps more reminiscent of French impressionism. Mostly, however, her paintings carries her own mark, especially the children portraits with their bright color touches. In bright memories she tries to cling to elements of their seven children, of whom she lost two in a very early age. There are pictures from a family album, with no claim to universality, but right in the humble plea to heart. Wallin has also appeared with illustrations in magazines.

== Family and personal life ==
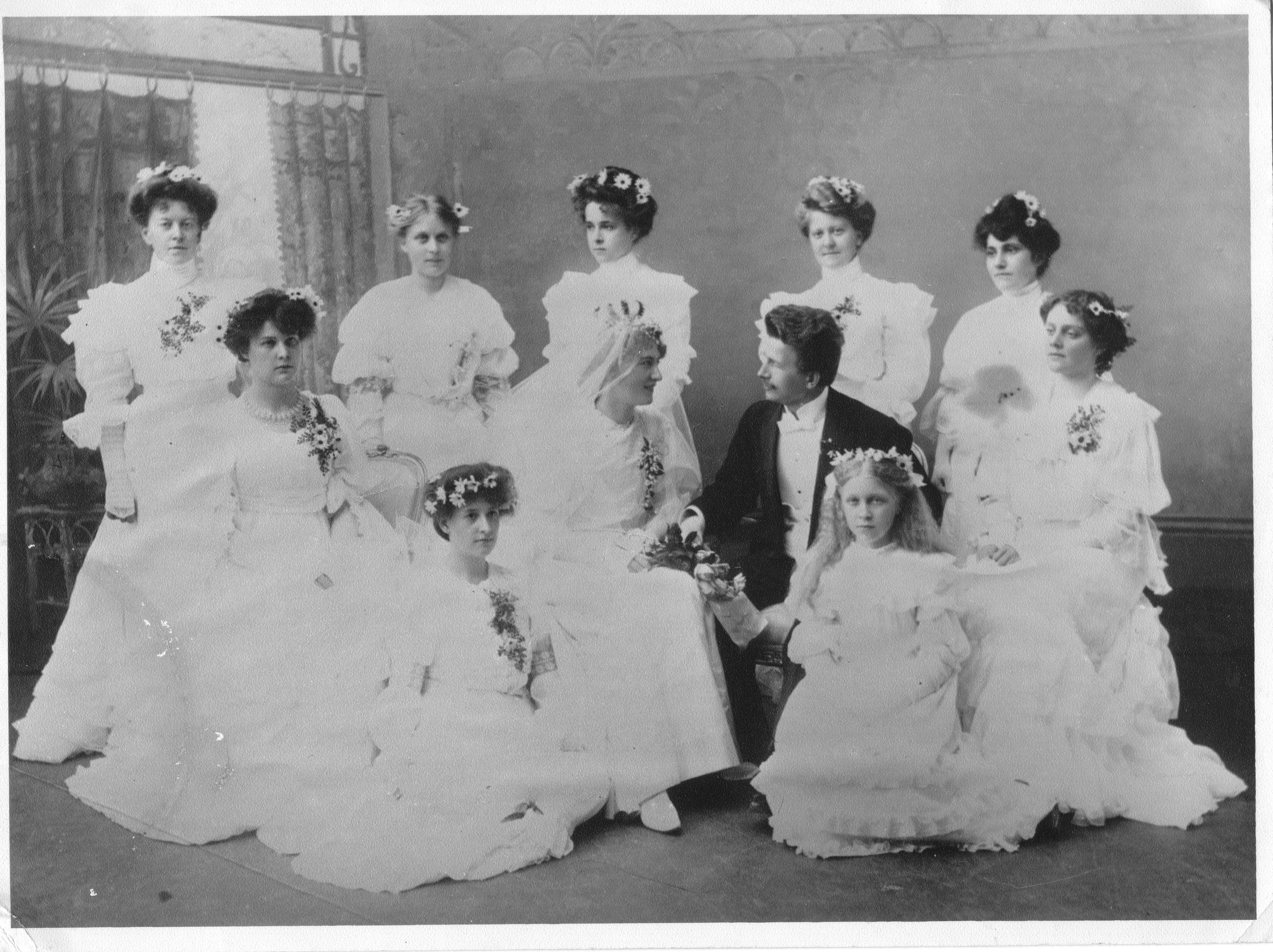
Elin and David Wallin's wedding on 14 September 1905 in Sankt Nikolai church, Örebro

Elin Wallin was only 20 years old when she married David Wallin, 29 years old, on 14 September 1905; they had been engaged since 25 March that year. It was a solemn church wedding and the ceremony took place in Sankt Nikolai church in Örebro, Elin's home town. Dinner was given at Stora hotellet, Örebro, the town's oldest hotel nearby Storbron and Örebro slott at the corner of Drottninggatan 1 and Engelbrektsgatan. The priest who married them, the dean Erik Edlund, was Elin's confirmation priest. The newly married husband David had an exhibition in Örebro in the same week as the wedding. It was one of the first exhibitions that David ever had.

After the wedding they went on honeymoon to Paris and London. David painted a couple of small paintings with Elin in the Luxembourg Gardens in Paris. The couple settled in Stockholm and Elin and David became parents of seven children, born in 1906, 1907, 1909, 1912, 1916, 1922 and 1924, five girls and two boys. The two oldest girls were born in Sweden, Helena and Hillevi. Their daughter Bianca was born in Rome in Italy in 1909. Their fourth daughter, Dagny, was born in Paris in 1912.

In 1908, David Wallin was awarded a Royal Swedish Academy of Arts travel scholarship, which was later extended for another year. The following year he received another award. The awards allowed him to live in Italy, and then in France during the period 1908–1913 with his whole family. During the years 1908–1910 the family stayed in Rome at Lehmanns boarding-house, which was owned by Mrs. Lehmann in Via Frattina. During the summers David stayed in Volterra, southwest of Florence, where there was a colony of artists. During the years 1910–1913 the family stayed in Paris at 43 Rue de l’Abbé Grégoire in Montparnasse-Luxembourg. During their time in Paris the family Wallin got to know some other Swedish artists including the sculptor Gottfrid Larsson (1875–1936) with wife Karen Larsson (born Waaler), who were staying in Paris in 1908–1913, and the artist and photographer Erik Tryggelin (1879–1962).

In the autumn 1913 the family moved back to Sweden and Stockholm. When the fifth child came it was finally a boy, Sigurd, and happiness seemed complete. But, there was heavy grief of the family, two girls, Hillevi and Dagny, died in a drowning accident in the summer of 1919. Of course the family was affected much by this. Elin did not continue to paint. David painted many melancholy motifs of mother and child, deeply influenced by his grief. After a few years the family was extended again with two children, a girl and a boy.

From 1913, the family lived in Hjärnegatan 10 in Kungsholmen, and in 1928 the family could move into a large apartment in Östermalm, Karlavägen 43, overlooking Humlegården. Now David was close to his artist work-rooms, located just across the Humlegården. The atelier, his studio with workroom, was on the upper top floor and had sloping roof windows on Humlegårdsgatan 23 in Stockholm with a view over the (National Library of Sweden), Kungliga biblioteket, KB. The atelier, he had it already in autumn of 1904, was rented out during the years when the family lived in Rome and Paris, and it was his workplace for over 50 years. Elin Wallin was a great support for her husband with his work as an artist and she was a very energetic woman.

== Sources ==
- Svenskt konstnärslexikon, (Who is who in Swedish art), Volume 5, page 580, Allhems Förlag AB, Malmö, 1967, author Ingrid Martelius, a Swedish art- and culture historian.
- Svenskt konstnärslexikon, (Who is who in Swedish art), Volume 5, pages 577–579, Allhems Förlag AB, Malmö, 1967, author Viggo Loos (1895–1974), a Swedish newspaper editor, art publicist and Doctor of Philosophy in Art History.
- Wallinska släktarkivet (Wallin family archive), Kungl. Biblioteket (National Library of Sweden), Humlegården, Stockholm, Accession Number ACC2008_024, Ediffah. Accession Number ACC2008_024.
- Wallinska släktarkivet, tillägg (fotografier) (Wallin family archive, addition (photographies)), Kungl. Biblioteket,(National Library of Sweden), Humlegården, Stockholm, ACC2008_137, Ediffah. Accession Number ACC2008_137.
- David Wallins papper rörande hans konstnärliga verksamhet (David Wallin's paper about his artistic work), Kungl. Biblioteket (National Library of Sweden), Humlegården, Stockholm, ACC2008_138, Ediffah. Accession Number ACC2008_138.
