= Swedish-American Art Association =

The Swedish-American Art Association was founded on February 5, 1905, by a number of Chicago artists with the goal of promoting the work of Swedish-American artists. Sculptor Carl Johan Nilsson was chosen as president. The association was incorporated under the laws of the State of Illinois in 1905.

== First exhibition ==
The Swedish-American Art Association opened its first exhibition of eighty pieces at the Anderson Art Galleries in Chicago in October 1905. The exhibition was extended from two weeks to three weeks due to its popularity.

Participants in the exhibition included the Swedish-American artists Gerda Ahlm, Arvid Nyholm and Henry Reuterdahl.

The Swedish artists Carl Larsson, Bruno Liljefors, Anders Zorn and Anshelm Schultzberg sent canvases from Sweden, and Charles Friberg sent three sculptures.

== Later exhibitions ==
Exhibits were held in later years, though not always annually.

The 1929 exhibit was held in conjunction with the Illinois Women's Athletic Club at which 136 pieces by forty-eight artists were exhibited.

The 1934 exhibit was held at the Swedish Club of Chicago. Thirty-nine artists exhibited eighty-two works in the categories of black and whites, oil paintings, sculpture, water colors and "In Memoriam."

The Swedish-American Art Association held exhibitions to at least 1936 when an exhibit was held at the Marshall Field's department store in Chicago.
