= Carl Georg August Wallin =

Swedish painter (1893–1978)

Carl Georg August Wallin (2 February 1893 in Svanshall, Jonstorp, Skåne County, Sweden – 28 July 1978 in Svanshall) was a Swedish marine painter, master mariner and visual artist. Most often he has painted mariners and coastal landscapes.

== Biography ==
Carl Wallin was born in Svanshall, a little fishing village in the western Skälderviken in Malmöhus County in northwest of Skåne County, about 25 kilometers north of Helsingborg, the nearest village to the south is Jonstorp. He grew up in an old seamen's family, his father was the sea captain Jöns Andersson and his mother was Annette Wallin. His father was captain in the barque Netten, which disappeared in the North Atlantic with men and everything in 1893, the same year he was born. In 1904, when he was 11 years old, his mother died too. He grew up with his grandmother. In 1925 he married Anna Greta Ingeborg Jönsson.

As soon as he had left school he went to sea. Wallin took his master mariner degree in 1914 and then he served shipping company Transmarin AB as an officer and commander. He got an interest to start painting in 1935. He was inspired by a steward on board the boat, which he commanded, and who painted landscapes as a hobby. He bought a box of colors and a piece of canvas by the meter and started painting.

In 1940 he left sea in order to devote his time to marine painting. Now he was marin painter full time. As a painter he was self-taught. His ambition was to render any ship technically correct and its movements in the sea and the rhythm of the waves. On the stretched canvas he sketched the ship and the rhythm of the waves with charcoal and chalk. Then he made a painting in brown and ochre.

== Artistry ==
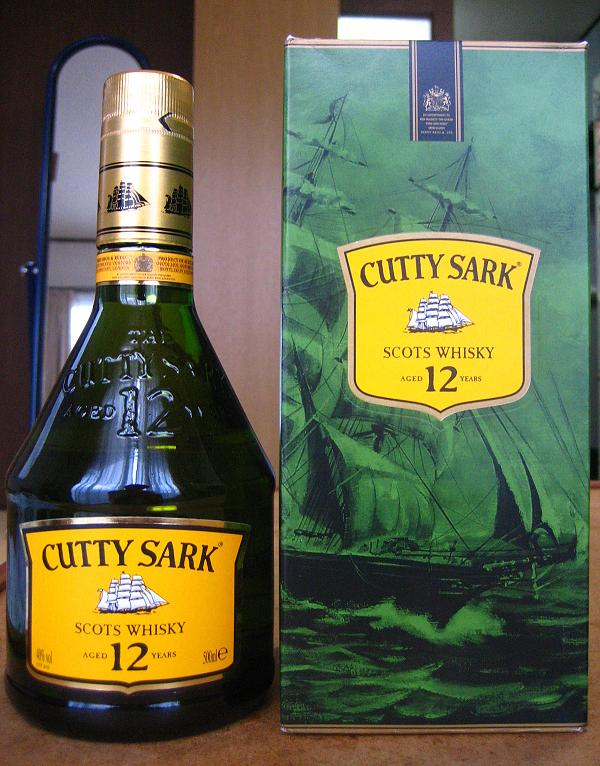
A bottle of Cutty Sark Scotch Whisky and its box with the drawing by Carl Wallin on the label.

Cutty Sark under sail

Wallin's debut was in the early 1940s, when Broström Lines announced a competition for promotional picture of the school ship Albatross. He emerged as the winner in the contest in which the curator at Sjöhistoriska Museet, Gerhard Albe, was in the jury. His breakthrough came in an exhibition in Göteborgs Handelstidning's premises in connection with the Albatross boat launch. The orders poured in from around the country. For Broström AB he made many oil paintings, about 50 pieces, some of which were reproduced by the shipping company and were delivered to the agents and employees. Shipping Company Nordstjernan AB ordered some 30 paintings by Wallin.

Carl Wallin painted some 700 ship paintings, most of them named with the names of the ships, usually full-rigged ship, but he has also painted marine compositions and coastal landscapes. Many of the great shipping companies of that time commissioned paintings of their ships by Carl Wallin. But even foreign shipping companies, seafarers associations and federations as well as private buyers commissioned paintings.

Carl Wallin's drawing of the Cutty Sark (the tea clipper built in Scotland), which since 1955, is the label on the whiskey bottles of Cutty Sark whisky, which is a Scotch blended whisky, is probably his most famous ship painting. The clipper ship Cutty Sark was one of the most famous clipper ships that sailed under Brittiska Ostindiska Kompaniet (British East India Company). In 1953 he traveled for study purposes to a lot of countries, he went to Germany, England, the Netherlands, Belgium, France, Algeria, Cyprus, Greece, Egypt, Lebanon, Syria, Turkey and Italy.

Carl Wallin was living in Svanshall, where he also had his studio. He initiated the formation of the maritime museum in Svanshall, founded in 1959 and located in the deckhouse to the S/S Ribersborg. His customers often came to visit him and gave him order. For relaxation and recreation from his painting he liked to go sailing and fishing. Many of his paintings have ended up all around the world. He was active until his final year, in 1978, when he died at age 85. Carl Georg August Wallin and his wife, Anna-Greta Ingeborg Wallin (25 October 1904 - 29 June 1984), are both buried in Jonstorp's cemetery, Farhult-Jonstorps parish in Höganäs municipality.

Carl Wallin participated in the exhibition "Kulla-art" in Höganäs, including at the 10th anniversary celebration in 1950, and he has performed separately in Malmö and Höganäs museum in 1956, in Arild in Skåne County in 1964 and in a maritime museum in Stockholm, Sjöhistoriska museet in Stockholm, in 1969. In 1983, after his death, a major exhibition in Höganäs museum was arranged.

== Sources ==
- Svenskt konstnärslexikon (Swedish), volyme 5, Allhelms förlag AB, Malmö, 1967, page 577.
- Svenska Konstnärer, Biografisk Handbok, VäBo Förlag, Vänersborg, 1993, page 549.
- Carl Georg August Wallin in Konstnärslexikonett Amanda (Swedish)
- Sture Händel & Johnny Riert, Skutemålare, (inb), 208 pages, Uppsala, J. Riert, 1996, ISBN 91-630-3793-9. Skutemålare
- Anbytarforum Marinmålare - skeppsporträtt (Swedish)
