= Vikbolandet =

Peninsula in Sweden

Coordinates: 58°31′57″N 16°40′13″E

Vikbolandet is a large peninsula east of Norrköping city in Östergötland, Sweden. The area is limited by Bråviken to the north, Slätbaken to the south and the Baltic Sea to the east. The biggest population center is Östra Husby with a population of 868, followed by Ljunga (pop 751) and Arkösund (pop 172) (Note: Småorter 2015 (XLSX) (in Swedish), Statistics Sweden, December 19, 2016. The smaller locality code of Arkösund is S1369.) (pop figures as of 2015) on the Baltic Sea coast at the far east of the peninsula.

The areas to the west (towards Norrköping city) is mostly flat farmland while the areas to the east is mostly wooded with intermixed farmland. Ferries run across Bråviken north to Kolmården and south across Slätbaken.

According to the 2006 census, the whole area had a population of 6,751.

== Famous residents ==
- Malin Baryard - Equestrian
- Andreas Vestesson - Farmer
