= Östra Husby =

- Location within Östergötland Location within Sweden
- Coordinates: 58°35′N 16°33′E
- Country: Sweden
- Province: Östergötland
- County: Östergötland County
- Municipality: Norrköping Municipality

Area
  - Total: 0.83 km^{2} (0.32 sq mi)

Population (31 December 2019)
  - Total: 904
  - Density: 955/km^{2} (2,470/sq mi)
- Time zone: UTC+1 (CET)
  - Summer (DST): UTC+2 (CEST)

Östra Husby is a Village situated in Norrköping Municipality, Östergötland County, Sweden with 904 inhabitants in 2020. Östra Husby is situated 22 kilometers east of Norrköping and 16 kilometers northeast of Söderköping, Sweden. Östra Husby is the regional centre of Vikbolandet with a supermarket, dentist, medical centre, library and a primary school. There is also a sports club (Bråvalla IK) and a theater group (Vikbolandsspelen).

== Associations ==
Bråvalla IK

Vikbolandsspelet

Bygdegård

Vikbolandets Företagsgrupp

== Images from Östra Husby ==
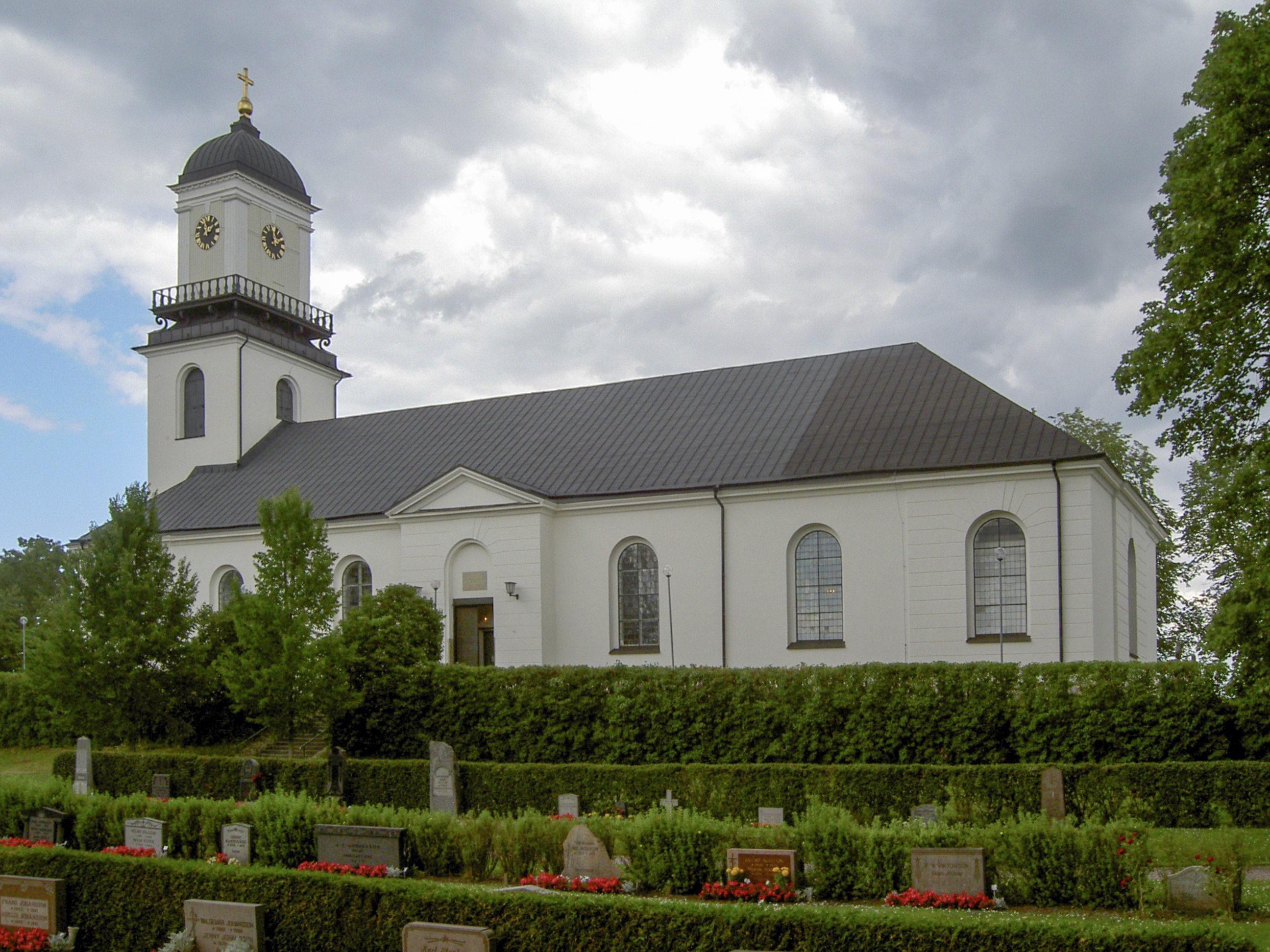
The Östra Husby Church

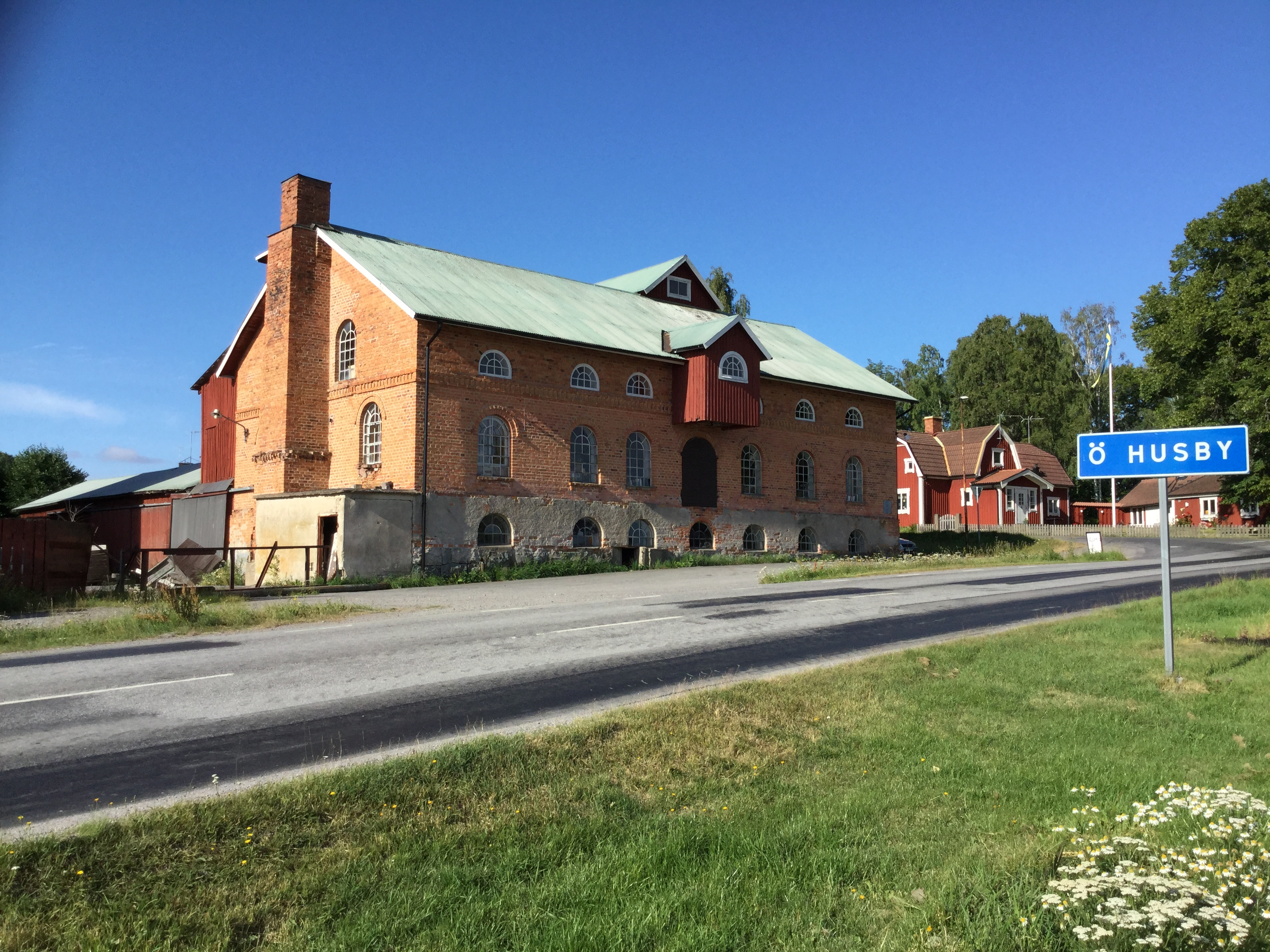
The old mill in Östra Husby

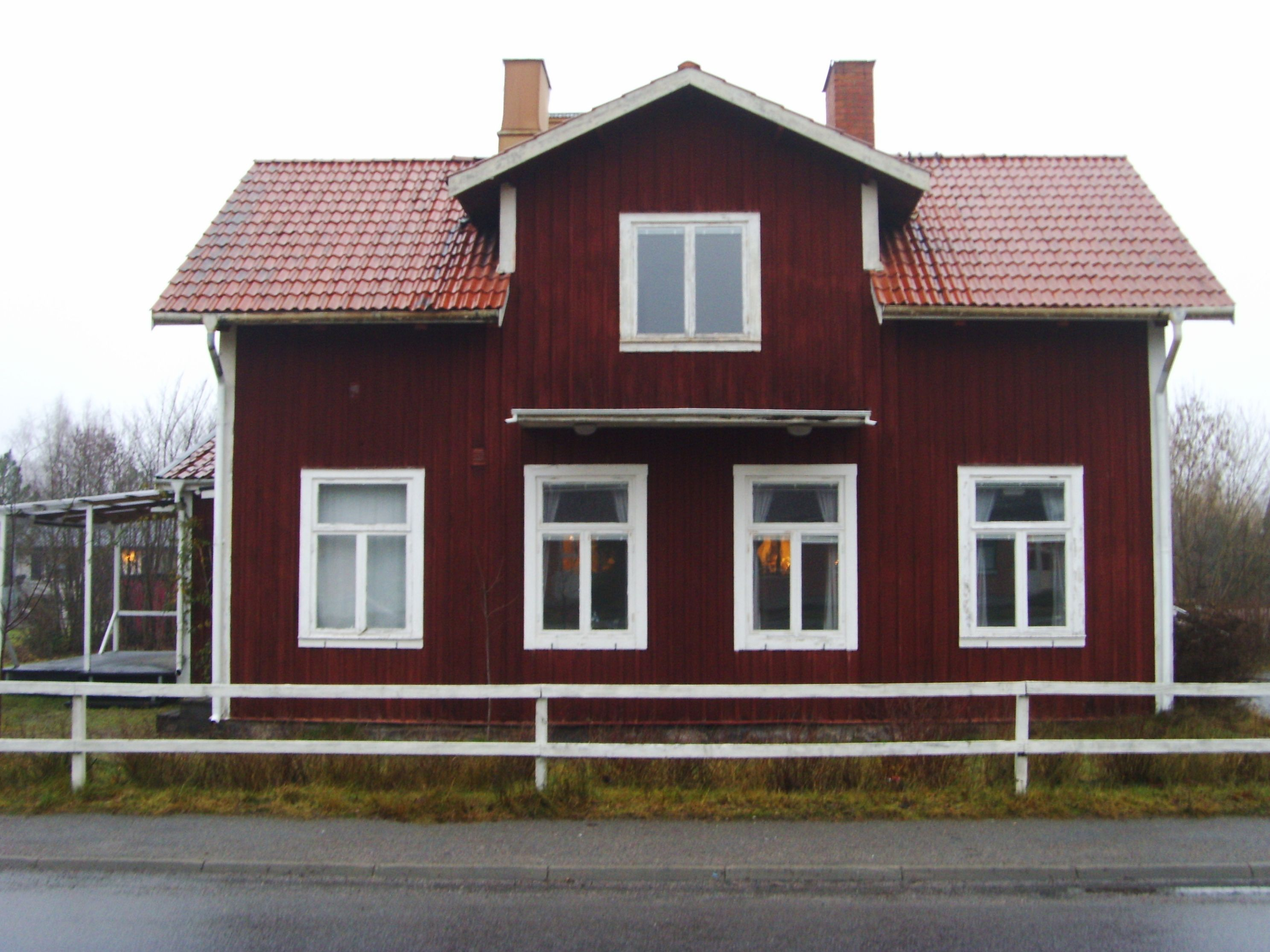
The old Train station in Östra Husby
