= Arild =

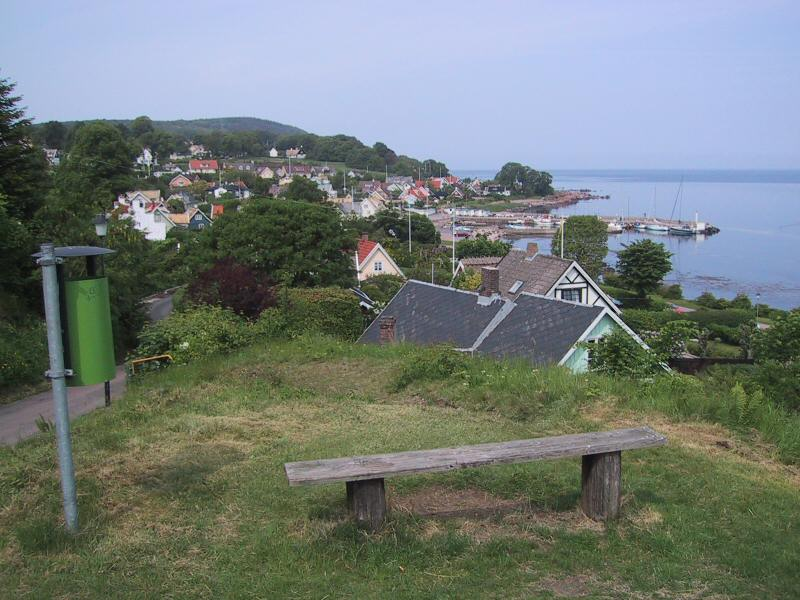

- Location of Arild Municipality in Skåne County Location of Arild Municipality in Sweden
- Coordinates: 56°16′N 12°34′E
- Country: Sweden
- Province: Skåne
- County: Skåne County
- Municipality: Höganäs Municipality

Area
  - Total: 1.45 km^{2} (0.56 sq mi)

Population (31 December 2010)
  - Total: 522
  - Density: 359/km^{2} (930/sq mi)
- Time zone: UTC+1 (CET)
  - Summer (DST): UTC+2 (CEST)
- Website: Arilds Byalag

Arild (Swedish pronunciation: [ˈɑ̂ːrɪld]) is a locality situated in Höganäs Municipality, Skåne County, Sweden with 522 inhabitants in 2010. It is located in the bay of Skälderviken in north-western Scania, approximately 30 km north of Helsingborg in Sweden. Arild belongs to Brunnby parish with its seat in Brunnby. The parish is represented in Arild by Arilds Chapel. The village was mostly concentrated around the chapel and the shoreline but has come to extend uphill towards Kullaberg, creating height differences between the various parts of the village. The coastline surrounding the village and the majority of the northern shore of the Kullen peninsula is mountainous.

== History ==
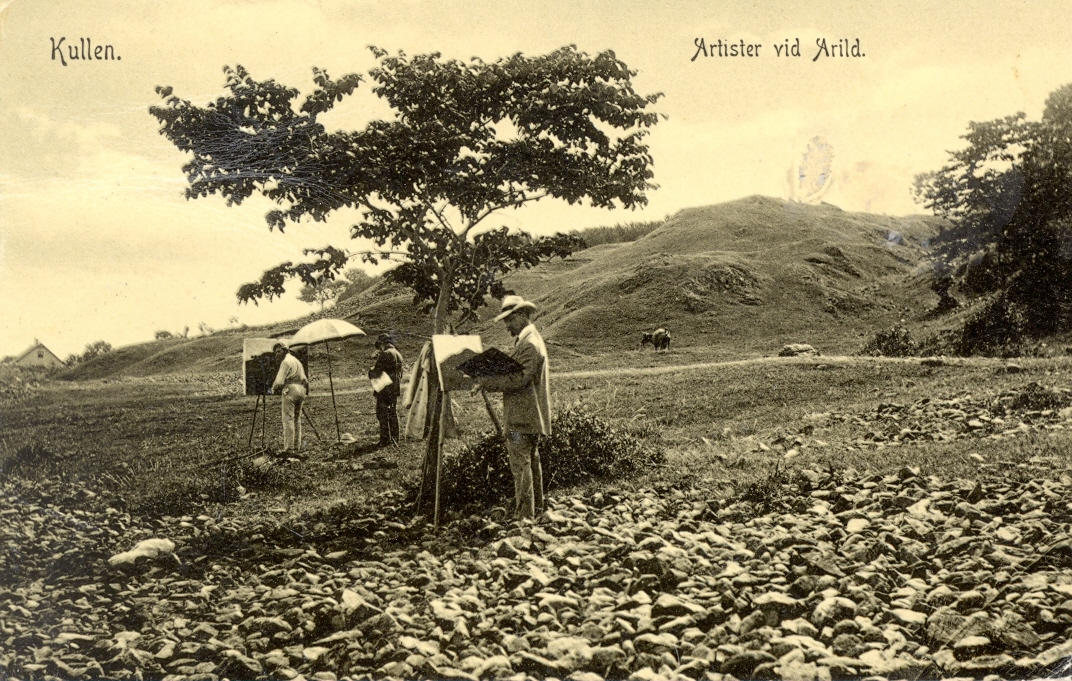
Painters on the shoreline of Arild in 1900

The Arild Legend tells the story of a woman named Inger, a widow who single-handedly bore the responsibility of her two young sons, Arild and Tore. Inger decided to marry one of her many suitors, a particularly persistent one, master David, whose intentions, unfortunately, turned out to be less than noble. Master David made sure that Inger's sons were aboard a ship that was set afire at sea in Skälderviken, thus securing an inheritance for himself and his own sons. Legend has it that Arild's body washed ashore at what is today known as Arild and that Tore's body perhaps drifted across Skälderviken to the place which is now called Torekov which is located on the Bjärre peninsula.

The evolution of the name Arild has gone through various changes since 1508 when the locality was referred to as Hellige Aruitz leye i Kuldenn. The village was also referred to as Hele Arveds Leye in 1569, Arillsläge in 1751 by Carl von Linné, Arildsläge in 1917 and finally established as Arild in 1929 when a local post office was opened in the village and a postal code had to be established.

Like Mölle, which is also located close to Kullaberg, on the Kullen peninsula, Arild has been a well known resort since the beginning of the 20th century. Amongst the first to discover Arild as a holiday resort were Europe's fashionable elite. Arild was and still is a very popular with painters and other artists.

== Arild today ==
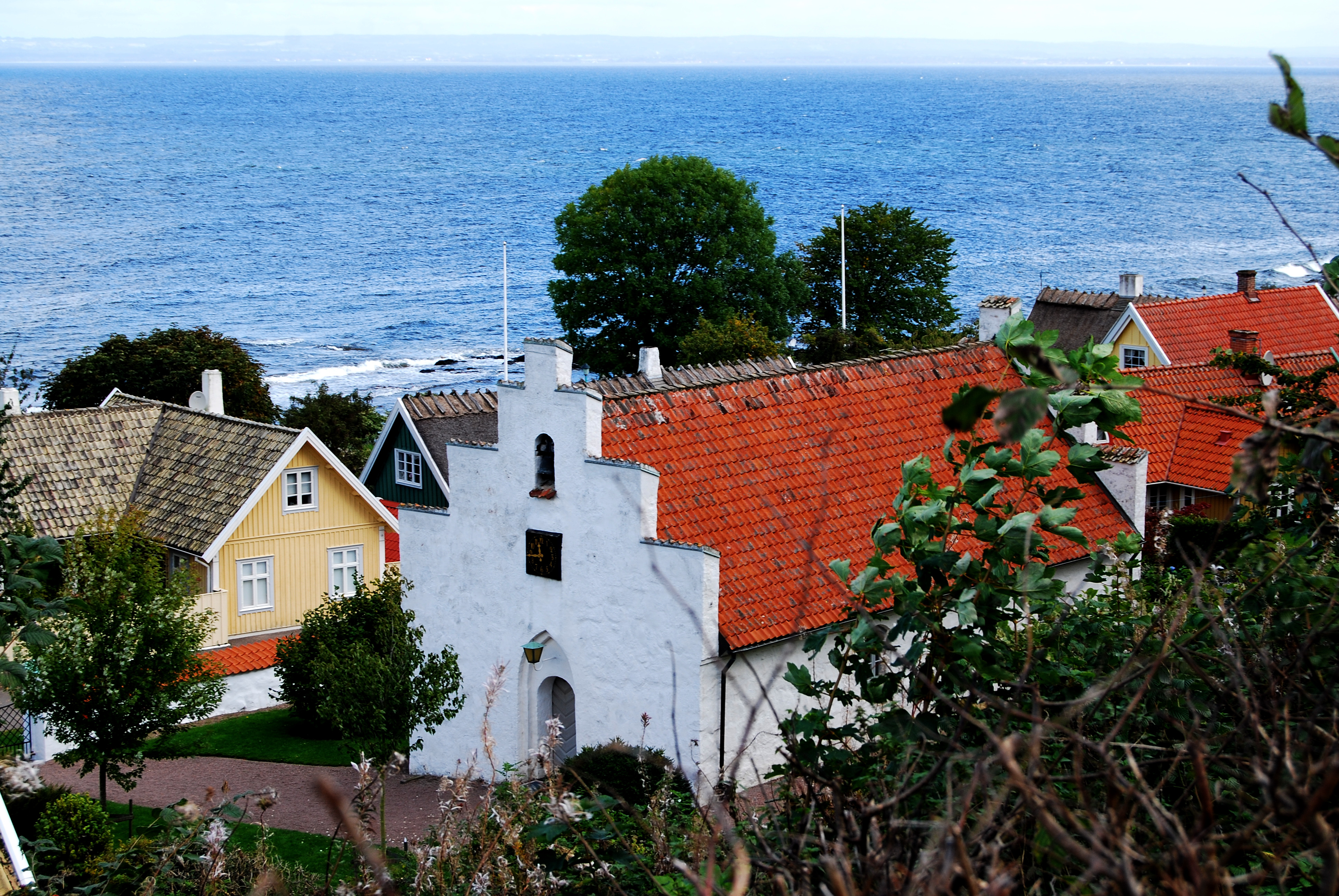
Arilds Chapel

The majority of the older architecture of Arild is located nearby to the small harbour that has been the center of the village together with the chapel since the early days. The construction of the current harbour started in 1841 and carried on with improvements until 1926. Improvements were made in 1934 and 1958 when the pier was extended and a small lighthouse was built respectively. The architecture surrounding the harbour dates back to the years when the population of Arild largely consisted of fishermen, these houses differ greatly from the rest of the village architecture in design. The majority of these houses were built around the beginning of the 20th century but some houses dates back to the 17th century and the 18th century. The local chapel Arilds Chapel is located not far from the harbour and dates back to the 15th century when it was first mentioned in a letter. The chapel was built in Sankt Arilds honour on the site of his burial according to the Arild Legend.

Several locations along the shoreline of Arild has been used as bathing locations since the early days of the village. There are more than ten locations that has been properly built for the purpose of recreational bathing and swimming. All of these locations are on the mountainous shoreline, the closest beach is located on the opposite side of the peninsula in Strandbaden. During the summer period Arild is also popular for various sporting and recreational activities such as Tennis, Golf and Sailing. Sailing takes place around the shoreline with the village harbour as its base. A Tennis court is located on the edge of the village while the Golf course if located a bit further from the village. Trekking and Hiking are also popular activities since the village is located at the foot of Kullaberg.

Two established hotels and taverns are also located in Arild, namely Rusthållargården, founded in 1892 as Hotel Arild, and Strand Hotell, founded in 1904 as Troedssons pensionat. When tourism in Arild reached its peak during the 19th century several other hotels operated in and around the village, most notably Turisthotellet Kullen, located uphill in the village.

== Population ==
Development of Arild's population
Year	Population
1960	261
1965	254
1970	232
1975	295
1980	323
1990	356
1995	625
2000	569
2005	537
2010	522

== Cultural references ==
The Danish composer Siegfried Langgaard wrote part of his works while staying in Arild; the remaining sketches of his Second Piano Concerto were worked into a new concerto, From Arild by his son, Rued Langgaard.
