= Cassazione (Sibelius) =

Orchestral composition by Jean Sibelius

- Concert piece by Jean Sibelius
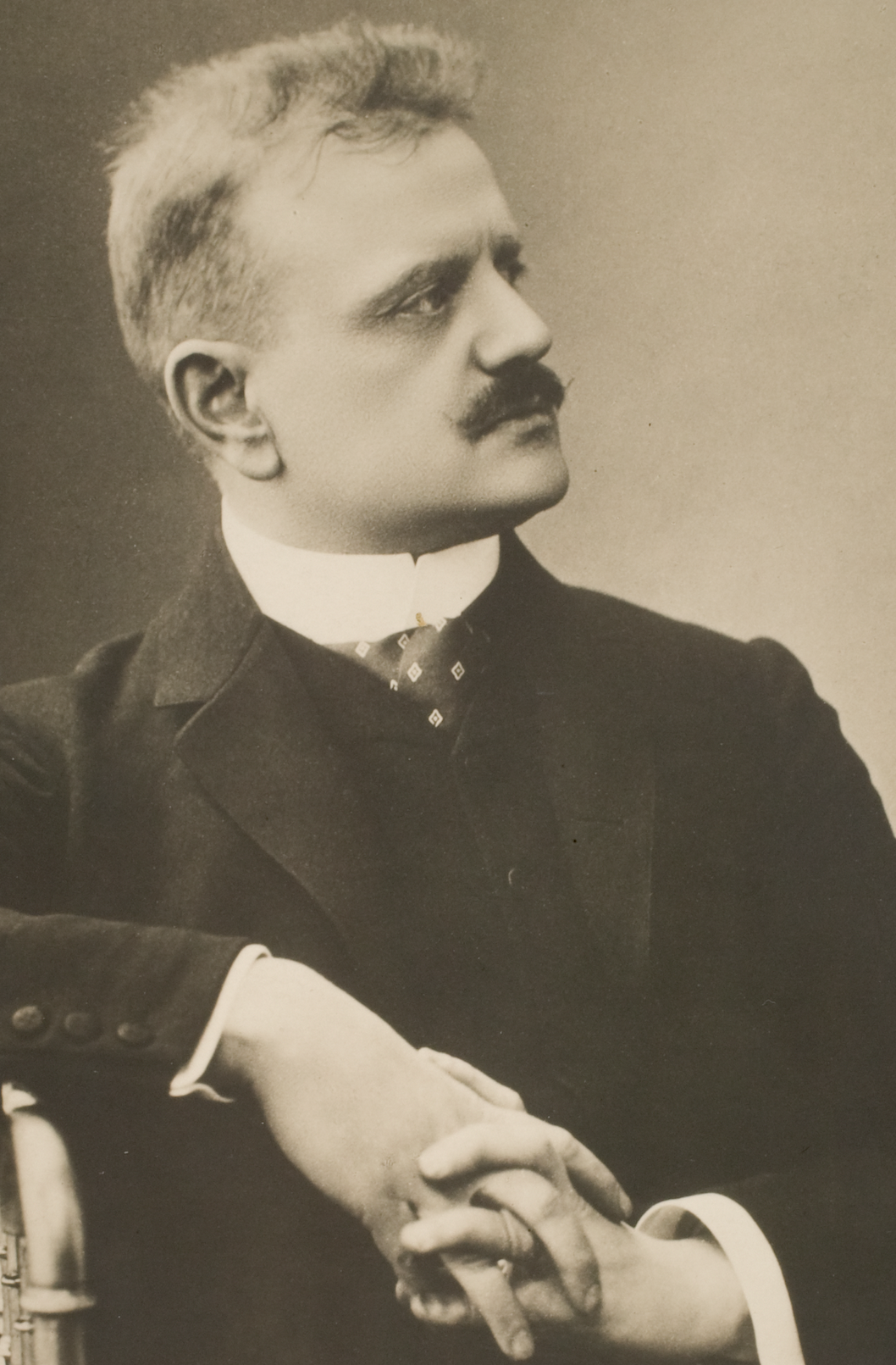
- The composer (c. 1905)
- Opus: 6
- Composed: 1904, rev. 1905
- Publisher: Fazer Music (1995)
- Duration: 13.5 mins. (orig. 12 mins.)

Premiere
- Date: 8 February 1904
- Location: Helsinki, Grand Duchy of Finland
- Conductor: Jean Sibelius
- Performers: Helsinki Philharmonic Society

Cassazione, Op. 6, is a single-movement concert piece for orchestra written in 1904 by the Finnish composer Jean Sibelius. Its title refers to the cassation, a genre similar to the serenade, that was popular in the eighteenth century. Sibelius originally structured the work in five "episodes," although upon revision in 1905 he reduced this to four. Although his opus numbers were already in the forties, he assigned the unused number Op. 6 to this work, implying an earlier composition date.

== History ==
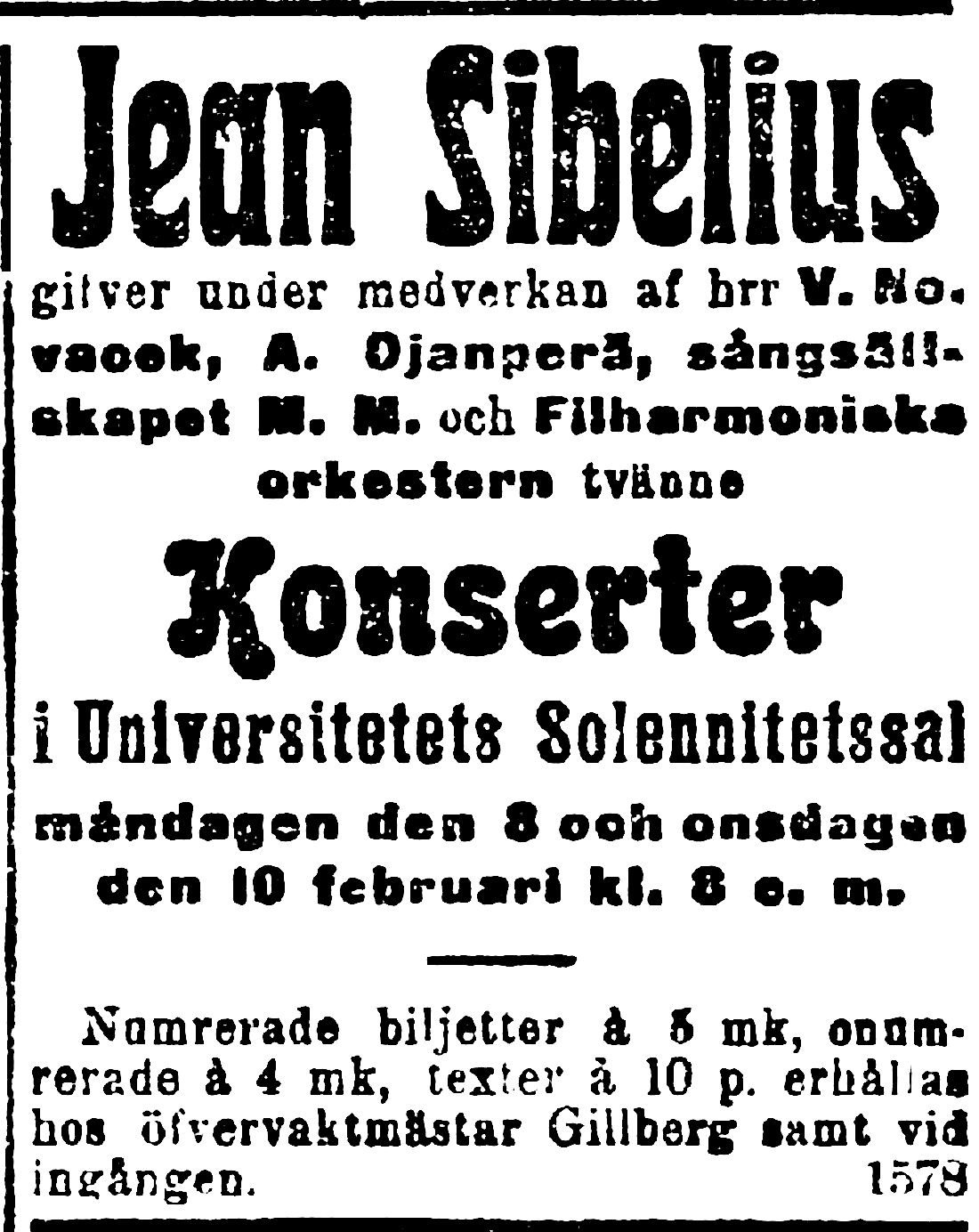
Newspaper advertisement (in Swedish) from Hufvudstadsbladet for the premieres of Jean Sibelius's Violin Concerto and Cassazione

In early 1904, Sibelius labored on his first concertante work, the Violin Concerto in D minor, the premiere of which he had promised, in autumn 1903, to the German violinist Willy Burmester. However, Sibelius—who needed cash in order to fund the construction of his new home, Ainola—opted to premiere the concerto at a concert of his works set for 8 February, even though Burmester was unavailable. (The concerto instead was given by the "far less distinguished player", Viktor Nováček (violin), a young violin teacher based in Helsinki. To fill out the program, Sibelius hastily composed Cassazione a few weeks prior to the concert. Also on the program was The Origin of Fire (Tulen synty, Op. 32), a cantata for tenor, male choir, and orchestra that had premiered in 1902, as well as a third novelty, the choral song for male choir and orchestra, Have Your Courage? (Har du mod?, Op. 31/2). Sibelius conducted the Helsinki Philharmonic Society in all four pieces. The concert was repeated on 10 and 14 February.

A review by Oskar Merikanto evaluated Cassazione as "fairly insignificant". Sibelius revised the work in 1905, but left a note "Bör omarbetas" ("Must be revised").

== Instrumentation ==
In its revised form, Cassazione is scored for the following instruments, organized by family (woodwinds, brass, and strings):

- 2 flutes and 2 clarinets
- 2 horns, 1 trumpet, and 1 trombone
- Violins, violas, cellos, and double basses

The original version of the piece called for much larger orchestral forces, including 2 oboes, 2 bassoons, timpani, and five additional brass players (2 horns, 1 trumpet, and 2 trombones).

== Reviews ==
The beginning of the music, in a chromatic "suspense-filling way", has been compared to the similar opening of Monty Norman's Dr No, the first James Bond film from 1962. Rob Barnett notes in a review of a recording by the Lahti Symphony Orchestra, conducted by Osmo Vänskä as part of a complete recording of the composer's works: "Sibelius must have had a sense of humour to call this work a 'cassation'". He describes it as a ballade for orchestra, beginning: "stern, relentlessly insistent, ferocious and triple forte". He points out a "Balakirev-style clarinet solo", an "Elgarian serenade", and a "chaste oboe solo", concluding: "The piece is played and recorded with wit, rapacious energy and gripping concentration."

== Discography ==
The Estonian-American conductor Neemi Järvi and the Gothenburg Symphony Orchestra made the world premiere studio recording of Cassazione in 1989 for BIS. The table below lists this and other commercially available recordings:

No.	Conductor	Ensemble	Rec. (Note: Refers to the year in which the performers recorded the work; this may not be the same as the year in which the recording was first released to the general public.)	Time	Recording venue	Label	Ref.
1	Neemi Järvi	Gothenburg Symphony Orchestra	1989	12:55	Gothenburg Concert Hall	BIS	(Note: N. Järvi–BIS (CD–448) 1989)
2	Atso Almila	Kuopio Symphony Orchestra	1998	12:27	Kuopio Music Centre	Finlandia	(Note: A. Almila–Finlandia (3984–23391–2) 1999)
3	Tuomas Hannikainen	Tapiola Sinfonietta	2000	10:28	Tapiola Hall, Espoo Cultural Centre	Ondine	(Note: T. Hannikainen–Ondine (ODE 952–2) 2000)
†	Osmo Vänskä	Lahti Symphony Orchestra	2002	12:14	Sibelius Hall	BIS	(Note: O. Vänskä–BIS (CD–1445) 2003)

† = original version (1904)
