= Divertimento No. 1 (Mozart) =

1771 composition by Wolfgang Amadeus Mozart

- by W. A. Mozart
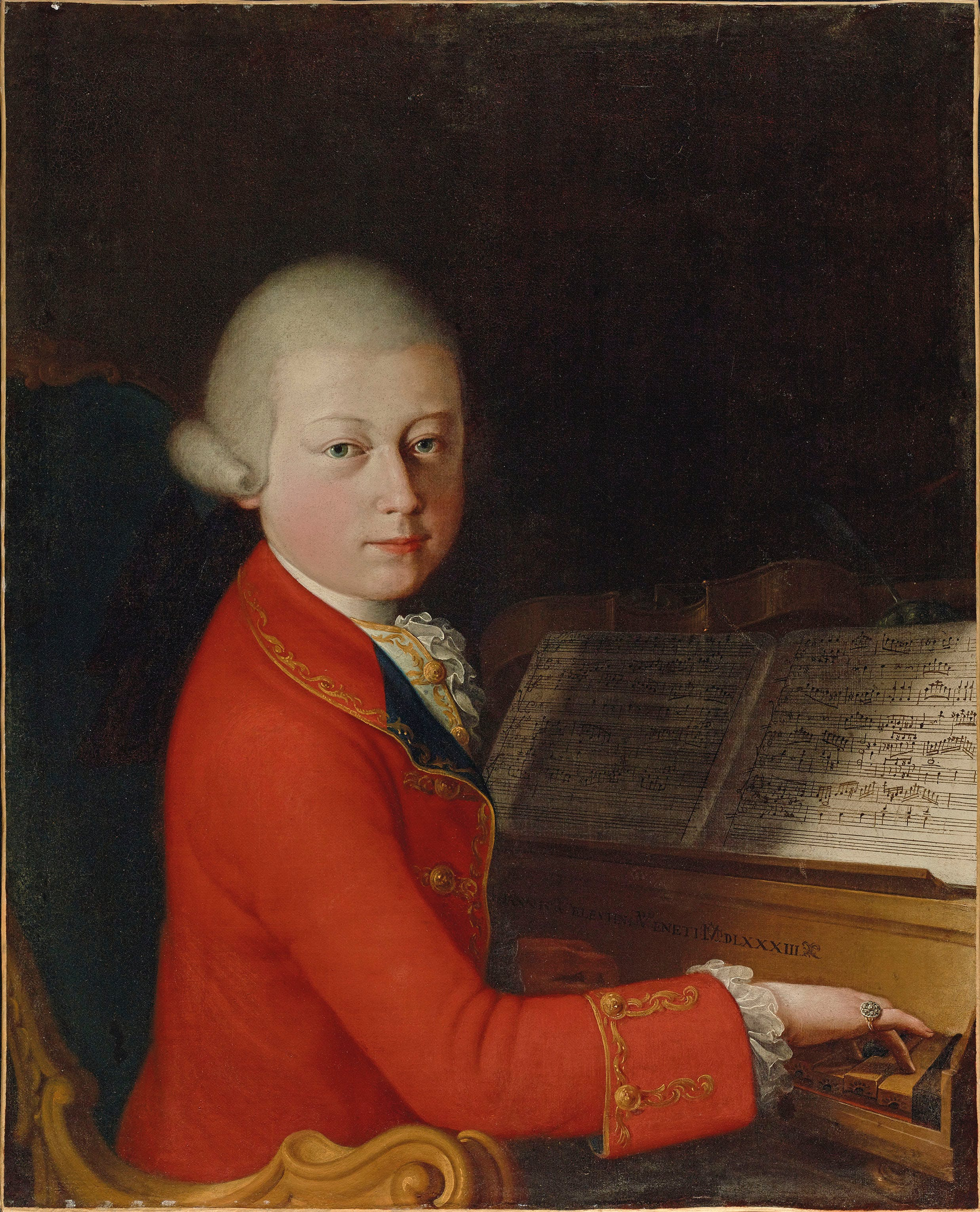
- 1770 portrait of Mozart
- Key: E♭ major
- Catalogue: K. 113
- Composed: c. 13 August – 15 December 1771
- Performed: 22/23 November 1771, Milan
- Movements: 4
- Scoring: 2 clarinets; 2 horns; strings

The Divertimento No. 1 in E♭ major, K. 113, is the first divertimento by Wolfgang Amadeus Mozart (although he had previously composed the three cassations, K. 63, 99 and 100 in 1769). Composed in late 1771. It was most likely first performed on 22 or 23 November for a subscription concert in Milan.

== History ==
The work was not composed, contrary to Mozart's other divertimenti, in Salzburg, but rather on his second visit to Italy. The most probable dates of composition are from 13 August to 15 December 1771. The main purpose of the trip to Italy was for the production of Ascanio in Alba, a festa teatrale commissioned for the wedding celebrations in Milan for Ferdinand Karl (third son of Empress Maria Theresa) and Maria Beatrice d'Este, which was performed there on 17 October.

The autograph score of K. 113 is inscribed in the hand of Leopold Mozart with: "Concerto ò sia Divertimento à 8", and dated "Milano nel Mese Novemb: 1771". The work was most likely performed at a subscription concert on 22 or 23 November, and may have been mentioned in a letter that Leopold sent to his wife in Salzburg, stating: "...strong music we heard yesterday at Herr von Mayr's", although this has not been confirmed.

== Scoring and structure ==
The work is scored for two clarinets in B, two horns in E♭, in F for the second movement, and strings. Later, Mozart re-scored the piece for a wind ensemble of pairs of oboes, clarinets, cor anglais, bassoons, horns and strings, although most performances use the earlier version. It is set in four movements:

1. Allegro
2. Andante in B♭major
3. Minuet (Trio in G minor)
4. Allegro

All four movements are relatively short, beginning with a breezy Allegro, an Andante, a relatively traditional minuet with a trio in G minor and a vivacious finale Allegro. All the movements are reminiscent of the concertante form, making constant use of the two pairs of wind instruments as soloists throughout the work.
