= Nightride and Sunrise =

Tone poem by Jean Sibelius

- Tone poem by Jean Sibelius
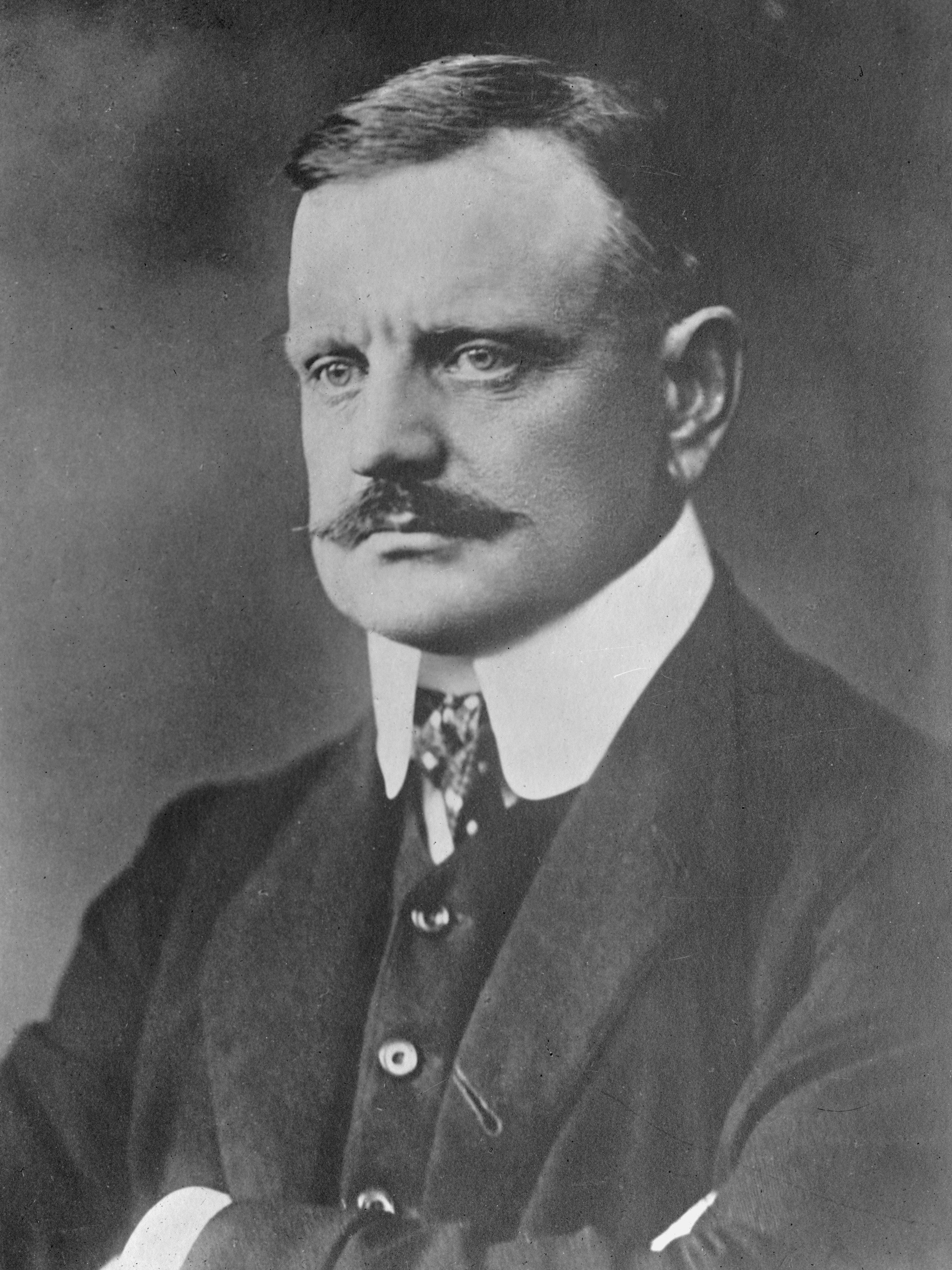
- The composer (c. 1913)
- Native name: Öinen ratsastus ja auringonnousu
- Opus: 55
- Composed: 1908
- Publisher: Lienau (1909)
- Duration: 15 mins.

Premiere
- Date: 23 January 1909
- Location: Saint Petersburg, Russian Empire
- Conductor: Alexander Siloti
- Performers: ?

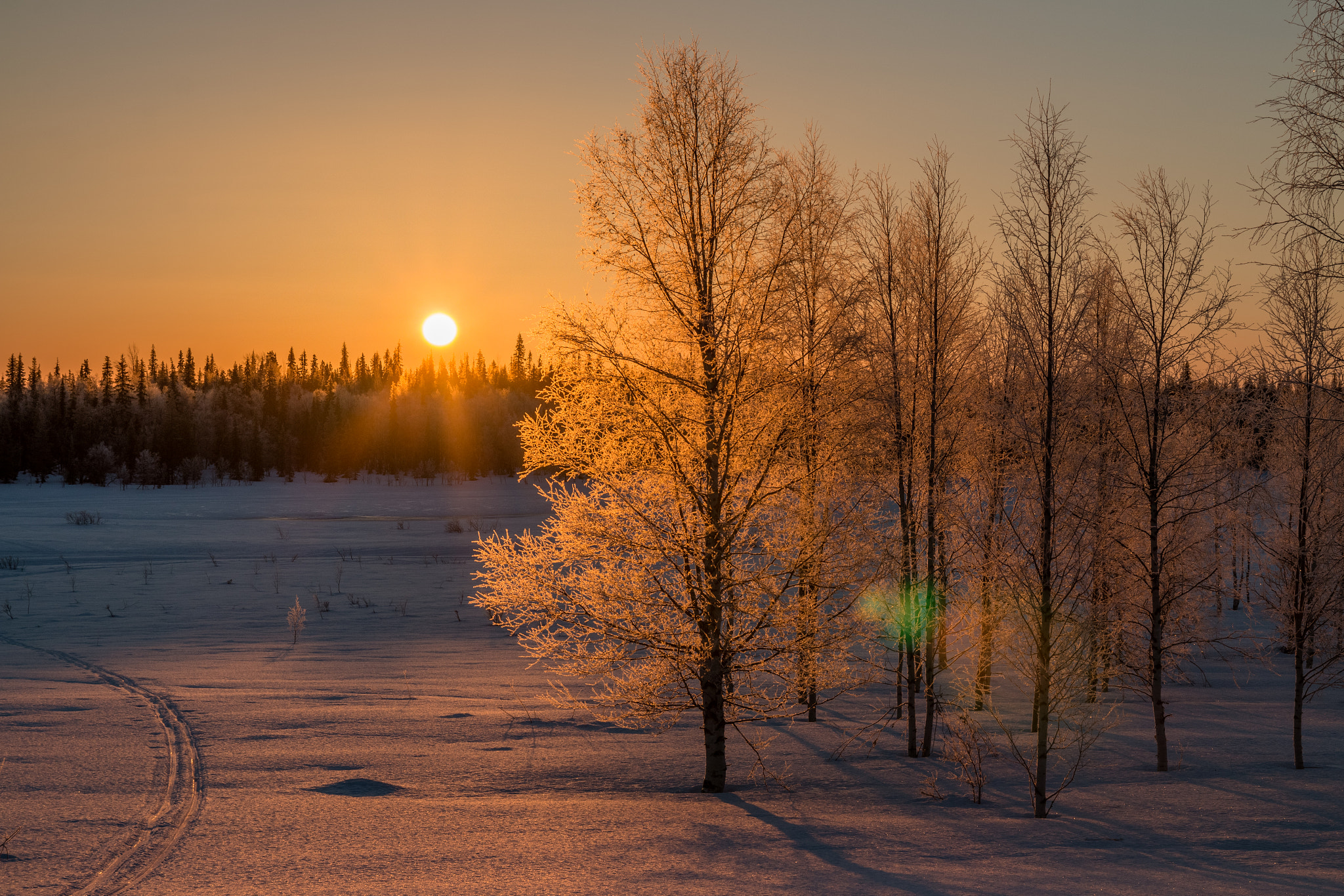
A winter sunrise in Finland. Sibelius mentioned a sunrise he saw during a sleigh ride as a source of inspiration.

Nightride and Sunrise (in Finnish: Öinen ratsastus ja auringonnousu; in German: Nächtlicher Ritt und Sonnenaufgang), Op. 55, is a single-movement tone poem for orchestra written in 1908 by the Finnish composer Jean Sibelius.

The work represents a subjective, spiritual experience of nature by "an ordinary man." It unfolds in three contrasting parts: a galloping section whose length and dogged determination produce one of Sibelius's strangest utterances; a brief hymnic transition in the strings; and an exquisite Northern sunrise whose first rays emerge in the horns.

Although poorly received by audiences initially, the work has gained importance over time. Its repetitive rhythmic patterns and gradual development of musical ideas are characteristics that foreshadow minimalism. The composition is known for expression, artful construction, and psychological weight. The subdued finale was called one of the most magical moments in all of 20th-century music by the American composer Jonathan Blumhofer.

== History ==
Sibelius gave different accounts of the inspiration for this music. One, told to Karl Ekman, was that it was inspired by his first visit to the Colosseum in Rome, in 1901. Another account, given in his later years to his secretary Santeri Levas, was that the inspiration was a sleigh ride from Helsinki to Kerava "at some time around the turn of the century", during which he saw a striking sunrise.

Sibelius completed the score by November 1908 and sent the manuscript to Alexander Siloti, who conducted the first performance, in Saint Petersburg, in 1909. The reviews of the first performance were unfavorable, except for one in Novy Russ, and one reviewer called Siloti's conducting "slack and monotonous". A writer for Novoye Vremya asked, "Who is actually riding, and why?" Siloti had made cuts to the score.

== Instrumentation ==
Nightride and Sunrise is scored for the following instruments, organized by family (woodwinds, brass, percussion, and strings):

- 1 piccolo, 2 flutes, 2 oboes, 2 clarinets (in B♭), 1 bass clarinet (in B♭), 2 bassoons, and 1 contrabassoon
- 4 horns (in F), (Note: The score calls for the horns to be doubled, "if possible", in the 'Sunrise' portion of the work, from marker 41 on.) 2 trumpets (in F), 3 trombones, and tuba
- Timpani, bass drum, snare drum, suspended cymbal, tambourine, and triangle
- Violins (I and II), violas, cellos, and double basses

== Structure ==
A typical performance takes about fourteen minutes.

The composition begins with a dramatic burst from the brass and percussion, followed by a brisk, trotting figure in the strings, reminiscent of Schubert but with more harmonic instability and color. This motive persists for a significant portion of the piece, with the first melody appearing about three minutes in, characterized by a bleak, simple rising figure followed by a descending scale.

As the piece progresses, the initial rhythmic figure in the strings continues, eventually blending with the melody. A notable transition occurs when Sibelius reorders the principal melody’s notes, creating a rich, Slavic chorale texture. This transformation shifts the music from ominous to warm and familiar.

The final third of “Nightride and Sunrise” builds with increasing confidence and splendor, featuring chorales and climaxes. The piece concludes with a magical moment as a crescendo in the strings abruptly reveals a soft E-flat major triad, which fades away gently.

== Discography ==
The British conductor Sir Adrian Boult and the BBC Symphony Orchestra made the world premiere studio recording of Nightride and Sunrise in 1936 for His Master's Voice (released in 2015 by Warner Classics). The sortable table below contains this and other commercially available recordings:

No.	Conductor	Ensemble	Rec. (Note: Refers to the year in which the performers recorded the work; this may not be the same as the year in which the recording was first released to the general public.)	Time	Recording venue	Label	Ref.
1	Sir Adrian Boult (1)	BBC Symphony Orchestra	1936	13:37	Abbey Road Studios	Warner Classics	(Note: A. Boult–Warner Classics (0825646053179) 2015)
2	Sir Anthony Collins	London Symphony Orchestra (1)	1955	14:26	Kingsway Hall	Beulah	(Note: A. Collins–Beulah (3PD8) 1994)
3	Eugen Jochum	Bavarian Radio Symphony Orchestra	1955	13:31	Herkulessaal	Deutsche Grammophon	(Note: E. Jochum–DG (449 718–2) 1996)
4	Sir Adrian Boult (2)	London Philharmonic Orchestra	1956	14:11	Walthamstow Assembly Hall	Somm	(Note: A. Boult–Somm (SOMMCD 093) 2009)
5	Georges Prêtre	New Philharmonia Orchestra (1)	1967	13:27	Walthamstow Town Hall	RCA Red Seal	(Note: G. Prêtre–RCA Red Seal (88985475672) 2017)
6	Antal Doráti	London Symphony Orchestra (2)	1969	15:15	Abbey Road Studios	EMI Classics	(Note: A. Doráti–EMI Classics (7243 5 85785 2 2) 2007)
7	Horst Stein	L'Orchestre de la Suisse Romande	1971	14:23	Victoria Hall	Decca	(Note: H. Stein–Decca (482 3922) 2015)
8	Sir Alexander Gibson	Royal Scottish National Orchestra	1977	15:02	Glasgow City Halls	Chandos	(Note: A. Gibson–Chandos (CHAN 241–19) 2004)
9	Sir Simon Rattle	Philharmonia Orchestra (2)	1981	14:28	Abbey Road Studios	EMI Warner Classics	(Note: S. Rattle–EMI (0825646198788) 2015)
10	Kurt Sanderling	Berlin Symphony Orchestra	1983	16:11	Christuskirche, Berlin	Brilliant Classics	(Note: K. Sanderling–Brilliant Classics (6328/5) 2002)
11	Neeme Järvi (1)	Gothenburg Symphony Orchestra (1)	1985	15:32	Gothenburg Concert Hall	BIS	(Note: N. Järvi–BIS (CD–311) 1986)
12	Jukka-Pekka Saraste (1)	Finnish Radio Symphony Orchestra	1988	13:32	Kulttuuritalo	RCA Red Seal	(Note: J. Saraste–RCA Red Seal (194397048124) 2020)
13	Vassily Sinaisky	Moscow Philharmonic Orchestra	1991	14:15	Mosfilm Studios	Brilliant Classics	(Note: V. Sinaisky–Brilliant Classics (BC9212) 2010)
14	Neeme Järvi (2)	Gothenburg Symphony Orchestra (2)	1995	14:49	Gothenburg Concert Hall	Deutsche Grammophon	(Note: N. Järvi–DG (453 426–2) 1997)
15	Paavo Järvi	Royal Stockholm Philharmonic Orchestra	1996	14:41	Stockholm Concert Hall	Virgin Classics	(Note: P. Järvi–Virgin Classics (243 5 45213 2 4) 1996)
16	Leif Segerstam	Helsinki Philharmonic Orchestra	1998	16:40	Hyvinkääsali	Ondine	(Note: L. Segerstam–Ondine (ODE 914–2) 1998)
17	Sir Colin Davis	London Symphony Orchestra (3)	1998	17:01	Walthamstow Assembly Hall	RCA Red Seal	(Note: C. Davis–RCA Red Seal (09026–68770–2) 1999)
18	Jukka-Pekka Saraste (2)	Toronto Symphony Orchestra	1998	14:19	Massey Hall	Finlandia	(Note: J. Saraste–Finlandia (3984–27890–2) 2000)
19	Osmo Vänskä	Lahti Symphony Orchestra	2001	17:20	Sibelius Hall	BIS	(Note: O. Vänskä–BIS (CD–1225) 2002)
20	Pietari Inkinen	New Zealand Symphony Orchestra	2007	16:38	Michael Fowler Centre	Naxos	(Note: P. Inkinen–Naxos (8.570763) 2008)

== Notes, references, and sources ==
Notes

Sources

- Dahlström, Fabian [in Swedish] (2003). Jean Sibelius: Thematisch-bibliographisches Verzeichnis seiner Werke [Jean Sibelius: A Thematic Bibliographic Index of His Works] (in German). Wiesbaden: Breitkopf & Härtel. ISBN 3-7651-0333-0.
- Tawaststjerna, Erik W. (1986). Sibelius, Volume II: 1904–1914. Translated by Robert Layton. London: Faber and Faber. ISBN 978-0571247738.
