= Cassation in D major, K. 100 =

1769 composition by Wolfgang Amadeus Mozart

Cassation in D major
- by W. A. Mozart
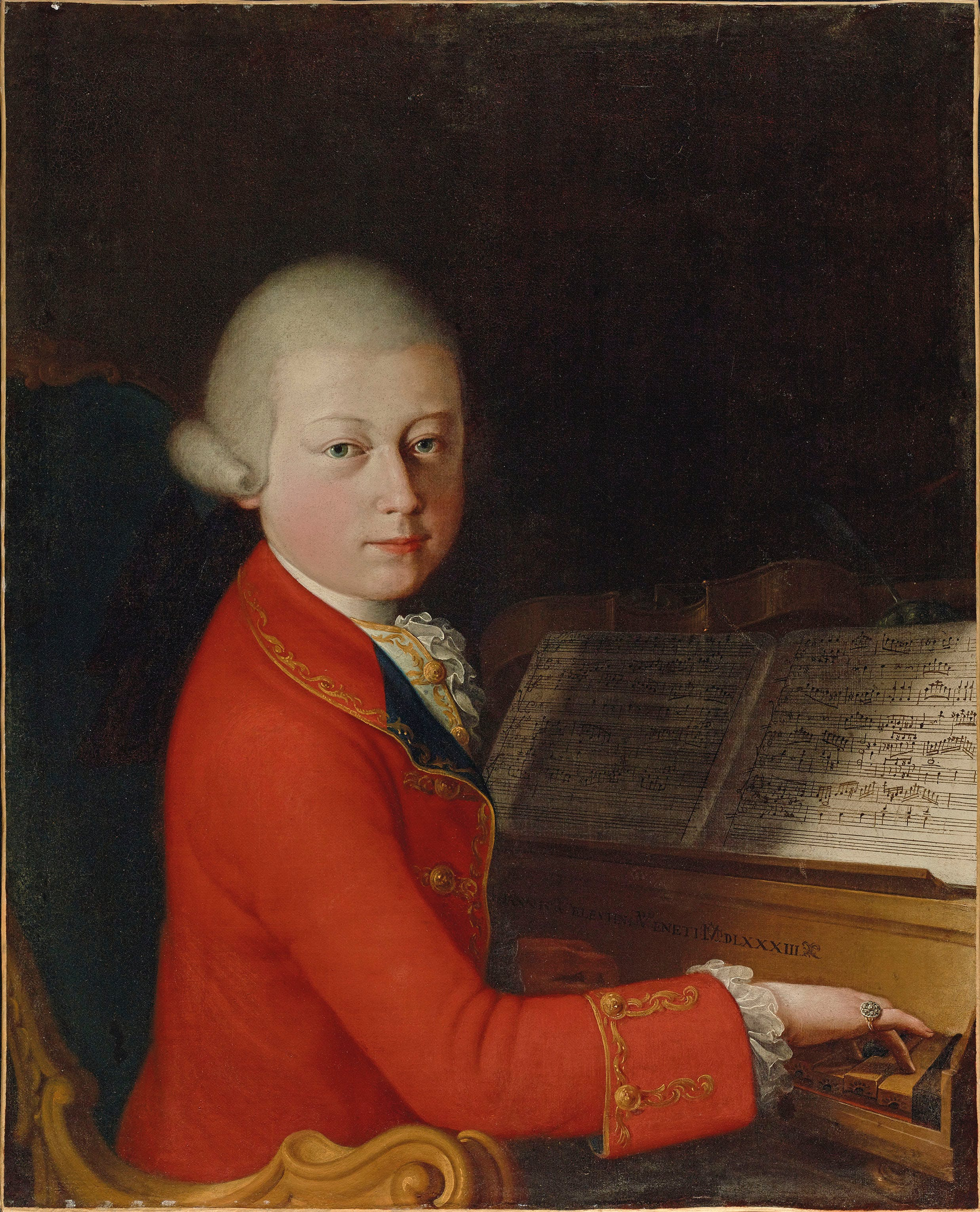
- 1770 Verona portrait of Mozart
- Other name: Serenade No. 1
- Catalogue: K. 100/62a
- Composed: 1769
- Duration: c. 26 minutes
- Movements: 8
- Scoring: Orchestra

The Cassation in D major, K. 100/62a (also known as Serenade No. 1) is a composition for orchestra by Wolfgang Amadeus Mozart. It was composed in Salzburg in 1769, along with two other similar works, K. 63 and 99. It is set in eight movements (excluding a separately composed introductory march).

A typical performance of the work would last around 26 minutes.

== History ==
The cassation was written most probably in the summer of 1769, and although the exact reasons for composition are not known, it has been suggested that it was written for the Archbishop of Salzburg. The three central movements feature prominent use of the oboe and horn, and this may well have been the first time Mozart wrote for Joseph Ignaz Leutgeb, a talented horn player for whom Mozart would later write his four horn concertos.

== March, K. 62 ==
The March in D major, K. 62, that opens the cassation was used again by Mozart in Act 1 of his opera Mitridate, re di Ponto, K. 87, which premiered in Milan on 26 December 1770. The March was long presumed lost until it was discovered that the march in the opera was in fact the same one used as the introductory movement to this work. The autograph score of the march includes parts for cellos and timpani, neither of which appear in the serenade itself, due to inconvenience being played outdoors.

== Scoring and structure ==
The work is scored for 2 oboes, 2 horns and trumpets in D and strings (with the addition of cellos and timpani in D and A for the march). It is set in eight movements:

1. Allegro, in D major
2. Andante, 3/4 in D major
3. Menuetto, 3/4 in G major (Trio in D major)
4. Allegro, 2/4 in D major
5. Menuetto, 3/4 in D major (Trio in G major)
6. Andante, 2/4 in A major
7. Menuetto, 3/4 in D major (Trio in D minor)
8. Allegro, 3/8 in D major

The first of the eight movements that follow the introductory march is an Allegro in D. The three central movements are an Andante, a minuet in G for strings only (with a trio in D) and another Allegro all feature both oboe and horn as prominent soloists (hence the fact that this may have been written for Leutgeb). The fifth movement is another minuet, with a trio in G for strings, followed by a tender Andante in A for muted violins, divided violas, pizzicato basses and flutes replacing the oboes. Next, another minuet, with a trio for strings alone in D minor, and finishing with a rondo finale.
