= Göteborgs Konsthall =

Contemporary art museum in Gothenburg, Sweden

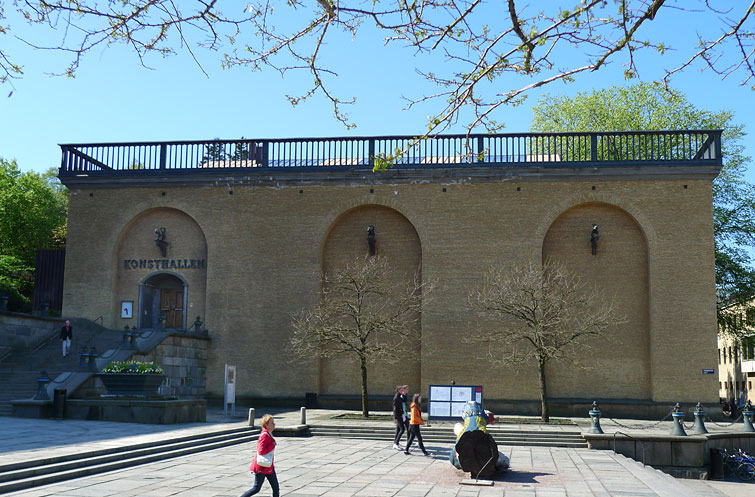
- Established: 1923
- Location: Götaplatsen, Gothenburg, Sweden
- Type: Contemporary art museum
- Website: goteborgskonsthall.se/en/

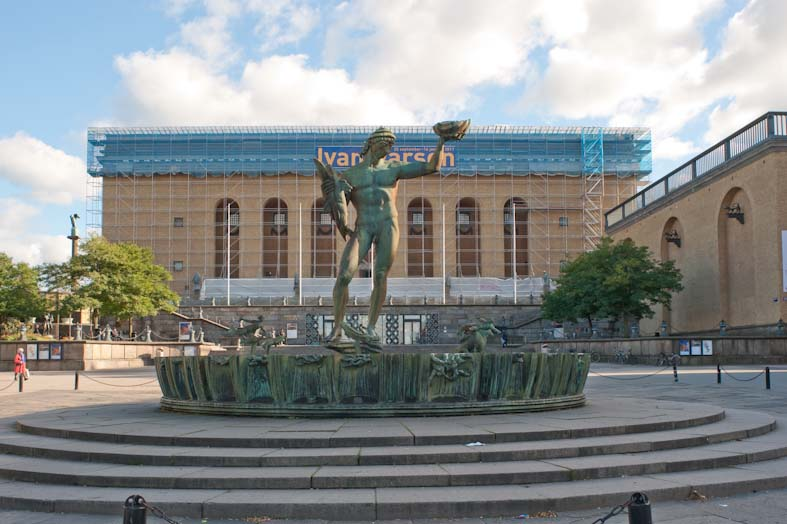
Göteborgs Konsthall, is located to the right on Götaplatsen next to the Gothenburg Museum of Art.

Göteborgs Konsthall is a contemporary art exhibition hall in Gothenburg, Sweden.

== Description ==
Göteborgs Konsthall exhibits both Swedish and international art. It is situated in a classicist building from 1923 at Götaplatsen in the center of the city, next to Gothenburg Museum of Art (Göteborgs konstmuseum). Göteborgs Konsthall investigates the various forms of contemporary art and presents around five exhibitions a year. Alongside the exhibitions, Göteborgs Konsthall presents guided tours, creative workshops, artists talks, workshops, film screenings, performances, and in-depth lectures. Entrance is always free of charge for both program and exhibitions.

== History ==
Göteborgs Konsthall was designed by architects Sigfrid Ericson (1879–1958) and Arvid Bjerke (1880–1952). Göteborgs Konsthall was built during 1923 as an art exhibition hall for the Gothenburg Exhibition (Jubileumsutställningen i Göteborg) in celebration of the city's 300th anniversary. After the jubilee fair, the Gothenburg art association took over the direction until 1968 when the direction was handed over to the city and Göteborgs Konsthall became a part of Gothenburg Museum of Art. In 1995, the city decided to close down Göteborgs Konsthall due to financial difficulties. After protests the exhibition space was reopened in 1996 and stayed open until 2000. In 2001, the konsthall reopened as a division of the City of Gothenburg Cultural Affairs Administration.

For a period of about one and a half years, until the end of 2008, the art gallery was led by Mikael Nanfeldt as acting director. During this period, the group exhibition History Acts was produced with, among others, Björn Lövin, Gerard Byrne, Karina Nimmerfall, Michael Stevenson and Peter Watkins.

In May 2010, the Social Democrats and the Green Party in Gothenburg presented a vision of a newly built art gallery for contemporary art, which would be ready in 2015 in the newly designed area around Backaplan. At the same time, the question was raised to close the current operations at Gothenburg Art Gallery from the turn of the year 2011, but the proposal was rejected due to massive protests.

When Crone Jensen resigned as head in September 2010, Nanfeldt took over the management again, first as acting head and then as regular. Discussions about the art gallery's location, and a possible new art gallery have continued. In 2016, Mikael Nanfeldt became head of the department for cultural strategy, which was newly started in the cultural administration, and in November 2016, the administrative leadership of the Gothenburg Art Gallery was taken over by Ann-Sofi Roxhage. 2017 saw Stina Edblom get hired as artistic director and in 2023, Petra Johansson was assigned the role.

== Related reading ==
- Södergren, Arvid (1923) Historiskt kartverk över Göteborg upprättat för jubileumsutställningen i Göteborg (Göteborg: V. Wengelin)
