= Gothenburg congestion tax =

Congestion tax in Gothenburg, Sweden

Payment border

The Gothenburg congestion tax (Swedish: Trängselskatt i Göteborg), also referred to as the Gothenburg congestion charge, is a congestion pricing system implemented as a tax levied on most vehicles entering and exiting central Gothenburg, Sweden, as well as some main roads passing by the city. The congestion tax was introduced on 1 January 2013, with the Stockholm congestion tax as a model.

The primary purpose of the congestion tax is to reduce traffic congestion and improve the environmental situation in central Gothenburg, and to provide financing for large road and rail construction projects in and around Gothenburg. The largest such project is the West Link railway line.

== Affected area ==
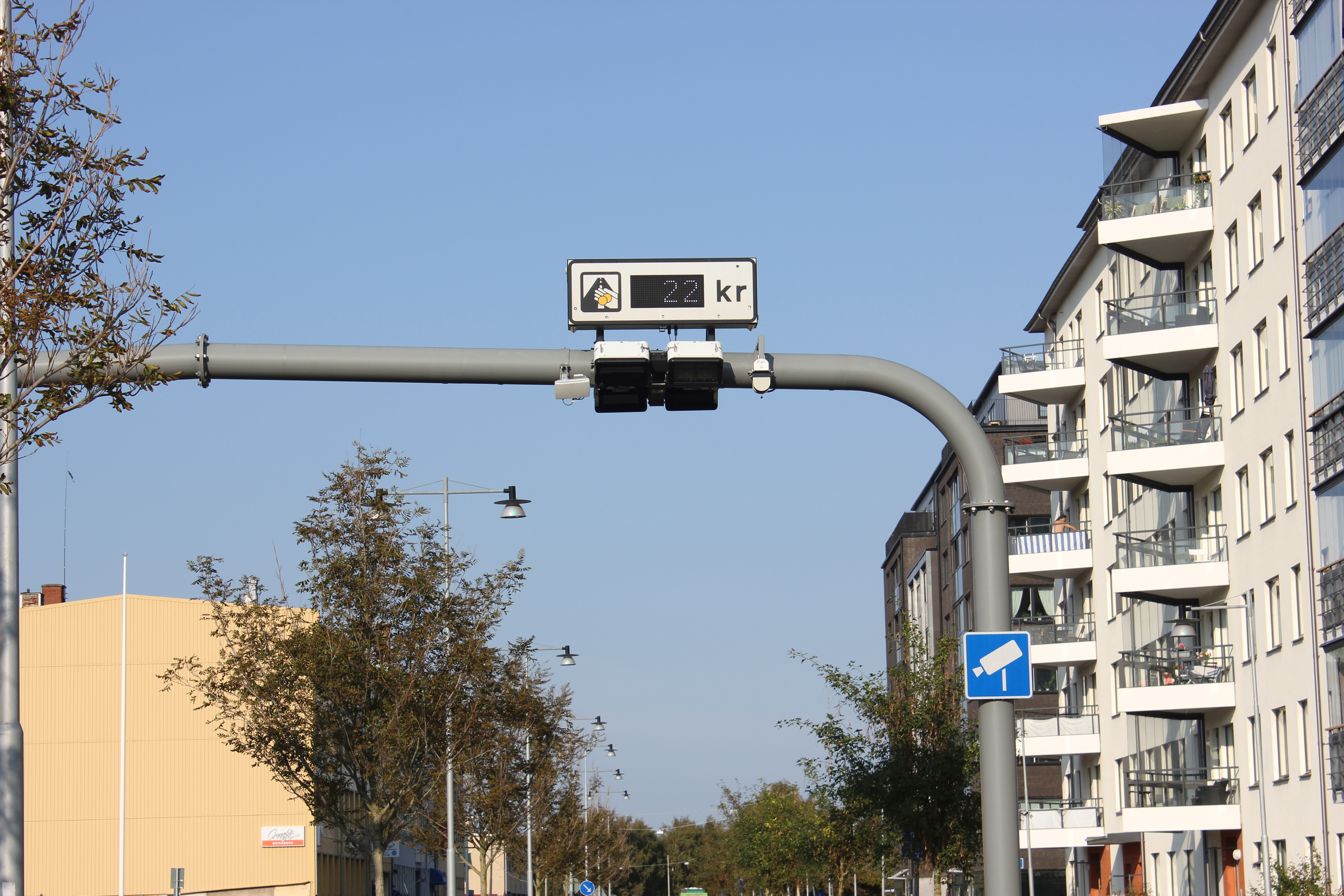
A toll collection point

The congestion tax area encompasses the majority of Gothenburg city centre. There have been 38 toll points (Swedish: Betalstation) in Gothenburg since late 2020. These are unmanned and barrier-free. The toll points are located in central Gothenburg (including Lindholmen) and at river crossings. Since late 2020, the newly built Marieholm Tunnel also has a toll point. Major highways passing through the city, including E6 and E20, are also subject to congestion charges. To prevent drivers from using unsuitable roads to avoid tolls, some roads outside the main toll ring are also charged. This includes roads in Backa and Örgryte. Residents in these areas must pay tolls both to leave the city and to reach the city center.A special arrangement exists in Backa, where toll points are placed south of the area. Only vehicles passing two toll points on both sides of Backa within 30 minutes are charged. This system, implemented on May 1, 2018, aims to charge through traffic while exempting local residents who don't cross the main toll ring. The congestion tax is applied when passing points in both directions.

== Results ==
The total traffic volume across the affected area during charged hours decreased by approximately 10% in the first year, with inner city streets experiencing an average 9% reduction during charged hours, and a 6% reduction during non-charged hours. Some circumferential roads saw increased traffic volumes, indicating route choice effects. Public transport trips for affected routes increased by 9% in the initial months post-implementation.

== Pricing ==
Swedish "Road toll" sign

The amount of tax payable depends on what time of the day a motorist enters or exits the congestion tax area. There is no charge on Saturdays, Sundays, public holidays, the day before public holidays, during nights (18:30 – 05:59), or during July.

Time of day	Tax
00:00 – 05:59	0 SEK
06:00 – 06:29	9 SEK
06:30 – 06:59	16 SEK
07:00 – 07:59	22 SEK
08:00 – 08:29	16 SEK
08:30 – 14:59	9 SEK
15:00 – 15:29	16 SEK
15:30 – 16:59	22 SEK
17:00 – 17:59	16 SEK
18:00 – 18:29	9 SEK
18:30 – 23:59	0 SEK

The maximum amount of tax per vehicle per day is 60 SEK (6.40 Euro, 7.70 USD). 22 SEK is around 2.35 Euro or 2.80 USD. If a vehicle passes two stations within one hour, only the higher tax is paid.

Certain vehicles are exempt from congestion tax, including diplomatic-registered vehicles, emergency vehicles, buses with a total weight of at least 14 tons, and EC mobile cranes, including those registered abroad. Individuals with a disabled parking permit may apply for an exemption for one vehicle.

Foreign registered vehicles were exempt until 2014 mainly for practical reasons, hard to get access to foreign car registers, and to claim payment from foreigners. But they are included now because of objections from companies about unfair taxation, and because the "Eurovignette" EU directive (1999/62/EC article 7 and 2006/38/EC) requires that user charges may not discriminate on the grounds of the nationality of the haulier or the origin of the vehicle. The authority has contracted a collection agency, ParkTrade, which in turn has contracted collection agencies in the most common countries that charge the owners, using the brand name EPASS24.

Rental car customers will be billed afterwards, typically around two months after the rental period, because the authority takes its time to calculate, decide and bill the tax. For this reason it is not possible for the customer to quickly pay the tax. Administrative fee and VAT will be added even if the tax has no VAT, because the payment to the rental company is legally seen as rental fee. Some rental company adds a fixed fee in order to cover the tax cost if renting in Gothenburg.

== See also ==
- Gothenburg quadricentennial jubilee
- Road pricing
- Congestion pricing
- Electronic toll collection
- Stockholm congestion tax
