= Divertimento =

Lighthearted genre of music

Divertimento /dɪˌvɜːrtɪˈmɛntoʊ/ (Italian: [divertiˈmento]; from the Italian divertire 'to amuse') is a musical genre, with most of its examples from the 18th century. The mood of the divertimento is most often lighthearted (as a result of being played at social functions) and it is generally composed for a small ensemble. The term is used to describe a wide variety of secular (non-religious) instrumental works for soloist or chamber ensemble. It is usually a kind of music entertainment, although it could also be applied to a more serious genre. After 1780, the term generally designated works that were informal or light.

== Genre ==
As a separate genre, it appears to have no specific form, although most of the divertimenti of the second half of the 18th century go either back to a dance suite approach (derived from the 'ballet' type of theatrical divertimento), or take the form of other chamber music genres of their century (as a continuation of the merely instrumental theatrical divertimento). There are many other terms which describe music similar to the divertimento, including serenade, cassation, notturno, Nachtmusik; after about 1780, the divertimento was the term most commonly applied to this light, "after-dinner" and often outdoor music. Divertimenti have from one to nine movements, and there is at least one example with thirteen. The earliest publication to use the name "divertimento" is by Carlo Grossi in 1681 in Venice (Il divertimento de' grandi: musiche da camera, ò per servizio di tavola) and the hint that the divertimento is to accompany "table service" applies to later ages as well, since this light music was often used to accompany banquets and other social events.

== Examples ==
Wolfgang Amadeus Mozart is known for having composed different types of divertimenti, sometimes even taking the form of a small symphony (or, more exactly: sinfonia), for example, the Salzburg Symphonies K. 136, K. 137 and K. 138. Even more unusual is his six-movement string trio, the Divertimento in E-flat, K. 563, which is a serious work belonging with his string quartets and quintets. Other composers of divertimenti include Leopold Mozart, Carl Stamitz, Joseph Haydn, and Luigi Boccherini.

Several examples exist from the 20th century, including works by Alfred Reed, Nikolai Medtner, Ferruccio Busoni, Vincent Persichetti, Charles Wuorinen, Sergei Prokofiev, Béla Bartók, Benjamin Britten, Leonard Bernstein, Paul Graener, Gordon Jacob, Lennox Berkeley, Gareth Walters, Malcolm Arnold, Lars-Erik Larsson, Saint-Preux, Bohuslav Martinů, and Joe Hisaishi. Igor Stravinsky also arranged a divertimento from his ballet to music of Tchaikovsky, Le baiser de la fée, while Joaquín Rodrigo called his 1982 cello concerto a "Concierto como un divertimento" ("Concerto like a divertimento"). Robert Davine also composed a Divertimento for Flute, Clarinet, Bassoon and Accordion for chamber music ensemble.

== See also ==
- For historic roots of the divertimento, and for divertimentos and divertissements as stage productions, see entr'acte and divertissement.
- Divertimento No. 1 (Mozart)
