= Carlo Grossi =

Italian composer

Carlo Grossi (c. 1634 – 14 May 1688) was an Italian composer.

== Life ==
He is believed to have been the first composer to use the term "divertimento", in his 1681 composition Il divertimento de' grandi musiche da camera, ò per servizio di tavola.

He was the organist at the church of SS. Giovanni e Paolo.

He is also known for setting Hebrew religious texts to recitative in the style of Claudio Monteverdi, such as in his Cantata Ebraica in Dialogo, a work commissioned from Grossi (himself a Gentile) by the relatively free and well-off Jewish community of Modena. This work was likely intended for performance by an amateur choir (the choral parts are relatively simple, suggesting deliberate tailoring to the capabilities of less advanced musicians) with professional-standard operatic soloists.

Grossi died in 1688 at Venice.

== Works ==
- Concerti eccleseastici Op. 1 (1657)
- Sonatas Op. 3
- Moderne Melodie: a voce sola: con due, trè, quattro, e cinque stromenti, e partitura per l'organo Op. 8 (Bologna, Giacomo Monti, 1676)
- Currite pastores con 5 stromenti
- Cantata ebraica in dialogo (Modena, 1681)
- Il divertimento di Grandi, musiche da camera ò per sevicio di tavola… Op. 9 (Antwerpen, 1681)
