= Gothenburg Museum of Art =

Art museum in Gothenburg, Sweden

- Göteborgs konstmuseum (Swedish)
- Established: 1925; 101 years ago
- Location: Götaplatsen, Gothenburg, Sweden
- Coordinates: 57°41′47″N 11°58′50″E
- Type: Art museum
- Collections: 70,000 works
- Visitors: 250,000 annually
- Director: Patrik Steorn
- Website: Official website

The Gothenburg Museum of Art (Göteborgs konstmuseum) is an art museum located in the city of Gothenburg, Sweden. The collection consists of more than 70,000 works in total, most of which are Nordic art from the 15th century until today. It is the third largest museum in Sweden by number of art works, succeeded only by the Swedish National Museum (Nationalmuseum) and the Modern Museum (Moderna museet) in Stockholm. The museum is part of the Gothenburg Cultural Administration (Göteborgs stads kulturförvaltning),

In 2018, the museum was awarded the Swedish Museum of the Year Award (Årets museum). Approximately 250,000 people visit annually. The building is located at the Götaplatsen, in the southern end of The Avenue (Kungsportsavenyen), and is an individual-listed building since April 2017.

== History ==
The museum has its roots in the Museum of Gothenburg, founded in 1861. In 1923, as part of the construction of Götaplatsen as a cultural center, the museum's building was built. In 1925, the museum was inaugurated. It was expanded in 1968 and 1996.

== Building ==
The museum building was designed for the Gothenburg Tercentennial Jubilee Exposition (Jubileumsutställningen i Göteborg) in 1923 by architect Sigfrid Ericson (1879–1958). The eastern extension was added in 1966–1968, after drawings by Rune Falk (1926–2007). It was originally built in celebration of the city's 300th anniversary, and represents the monumental Neo-Classical style in Nordic architecture. It is built of a yellow brick called "Gothenburg brick" because of the material's frequent use in the city. The museum forms the imposing end of the main street of the city, Kungsportsavenyn.

== Collections ==
The museum holds the world's finest collection of late 19th-century Nordic art. A highlight is the lavishly decorated Fürstenberg Gallery, named after a leading Gothenburg art donor, Pontus Fürstenberg and his wife Göthilda. Among the artists showcased are P.S. Krøyer, Carl Larsson, Bruno Liljefors, Edvard Munch, and Anders Zorn.

The museum also houses older and contemporary art, both Nordic and international. The collection includes, for example, works by Monet, Picasso and Rembrandt. The museum has been awarded three stars in the Michelin Green Guide (Green Guide Scandinavia).

== Gallery ==
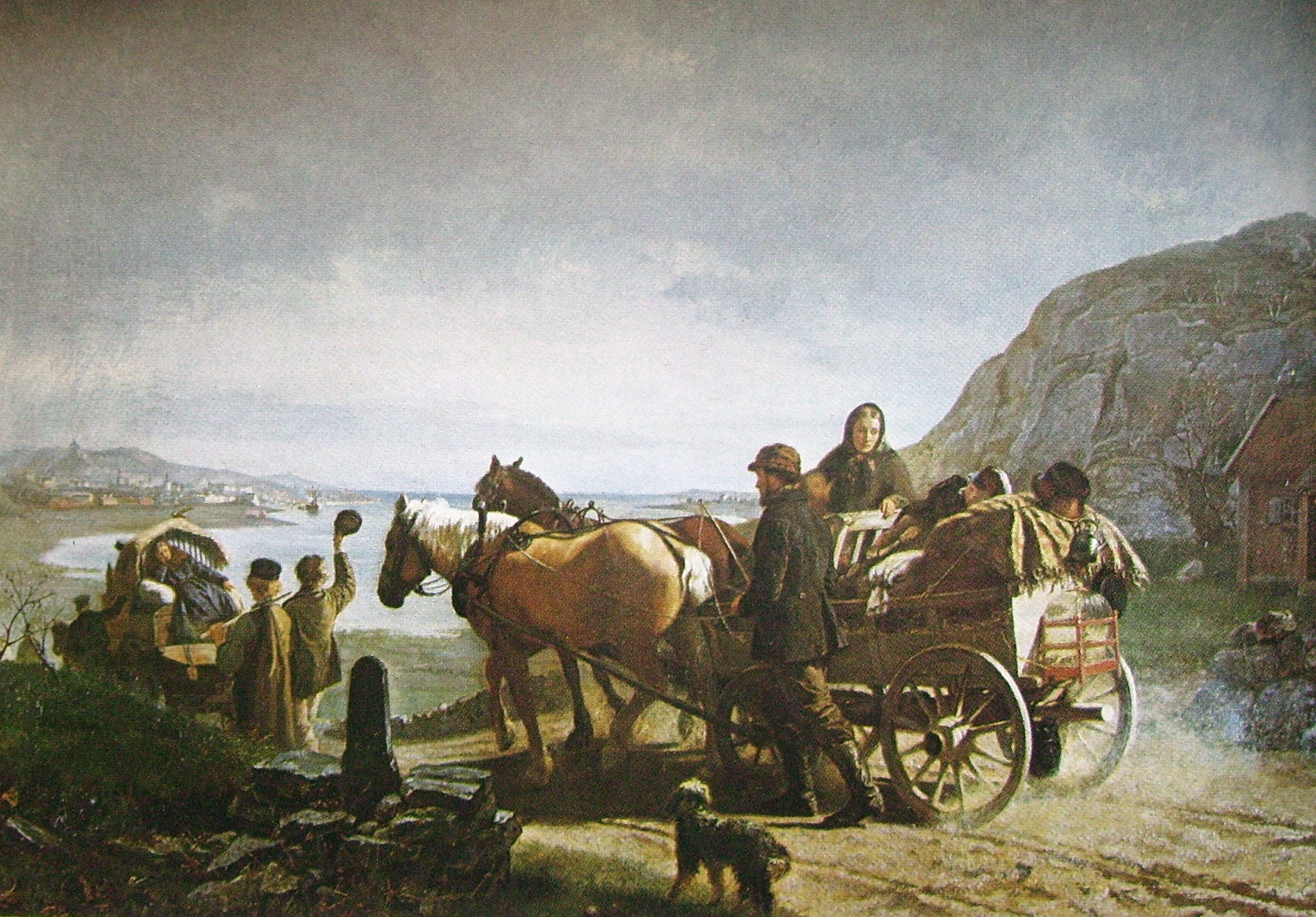
Emigration from Gothenburg (1872) by Geskel Saloman

Hip, Hip, Hurrah! (1886) by Peder Severin Krøyer

Outdoors (1888) by Anders Zorn

Olive Grove, Saint-Rémy (1889) by Vincent van Gogh

Cat hunting Birds (1883) by Bruno Liljefors

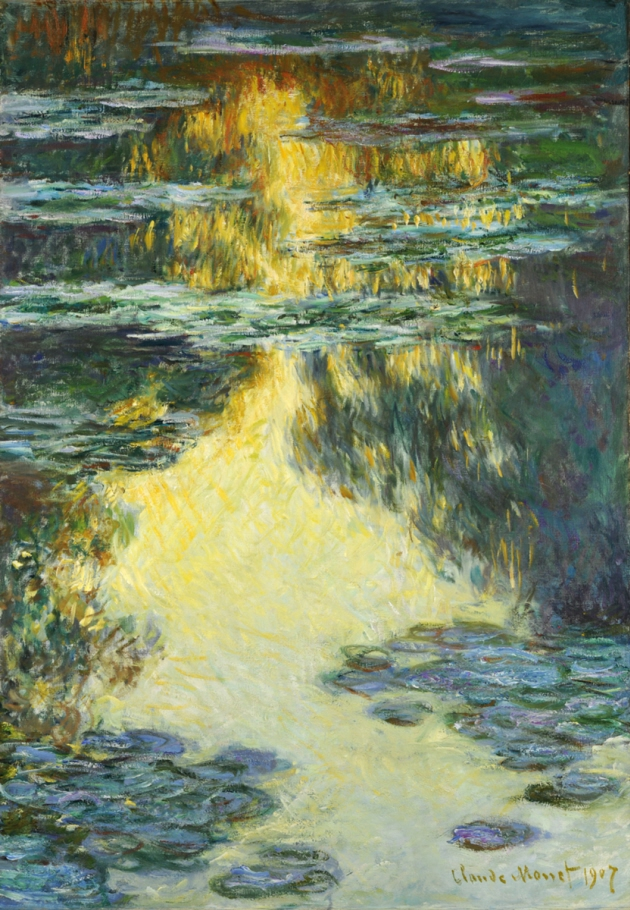
Water Lilies (1907) by Claude Monet

Reclining Model (c. 1914) by Karl Isakson

The Vampire (1893) by Edvard Munch

== See also ==
- Museum of Gothenburg
- Gothenburg Art Exhibition
- Hasselblad Foundation
