= Gothenburg quadricentennial jubilee =

400th anniversary celebrations of the city of Gothenburg in Sweden

The Gothenburg quadricentennial jubilee (Swedish: Göteborg 2021) was originally scheduled to be held in Gothenburg, Sweden, in 2021 to celebrate the 400th anniversary of the city. Due to the COVID-19 pandemic in Sweden, organizers postponed the celebrations to 2023, while a small-scale event took take place in 2021. The anniversary follows the city's tricentennial jubilee held in 1923 (which was intended to be held in 1921, but was delayed due to World War I).

The city was granted its founding royal charter in 1621, by King Gustavus Adolphus.

== Themes ==
The executive committee appointed to plan the celebrations is focusing on seven themes:

1. Green Town
2. City of Culture
3. Knowledge City
4. Young Town
5. Experience The City
6. Growing Town
7. Open Town

== Ongoing projects ==
The work of several existing projects is being integrated into the overall jubilee project:

- Bergsjön 2021
- BoStad2021
- Campus Näckrosen, University of Gothenburg
- Älvstaden, including the New Göta Älvbron
- A borderless West Sweden
- Cultural institution's role
- Mistra Urban Futures
- Red Stone Konsthall
- Sustainable Gothenburg
- Wake Gothenburg
- Developing the North East
- Vision Angered
- West Swedish package
  - A more sustainable transport system
  - Marieholm Tunnel
  - New Götaälvbro
  - Congestion charges
  - Developed public transport
  - West Link

== See also ==
- Gothenburg Exhibition (1923)
