= Gothenburg Concert Hall =

Coordinates: 57°41′49″N 11°58′45″E

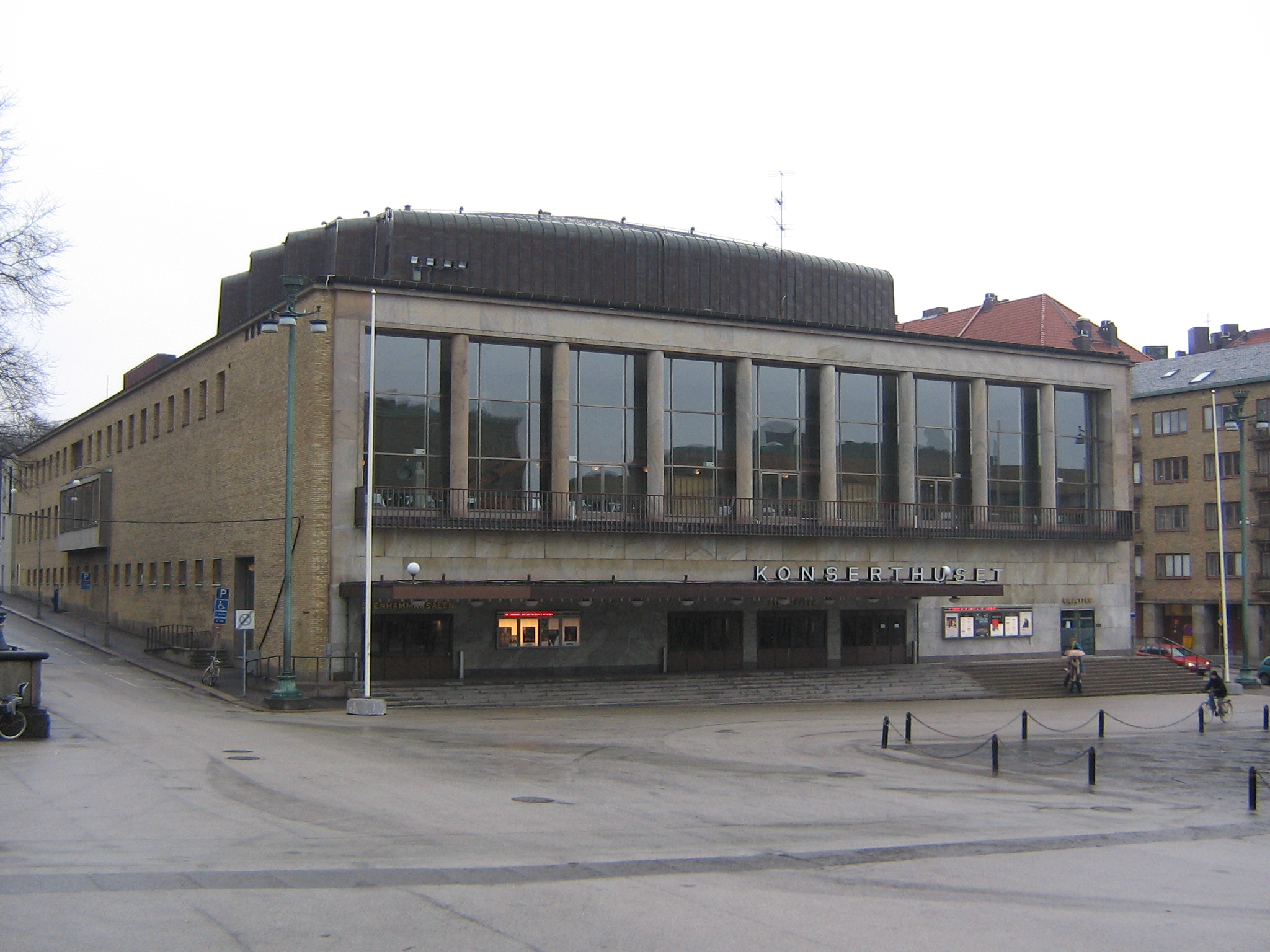
- Gothenburg Concert Hall
- Interactive map of the Gothenburg Concert Hall area

General information
- Architectural style: Neoclassical architecture
- Location: Gothenburg, Sweden
- Completed: 1935

Design and construction
- Architect: Nils Einar Ericsson

Other information
- Seating capacity: 1,300

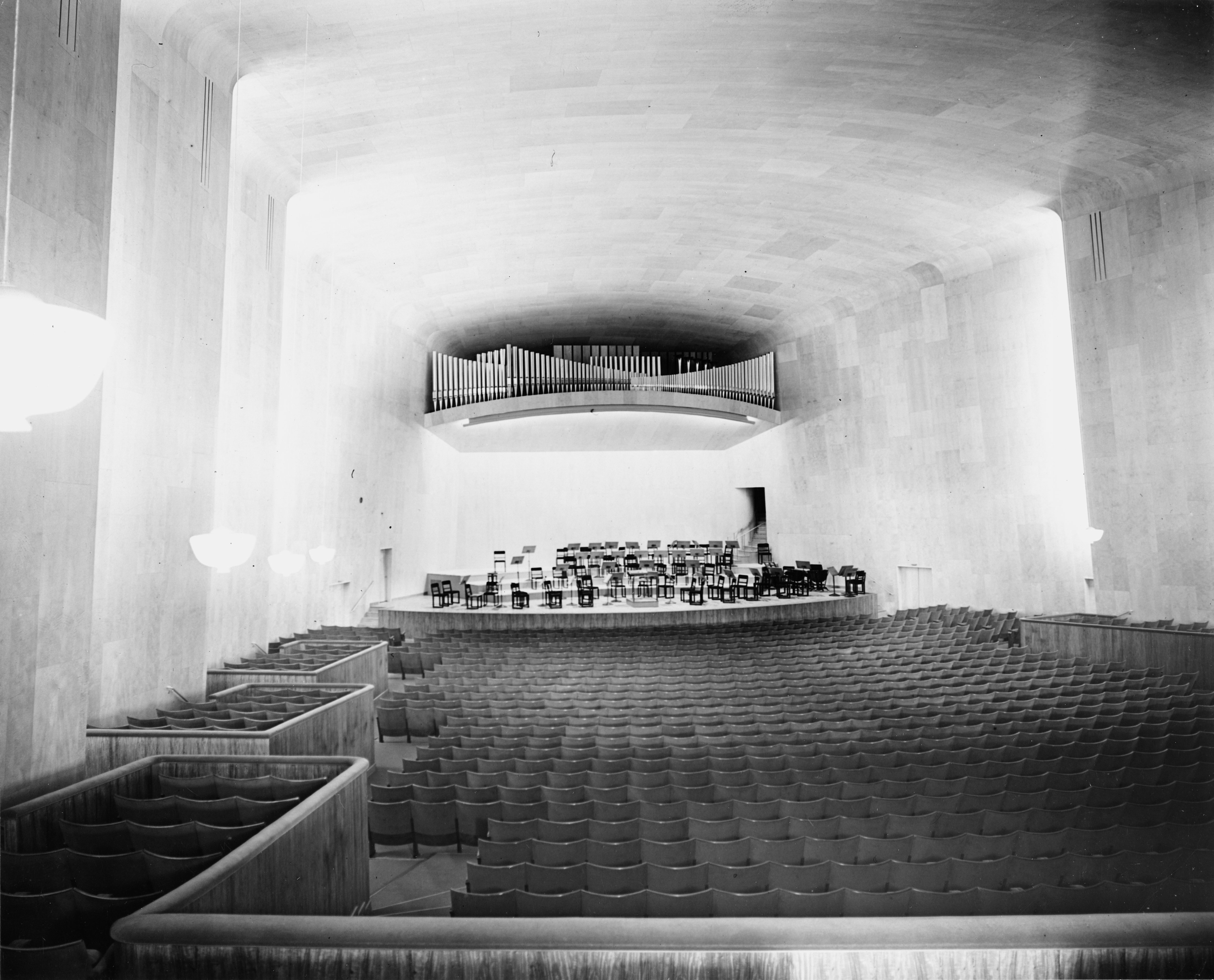
The main auditorium.

Gothenburg Concert Hall (Swedish: Göteborgs konserthus) is a concert hall located in Gothenburg, Sweden, built in 1935. The architect for the facility was Nils Einar Ericsson, a major advocate of Functionalism. However, the Concert Hall has a Neo-Classical exterior look, due to the surrounding area at Götaplatsen where the building is placed—the Art Museum and the City Theatre are solid classically designed buildings as well and were built before the Concert Hall. In contrast to the exterior, the Concert Hall's interior is modernistic.

The main auditorium's plain shaped walls are clad in yellowish-red maple veneer and there are 1,300 seats. There is also a smaller concert hall, Stenhammarsalen, for chamber concerts. The acoustic qualities of Gothenburg Concert Hall have given it a reputation well outside the Swedish borders; Deutsche Grammophon has used the Concert Hall as a studio for a number of records, for example.

A number of progressive rock bands (among others Yes and Roxy Music) have also performed at the Gothenburg Concert Hall.

The Concert Hall is the home stage of the Gothenburg Symphony Orchestra.

== See also ==
- List of concert halls
