= Jasenko Selimović =

Swedish theatre director and politician

Jasenko Selimović MEP
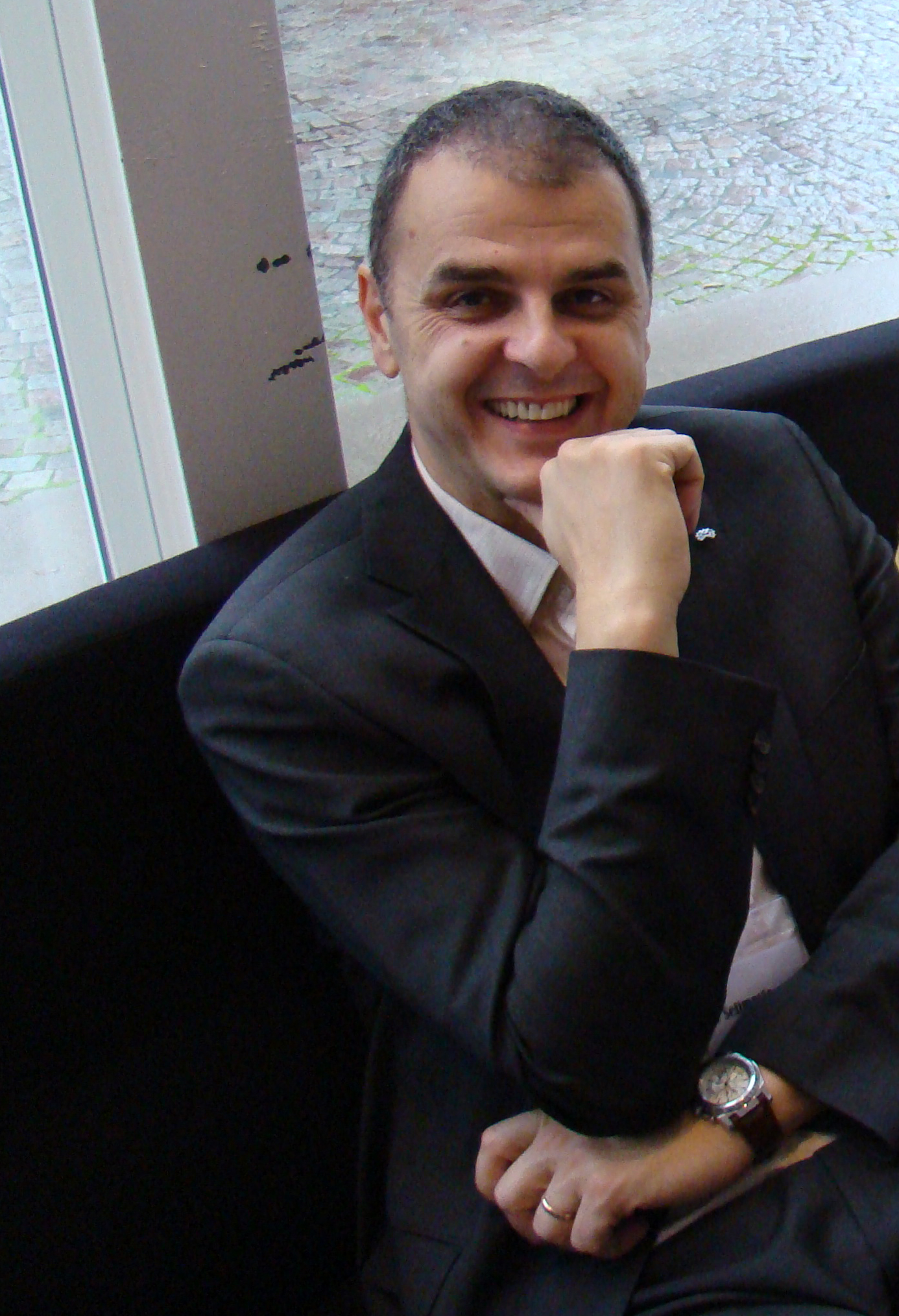

Member of the European Parliament
- In office 30 September 2015 – 2 July 2019
- Preceded by: Marit Paulsen

Personal details
- Born: 1 January 1968 (age 58) Sarajevo, SFR Yugoslavia
- Party: Swedish; Liberal People's Party; EU; ALDE

Jasenko Selimović (born 1 January 1968) is a Bosnian-born Swedish director, artistic director, writer and politician representing the Liberal People's Party. He was a Member of the European Parliament from 2015 until 2019.

== Biography ==
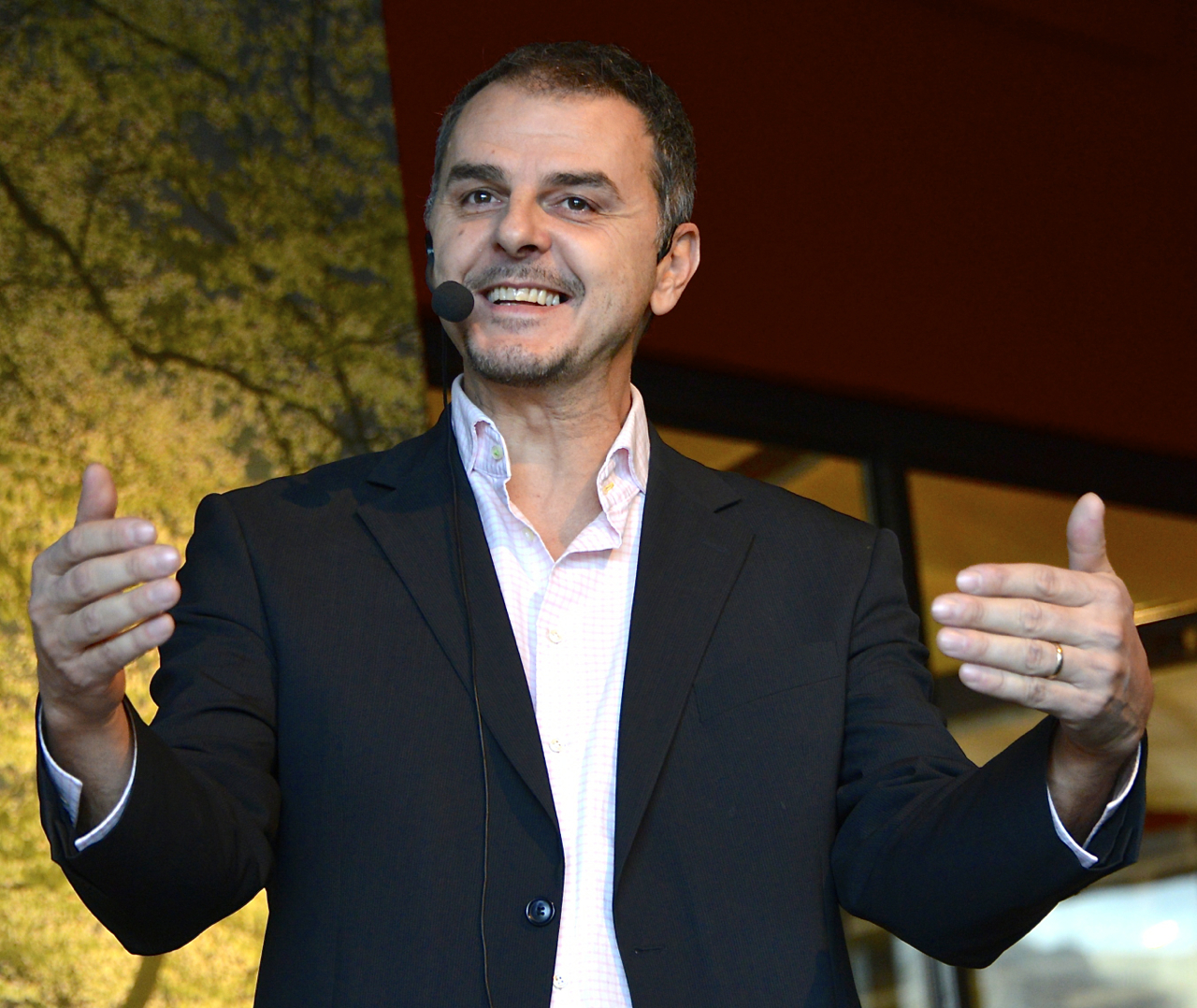
Jasenko Selimović at Stockholm's Kulturhuset on 29 November 2014

=== Theatre ===
Selimović was educated at the academy of creative arts in Sarajevo and at the Dramatic Institute in Stockholm. He fled from the war in Bosnia in 1992. After a period at the Uppsala City Theatre, where he put on the play Pingst (Pentecost), he was engaged as a director at the Gothenburg City Theatre and in 1998 was appointed artistic director. That same year, his play 1948 premiered at Backa Theatre. He put on in 2003 Antigone at the Swedish Royal Dramatic Theatre. In the summer of 2004 he was the host of SVT's talk show Allvarligt talat. He has received a number of theatre prizes, the Svenska Dagbladets Thaliapris in 2000 and Expressens teaterpris in 1997. He was named Gothenburger of the Year in 1999 and European of the Year (Årets Europé) in 2006. He has written columns for the news magazine Fokus. He was director of Sveriges Radio Drama in 2006–09.

=== Politics ===
In September 2009, Selimović announced that he would leave the post of head of the Radioteatern in order to contend the 2010 Swedish general election for the Folkpartiet.

He was nominated for second place in the Liberal Party's parliamentary list for Gothenburg on 16 January 2010 but he did not manage to get into Parliament.

In October 2010 Selimović was appointed Secretary of State for the Integration Minister Erik Ullenhag.

Selimović was a candidate in the European elections in Sweden in 2014 in third place on the Liberal Party list. 30 September 2015, he became an MEP when Marit Paulsen left her seat in the European Parliament. He left his post in July 2019, having decided not to run for re-election.

== Controversies ==
- In 2016, the then EU parliament member Jasenko Selimović was formally reprimanded by EU parliament for harassment of colleagues. Jasenko appealed, but lost in court.
- In 2023, Jasenko Selimović was caught vandalizing two buildings in Stockholm by drawing "Hitlers kuksugare" (Swedish for "Hitler's cocksuckers") on the walls. The buildings were Nationalmuseum and Skeppsholmen Church. During police interrogation and search for motive, the former politician said that he holds "a strong resentment against Sweden".
