= Kungsportsavenyen =

Street in Gothenburg, Sweden

Kungsportsavenyn
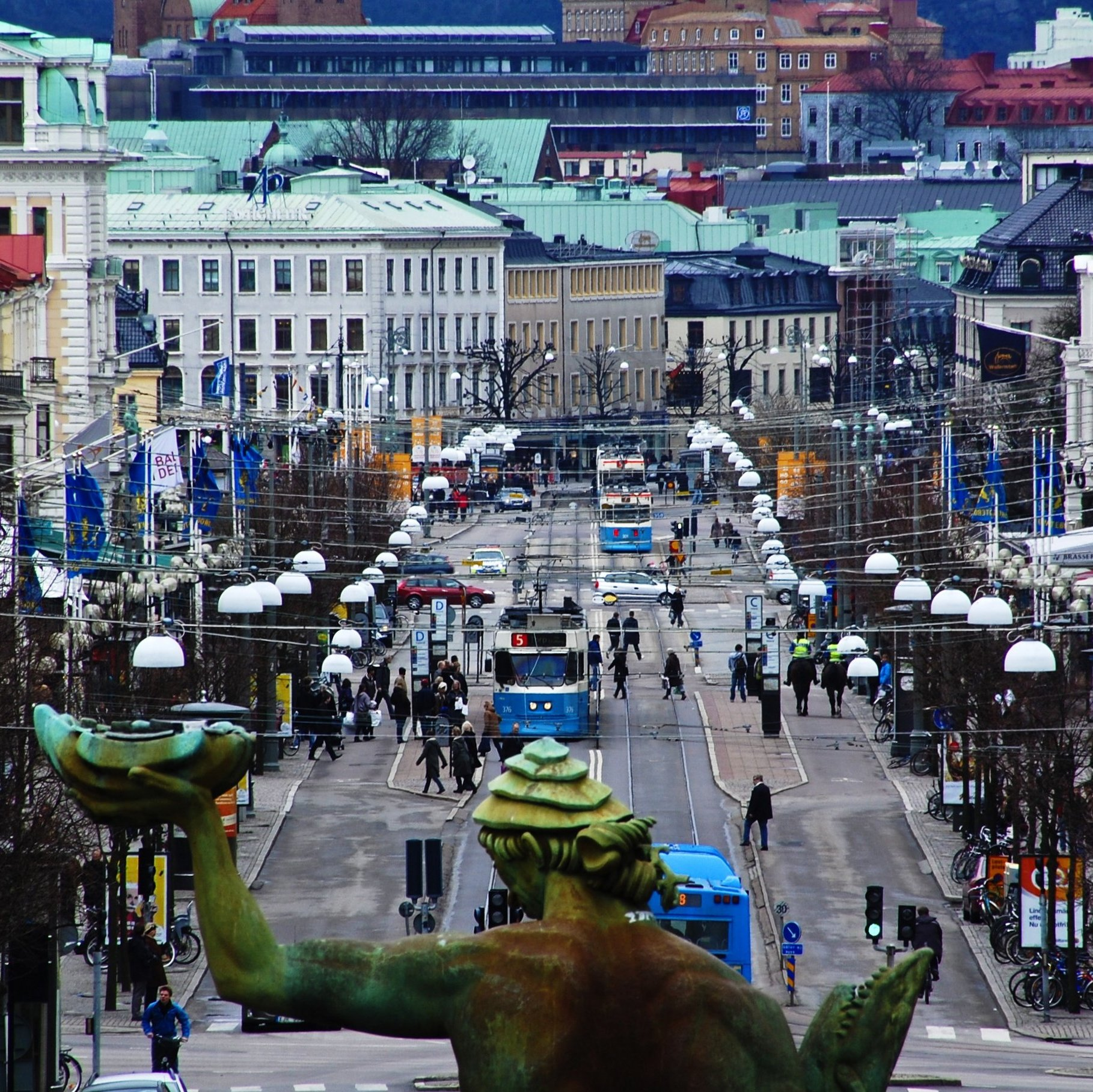
- Kungsportsavenyn viewed from the steps of the Gothenburg Museum of Art, with the Poseidon statue in the foreground
- Interactive map of Kungsportsavenyn
- Length: 840 metres (2,760 ft)
- Width: 40 metres (130 ft)
- Addresses: Kungsportsavenyn 1–45
- Location: Gothenburg, Sweden
- Coordinates: 57°41′51″N 11°58′45″E

Construction
- Commissioned: 1850s
- Construction start: 1860s
- Completion: 1930s

Avenyn (lit. 'The Avenue'), formally Kungsportsavenyen (lit. 'The Kingsgate Avenue'), is the main boulevard of Gothenburg, Sweden. Designed in the mid 19th century as the first middle-class residential district outside the bastions of the fortified heart of the city, the design of Avenyn was inspired by established formal European streets like the Champs-Élysées in Paris and the Ringstraße in Vienna. The layout was the result of an international town planning competition.

With a total length of about 1000 meters, it stretches from Vallgraven ("The Moat") at the edge of the oldest part of Gothenburg, and ends at the Götaplatsen square, where the Gothenburg Museum of Art and other prime cultural institutions are located.

At Vallgraven, it connects to the narrower street Östra Hamngatan (formerly a canal), and the Avenue takes its full name after Kungsporten, the "King's Gate", which was located at the point in the fortifications where Östra Hamngatan ends (see Kungsportsplatsen). The gate and the rest of the fortifications were demolished in the 19th century and replaced by a park.

Initially a residential street for the wealthy businessmen of the city, Avenyn passes the Stora teatern, the Neo-Renaissance theatre and opera building from 1859, and today has a major concentration of pubs, clubs and restaurants.

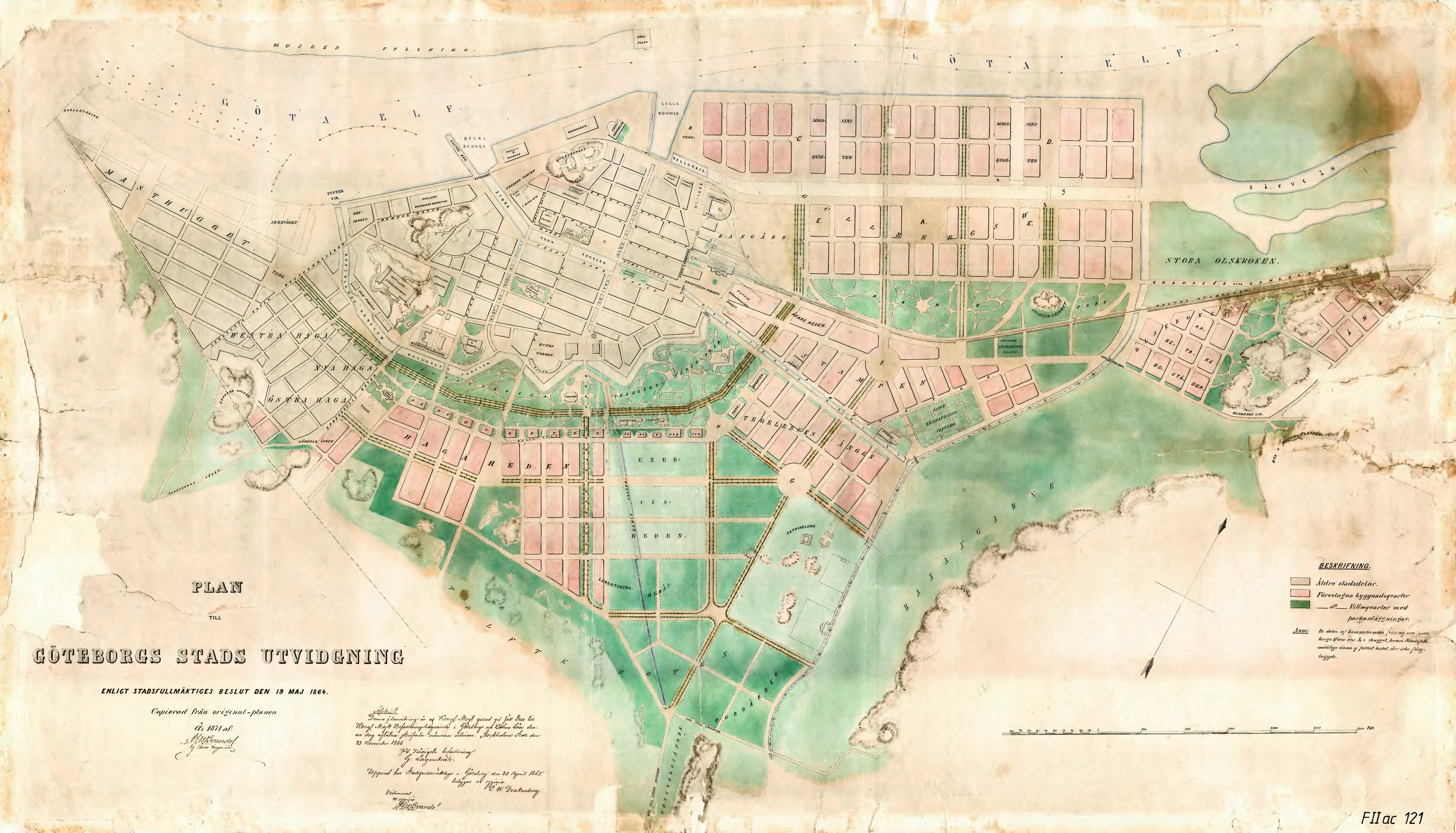
Kungsportsavenyn was an important part of Gothenburg's 1864 city plan
