= Götaplatsen =

Public square in Gothenburg, Sweden

Coordinates: 57°41′49.8″N 11°58′46.5″E

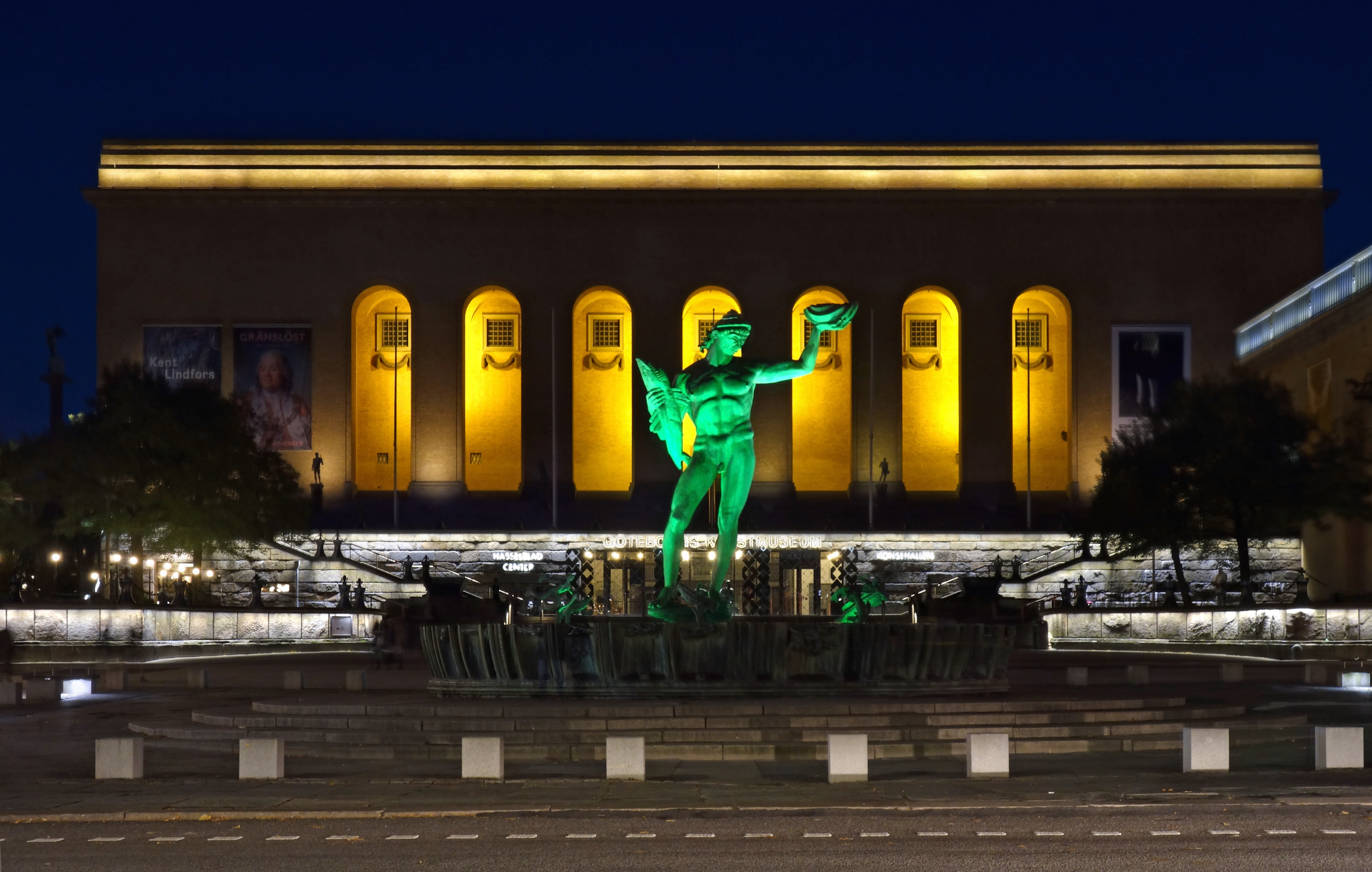
Götaplatsen at night

Götaplatsen is a public square in Gothenburg, Sweden, at the southern end of Avenyn, the city's main boulevard. The square was inaugurated when Gothenburg held a major international industrial exhibition, in 1923, celebrating the city's 300th anniversary.

Götaplatsen is Gothenburg's cultural hub, enclosed by the Gothenburg Concert Hall (where the Gothenburg Symphony Orchestra resides), the Gothenburg Museum of Art, the Gothenburg City Theatre and the City Library. At the centre of the square presides the Poseidon statue by Carl Milles—the statue has become one of the symbols of the city. On the city's annual culture festival different Swedish musical artists usually perform free at the square, bands like Hardcore Superstar, Mustasch and Teddybears have all performed on this occasion.

== History ==
Götaplatsen got its name in 1914, but until 1923 the area was strictly rural. Götaplatsen was designed by the architects Sigfrid Ericson and Arvid Bjerke and construction began in 1921. The Gothenburg Museum of Art was completed just in time before Gothenburg's 300th anniversary in 1923, the Gothenburg Exhibition.

Much of the southern part of Götaplatsen is terraced in stone with wide stairs leading up to the Gothenburg Museum of Art's seven high arches. Until the 1980s, the Museum of Art's entrance was positioned at the top of the archway. Today however, the entrance has been moved a number of levels further down, closer to the street level, where the Hasselblad Centre is also located.

Across the gallery, which is located as a side-house to the Gothenburg Museum of Art at Götaplatsen's southeastern corner, stood a triumphal arch which was the entrance to the exhibition area during the Gothenburg Exhibition. This triumphal arch was demolished in 1928.

The statue was inaugurated on 24 September 1931. The Gothenburg City Theatre was opened on 29 September 1934. The following year, in 1935, the Gothenburg Concert Hall was built on the other side of Götaplatsen.

In 1967, the Gothenburg Public Library was opened. This is next door to Lorensbergsteatern, below the Gothenburg City Theatre across Berzeliigatan.
