= Gothenburg Exhibition =

1923 world's fair held in Sweden

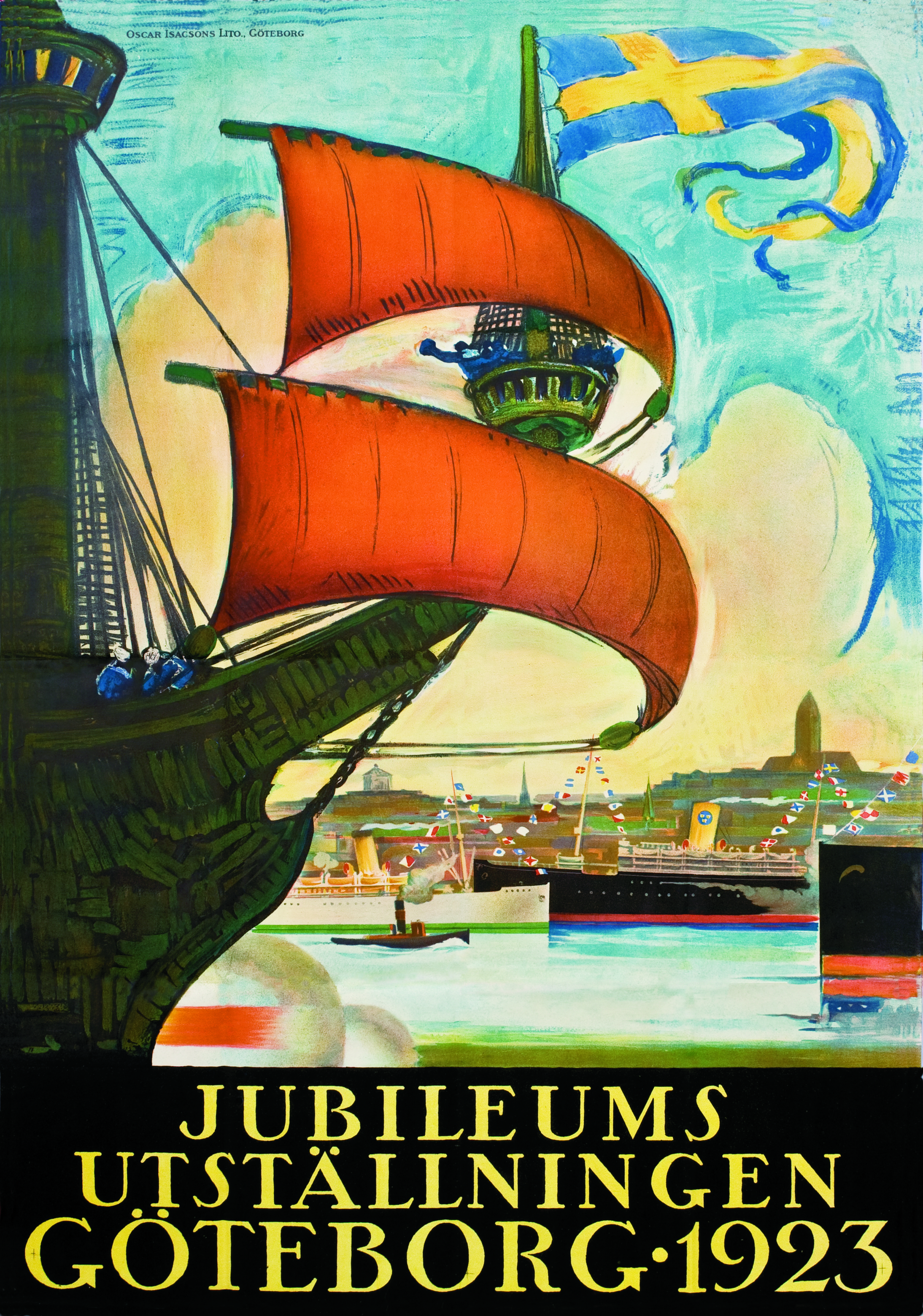
Poster for Gothenburg Exhibition (1923)

The Gothenburg Tercentennial Jubilee Exposition (Swedish: Jubileumsutställningen i Göteborg) was a world's fair held in Gothenburg, Sweden during 1923 marking 300th anniversary of the founding of the city. The fair opened 8 May and ran until 30 September.

== Exhibits and buildings ==
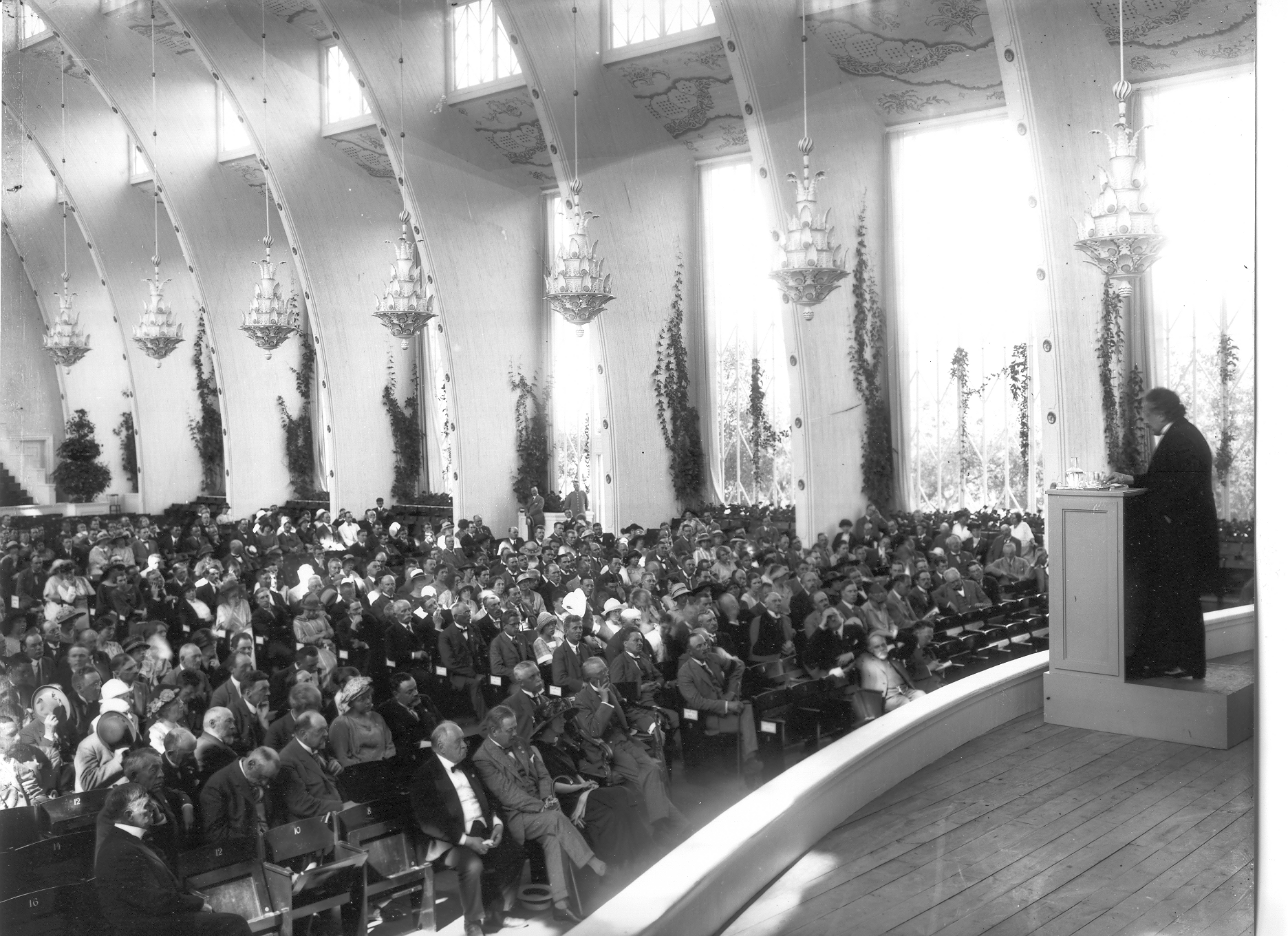
Albert Einstein giving his official Nobel Lecture in the congress hall during the exhibition, after being awarded the 1921 Nobel Prize in Physics.

One site was at Liseberg, an existing gardened area. It was opened to the public for the exhibition, hosted several pavilions, including an industrial art house, an exports exhibition, a congress hall and a machine hall and amusement rides including a carousel.

The Arts and Craft Pavilion was designed by Hakon Ahlberg and the arts exhibition pavilion by architects Sigfrid Ericson (1879-1958) and Arvid Bjerke (1880-1952) . Artist David Wallin had a solo exhibition in here including his paintings Summer and Springtime in the forest.

== Legacy ==
The Liseberg site continued as an amusement park, and is now the most visited tourist attraction in Sweden, receiving 3 million visits annually.

The arts exhibition building is now a contemporary arts gallery, the Göteborgs Konsthall near to the extant Götaplatsen square which was inaugurated for the fair.

== Gallery ==
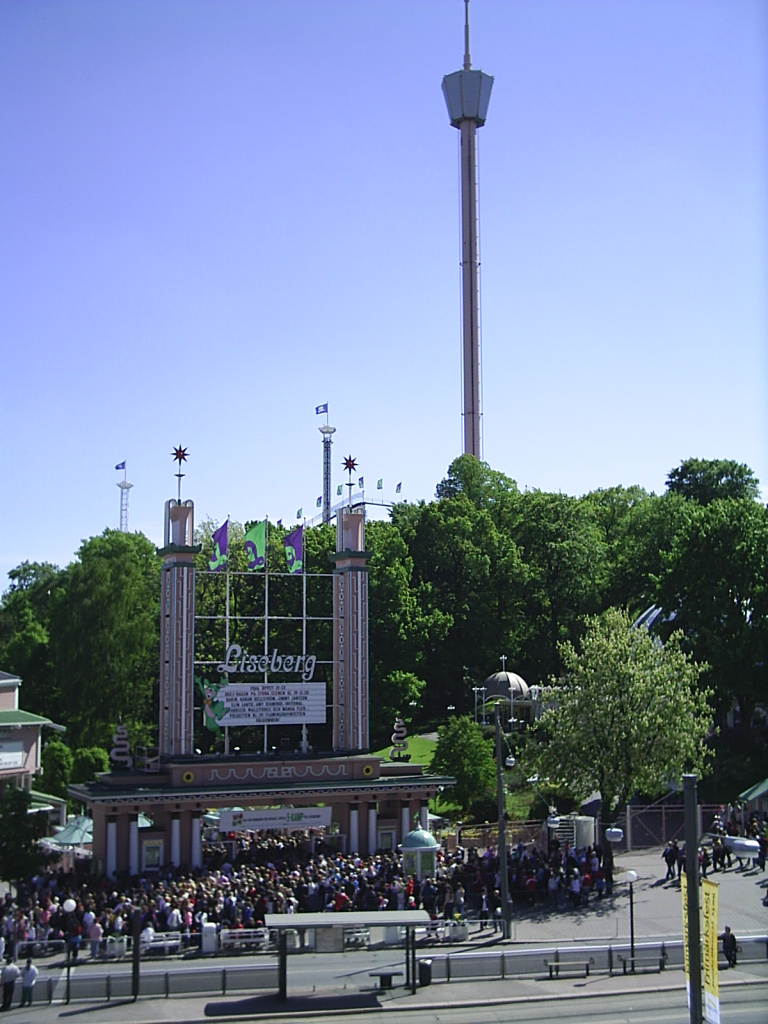
Liseberg entrance

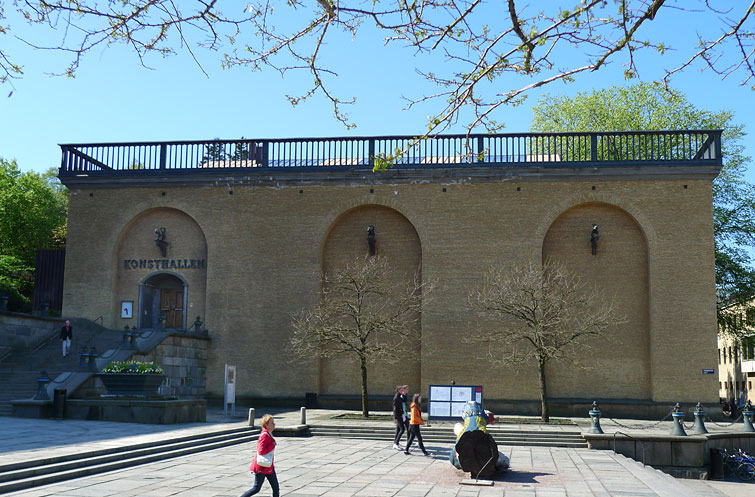
Göteborgs Konsthall

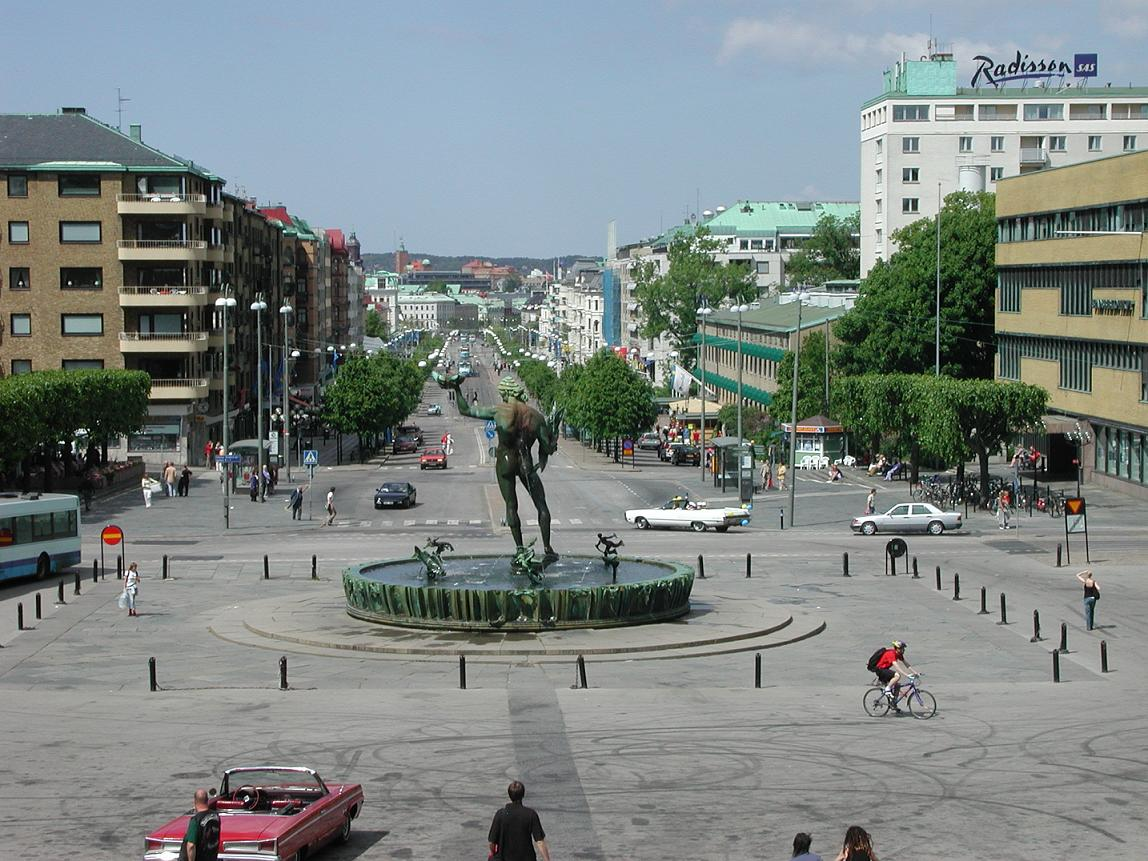
Götaplatsen

== See also ==
- Gothenburg Botanical Garden
- Gothenburg quadricentennial jubilee

== Related reading ==
- Södergren, Arvid (1923) Historiskt kartverk över Göteborg upprättat för jubileumsutställningen i Göteborg (Göteborg: V. Wengelin)
