= Gothenburg City Theatre =

Theatre in Gothenburg, Sweden

Coordinates: 57°41′52.73″N 11°58′48.86″E

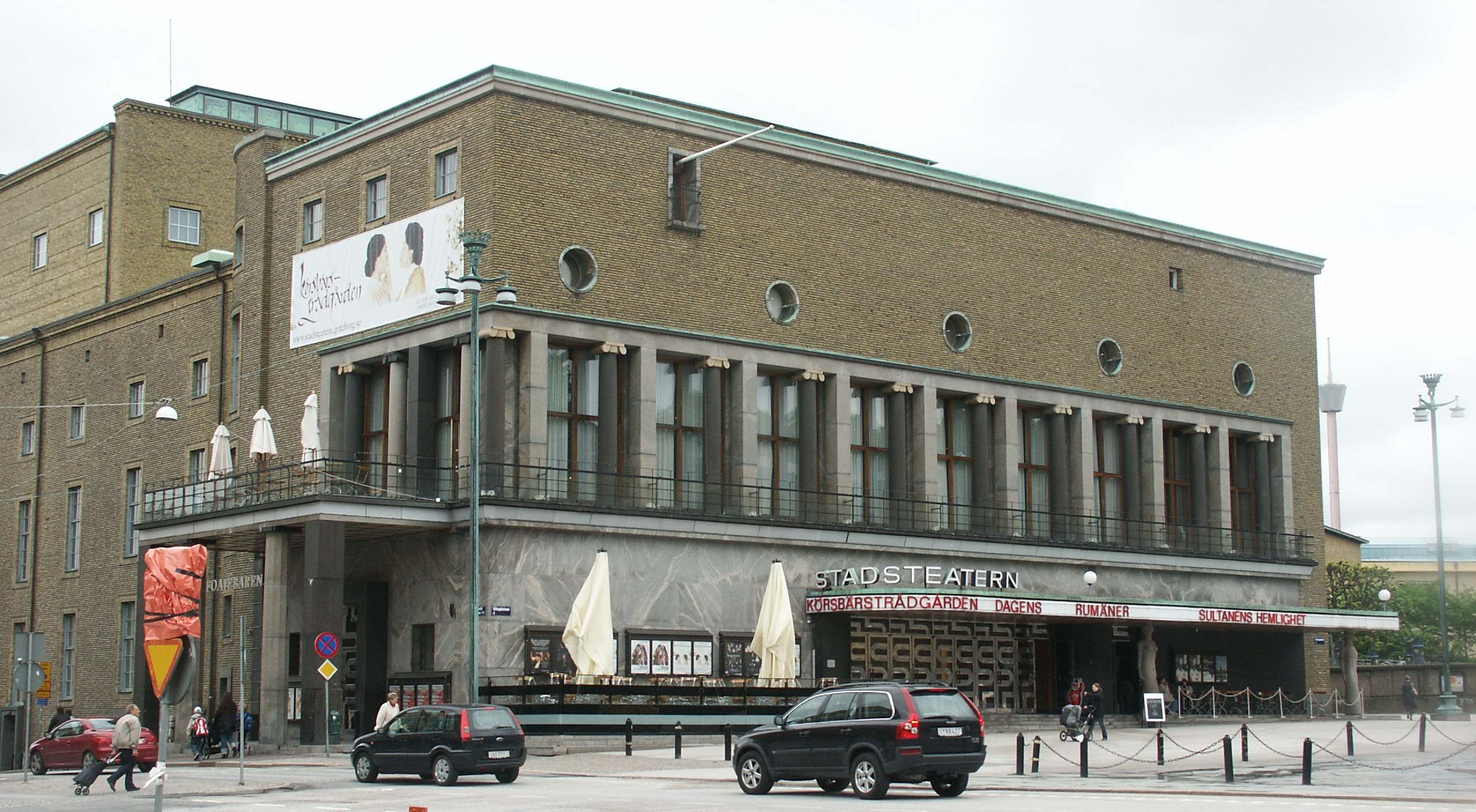
The Gothenburg City Theatre

Gothenburg City Theatre (Swedish: Göteborgs stadsteater) opened in 1934 at Götaplatsen square in Gothenburg, Sweden. The theatre was designed by Swedish architect Carl Bergsten who gave the exterior a Neo-Classical look with a touch of Streamline Moderne. The critics thought it to be a too old-fashioned building – the International Style had had a big breakthrough some years before at the 1930 Stockholm Exhibition. But the interiors of the building pleased the reviewers who thought the auditorium to be "intimate" and “democratic”. The theatre went through a major renovation some years ago and the auditorium was equipped with new technology and with new seats.

The big stage has a capacity of 600 people; there is also a smaller stage called the Studio.

Many of Sweden's well-known actors, directors, writers and designers have worked at the theatre, including Gösta Ekman (senior) and Ingmar Bergman. During the Second World War, Torsten Hammarén made the theatre famous for its anti-Nazi productions.

== Directors ==
- Torsten Hammarén, 1934 to 1950
- Jasenko Selimović, 1996 to 2006
- Anna Takanen, 2006 to 2015
