= Cassation in G major, K. 63 =

Composition by Wolfgang Amadeus Mozart

Cassation in G major
- by W. A. Mozart
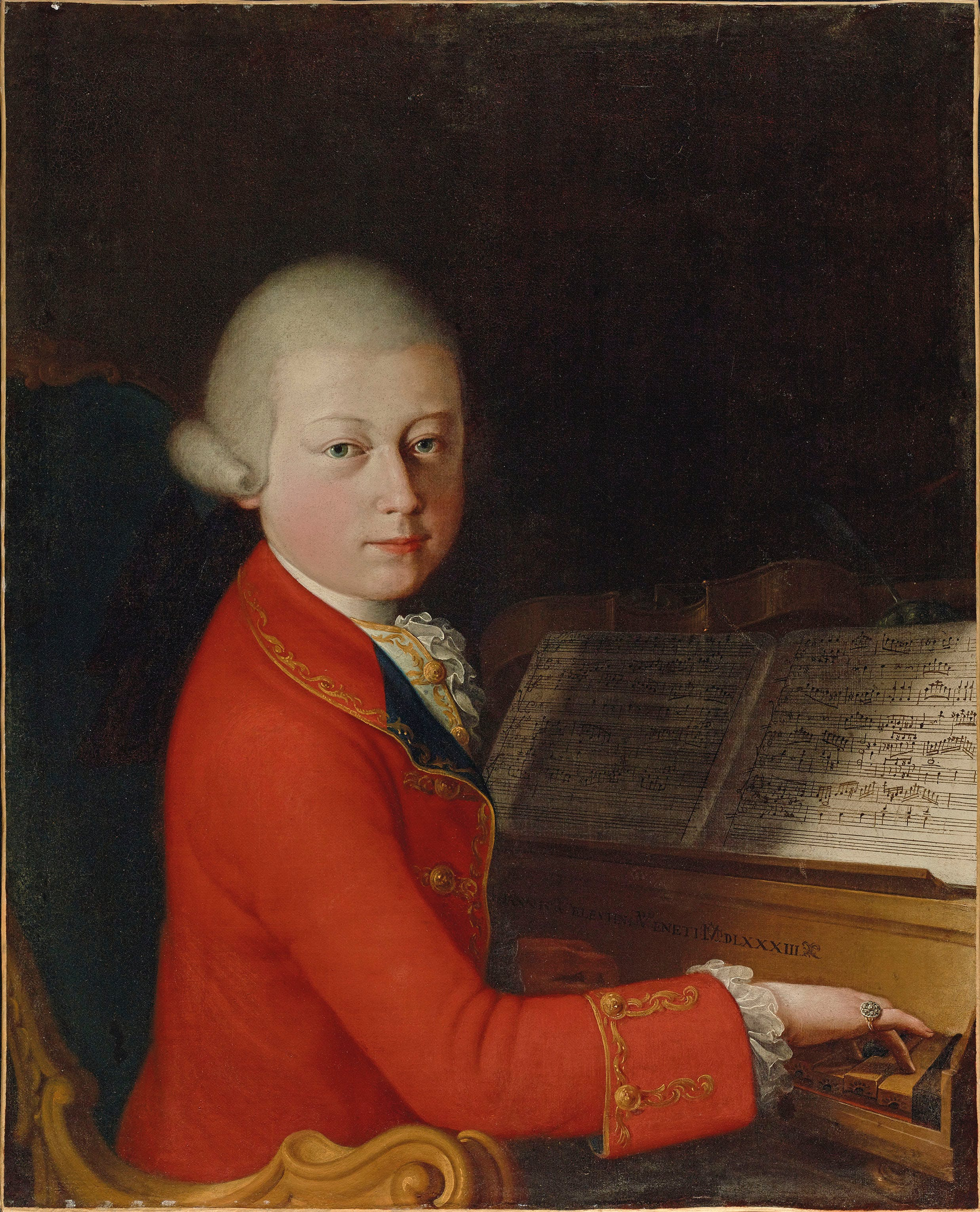
- 1770 Verona portrait of Mozart
- Catalogue: K. 63
- Occasion: End of finals celebration
- Composed: c. 1769
- Dedication: University of Salzburg
- Duration: c. 23 minutes
- Movements: 7
- Scoring: Orchestra

The Cassation in G major, K. 63 is a cassation for orchestra by composed in around 1769 by the then thirteen-year-old Wolfgang Amadeus Mozart, for the celebration of finalists from the University of Salzburg (hence the common title "Finalmusik"). The work is one of three smaller-scale compositions, all written in 1769 (the others being K. 99/63a and 100/62a).

A typical performance would last roughly 23 minutes.

== History ==
The first three of the nine large-scale orchestral serenades that Mozart composed for Salzburg between 1769 and 1779 all date from the former year, when he was thirteen, and none of them bears a title in his own hand. He did, however, in a letter he wrote to Nannerl from Bologna on 4 August 1770, refer to all three (giving the incipits of their introductory marches) as Cassationen—a term whose original meaning in a musical context has never been conclusively explained, although various suggestions have been put forward, most plausibly perhaps as outdoor music (from the contemporary Austrian expression gassatim gehen, i.e. 'to perform in the streets').

Their exact chronology has not been established, but it is known that Finalmusiken by Mozart were performed on 6 and 8 August 1769, for the finalists in Logic and Physic, respectively, and it seems likely that the two works played were K. 63 and K. 99, both modestly scored and in seven movements, including a march. The grander K. 100 was probably written for another festive occasion, perhaps for the Archbishop, later in the summer.

== Scoring and structure ==
The work is scored for strings, two oboes and two horns. It is set in seven movements:

1. Marcia, 2/4 in G major
2. Allegro, 4/4 in G major
3. Andante, 2/4 in C major
4. Menuetto, 3/4 in G major (Trio in G minor)
5. Adagio, 4/4 in D major
6. Menuetto, 3/4 in G major (Trio in C major)
7. Finale: Allegro assai, 6/8 in G major

The work begins with a Marche (the French spelling here and in the fourth and fifth movements is Leopold's) full of busy triplets, and with the second half beginning in the relative minor. This is followed by a dashing Allegro with brilliant and often antiphonal violin parts, and some wide leaps of over an octave; by a gentle Andante (in C) for strings only, with muted violins and pizzicato lower strings (including divided violas); and by a forthright minuet with canonic effects, enclosing a hushed, secretive trio for strings alone, in G minor. The second slow movement, a tender Adagio in D and for strings again, with muted violins and violas (again divided), is the first of many in Mozart's Salzburg serenades in which the principal first violin emerges from the orchestra as a soloist. Next comes another minuet, in a jaunty dotted rhythm, framing a staccato trio in C for strings, with divided violas, and, to end with, a rondo in 6/8 "hunting" rhythm, with a minore episode.

== Recordings ==
Year	Conductor	Orchestra	Label
1954	Ferenc Fricsay	RIAS Symphonie-Orchester Berlin	Deutsche Grammophon
1971	Willi Boskovsky	Wiener Mozart-Ensemble	Decca Records
1985	Jean-François Paillard	Orchestre de Chambre Jean-François Paillard	Erato
1987	Sándor Végh	Camerata Salzburg	Capriccio
1988	Neville Marriner	Academy of St. Martin in the Fields	Philips Records
1989	Paul Sacher	Collegium Musicum Zürich	Jecklin
1992	Harald Nerat	Salzburg Chamber Orchestra	Naxos
2007	Chiara Banchini	Ensemble 415	Zig-Zag Territoires
2007	Sigiswald Kuijken	La Petite Bande	Accent Records
