= Cassation (music) =

Musical genre related to the serenade and divertimento

Cassation is a minor musical genre related to the serenade and divertimento. In the mid- to late 18th century, cassations commonly comprised loosely assembled sets of short movements intended for outdoor performance by orchestral or chamber ensembles. The genre was popular in southern German-speaking lands. Other synonymous titles used by German-speaking composers and cataloguers included Cassatio, Cassatione and Kassation. An equivalent Italian term was Cassazione. The genre is occasionally alluded to in the titles of some twentieth-century compositions.

== Eighteenth-century genre ==
Works titled cassation were especially common in southern Germany, Austria and Bohemia in the mid- to late part of the eighteenth century. Some early works by Joseph Haydn and Wolfgang Amadeus Mozart bear the title cassation; other composers of the classical and pre-classical era who produced cassations include Franz Joseph Aumann, Carl Ditters von Dittersdorf, Michael Haydn, Leopold Hofmann, Antonio Rosetti, Joseph Schmitt, Johannes Sperger and Johann Baptist Wanhal. The Toy Symphony (no known author) was later incorporated into a larger Cassation in G by Leopold Mozart. The Italianized term, cassazione, appears to have been used by Antonio Salieri.

It is hard to discern any substantial formal characteristic that could distinguish cassations from other serenade-like genres, such as the divertimento, notturno, or Finalmusik. (Note: Finalmusik was the performance name given to serenade-like compositions, including cassations, written by Mozart and other composers for the summer graduation ceremonies of the University of Salzburg.) It seems likely that the term cassation was used to refer to the intended social function of the music as outdoor entertainment rather than any particular structural features. Breitkopf's thematic catalogues of the time tended to apply titles such as "cassation" and "divertimento" rather interchangeably, as did the composers themselves. Both Mozart and Michael Haydn seem to have used the term only to refer to orchestral pieces, seemingly resembling the Salzburg serenade while generally lacking concerto movements, whereas Joseph Haydn called his Op. 1 and Op. 2 string quartets "cassations". Instrumental and orchestral cassations seem to be stylistically linked to the divertimento and serenade, respectively. By the end of the eighteenth century, the term had fallen out of fashion.

== Twentieth century usage ==
The term was also sporadically adopted in the twentieth century. Malcolm Williamson composed a series of ten mini-operas involving audience participation (especially aimed at children), which he called "cassations". Cassazione is the title of an orchestral piece in a single movement by Jean Sibelius, and of a string sextet by Riccardo Malipiero.

== Etymology ==
The etymology of the musical term is uncertain. Mozart’s cassations K. 63 and K. 99 open with marches, and the term has been speculatively linked to the Italian word cassa, meaning "drum". Hermann Abert was among those who thought that the term derives from the Italian cassare, meaning "to dismiss", (Note: The legal usage of the term "cassation" (Italian, cassazione) does derive from the equivalent Late-Latin word, cassare.) implying a musical farewell, or Abschiedsmusik. The French word casser (to break) was also invoked, based on the notion that the movements could be freely broken up into any order. A more likely derivation, reflecting the outdoor character of the genre, involves a transformation of the Austrian dialectal word gassatim: specifically, gassatim gehen was an expression commonly used by local eighteenth-century musicians to refer to street performance.
