= Gothenburg Symphony Orchestra =

Symphony orchestra based in Gothenburg, Sweden

- Orchestra
- Native name: Göteborgs Symfoniker
- Short name: GSO
- Founded: 1905
- Concert hall: Gothenburg Concert Hall, Götaplatsen
- Principal conductor: (post vacant)
- Website: www.gso.se

Gothenburg Symphony Orchestra (GSO; Swedish: Göteborgs Symfoniker) is a Swedish symphony orchestra based in Gothenburg. The GSO is resident at the Gothenburg Concert Hall at Götaplatsen. The orchestra received the title of the National Orchestra of Sweden (Swedish: Sveriges nationalorkester) in 1997.

== Background and history ==
The GSO was founded in 1905, with Heinrich Hammer as its first principal conductor. The composer Wilhelm Stenhammar was the orchestra's second principal conductor, from 1907 to 1922. In addition to Stenhammar conducting his own works, Jean Sibelius and Carl Nielsen made regular guest-conducting appearances with the GSO. The orchestra's fortunes waxed and waned in subsequent years, until the advent of Neeme Järvi as principal conductor, from 1982 to 2004. Although the GSO has a broad repertoire, it has a special affinity for the works of the Nordic Late Romantic composers, such as Jean Sibelius and Edvard Grieg. During Järvi's tenure as principal conductor, the longest tenure of any principal conductor in the GSO's history, its reputation on the world stage was greatly increased, including sponsorships from Volvo and a recording contract with Deutsche Grammophon. Järvi currently holds the title of Principal Conductor Emeritus (Chefdirigent Emeritus) with the GSO.

Gustavo Dudamel was principal conductor of the GSO from 2007 to 2012, and now has the title of hedersdirigent (honorary conductor) of the GSO. Past principal guest conductors of the GSO have included Norman del Mar, who was Permanent Guest Conductor from 1968 to 1973, and Christian Zacharias. Kent Nagano became principal guest conductor and artistic advisor of the GSO as of the 2013–2014 season, with an initial contract of three years.

In August 2014, Santtu-Matias Rouvali first guest-conducted the GSO. In May 2016, the GSO announced the appointment of Rouvali as its next chief conductor, effective with the 2017–2018 season, with an initial contract of four years. In May 2019, the GSO announced the extension of Rouvali's contract through 2025. In December 2023, the GSO announced that Rouvali is to stand down as its chief conductor at the close of the 2024–2025 season.

In 2019, Barbara Hannigan became principal guest conductor of the GSO, the first female conductor to be named to the post. Her current GSO contract in this post is through 2028. In October 2024, the GSO announced the appointment of Pekka Kuusisto as its additional principal guest conductor, effective with the 2025–2026 season, to serve alongside Hannigan in the post.

In addition to Deutsche Grammophon, the orchestra has recorded commercially for such labels as BIS.

== Discography ==
=== Studio albums ===
Year	Album details
1995	Swedish Bassoon Concertos: Release date: 24 January 1995; Label: Intim Musik
1999	Grieg: Piano Concerto; Peer Gynt Suites 1 & 2: Release date: 8 January 1999; Label: Deutsche Grammophon
2002	Miaskovsky: Symphony No. 6: Release date: 12 November 2002; Label: Deutsche Grammophon
2012	Sibelius: Symphonies Nos. 5 & 7; Karelia Suite: Release date: 23 April 2012; Label: Decca Records, Deutsche Grammophon

== Principal Conductors ==
- Heinrich Hammer (1905–1907)
- Wilhelm Stenhammar (1907–1922)
- Ture Rangström (1922–1925)
- Tor Mann (1925–1939)
- Issay Dobrowen (1941–1953)
- Dean Dixon (1953–1960)
- Sten Frykberg (1960–1967)
- Sergiu Comissiona (1967–1973)
- Sixten Ehrling (1974–1976)
- Charles Dutoit (1976–1979)
- Neeme Järvi (1982–2004)
- Mario Venzago (2004–2007)
- Gustavo Dudamel (2007–2012)
- Santtu-Matias Rouvali (2017–2025)

== Selected Premieres ==
- Hilding Hallnäs: Symphonies Nos. 1 (1945), 2 (1948), 3 (1948), 4 (1952), and 5 (1963)
- Gösta Nystroem: Symphonies Nos. 1 (1932), 2 (1937), and 4 (1952)
- Wilhelm Peterson-Berger: Symphony No. 2 (1911)
- Allan Pettersson: Symphonies Nos. 3 (1956), 9 (1971)
- Hilding Rosenberg: Tre Fantasistycken (1919), Symphony No. 1 (1921), Piano Concerto (1951)
- Eduard Tubin: Symphony No. 11 (1989)
- Benjamin Staern: Jubilate (2009)

== See also ==
- Music of Sweden
- Gothenburg Opera

== Sources ==
- Pâris, Alain, ed. (1995). Dictionnaire des interprètes et de l'interprétation musicale au XXe siècle. Paris: R. Laffont. ISBN 2-221-08064-5.
