= Kullabergs Vineyard =

Kullabergs vingård is a vineyard located in Höganäs Municipality, Skåne County, Sweden Kullabergs vingård produces wine, cider and distillates from estate grown grapes and fruit. The property is a part of the Balderup estate. Winemakers are Helena Lindberg and Nicola Dágostini. The oldest field is 2 ha big, planted in 2006, containing the varieties Solaris, Regent and Rondo. In 2017, 7 ha were planted with Solaris and the new varieties Souvignier gris, Muscaris and Donauriesling. During 2019 a further 4 ha were planted with blue varieties Pinot Nova and Cabernet Noir. They currently have a total of 22 ha fields and continue to grow. The vineyard is entirely planted with fungi resistant so-called PIWI varieties allowing sustainable viticulture without pesticides and herbicides. In Sweden, the products are sold through Systembolaget.

== See also ==
- Swedish wine
- Kullahalvön
