= Ladonia (micronation) =

Art project micronation in Europe

Coordinates: 56°17′16″N 12°32′22″E

- Micronation (unrecognized entity)
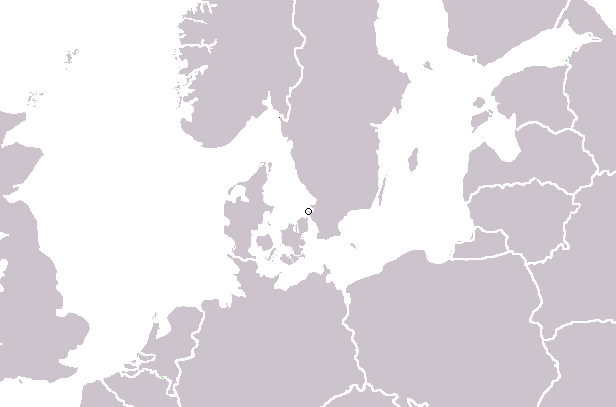
- Location of Ladonia
- Location: Kullaberg, Sweden
- Area claimed: 1 km^{2} (0.39 sq mi)
- Claimed by: Lars Vilks
- Dates claimed: 2 June 1996–present

Ladonia (Swedish: Ladonien) is a micronation, proclaimed in 1996 as the result of a years-long court battle between artist Lars Vilks and local authorities over two sculptures. The claimed territory is part of the natural reserve of Kullaberg in southern Sweden. The Ladonian language consists of two words, “waaaaalll” and “ÿp”.

== History ==
In 1980, artist Lars Vilks began construction of two sculptures, Nimis (Latin for "too much", a structure made of 75 tonnes of driftwood) and Arx (Latin for "fortress", a structure made of stone), in the Kullaberg nature reserve in north-west Skåne, Sweden. The location of the sculptures is difficult to reach, and as a consequence they were not discovered for two years, at which point the local council declared the sculptures to be buildings, the construction of which was forbidden on the nature reserve, and demanded that they should be dismantled and removed. Despite the confrontations with the local council, a large percentage of the local community supports the sculptures, especially people working in the tourism industry.

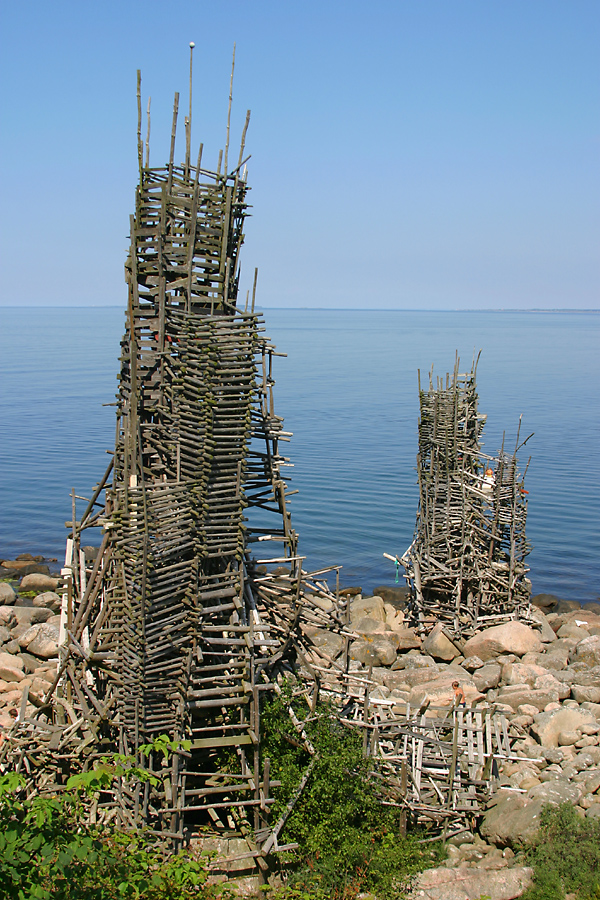
Nimis

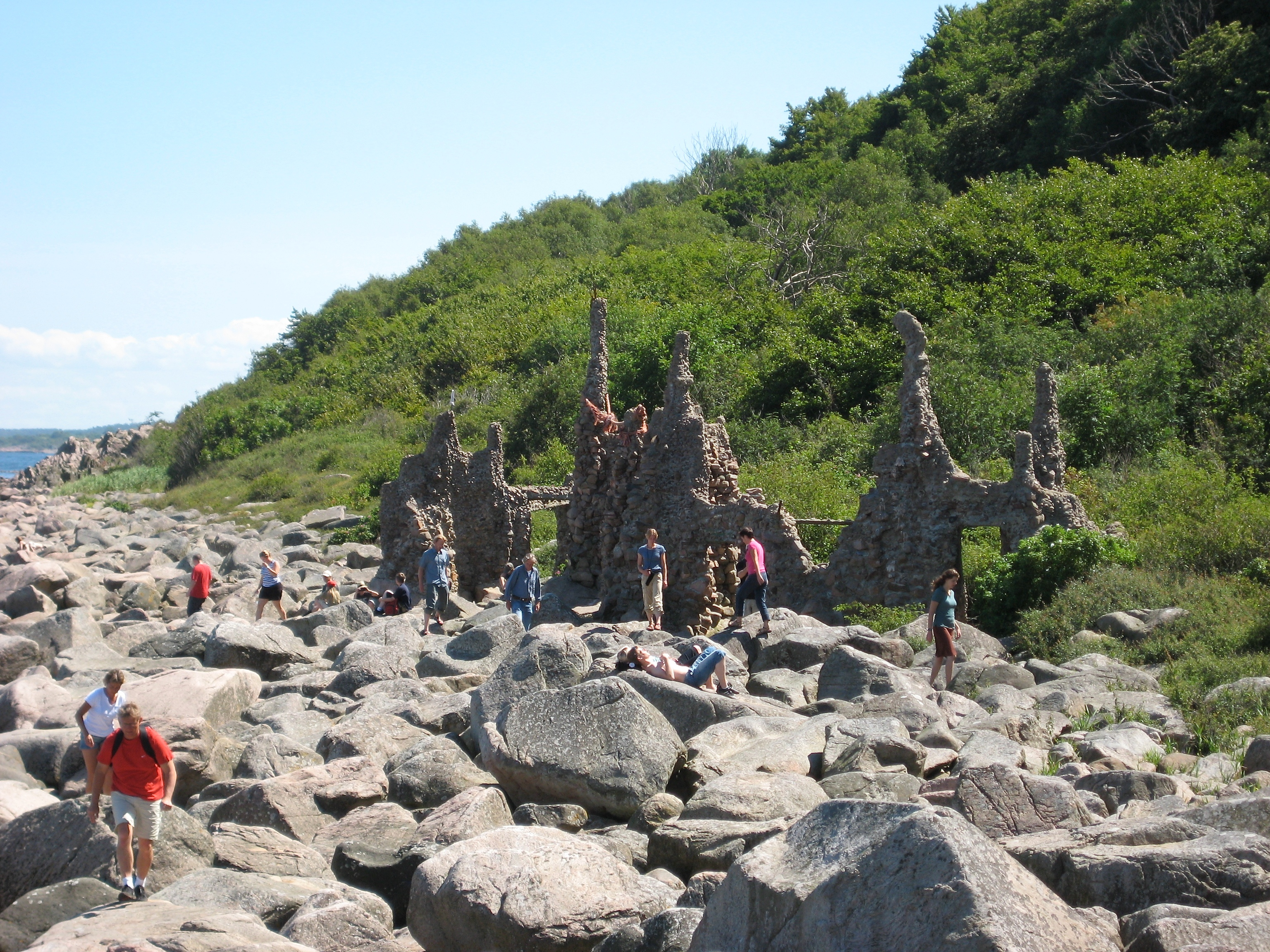
Arx

Vilks appealed the decision of the council, but lost. He appealed repeatedly, and finally the case was settled, in the council's favour, by the Swedish government. However, in the meantime Nimis had been bought from Vilks by the artists Christo and Jeanne-Claude after the death of Joseph Beuys, who bought it in 1984. On 2 June 1996, in protest of the local council, Vilks declared the area surrounding Nimis an independent, sovereign country named Ladonia.

In 1999, another sculpture, Omphalos (named after Omphalos, a small sculpture in the temple at Delphi, "marking the centre of the world"), was created. It was made of stone and concrete, 1.61 metres high and weighing a tonne. The Gyllenstiernska Krapperup Foundation, formed to promote art and culture, accused Vilks of building this sculpture and complained to the police, and in August 1999 the district court ordered its removal. The Foundation had also demanded the removal of Nimis and Arx, but the court ruled against it. The Foundation appealed this decision to the Supreme Court, who eventually ruled against it. The police were unable to positively identify Vilks as the sculptor, but the district court held that he was.

The removal of Omphalos was itself controversial. Vilks was ordered to find an acceptable way to remove the sculpture. He proposed blowing it up on 10 December 2001, Nobel Day and the 100th anniversary of the Nobel Prize, and applied to the county council for permission to do so. The county council made a decision on 7 December, but kept it secret until 10 December. By that time, another artist, Ernst Billgren, had bought Omphalos from Vilks, and had requested that it not be damaged. In the early hours of 9 December, a crane boat was sent (by DYKMA, under contract from the Enforcement Administration) to the site and removed the sculpture (at a cost of SEK 92,500, billed to Vilks). Despite the new owner's request, the sculpture was damaged by handling. In response to this, the Enforcement Administration was satirically declared to be "Performance Artist of the Year" in 2002.

Afterwards, Vilks applied to the county council again, this time for permission to erect a memorial in the place that Omphalos had stood. Permission was granted by the council to erect a monument no greater than 8 centimetres high. This was duly done, and the monument was inaugurated on 27 February 2002.

The ensemble Neurobash performed in Ladonia during the 10th Anniversary celebrations in 2006.

In August 2022, it was announced that Ladonia would be hosting MicroCon 2023 in Chicago, Illinois and in Ypres, Belgium.

== Government ==
The flag of Ladonia, a green Nordic cross on a green background. (outlines are permitted on non-physical flags; physical flags use two distinct pieces of fabric)

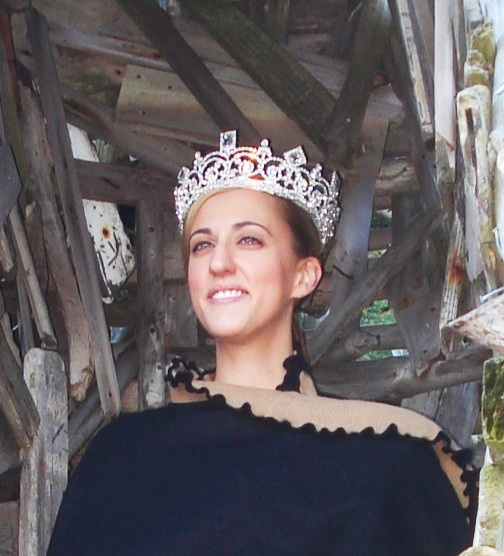
Queen Carolyn of Ladonia immediately after her coronation. 19 September 2011

The government of Ladonia is jointly led by a queen and a president. The president and vice-president are elected tri-annually, while the queen, once crowned, reigns for life. As of 2018 the position of president is held by interim-president The President's Old Shoes, and the vice-president position is vacant, pending new elections in 2019. Vilks, the State Secretary, performs or oversees many of the day-to-day operations of the microstate, including processing new citizenship applications and posting photos and news items to the Ladonian online "newspaper". The cabinet ministers are the legislative body in Ladonia, and they participate in debates and vote on proposals via the Internet. Many Ladonian ministries have artistic connotations and whimsical names. As of 2018 the Cabinet of Ladonia has voted to amend the constitution to create the position of prime minister. The PM candidates will be nominated by and selected from current members of the Cabinet. The amendment abolishes the positions of president and vice-president. This move was made as a way to prevent the election fraud that occurred in the previous election.

Regarding diplomacy of Ladonia's government the following can be noted. In 2008 the Ladonia Herald announced, through Vilks, that Ladonia recognized KREV, Tibet, the Bjorn Socialist Republic (another Swedish micronation, which recognizes Ladonia), Lakota nation, South Korea and universally recognized countries like, inter alia, Italy, Russia and United States. Regarding Sweden the "Ladonia has de facto recognized this country as 1) we are at war with Sweden, and 2) we have a consulate and have had an ambassador". Still, Ladonia did not believe that Sweden "really exists" as it "has never been proclaimed".

== Demographics ==
When it was created, Ladonia had no population. As of 2020, there are 22,858 Ladonian citizens from more than 50 countries. None of the citizens resides within Ladonia's borders, although there has been at least one resident citizen in the past.

A comparison can be drawn between Ladonia accepting online citizenship applications and the e-Residency of Estonia. This virtual residency program shows how established nations may also adopt similar strategies to micronations, providing an example of what citizenship might look like in postnationalism. According to the Höganas Visitors Bureau, about 40,000 people visit Ladonia each year.

== Nimis ==
Nimis is a series of wooden sculptures situated along the coast in the Kullaberg Nature Reserve, Höganäs Municipality, in the northern part of Skåne County, Sweden. They are a massive, wooden labyrinthine structure connected by several wooden towers, and are said to be mostly constructed from driftwood.

They were begun by the artist Lars Vilks in 1980 and have been the subject of a long-running legal dispute between the Swedish authorities and the artist. As no permission was given to build on the site within the nature reserve, the County Administrative Board in Skåne has sought to have Nimis demolished, despite the fact that it has become a popular tourist attraction.

As Nimis's existence is not sanctioned by Sweden, it is difficult to find – there are no official sign posts in Sweden, nor is it marked on maps. However, it can be found on Google Maps. It lies a few kilometres northwest of the town of Arild and somewhat farther from the town of Mölle, and can only be reached on foot following a well-worn path with yellow Ns painted on trees and fences. The path begins as an easy stroll past Himmelstorp, a well-preserved eighteenth-century farmstead, but quickly becomes a steep and rocky climb down to the coast. Reportedly, thousands of local and international tourists visit Nimis each year, especially during summer.

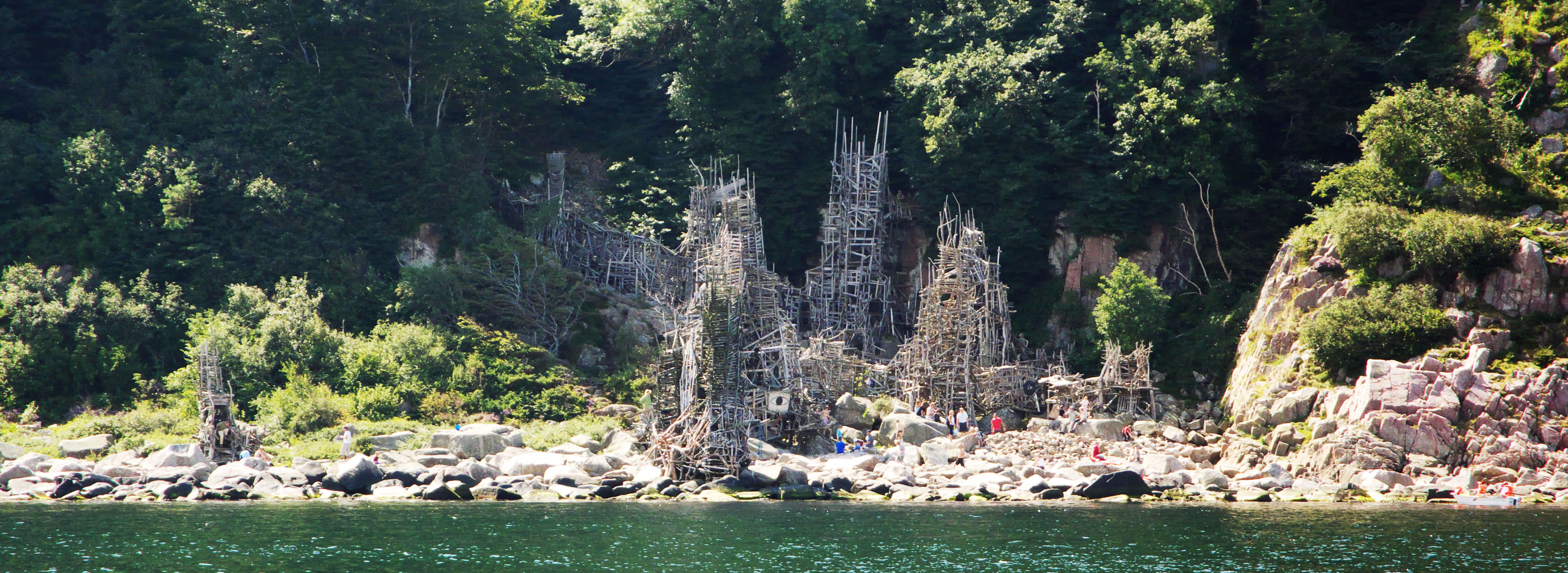
Nimis as seen from the bay

== Sources ==
- "Omphalos". Moderna Museet. Archived from the original on 27 September 2007.
- "Filippa Kihlborg in Ladonia".
- "Visa for Ladonia". The Power of Culture. 3 April 2002. Archived from the original on 27 September 2007.
- "Pakistanis' 'new life' in imaginary country". BBC News. 11 March 2002.
- TT Spektra (3 July 2006). "Påhittat land fyller tio år". Svenska Dagbladet (in Swedish). Archived from the original on 20 May 2007.
- Truc Olivier (14 March 2002). "Le pays virtuel qui attire 3000 réfugiés". Libération (in French). Archived from the original on 19 August 2012.
