= Kullen Lighthouse =

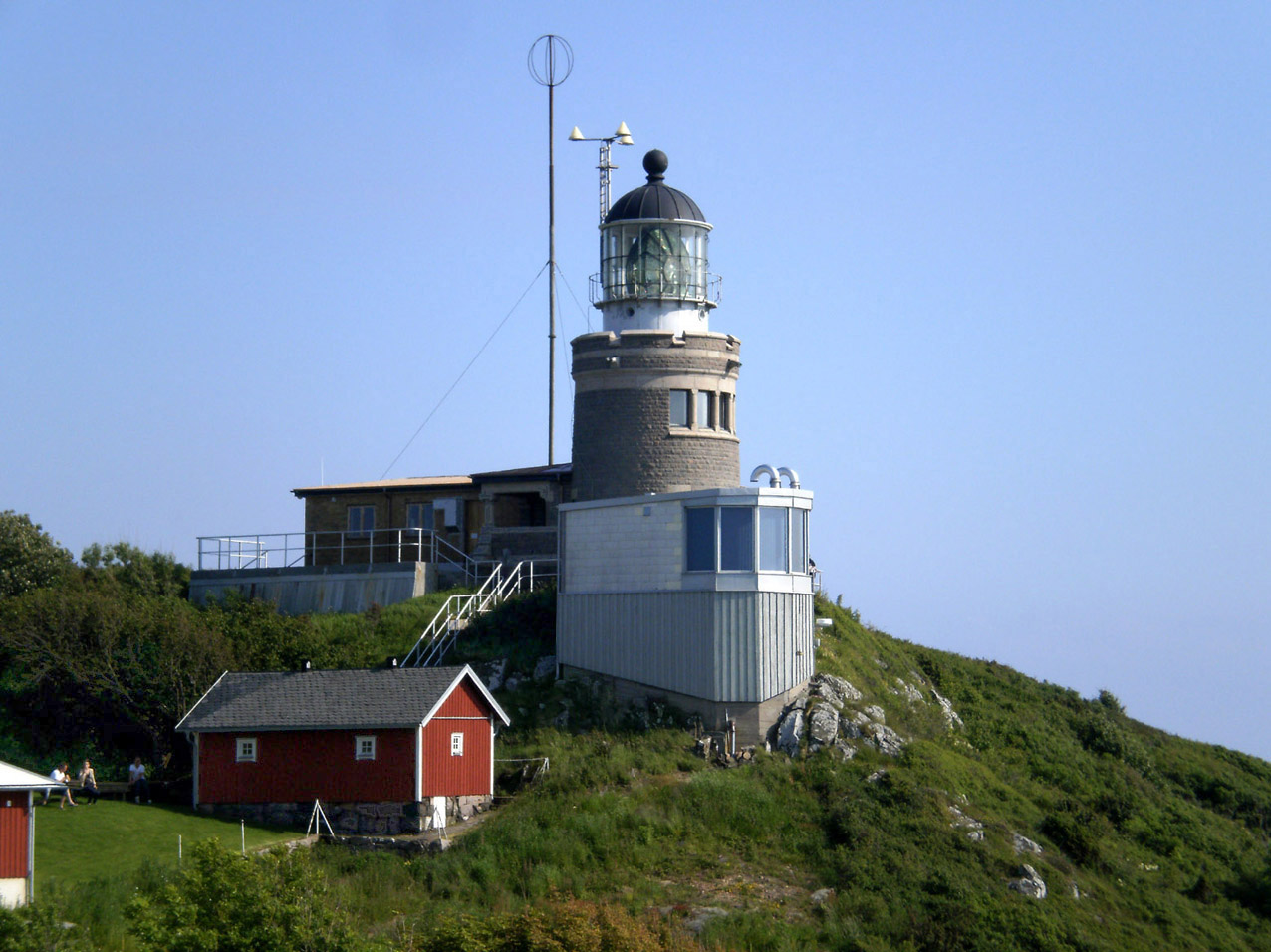
- Kullen Lighthouse
- Location: Kullaberg; Kattegatt; Sweden
- Coordinates: 56°18′04.0″N 12°27′05.4″E

Tower
- Constructed: 1563 (first); 1585 (second); 1749 (third); 1792 (fourth); 1843 (fifth)
- Construction: granite and brick tower
- Automated: 1979
- Height: 18.5 metres (61 ft)
- Shape: cylindrical tower with balcony and lantern attached to a 2-storey building
- Markings: grey unpainted stone tower, white lantern, black lantern dome
- Power source: kerosene, electricity
- Operator: Kullens Fyr
- Heritage: governmental listed building, governmental listed building complex
- Fog signal: (2) 30 s

Light
- First lit: 1898-1900 (Magnus Dahlander) (current)
- Focal height: 78.5 metres (258 ft)
- Lens: 1st order clamshell Fresnel lens
- Intensity: 1 kW
- Range: 24.5 nautical miles (45.4 km; 28.2 mi)
- Characteristic: Fl W 5 s
- Sweden no.: SV-7146

The Kullen Lighthouse (Swedish: Kullens fyr) is an operational lighthouse in Scania, located by the mouth of Öresund, at the point of Kullaberg peninsula, in Höganäs, on the south-west coast of Sweden. Kullen is one of the most prominent landmarks along the Swedish coastline, and with its 1000 Watt electric bulb in a huge lenshouse, also the most powerful lighthouse in Scandinavia, overlooking one of the world's most heavily traveled waters.

The lighthouse is 15 meters tall and its focal plane is located 78.5 meters above sea level making it the highest located lighthouse in Sweden. Every 5 seconds, the Kullen Lighthouse flashes white for 0.3 seconds with 27 nautical miles reach.

== History ==
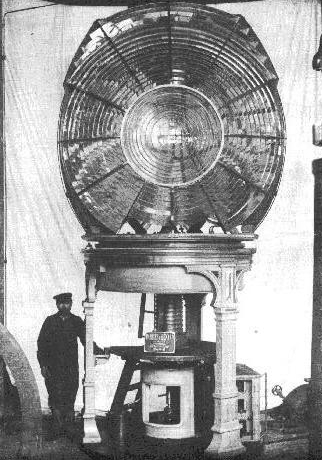
The lens assembly at the Kullen lighthouse, the most powerful lighthouse in Scandinavia.

Kullen is the oldest lighthouse location in Scandinavia founded 1561 by the Danish king Fredrik II

This lighthouse was a "Parrot lighthouse" with an iron casket 20 feet above ground.

1563 there was a new stone tower with 12 candlelight as source for light but already 1585 it was replaced with a covered lantern and from 1624 coal was used for light.

During the centuries wood, candlelights, coal, oil, kerosene and electricity have been used to send out a beam that reached 50K as a minimum.

The present lighthouse is built in stone and brick and has three large 1 order Fresnel lenses in a lens house that rotates four times per minute, hence giving twelve flashes per minute. Based on Augustin-Jean Fresnel's design, the lens house was constructed by the French company Barbier & Barnard and delivered in the summer of 1900. It consists of three lenses of 2.58 m in diameter, weighs 6 metric tons and originally rotated on a base filled with 50 liters of mercury. The mercury was replaced in September 2016 with two bearings. The Kullen lighthouse was automated in 1979 and is remote-controlled by the Swedish Maritime Administration's check at Norrköping. The last keeper left in 1996.

== Area setting ==
The Kullen Lighthouse is situated within the Kullaberg Nature Reserve, a cliff and forest habitat for a variety of rare species, criss-crossed by numerous hiking trails. Approximately three kilometers to the southeast is the harbour town of Mölle.

== See also ==
- List of lighthouses and lightvessels in Sweden
