= Balderup =

Coordinates: 56°16′17″N 12°33′44″E

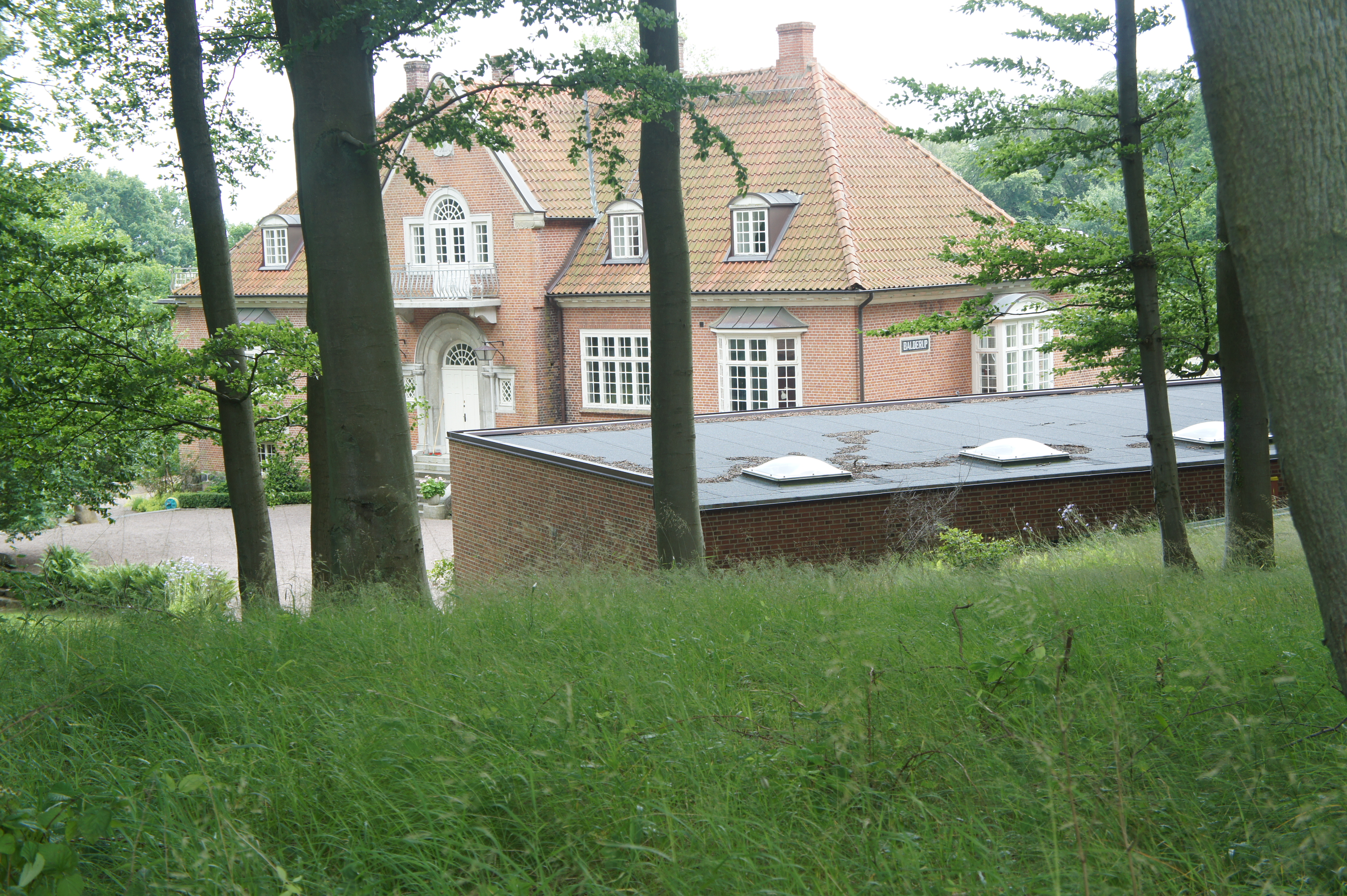
Balderup

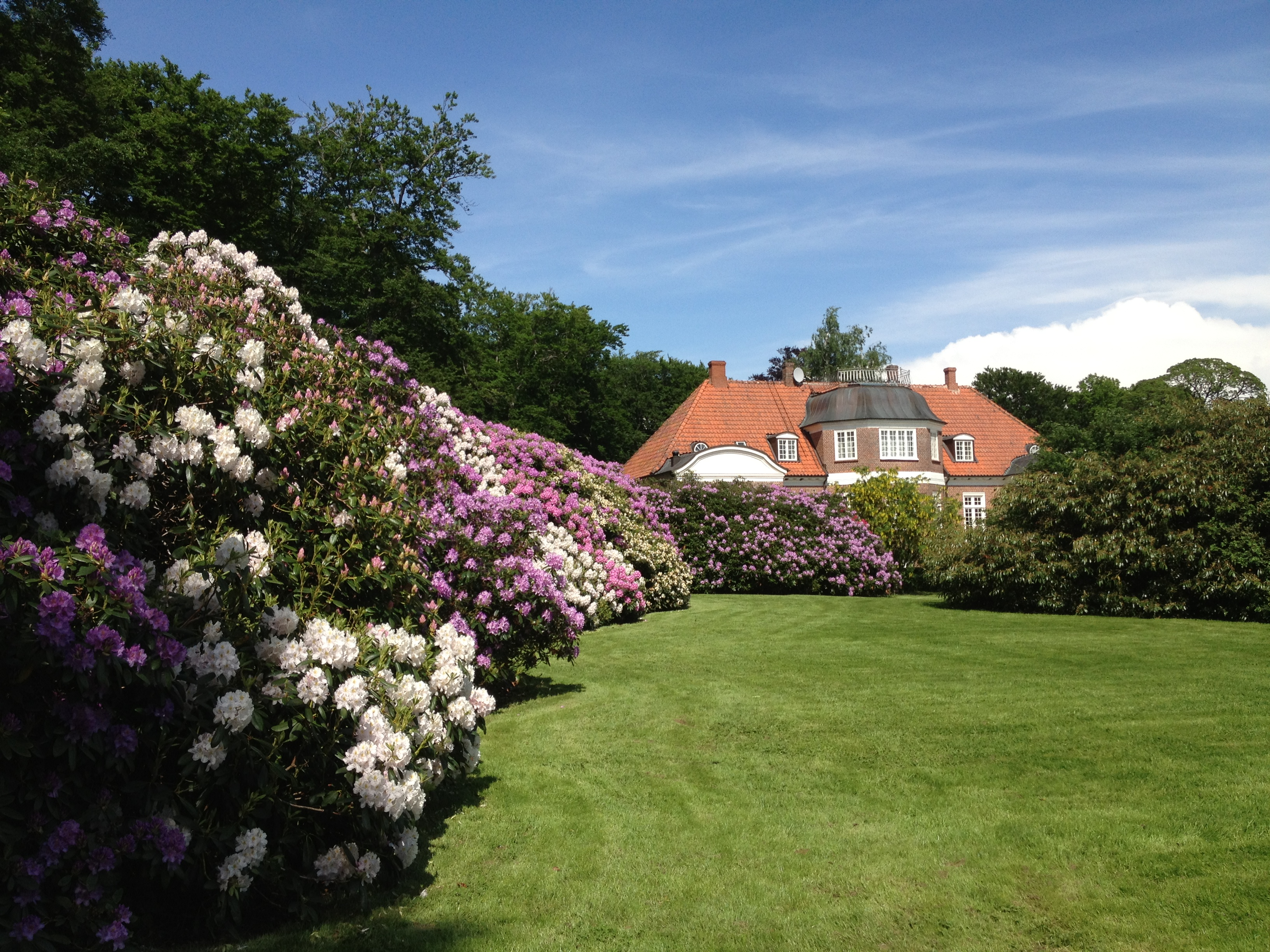
Rhododendron in blossom at Balderup, Skåne, Sweden

Balderup is an estate, located on the plateau above Arild village in Höganäs Municipality, Skåne County, Sweden. It is considered as part of the particularly valuable cultural environment on the Kullaberg peninsula. The manor was built by MP John Olsson during the years 1905-1906 and designed by the Danish architect Christopher Varming. The building is constructed of red brick with a hipped tiled roof and architectural details in white limestone. The grounds covered 50 ha, which was achieved through the consolidation of land which was previously Flundarp, Bracke and Eleshult. Olsson erected 11 greenhouses and a park of 5 ha, famous for the extensive rhododendron bushes, rose plants and exotic trees and plants.
