= Nimis (artwork) =

Conceptual artwork by Lars Vilks

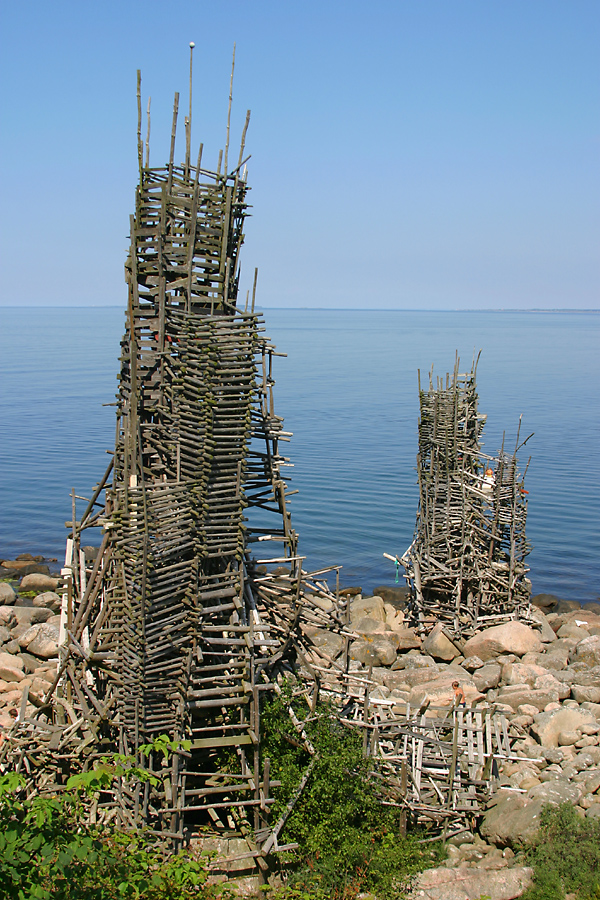
Nimis (Towers) 2002

Nimis (from the latin, "too much") is a site-specific sculpture and proverbial chancellory of Ladonia by Lars Vilks located at Håle stenar in the north western region of Skåne, Sweden, in the declared micronation Ladonia. The artwork mostly consists of wooden constructions erected of driftwood, planks and branches. The work is illegally placed in Kullaberg, which has led to an ongoing legal process between the artist and the Skåne County administrative board. Parts of the artwork have been set on fire on different occasions, and it was rebuilt after a fire in 2016 by Ladonia's Minister of Arts and Hope, Fredrik Larsson. This rebuilding led to a fine being issued in 2018 by a district court.

Vilks viewed Nimis as a conceptual piece of art and the legal issues were hence a part of the concept. Since 1986 the artwork has been owned by the artist couple Christo and Jeanne-Claude. Vilks also claimed that the artwork was placed in the microstate Ladonia. In the same area is also another one of Vilks artwork located, Arx.

== History ==
=== Background ===
Nimis was built out of driftwood and is made of sparingly nailed together boards and branches which form pathways, rooms and towers. The construction of Nimis began in July 1980 as Vilks' "revenge to the ocean" after having been close to drowning, but also as a comment to the current trend in art where "nothing lasted".

=== Development ===
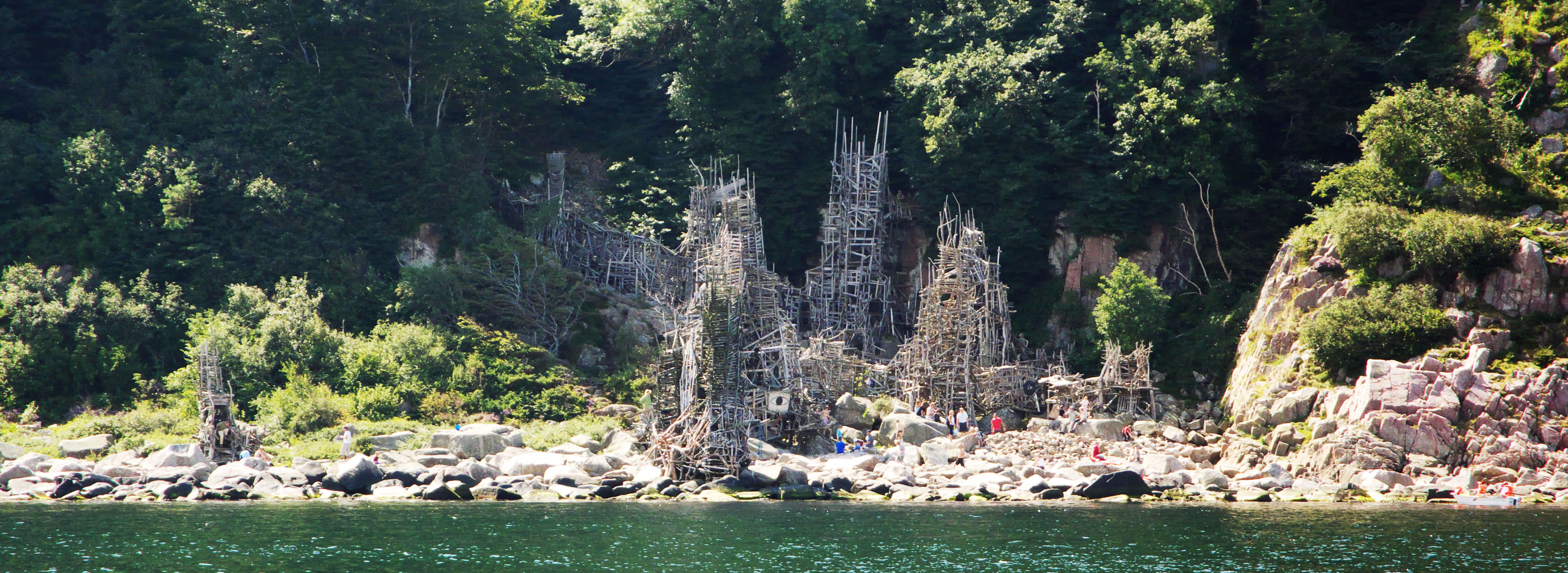
Nimis viewed from the water

The authorities did not know that Nimis existed until 1982. When they became aware of the situation they tried to go forward with demolishing it due to its unlawful construction. This led to a long legal process which Vilks introduced into his artistic practice and regarded as a piece of the artwork. The physical work grew, and spanned over 100 meters, while some of the towers were above 15 meters tall.

Nimis has been updated over the decades and over 160,000 nails have been used during these years.

In 1984 Nimis was sold to the German artist Joseph Beuys, and after his death it was sold to the artist couple Christo and Jeanne-Claude in 1986.

=== Fire in 2016, verdict in 2018 ===
The whole Vindarnas torn, which was approximately 25 percent of the artwork, burned down on 24 November 2016. Other parts of the artwork were also damaged. After that, Vilks started a mission to secure the artwork and rebuild it, but in another shape. Due to this Vilks was sentenced by the Skåne County administrative board to pay a fine in 2018, which he aimed to dispute.

== Image gallery ==
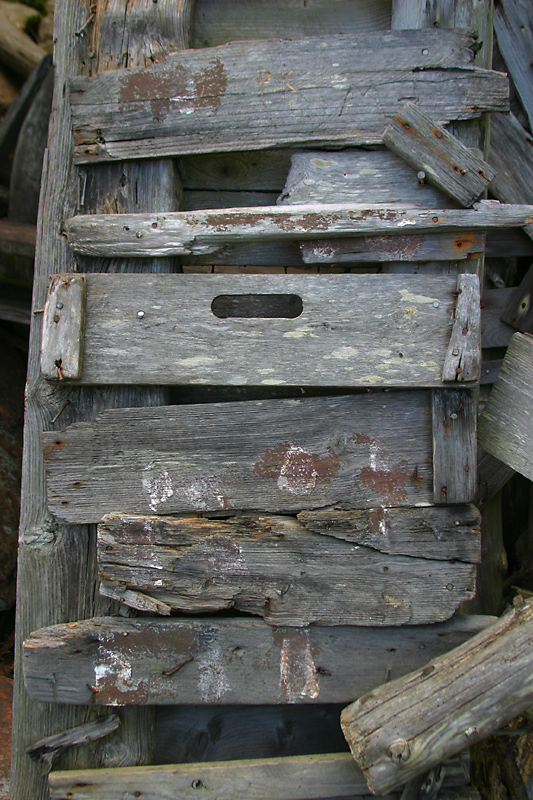

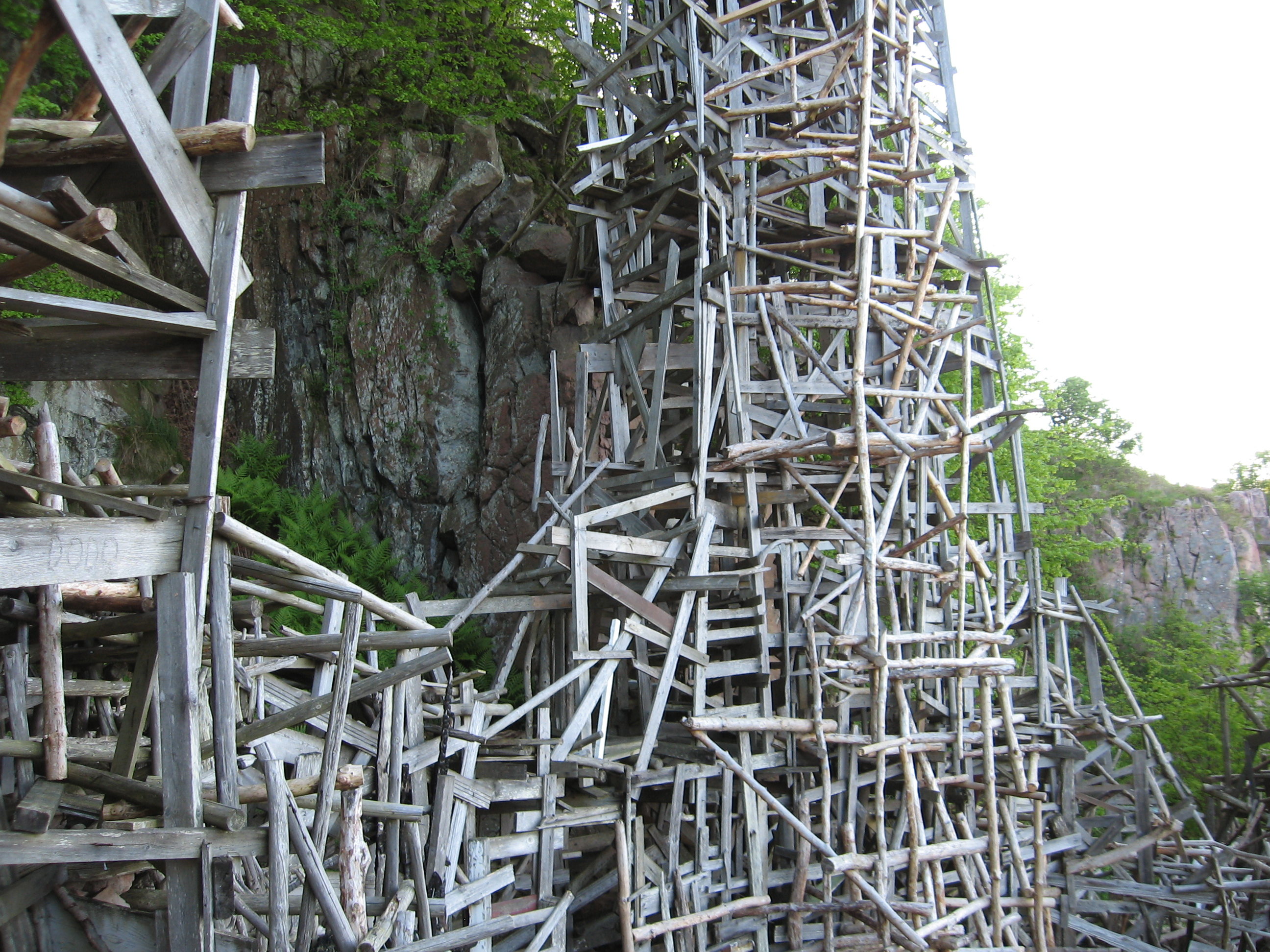

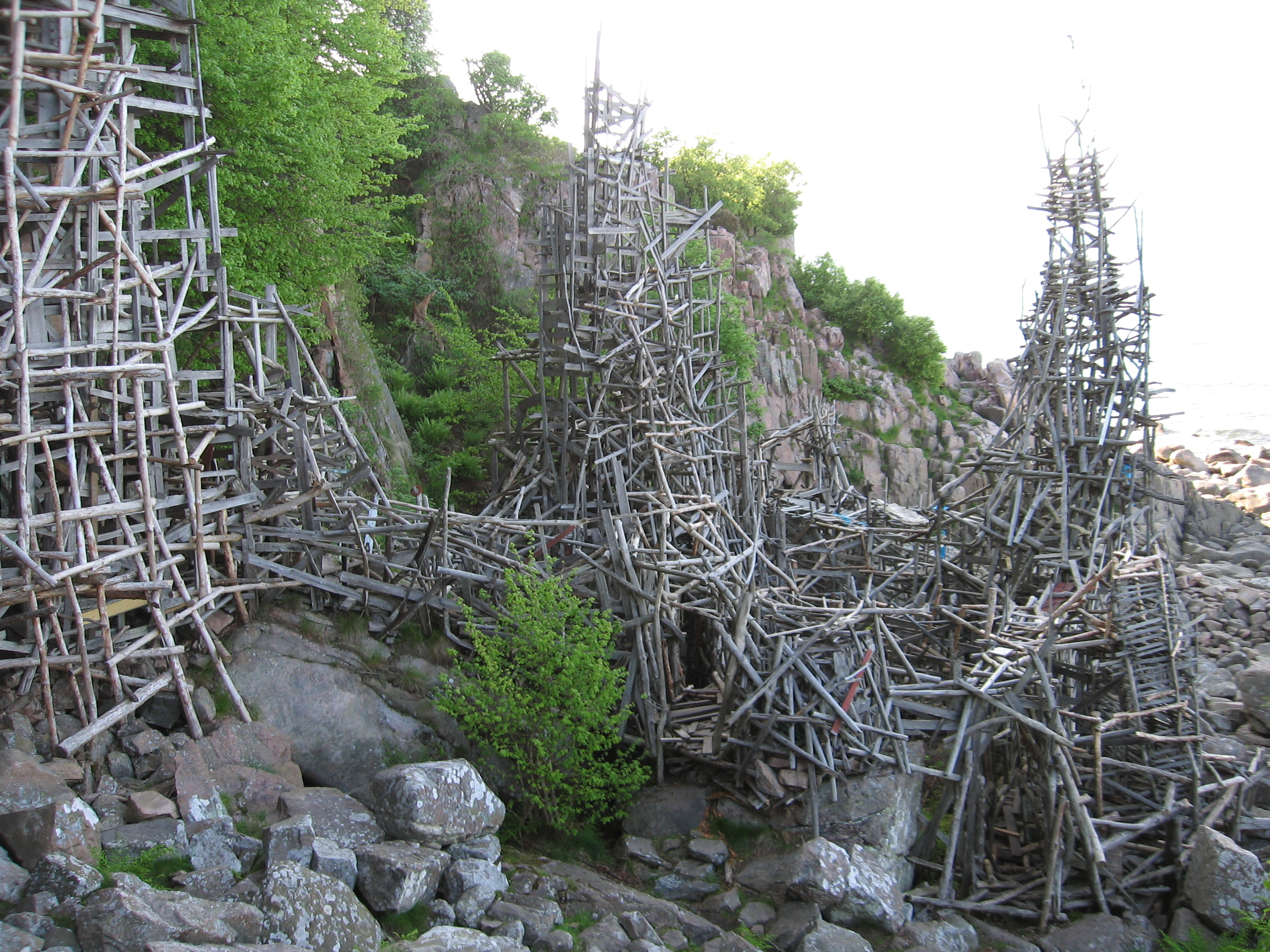

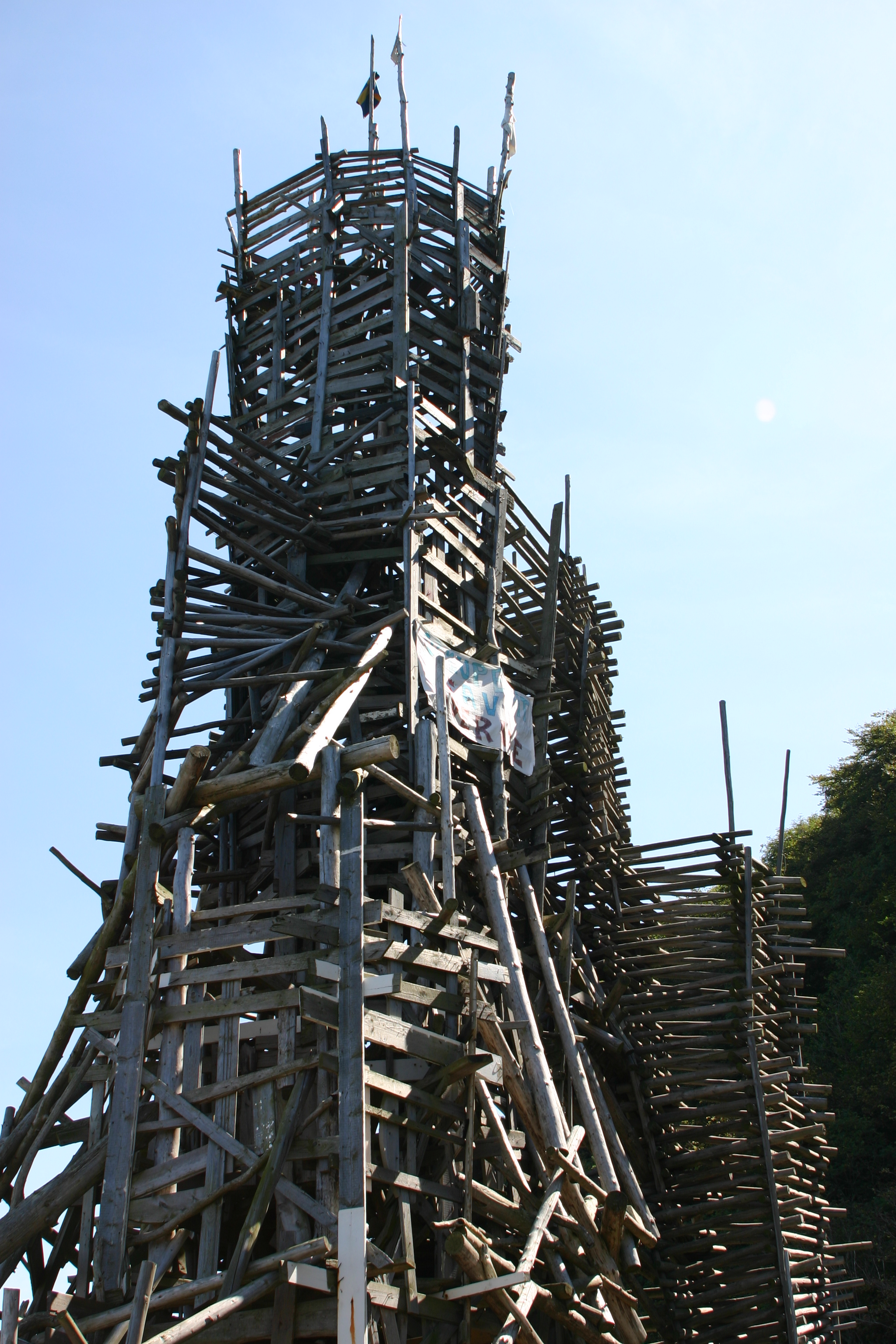

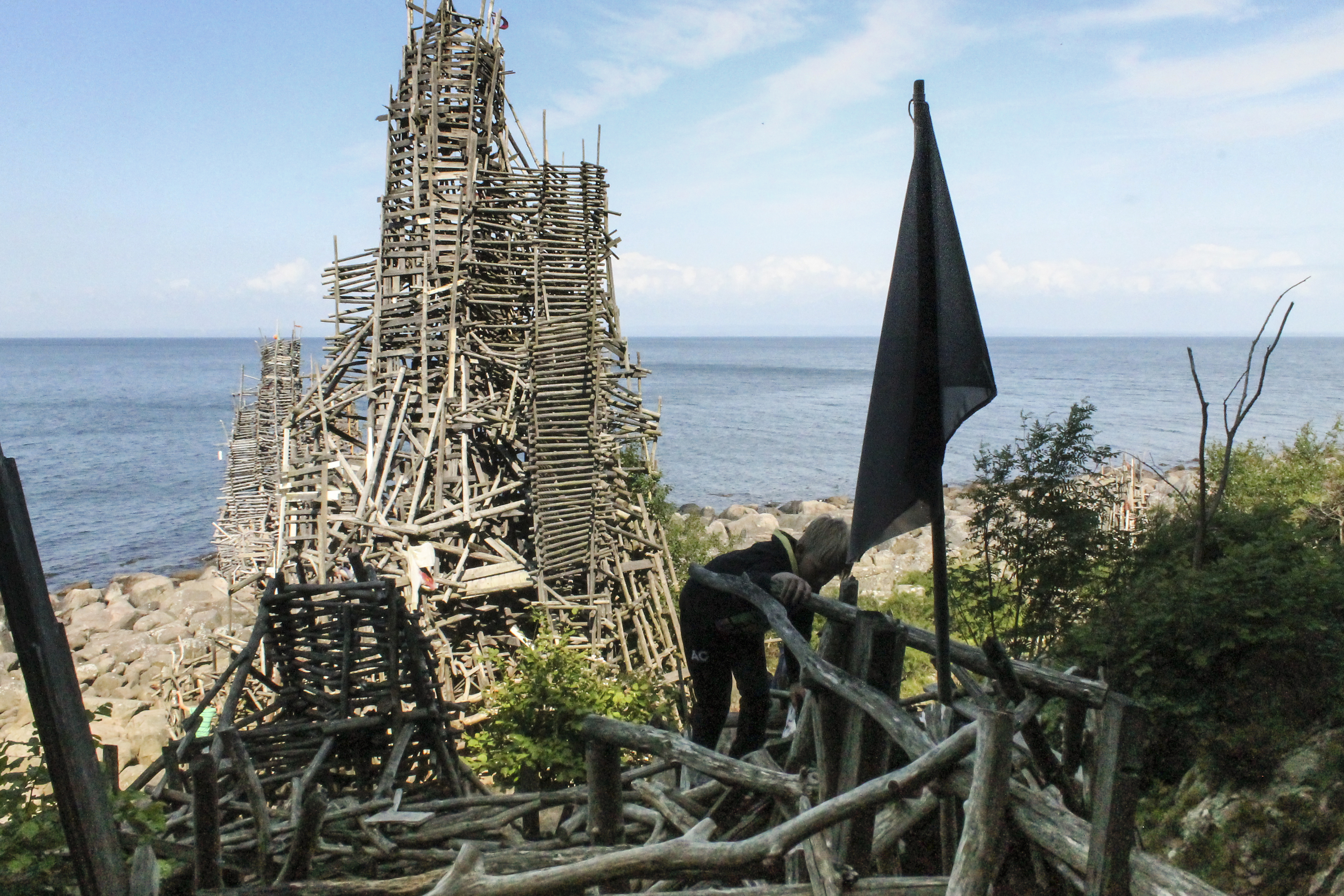

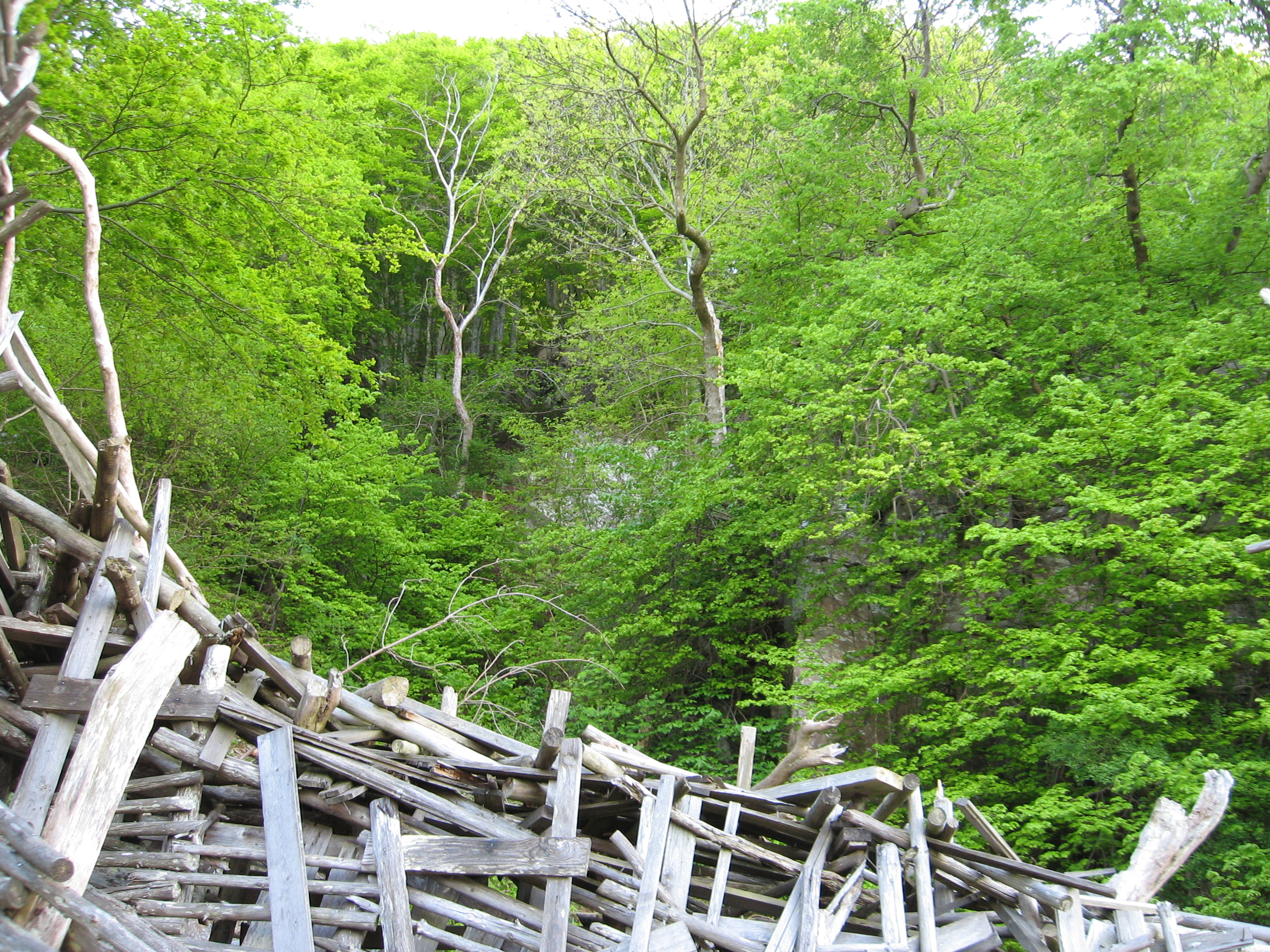

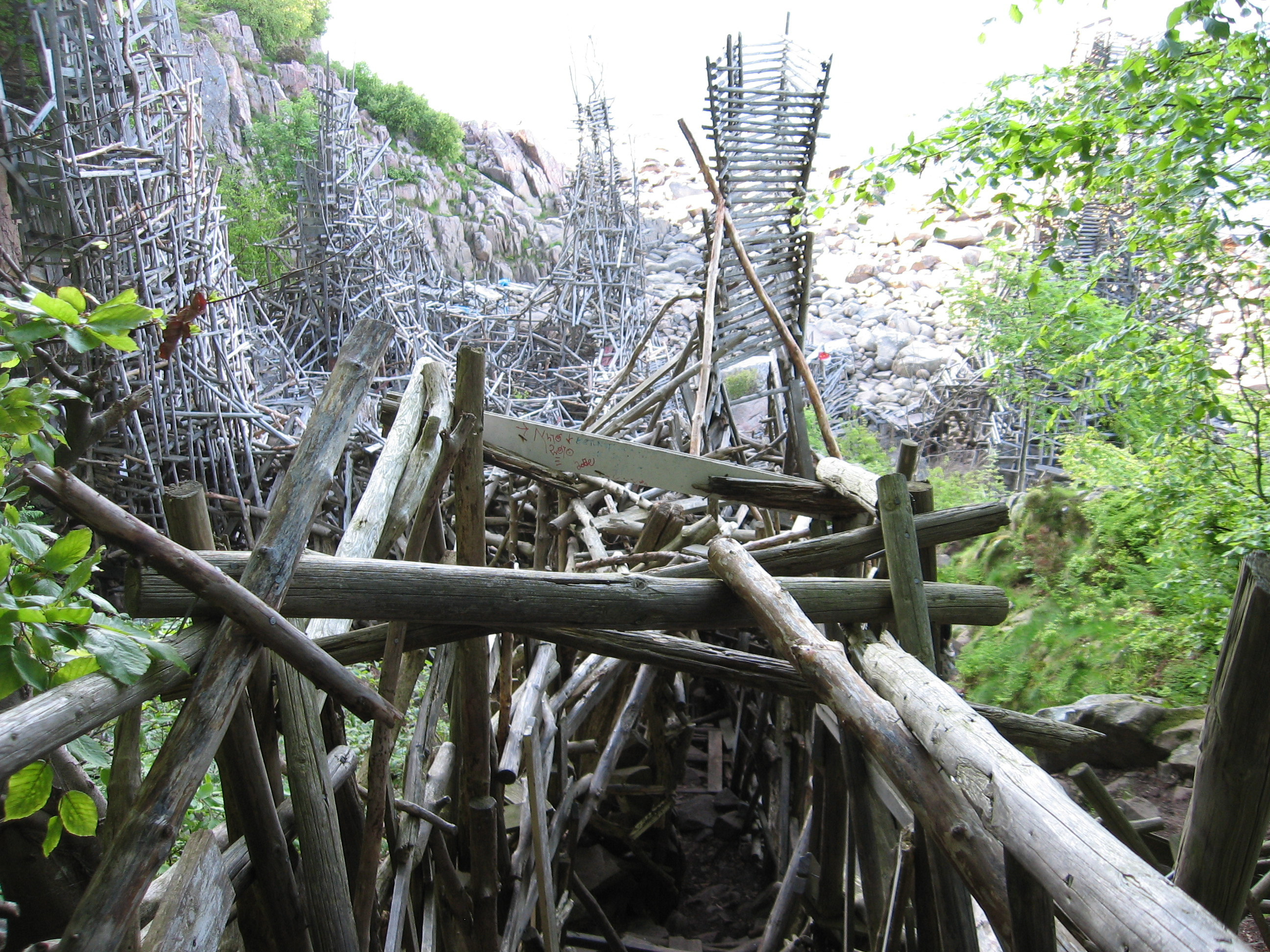
