= Driftwood =

Wood that has washed ashore

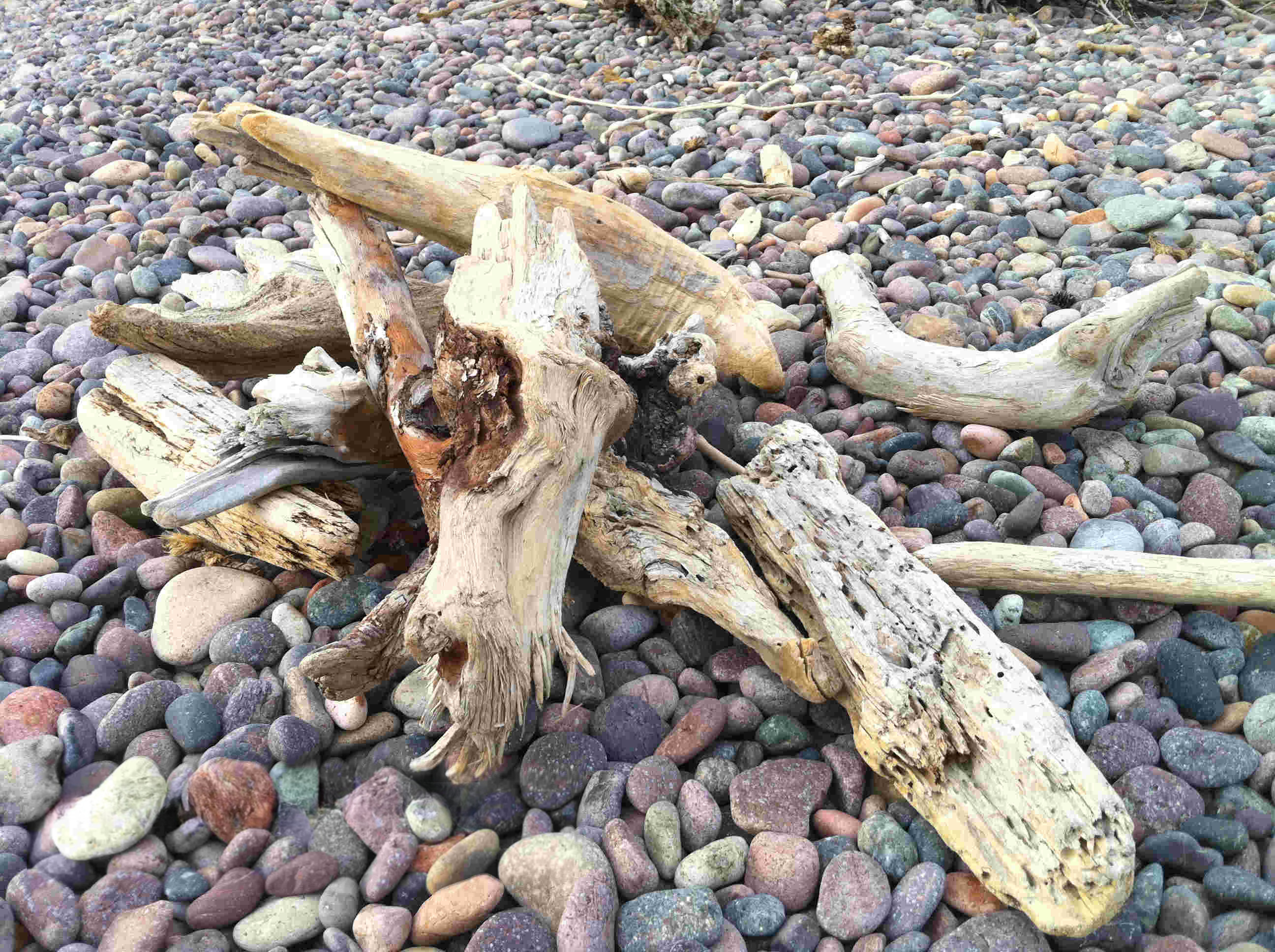
Driftwood on a pebble beach

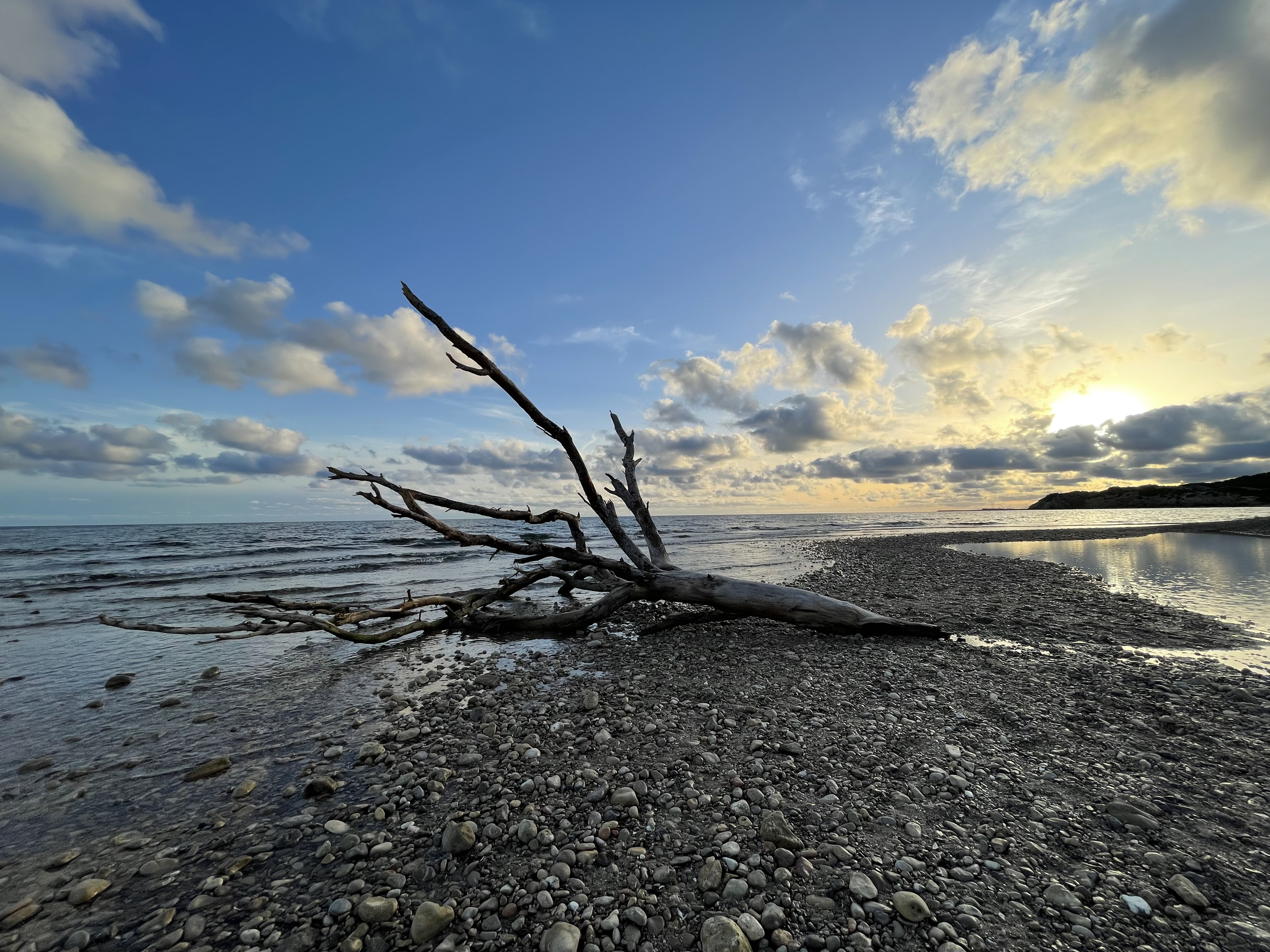
Driftwood on the beach in Sitges, Spain

Driftwood is wood that has been washed onto a shore or beach of a sea, lake, or river by the action of winds, tides or waves. It is part of beach wrack.

In some waterfront areas, driftwood is a major nuisance. However, driftwood provides shelter and food for birds, fish and other aquatic species as it floats in the ocean. Gribbles, shipworms and bacteria decompose the wood and gradually turn it into nutrients that are reintroduced to the food web. Sometimes, the partially decomposed wood washes ashore, where it also shelters birds, plants, and other species. Driftwood can become the foundation for sand dunes.

Most driftwood is the remains of trees, in whole or part, that have been washed into the ocean, due to flooding, high winds, or other natural occurrences, or as the result of logging. There is also a subset of driftwood known as drift lumber. Drift lumber includes the remains of man-made wooden objects, such as buildings and their contents washed into the sea during storms, wooden objects discarded into the water from shore, dropped dunnage or lost cargo from ships (jetsam), and the remains of shipwrecked wooden ships and boats (flotsam). Erosion and wave action may make it difficult or impossible to determine the origin of a particular piece of driftwood.

Driftwood can be used as part of decorative furniture or other art forms, and is a popular element in the scenery of fish tanks.

== History ==
According to Norse mythology, the first humans, Ask and Embla, were formed out of two pieces of driftwood, an ash and an elm, by the god Odin and his brothers, Vili and Vé. The Vikings would cast wood into the sea before making landfall. The location of the wood would be an indication as to where to build their mead halls. The wood used would found the high-seat pillars of the new hall.

The "Old Man of the Lake" in Crater Lake, Oregon is a full-size tree that has been bobbing vertically in the lake for more than a century. Due to the cold water of the lake, the tree has been well preserved.

In the early 20th century, American intellectual Alice Gray fought to preserve the Indiana Dunes, which contain quantities of driftwood. She lived amongst the dunes, naming her cottage "Driftwood" and making all her furniture from the material.

== Uses ==
Driftwood carried to the ocean by Arctic rivers was the main, and sometimes only, source of wood for Inuit and other Arctic peoples living north of the tree line before they came into regular contact with European traders, and knowledge of sites where driftwood accumulated was highly valued. Kayaks and umiaks were fashioned from driftwood frames covered in skins. Driftwood was used to construct semisubterranean dwellings built of wood and sod, and to make tools, utensils and weapons.

The Inuit classified driftwood into seven different types, each possessing its own unique material and visual properties. Driftwood could be used to make bows if it was straight grained and in reasonably good condition; these were reinforced with sinew cables. The Inuit even made arrows from driftwood; these were often short and fitted with bone or antler foreshafts. Dry scrapings produced by working this material were collected, stored and used as firestarters year-round by the Inuit. Wood that is burned today in these regions mainly consists of the remains of condemned wooden structures. Driftwood is still used as kindling by some. Woods with resinous qualities, such as cedar, are preferred for their lengthier burning times.

=== Sculptures ===
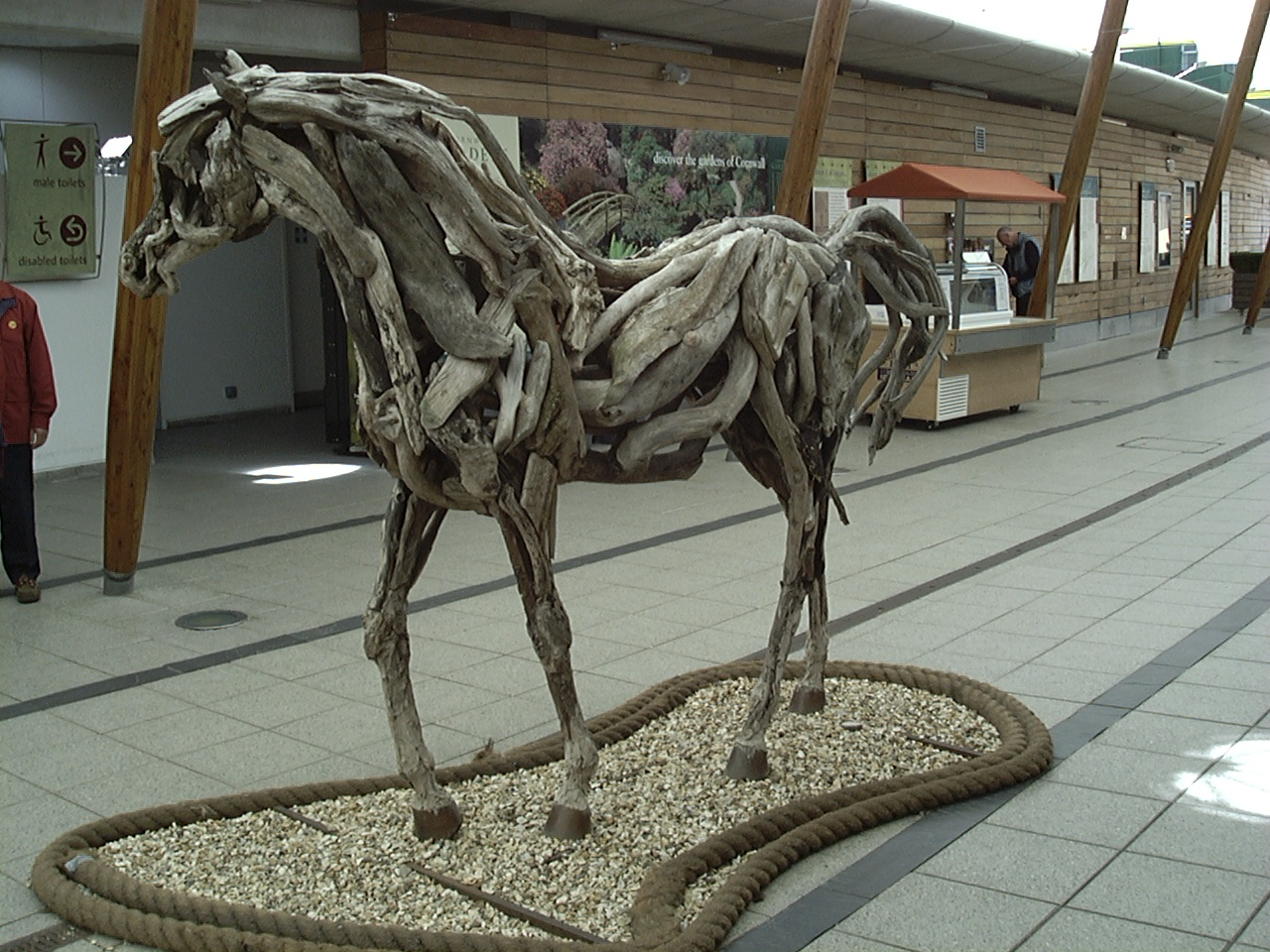
Driftwood sculpture of a horse by artist Heather Jansch at the Eden Project

Driftwood sculptures are sculptures that are made of driftwood found on beaches or along riverbanks.

- At Kullaberg, Sweden, Lars Vilks created Nimis a driftwood artwork in the year 1980. This sculpture and two others led to the declaration of Ladonia as an independent nation.
- Sculptures were created on the Emeryville, California mudflat and marsh area of San Francisco Bay in the late 1960s.
- The Ashden Awards for Sustainable Energy (sometimes called the "Green Oscars") are sculpted out of driftwood.
- Artist Deborah Butterfield is known for her sculptures of horses, initially rendered from driftwood before being cast in bronze.
- In January the annual Driftwood and Sand festival is held in Hokitika, New Zealand.

=== Forts ===
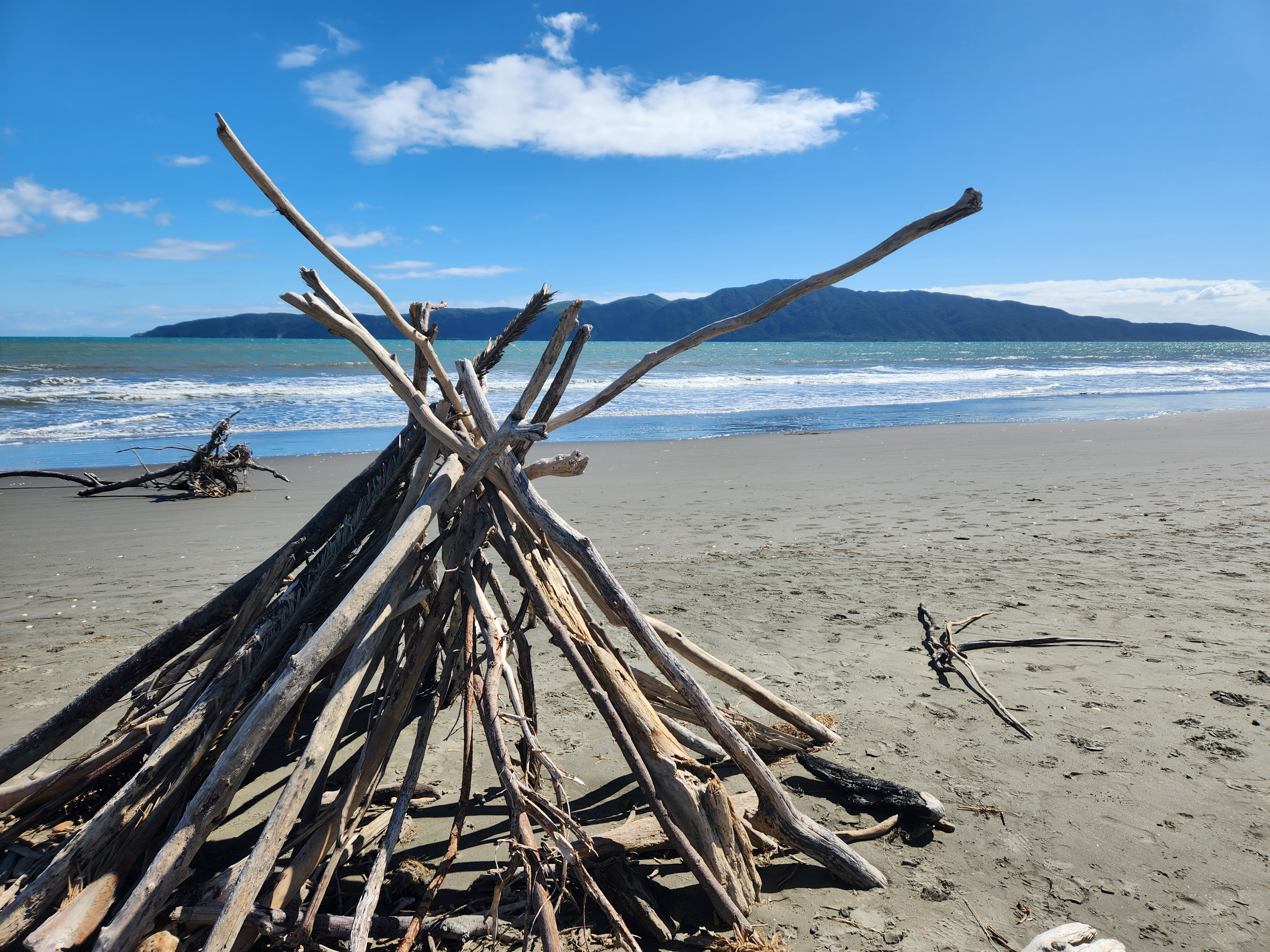
Fort made of driftwood with Kapiti Island in the background

Driftwood is commonly used to make temporary shelters on beaches.

=== Firewood ===
The EPA includes driftwood in its list of "Items You Should Never Burn in Your [Wood-Burning] Appliance," because it will "release toxic chemicals when burned".

The government of British Columbia also advises against burning driftwood, as dioxins may be released from the reaction of chloride ions with other materials in the smoke.

== Ecology ==
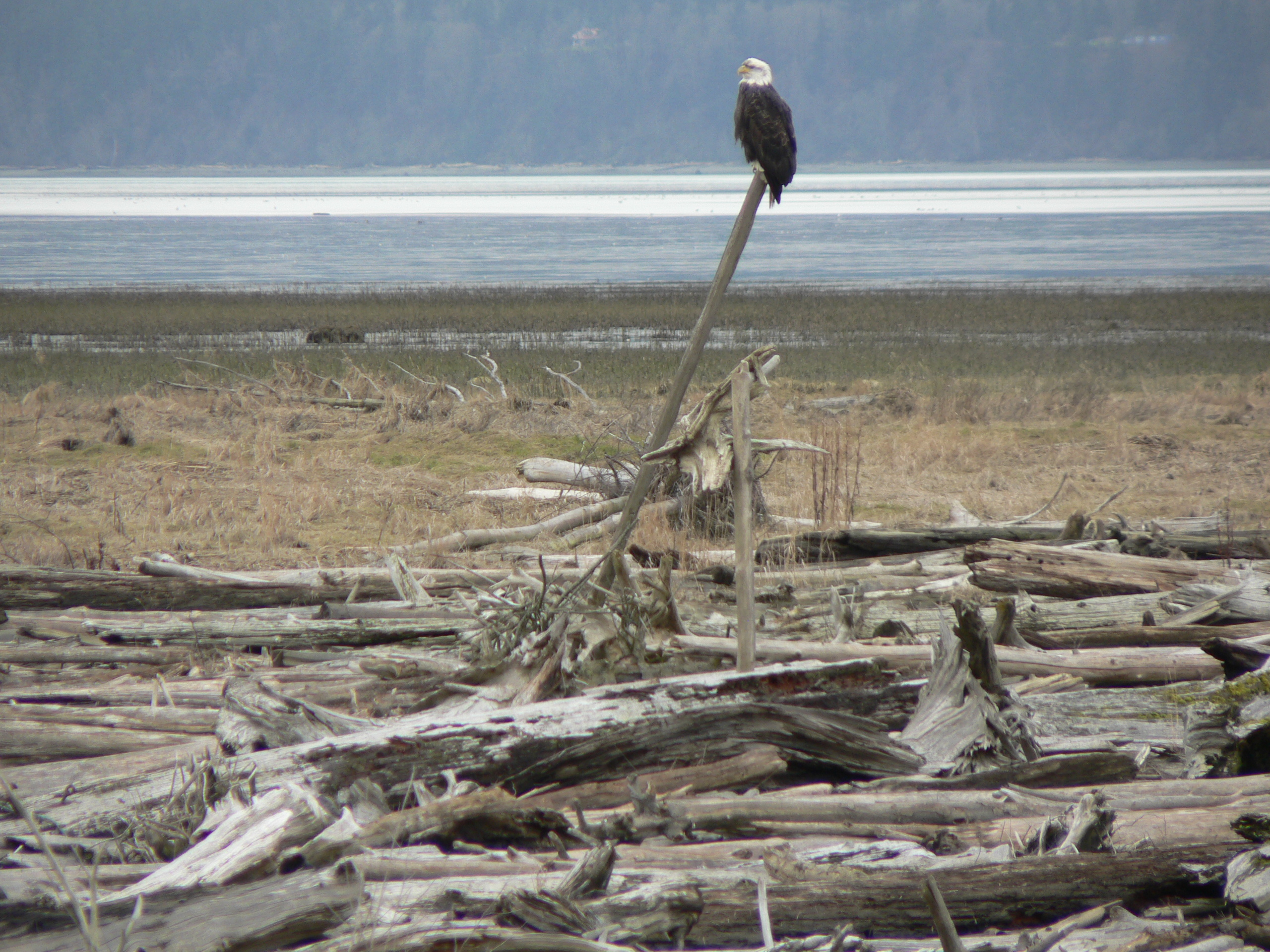
Driftwood provides a perch for a bald eagle on Fir Island, Washington.

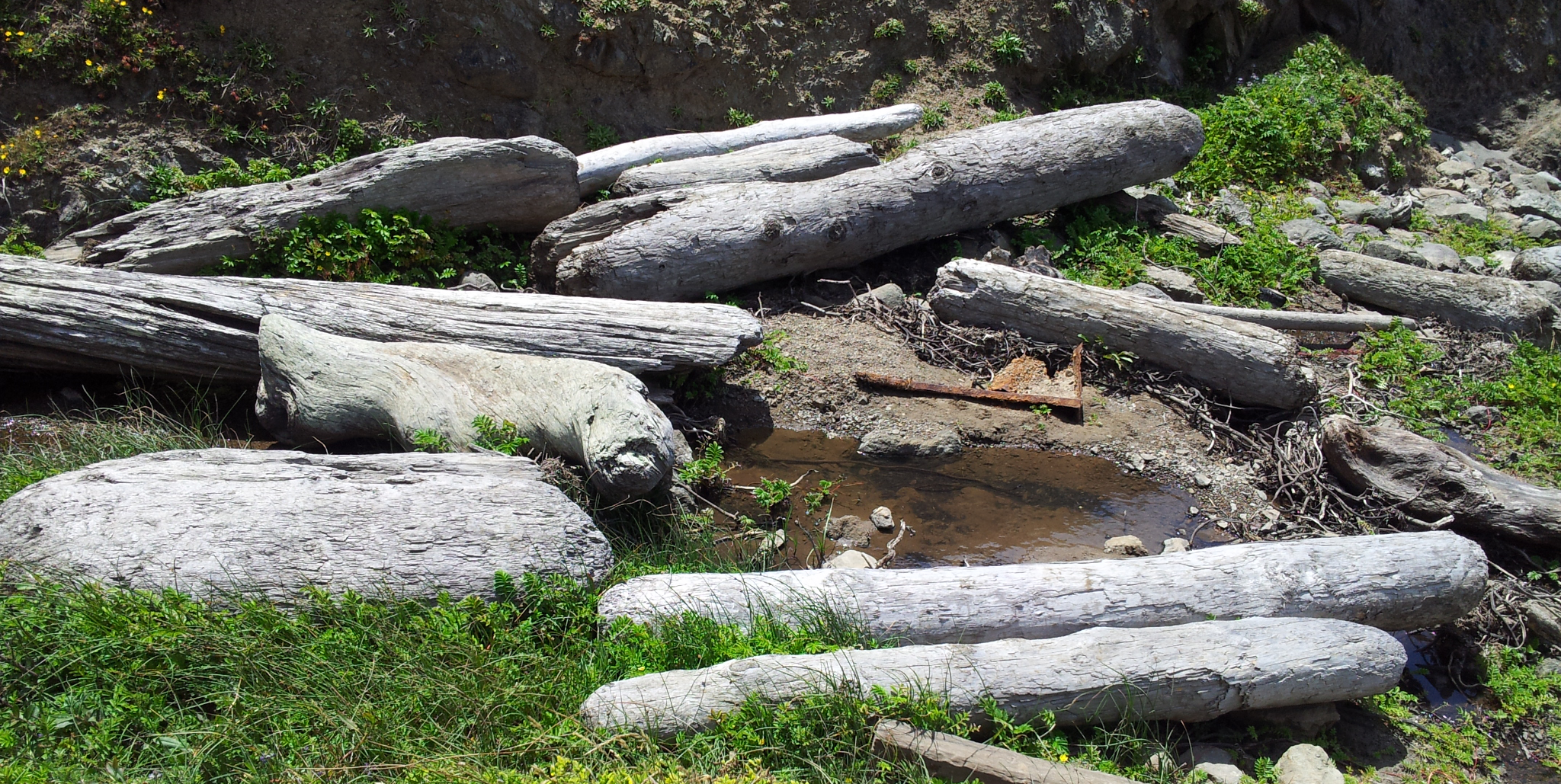
Sequoia sempervirens driftwood logs

As pieces of driftwood are more difficult for wind and water to displace than grains of sand, driftwood creates pockets of stability on beaches, allowing organisms that would not be able to survive on open sand to become established there. Driftwood logs can trap windblown sand, causing temporary sand dunes to form which may then be stabilized by beach grasses. Driftwood can also catch both seeds and dead organic matter, thus creating germination sites for plants.

Open-ocean fish sometimes congregate around pieces of driftwood that have not yet washed ashore. Some fish feed on fungi and plankton growing on the floating wood, while some use the driftwood as shelter to escape predators.

Organisms that feed on pieces of driftwood such as beetles and marine snails can be transported across stretches of ocean on floating driftwood, allowing these species to colonize new islands.

Driftwood that has become waterlogged and sunk to the bottom of the ocean has been proposed as a means by which organisms became established in communities on the abyssal plain, as some microbe species that live around hydrothermal vents also inhabit driftwood, and some animals that live around vents are closely related to species found in waterlogged wood.

== Decline ==
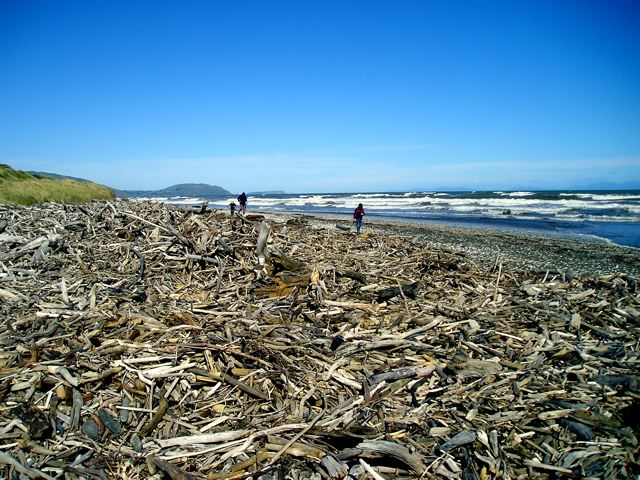
A beach on the West Coast of New Zealand covered by driftwood.

Early accounts indicate that driftwood was once more plentiful. Early photographs of the Pacific coast of North America reveal greater amounts of driftwood on the beaches than is present today. Likewise, when traveling around the Dixon Entrance in the late 1800s, George A. Dorsey recorded that many beaches were "piled high with drift, often to a height of sixty feet or more."

With the advent of industrial logging practices, forest cover has declined globally, leading to a decrease in the amount of wood entering rivers. Much of the wood that enters rivers, which might otherwise travel downstream and become driftwood, is caught behind dams, where it is removed before it can reach the sea. Melting polar ice may also contribute to the decline of Siberian driftwood in the Atlantic, as more extensive sea ice used to allow driftwood to travel greater distances without becoming waterlogged.

Humans sometimes remove driftwood from beaches for aesthetic reasons; such "cleaned" beaches display lower species diversity of both plants and invertebrates.

== See also ==
- Large woody debris
- Sea glass
