= Mölle =

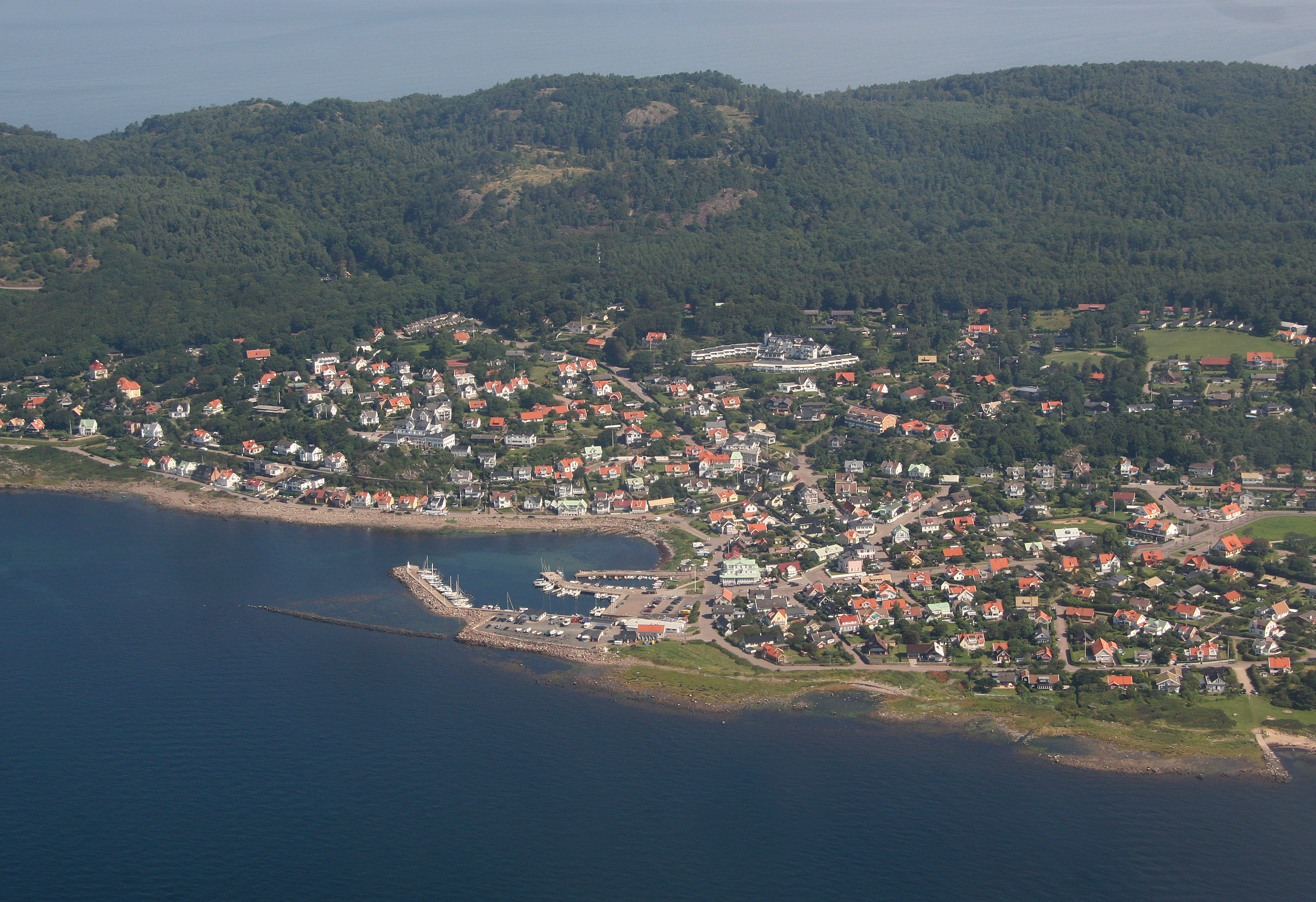
- August 2007 aerial view of Mölle

- Location within Skåne Location within Sweden
- Coordinates: 56°17′N 12°30′E
- Country: Sweden
- Province: Skåne
- County: Skåne County
- Municipality: Höganäs Municipality

Area
  - Total: 0.72 km^{2} (0.28 sq mi)

Population (31 December 2010)
  - Total: 715
  - Density: 988/km^{2} (2,560/sq mi)
- Time zone: UTC+1 (CET)
  - Summer (DST): UTC+2 (CEST)

Mölle is a locality situated in Höganäs Municipality, Skåne County, Sweden with 715 inhabitants in 2010.

It is best known for its scenic harbour and its location adjacent to the Kullaberg Nature Reserve. Its harbour, situated on the Kattegat Strait, provides services for marine fishing, watersports outings and tour excursions along the coast, especially the rocky shore of Kullaberg to the north. Fodor characterizes Mölle as "a small town set in spectacular isolation on the dramatic headland of the Kulla Peninsula".

As a historic seaside resort, Mölle has hosted numerous technical and professional conferences such as: the Swedish Network of European Economists, Joint Swedish-Russian International Workshop on Information Theory; and the Royal Society (United Kingdom) of Tropical Medicine and Hygiene.

== Logistics ==
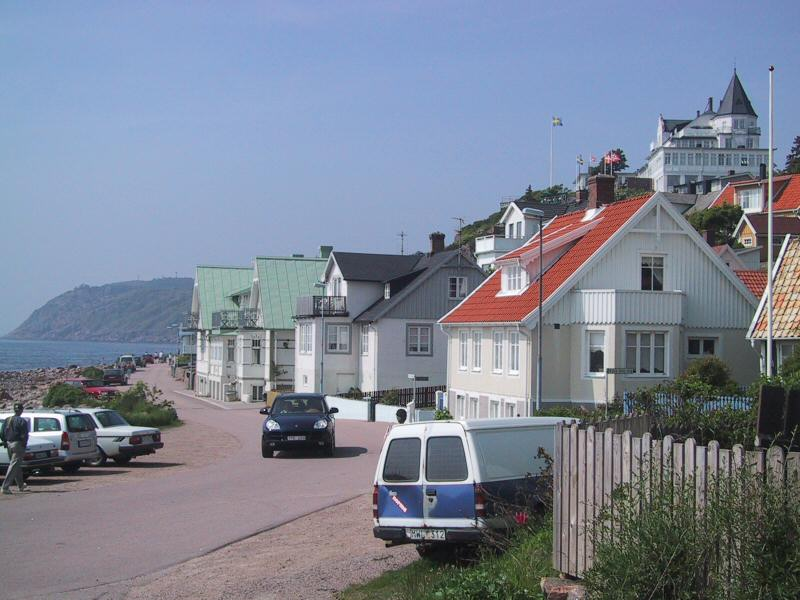
Mölle

Mölle can be accessed from the north south coastal road 111, which effectively accesses Mölle from the south and terminates at Kullaberg, just north of Mölle. The nearest airport is approximately 19 kilometers distant at Ängelholm. Mölle is situated 35 kilometers northwest of Helsingborg. The nearest villages are Björkeröd and Kockenhus, each about two kilometers distant. The town itself is nestled on the steeply sloping hillside above the Kattegat Strait. Mölle’s official altitude is given as 16 meters, although the harbour and coastal area are of course essentially at sea level. The time zone there is UTC+1.

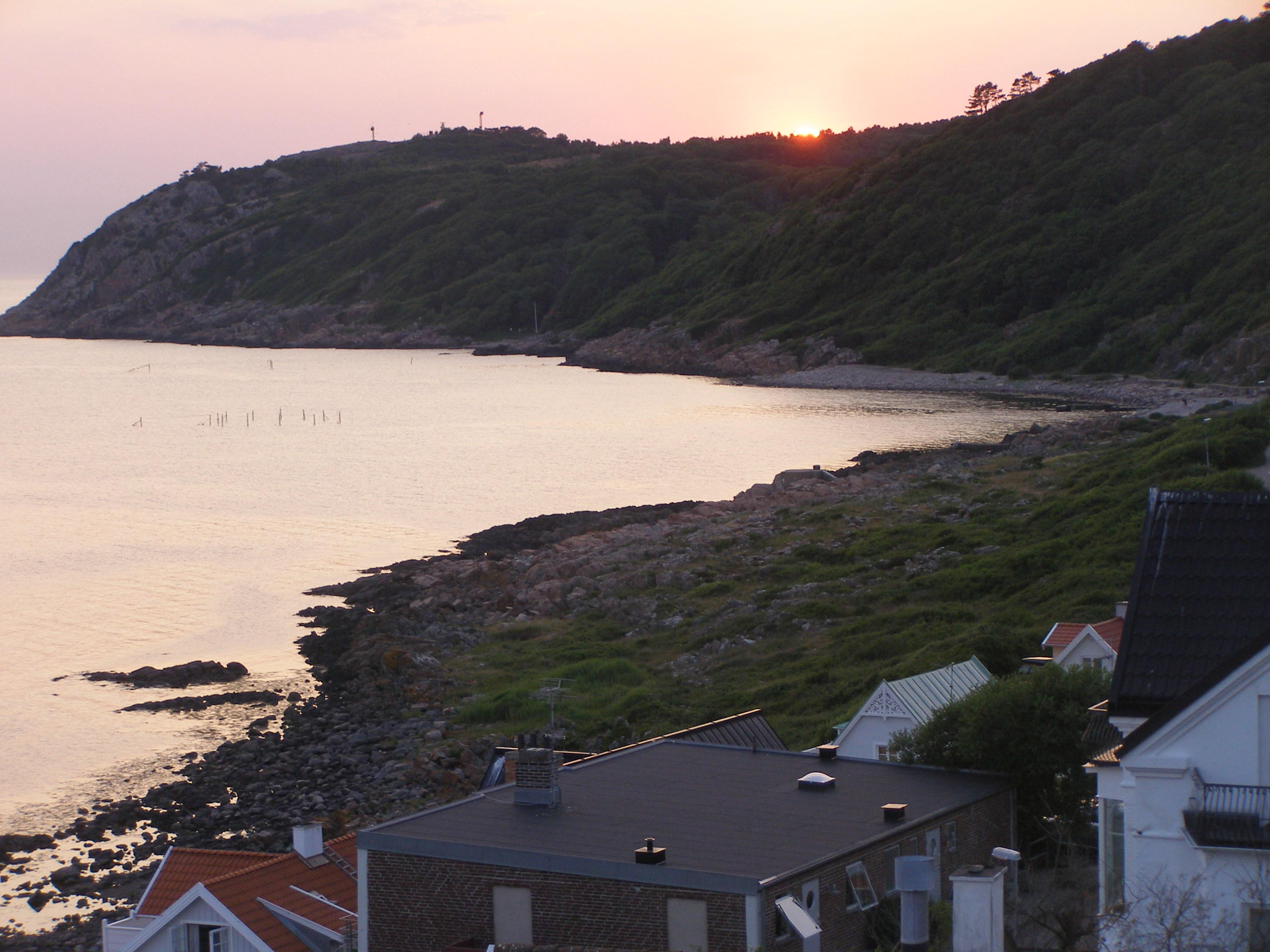
Looking west into the Kullaberg along the rocky shore from the rooftops of Mölle

== Environmental factors ==
Mölle has a littoral zone habitat consisting of shingle beach and rocky shoreline; this ecosystem has a panoply of coastal wildflowers, lichens and mosses, as well as abundant birdlife. Surrounding the higher elevations of hillside Mölle are broadleaf deciduous forests of mixed oak and beech trees, which ecosystem graduates into the Kullaberg upper reaches. This habitat fosters a diverse upland flora and fauna, notably since the Kullaberg is listed as an Important Bird Area.

Air quality conditions at Mölle are excellent with little industry in the immediate vicinity and prevailing offshore breezes characterizing the air flow. Sound levels are quite low, ranging from 43 to 56 dBA, since there is only a modest use of motor vehicles within the town. Pedestrians comprise much of the trip taking within Mölle, especially due to the efficient footpaths that scale the hill, with only more indirect routes available for motor vehicles.

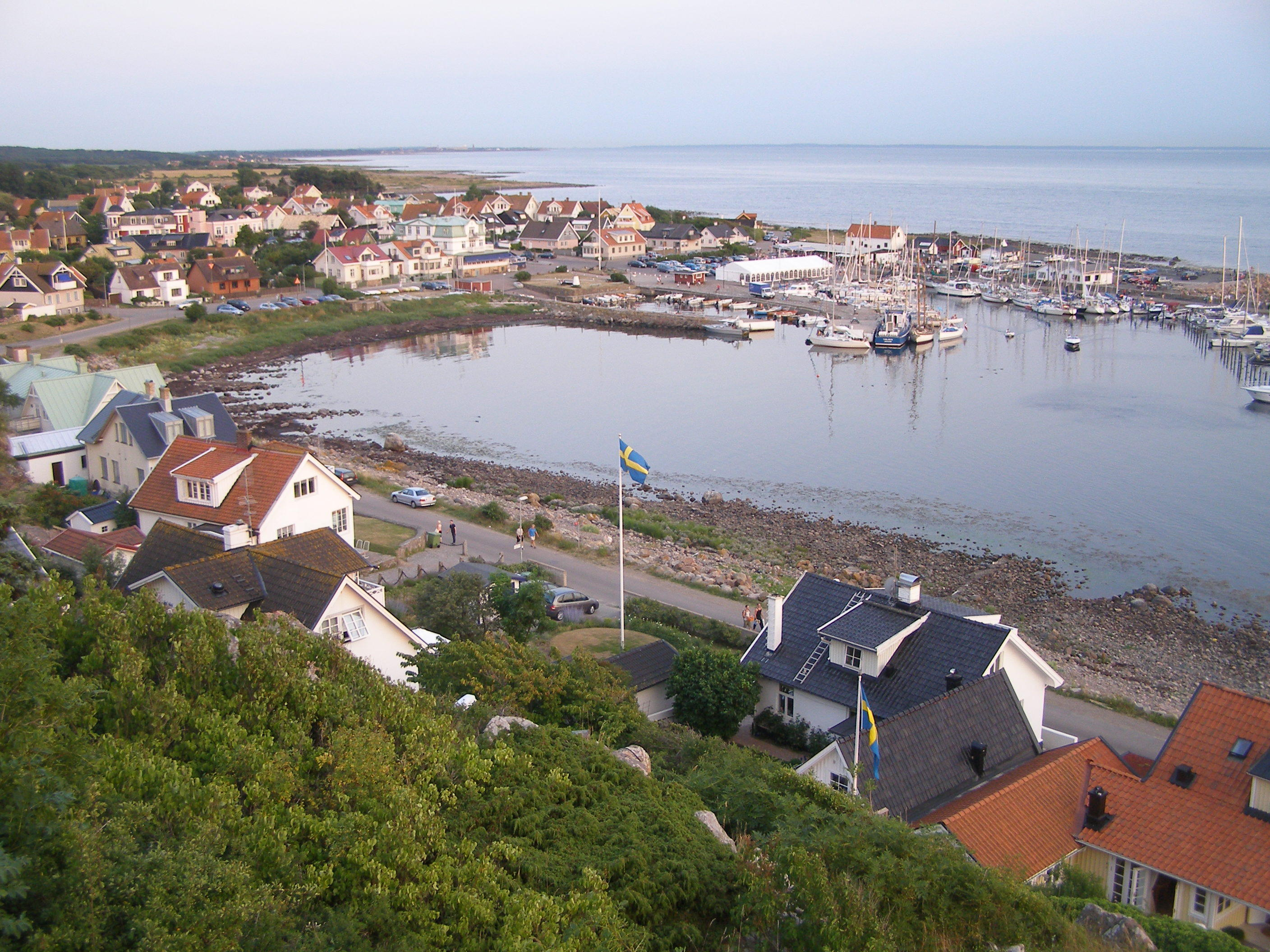
Harbour at Mölle

== The harbour ==
The harbour has been constructed from a rock jetty that further encloses a natural bay and provides slips for approximately 130 small and medium-sized boats. Mölle's harbour is the economic and social center of the town, especially in summertime, when townspeople and visitors gravitate to the waterfront for walking, dining, shopping, socializing and engaging boats for day trips. In the warmest months swimmers can occasionally be seen in the cool waters of the harbour.

The harbour is also noteworthy because it commands a central position on the Kattegat Strait, one of the busiest parts of the Baltic Sea region. This strategic importance is magnified by the proximity of Mölle to the historic Kullen Lighthouse on the Kullaberg Peninsula, which is the brightest lighthouse in Sweden.

== History ==
Mölle was a lively 19th century fishing village, some of whose stately buildings survive to the present. It was earlier and still is today an enclave of relatively affluent residents, who initially made their fortunes from fishing. There are extant two sizeable 19th century hotels, which are perched high above the harbour. Other historic buildings surviving are the 1910 Villa Italienborg, built by a scrap dealer whose architectural ideas derived from a visit to the Italian Riviera. Villa Africa is a two-story historical residence erected by a Mölle sea captain to woo his bride to move from South Africa.

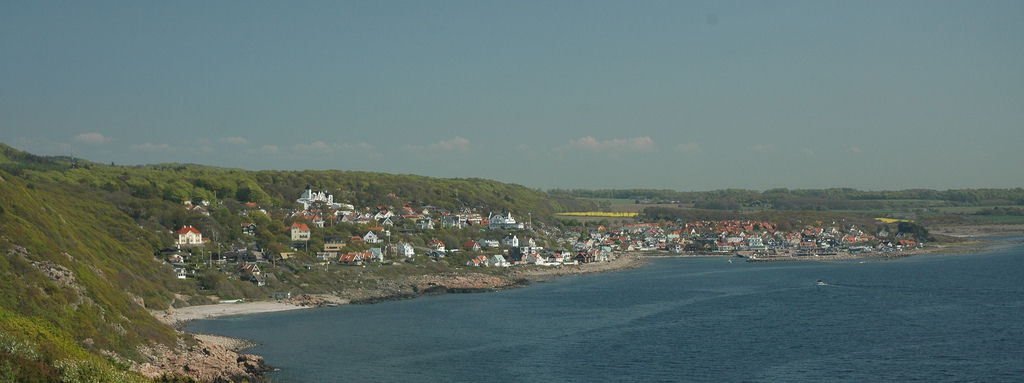
Mölle as seen from Kullaberg

In the latter part of the 19th century Mölle was renowned as a center for erotic entertainment, especially mixed sex bathing (considered marginally scandalous in that era); thus it attracted visitors from throughout Sweden as well as various parts of Europe. There was even a weekly train from Berlin to Mölle up until the First World War.

== Books ==
- Magnusson, Erik. "Det vackra huset i Möllebergsbacken, om 150 år av turism vid Kullabergs fot". ISBN 978-91-85517-11-4. Monitorförlaget 2009.
- Pyk, Hans-Otto. "Mölle genom fem sekler 1491-1991". Mölle byförening 1991.
- Knafve, Bert och Kirsten. "Bilder från Kullabygden". Liber 1981.
- Olsheden, Jan och Olsson, Stellan. "Vad gjorde farfar i Mölle?" ISBN B0014SP05M. Mölle 1967.
- Mölleryd, Anders W. "Mölle-Kullen genom tiderna". Del I-VII. Eremit-press 1959-81.
