= Kullaberg =

Peninsula and natural reserve in Scania, Sweden

Coordinates: 56°18′N 12°28′E

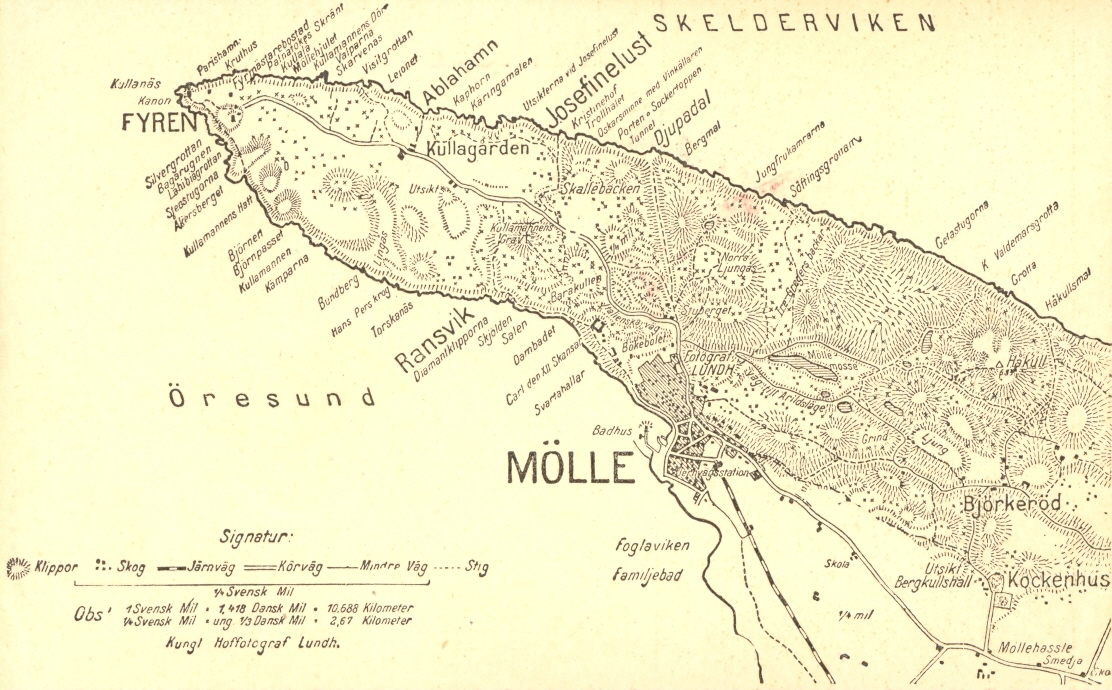
Kullaberg map

Kullaberg (Swedish pronunciation: [kɵlaˈbærj]) is a peninsula and nature reserve protruding into the Kattegat in Höganäs Municipality near the town of Mölle in southwest Sweden. The site in the province of Skåne is an area of considerable biodiversity supporting a number of rare species and has been designated as an Important Bird Area (IBA) in Sweden as well as a Special Protection Area (SPA). The terrain is dominated by steep cliffs rising from the sea and rocky outcrops on the ridge above, the highest elevation being Håkull at 188 metres. Ridgetop vegetation includes a mixed hardwood broadleaf forest consisting of birch, beech, oak and pine trees with an understory of hawthorn, juniper, wild honeysuckle and blackthorn. Among the notable rare plants are spring vetchling, Lathyrus sphaericus.

Inhabited as early as the Stone Age, there are extant stone circles, grave mounds, ancient village remains and other archeological features. Kullaberg is administered by the Höganäs Forestry Board and the Gyllenstierna Krapperup Foundation. Kullen Lighthouse, designed by architect Magnus Dahlander in 1898, is considered the brightest in Sweden, situated at the westernmost point of the reserve, guiding ships through this busy part of the Kattegat. Within this 75 square kilometre (18,500 acre) reserve are extensive hiking paths that criss-cross the ridge and provide access to dozens of beach coves nestled at the bottom of the cliff formations.

== History ==
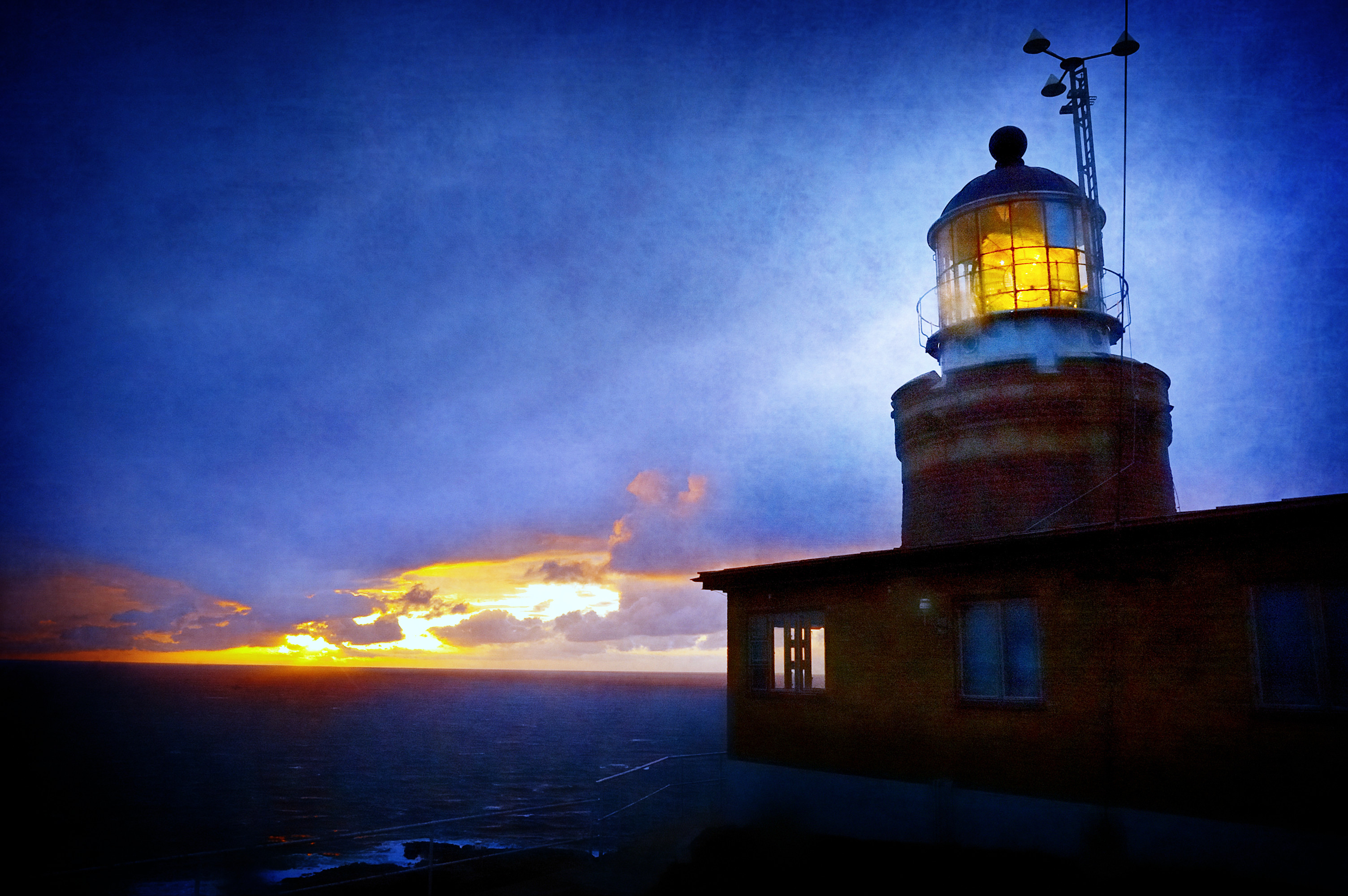
The lighthouse Kullen at the tip of Kullaberg

Stone Age inhabitants were in southern Sweden at least as early as 7000 BC, from archaeological evidence on the mainland as well as the large island of Öland. At Kullaberg clear evidence of habitation is found from tool findings, gravefields and stone circles. Later Iron Age peoples are also known to have inhabited the Kullaberg. The first written information about Kullaberg derives from about the year 1740 AD when Swedish naturalist Carl von Linne visited the area and recorded biological notes.

In the early 18th century a private group almost acquired the Kullaberg with the intention of quarrying the rich stone resource. Foresighted early environmentalists intervened for a period of trustee years until a formal trust was created to own and manage the preserve. AB Kullabergs Natur was established in 1913 and acquired a portion of the lands on the peninsula. In 1968, a portion of the site was owned by the Krapperup Estate (owners of nearby Krapperup Castle), and, at that time, the tenant in tail, Gustaf Gyllenstierna, consigned the balance of Kullaberg to the Gyllenstierna Krapperup Foundation.

== Habitats and vegetation ==
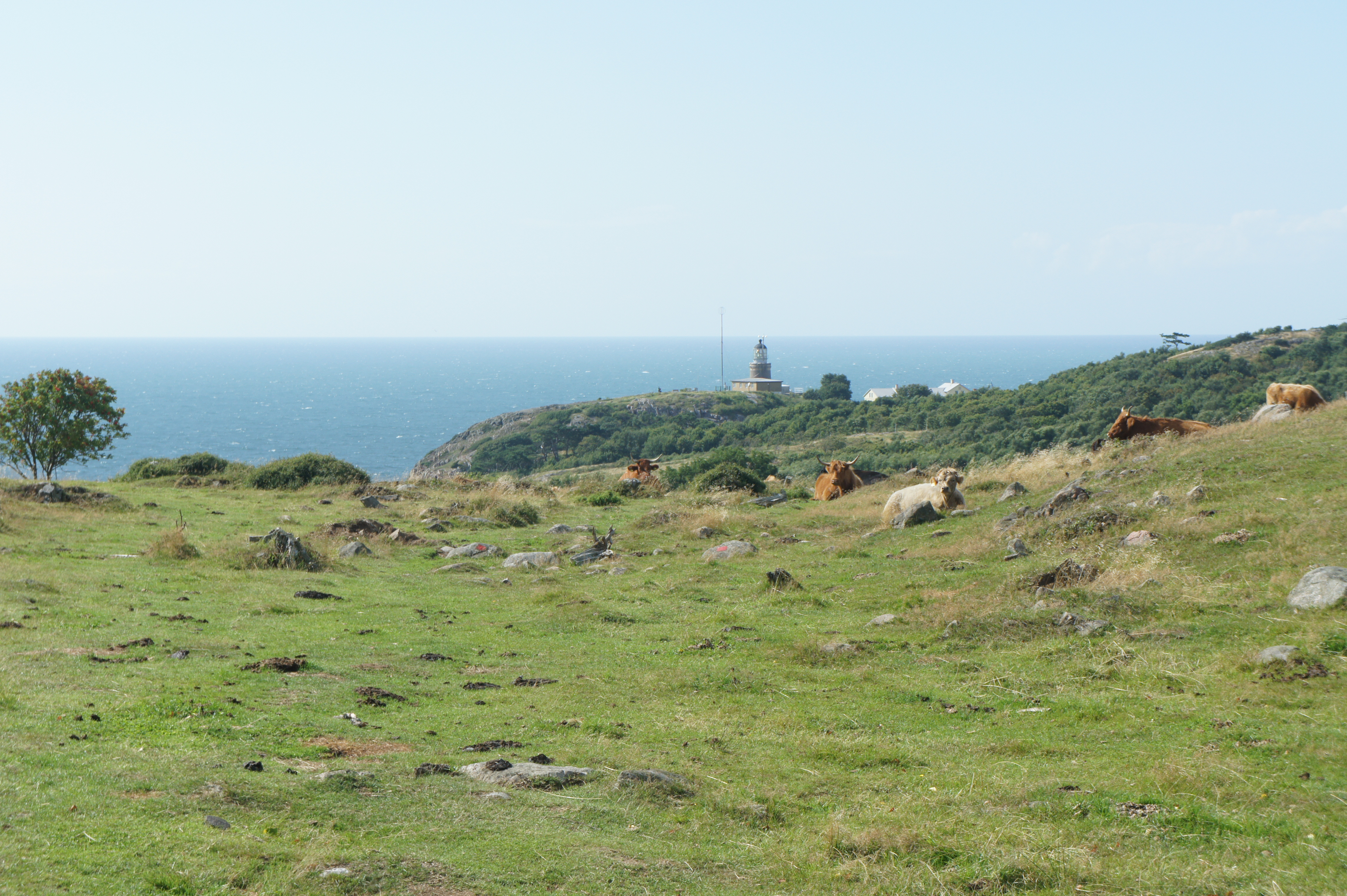
Grazing cattle on the seaside fell meadows

The principal habitats include broadleaf deciduous forest and coniferous forest, specialized cliff habitat and marine habitat including intertidal zone. In the clear sea waters can be found crustaceans, sea urchins, mussels, snails and a variety of ocean fishes. The rocky shoreline creates a natural environment for numerous tidepools that form at the cliff bases. In addition, freshwater marshes cover approximately five percent of the peninsula.

Principal broadleaf trees include elm, ash, birch, beech and oak. The habitats are particularly varied since each direction of cliff face into the ocean (about 270 degrees in all) generating a slightly different microclimate exposure and hence a unique habitat. Not surprisingly then there are a number of rare plants present including keeled garlic and wild marjoram; the rare plant, grass pea or varvial (Lathyrus sphaericus) occurs only within Sweden at Kullaberg and one other location.

== Birdlife ==
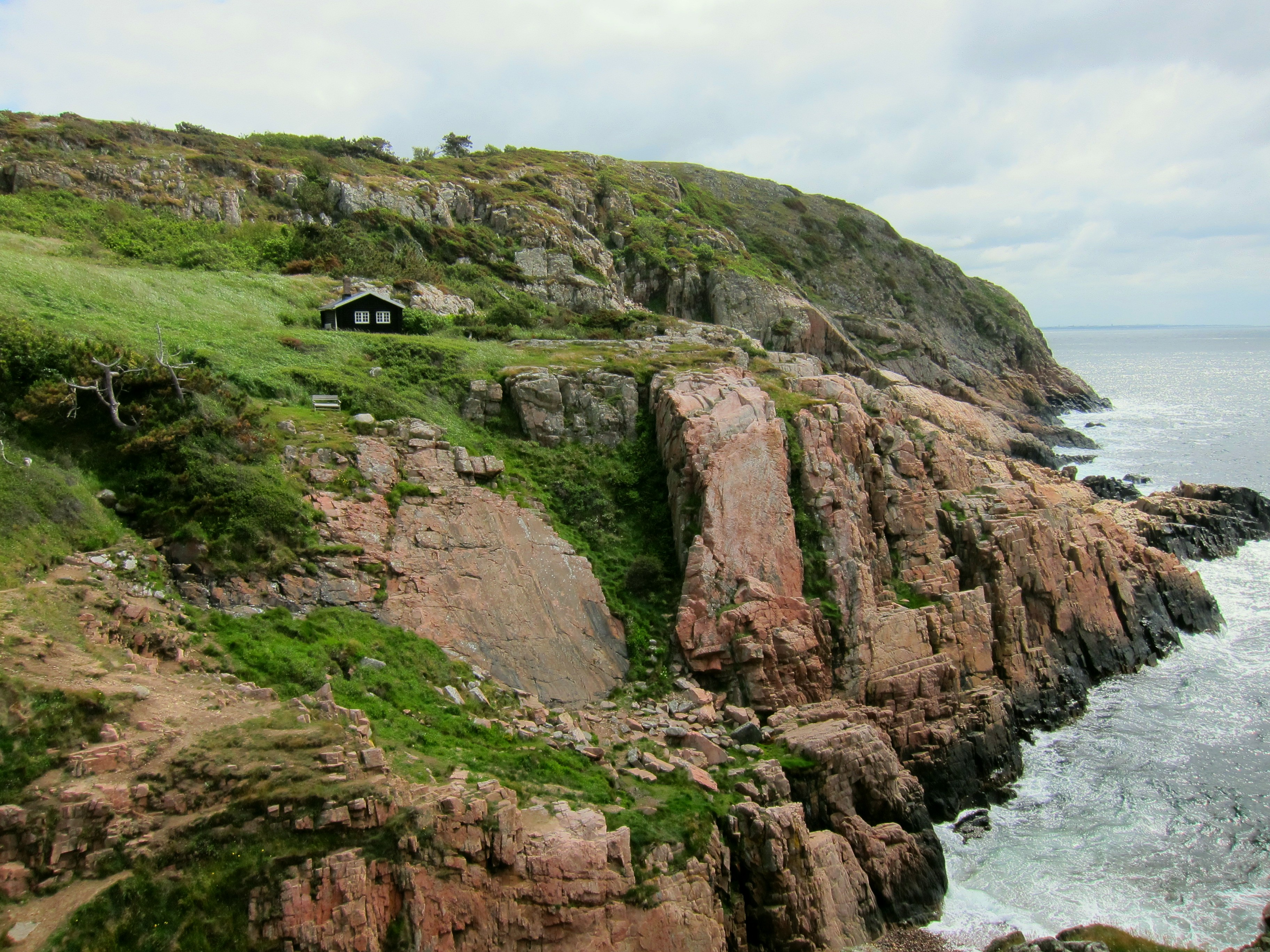
Coastal cliffs

It is the rich avafauna that have primarily been responsible for the designations of IBA and SPA. Part of this IBA is a recognized international IBA. A variety of pelagic birds as well as terrestrial birds find their homes at Kullaberg. The preserve is a significant wintering and passage area for a number of seabirds and seaduck, including common eider (Somateria mollissima), common scoter (Melanita nigra), velvet scoter (Melanita fusca), common goldeneye (Bucephala clangula), and black guillemot (Cepphus grylle).

The rare red kite (Milvus milvus) finds good habitat for one or two breeding pairs (as of 1996) in this specialized coastal habitat of Kullaberg and causes the site to meet IBA criteria B3 and C6. The common guillemot, (Uria aalge), is found here, with the 1996 census recording 50 to 500 pairs, but not as a breeding location; although the habitat is considered marginal for this bird, criteria B1ii and C3 are nevertheless met. Further in the 1996 census 20 to 30 pairs of red-backed shrikes were noted at Kullaberg; while this shrike breeds here, with habitat value rated as medium, item C6 is met of the listing criteria.

== Practical information ==
A paved road exists between the town of Mölle and a car park near the western tip of Kullaberg in the vicinity of the lighthouse. Along this road there are several other car park opportunities and a variety of trailheads leading to the numerous cliff paths and beach coves. Alternatively one may access hiking trails from the town of Molle itself or take a small boat from the harbour in Molle.

== Trivia ==
- In the 1980s controversial wood sculptures called Nimis were constructed from driftwood, situated in one of the cove areas. While some people consider this an artistic addition to the nature reserve, others consider it unappealing and the sculptures were the subject of legal dispute over their removal. This dispute resulted in the founding of the micronation Ladonia.
- The Swedish family of Kullenberg takes its name from Kullaberg, where the first known member of the family lived in the 16th century.

== See also ==
- Dolomite
- Rocky shore
