= List of Swedish women artists =

This is a list of women artists who were born in Sweden or whose artworks are closely associated with that country.

== A ==
- Kerstin Abram-Nilsson (1931–1998), painter
- Lena Ackebo (born 1950), cartoonist
- Emma Adbåge (born 1982), illustrator and children's writer
- Louise Adelborg (1885–1971), porcelain designer and textile artist
- Maria Adelborg (1849–1940), textile artist
- Ottilia Adelborg (1855–1936), illustrator and children's writer
- Ulla Adlerfelt (1736–1765), painter
- Sofia Adlersparre (1808–1862), painter
- Märta Afzelius (1887–1961), textile artist and designer
- Karin Ageman (1899–1950), designer, illustrator, poster artist
- Anna Agnér (1896–1977), Swedish painter
- Sofia Ahlbom (1823–1868), lithographer, engraver
- Lea Ahlborn (1829–1891), printmaker
- Gerda Ahlm (1869–1956), painter and art conservator
- Ester Almqvist (1869–1934), Expressionist painter
- Margareta Alströmer (1763–1816), painter
- Hjördis Piuva Andersson (born 1933), painter, writer
- Karin Mamma Andersson (born 1962), painter
- Maja Andersson Wirde (1873–1952), textile artist
- Charlotta Arfwedson (1776–1862), painter
- Elise Arnberg (1826–1891), miniaturist and photographer
- Alma Arnell (1857–1934), painter
- Efva Attling (born 1952), silversmith

== B ==
- Barbro Bäckström (1939–1990), sculptor
- Eva Bagge (1871–1964), painter
- Inge Bagge (1916–1988), sculptor and painter
- Jane Bark (1931–2023), illustrator
- Signe Barth (1895–1982), painter, art educator
- Jeanna Bauck (1840–1926), painter
- Julia Beck (1853–1935), painter and calligrapher
- Dagmar Beling (1929–2023), painter and art historian
- Carolina Benedicks-Bruce (1856–1935), sculptor
- Siri Berg (1921–2020), Swedish-American painter
- Elisabeth Bergstrand-Poulsen (1887–1955), writer, painter, illustrator
- Beata Bergström (1921–2016), photographer
- Elsa Beskow (1874–1953), painter
- Johanna Emerentia von Bilang (1777–1857), miniaturist
- Anna Billing (1849–1927), landscape and still-life painter
- Johanna Billing (born 1973), conceptual artist
- Eva Billow (1902–1993), children's writer and illustrator
- Elsa Björkman-Goldschmidt (1888–1982), writer and lithographer
- Sigrid Blomberg (1863–1941), sculptor
- Anna Boberg (1864–1935), painter, ceramist, textile artist
- Eva Bonnier (1857–1909), painter
- Lena Börjeson (1879–1976), sculptor, educator
- Vivianna Torun Bülow-Hübe (1927–2004), silversmith
- Agnes Börjesson (1827–1900), painter
- Agnes Branting (1862–1930), textile artist
- Fanny Brate (1861–1940), painter
- Maj Bring (1880–1971), painter
- Johanna Brunsson (1846–1920), textile artist and educator
- Arvida Byström (born 1991), photographer

== C ==
- Anna Camner (born 1977), painter
- Nina Canell (born 1979), sculptor, installation artist
- Margareta Capsia (1682–1759), Swedish-Finnish painter, altarpiece decorator
- Kerstin Cardon (1843–1924), portrait painter
- Mina Carlson-Bredberg (1857–1943), painter
- Christina Elisabeth Carowsky (1745–1797), painter
- Maria Carowsky (1723–1793), painter
- Anna Casparsson (1861–1961), textile artist, embroiderer
- Marja Casparsson (1901–1993), painter
- Anna Cassel (1860–1937), painter
- Charlotta Cedercreutz (1736–1815), painter
- Charlotta Cederström (1760–1832), painter
- Elsa Celsing (1880–1974), Russian-Swedish painter
- Emma Chadwick (1855–1932), painter
- Moki Cherry (1943–2009), interdisciplinary artist and designer
- Ludmila Christeseva (born 1978), Belarus-born Swedish visual artist
- Brita von Cöln (died 1707), painter
- Lena Cronqvist (1938–2025), painter, graphic artist and sculptor

== D ==
- Elsie Dahlberg-Sundberg (1916–2005), sculptor and medalist
- Kajsa Dahlberg (born 1973), contemporary artist
- Ibe Dahlquist (1924–1996), silversmith
- Siri Derkert (1888–1973), painter, sculptor
- Ingrid Dessau (1923–2000), textile artist
- Nathalie Djurberg (born 1978), video artist
- Brita Drewsen (1887–1983), textile artist active in Denmark
- Fredrika Eleonora von Düben (1738–1808), textile artist
- Lotten von Düben (1828–1915), early amateur photographer

== E ==
- Inger Edelfeldt (born 1956), author, illustrator
- Anna Maria Ehrenstrahl (1666–1729), painter
- Marianne Ehrenström (1773–1867), painter
- Karin Ek (born 1944), painter
- Thérèse Ekblom (1867–1941), illustrator
- Annika Ekdahl (born 1955), textile artist
- Märta af Ekenstam (1880–1939), silversmith and metal worker
- Marie-Louise Ekman (born 1944), filmmaker, painter
- Emma Ekwall (1838–1925), painter
- Ester Ellqvist (1880–1918), painter
- Pye Engström (born 1928), sculptor
- Eva Eriksson, (born 1949), illustrator
- Lisa Erlandsdotter (1774–1854), tapestry artist
- Anna Erlandsson (born 1956), illustrator, animator
- Bengta Eskilsson (1836–1923), textile artist
- Ulla Eson Bodin (1935–2009), textile artist and designer
- Princess Eugénie of Sweden (1830–1889), amateur artist

== F ==
- Greta Fahlcrantz (1889–1978), painter and sculptor
- Ingrid Falk (born 1960), painter, photographer
- Fanny Falkner (1891–1963), actress, miniaturist
- Mollie Faustman (1883–1966), modernist painter, illustrator and journalist
- Emy Fick (1876–1959), textile artist and businesswoman
- Anna Fiske (born 1964), illustrator, now in Norway
- Edith Fischerström (1881–1967), painter, woodcutter and sculptor
- Maja Fjæstad (1873–1961), painter, textile artist and engraver
- Christina Fredenheim (1762–1841), painter, singer
- Maria Friberg (born 1966), painter, photographer
- Anna Friberger (born 1944), illustrator, set designer
- Emma Fürstenhoff (1802–1871), artist, florist

== G ==
- Märtha Gahn (1881–1973), textile artist
- Anna Gardell-Ericson (1853–1939), painter
- Esther Gehlin (1892–1949), Danish-Swedish painter and textile artist
- Margareta Christina Giers (1731–1796), painter
- Sofia Gisberg (1824–1926), textile artist, sculptor and educator
- Ida Gisiko-Spärck (1859–1940), landscape painter
- Elisabeth Glantzberg (1873–1951), textile artist
- Maria Johanna Görtz (1783–1853), florist painter
- Thyra Grafström (1864–1925), textile artist
- Brita Granström (born 1969), painter
- Marianne Greenwood (1916–2006), photographer
- Viola Gråsten (1910–1994), textile designer
- Maja Gunn (born 1978), fashion designer
- Carolina Gynning (born 1978), actress, jewelry designer, writer

== H ==
- Johanna Hald (born 1945), photographer and screenwriter
- Adélaïde Victoire Hall (1772–1844), Swedish-French painter
- Ellen Roosval von Hallwyl (1867–1952), painter, sculptor, composer
- Signe Hammarsten-Jansson (1882–1970), graphic artist, stamp designer
- Berta Hansson (1910–1994), painter, sculptor and textile artist
- Karin Hansson (born 1967), artist and researcher
- Sonja Härdin (born 1945), illustrator
- Annika von Hausswolff (born 1967), visual artist
- Snövit Hedstierna (born 1980), visual artist, performance artist, director
- Amalia von Helvig (1776–1831), artist, writer
- Elli Hemberg (1896–1994), painter and sculptor
- Nina Hemmingsson (born 1971), cartoonist
- Ester Henning (1887–1985), painter
- Helena Henschen (1940–2011), designer, writer
- Kakan Hermansson (born 1981), ceramicist, comedian
- Helena Hernmarck (born 1941), tapestry artist
- Brita Sofia Hesselius (1801–1866), probably the first professional female photographer in Sweden
- Anna Maria Hilfeling, (1713–1783), miniaturist
- Hanna Hirsch-Pauli (1713–1783), painter
- Sigrid Hjertén (1885–1948), modernist painter
- Gerda Höglund (1878–1973), painter specializing in sacred art
- Marie Höglund (born 1955), glass artist
- Siv Holme (1914–2001), painter, sculptor
- Rose-Marie Huuva (born 1943), textile artist, poet
- Ulrica Hydman Vallien (1938–2018), stained glass artist and ceramist

== I ==
- Helena Sophia Isberg (1819–1875), woodcut artist

== J ==
- Selma Jacobsson (1841–1899), photographer
- Eva Jancke-Björk (1882–1981), ceramist, painter, textile artist
- Kristina Jansson (born 1967), contemporary artist
- Rosa Lie Johansson (died 2004), Swedish-Mexican painter
- Arnrid Johnston (1895–1972), sculptor, illustrator
- Ellen Jolin (1854–1939), painter
- Erika Jonn (1865–1931), painter
- Lina Jonn (1861–1896), photographer
- Maria Jonn (1855-1910), photographer and businesswoman
- Märta Jörgensen (1874–1967), folk costume designer

== K ==
- Brita-Kajsa Karlsdotter (1816–1915), textile artist
- Elisabeth Charlotta Karsten (1789–1856), painter
- Sophie Karsten (1783–1862), painter, ballerina
- Elisabeth Keyser (1851–1898), painter
- Marie Kinnberg (1806–1858), painter and pioneering photographer
- Asa Kitok (1894–1986), Sami birch-root artisan
- Hilma af Klint (1862–1944), painter
- Caroline von Knorring (1841–1925), photographer
- Greta Knutson (1899–1983), modernist artist, writer
- Amalia Wilhelmina Königsmarck (1663–1740), painter
- Wilhelmina Krafft (1778–1828), painter and miniaturist
- Klara Kristalova (born 1967), sculptor
- Thora Kulle (1849–1939), textile artist and businesswoman

== L ==
- Gunilla Lagerbielke (1926–2013), textile artist
- Ava de Lagercrantz (1862–1938), portrait painter
- Wilhelmina Lagerholm (1826–1917), portrait and genre painter, photographer
- Annika Larsson (born 1972), video artist
- Karin Larsson (1859–1928), painter, designer
- Lisa Larson (born 1931), ceramicist
- Karin Larsson (1859–1928), painter and designer
- Adelaïde Leuhusen (1828–1923), painter, singer
- Klara Lidén (born 1979), contemporary artist
- Ingeborg Lindborg (1875–1950), painter
- Eva Lindström (born 1952), illustrator and writer
- Louise Lidströmer (born 1948), painter, sculptor
- Amalia Lindegren (1814–1891), painter, member of the Royal Swedish Academy of Arts
- Pija Lindenbaum (born 1955), illustrator, author, designer
- Tuija Lindström (1950–2017), Finnish-Swedish photographer
- Cecilia Lundqvist (born 1971), animator
- Katarina Löfström (born 1970), video artist
- Miryam Lumpini (born 1993), tattoo artist and painter

== M ==
- Märta Måås-Fjetterström (1873–1941), textile artist
- Charlotta Malm-Reuterholm (1768–1845), Finnish-Swedish painter, writer
- Stefania Malmsten (born 1967), art director, graphic designer and film producer
- Charlotte Mannheimer (1866–1934), painter
- Randi Marainen (born 1953), Sami silversmith and artist
- Britta Marakatt-Labba (born 1951), Swedish Sámi textile artist
- Beata Mårtensson-Brummer (1880–1956), ceramist, painter, teacher
- Ida Matton (1863–1940), sculptor
- Ulrika Melin (1767–1834), textile artist
- Kaisa Melanton (1920–2012), textile artist
- Ruth Milles (1873–1941), sculptor
- Aleksandra Mir (born 1967), visual artist
- Mandana Moghaddam (born 1962), visual artist
- Jeanette Möller (1825–1872), painter
- Coco Moodysson (born 1970), cartoonist
- Ise Morssing (1878–1969), sculptor
- Anna Munthe-Norstedt (1854–1936), painter

== N ==
- Catrine Näsmark (born 1970), painter, set designer
- Barbro Nilsson (1899–1983), textile artist
- Ida Göthilda Nilsson (1840–1920), sculptor
- Vera Nilsson (1888–1979), painter
- Anna Nordgren (1847–1916), painter and illustrator
- Anna Nordlander (1843–1879), painter
- Tekla Nordström (1856–1937), painter, engraver
- Jenny Nyström (1854–1946), painter, illustrator

== O ==
- Cilluf Olsson (1847–1916), textile artist
- Elisabeth Ohlson Wallin (born 1961), photographer
- Agda Österberg (1891–1987), textile artist
- Barbro Östlihn (1930–1995), painter

== P ==
- Anna Palm de Rosa (1859–1924), painter
- Karin Parrow (1900–1984), painter
- Ulrika Pasch (1735–1796), painter
- Anna Petrus (1886–1949), sculptor, graphic artist and designer

== Q ==
- Ann-Sophie Qvarnström (born 1958), illustrator, silversmith

== R ==
- Mathilda Ranch (1860–1938), photographer
- Siri Rathsman (1895–1974), surrealist artist
- Emma Rendel (born 1976), graphic novel artist
- Sofie Ribbing (1835–1894), painter
- Marianne Richter (1916–2010), textile artist
- Anna Riwkin-Brick (1908–1970), photographer
- Maria Röhl (1801–1875), portrait painter
- Lotten Rönquist (1864–1912), painter
- Gerda Roosval-Kallstenius (1864–1939), painter
- Joanna Rubin Dranger (born 1970), cartoonist, illustrator
- Celina Runeborg (1878–1977), painter
- Hannah Ryggen (1894–1970), Swedish-Norwegian textile artist

== S ==
- Anna Sahlström (1876–1956), painter and engraver
- Emma Schenson (1827–1913), photographer and painter
- Caroline Schlyter (born 1961), sculptor, installation artist
- Kristina Schmid (born 1972), photographer
- Anna Maria Schmilau (died 1725), tapestry artist
- Helene Schmitz (born 1960), photographer
- Ida von Schulzenheim (1859–1940), painter
- Anna Brita Sergel (1733–1819), textile artist
- Ann-Sofi Sidén (born 1962), visual artist
- Amanda Sidwall (1844–1892), painter, illustrator
- Henriette Sjöberg (1842–1915), painter, illustrator
- Josabeth Sjöberg (1812–1882), painter
- Ann Mari Sjögren (1918–2010), painter, illustrator
- Hilda Sjölin (1835–1915), photographer
- Rosalie Sjöman (1833–1919), photographer
- Monica Sjöö (1938–2005), painter, writer
- Maja Sjöström (1868–1961), textile artist
- Gudrun Slettengren-Fernholm (1909–1980), ceramicist and sculptor
- Emma Josepha Sparre (1851–1913), painter
- Wendela Gustafva Sparre (1772–1855), textile artist
- Evelina Stading (1803–1829), landscape painter
- Margareta Stafhell (1720–1762), chalcographist
- Pernilla Stalfelt (born 1962), children's writer and illustrator
- Sylvia Stave (1908–1994), silversmith
- Katharina Stenbeck (born 1987), contemporary artist and singer
- Birgitta Stenberg (1932–2014), illustrator, author
- Ulla Stenberg (1792–1858), textile artist
- Magdalena Margareta Stenbock (1744–1822), painter
- Gustava Johanna Stenborg (1776–1819), textile artist
- Annika Ström (born 1964), visual artist
- Minna Sundberg (born 1990), illustrator, cartoonist
- Harriet Sundström (1872–1961), painter
- Maja Synnergren (1891–1950), painter, illustrator
- Sigrid Synnergren (1894–1986), textile artist

== T ==
- Rosa Taikon (1926–2017), Swedish-Romani silversmith
- Astri Taube (1898–1980), sculptor
- Maria Tesch (1850–1936), photographer
- Anna Maria Thelott (1683–1710), engraver, illustrator, woodcut-artist and miniaturist painter
- Hildegard Thorell (1850–1930), painter
- Anna-Clara Tidholm (born 1946), children's writer, illustrator
- Marit Törnqvist (born 1964), Swedish-Dutch illustrator
- Cecilia Torudd (born 1942), cartoonist
- Joanna Troikowicz (born 1952), Polish-Swedish sculptor
- Ida Trotzig (1864–1943), photographer, ethnographer, Japanologist, painter and writer

== U ==
- Hedvig Ulfsparre, (1877–1963), textile collector
- Irène K:son Ullberg (1930–2022), painter
- Bea Uusma (born 1966), author, illustrator, physician

== V ==
- Bertha Valerius (1824–1895), painter, photographer

== W ==
- Elsa Danson Wåghals (1885–1977), Swedish visual artist
- Charlotte Wahlström (1849–1924), painter
- Gerda Wallander (1860–1926), painter
- Berit Wallenberg (1902–1995), archaeologist, art historian, photographer
- Bianca Wallin (1909–2006), painter
- Elin Wallin (1884–1969), painter
- Carin Wästberg (1859–1942), textile artist
- Wilhelmina Wendt (1896–1988), silversmith
- Maria Widebeck (1858–1929), textile artist
- Agnes Wieslander (1873–1934), painter
- Ilon Wikland (born 1930), illustrator
- Helena Willis (born 1964), illustrator, writer
- Hanna Winge (1838–1896), painter
- Stina Wirsén (born 1968), illustrator, writer
- Gunilla Wolde (1939–2015), writer, illustrator
- Stina Wollter (born 1964), painter, illustrator

== Z ==
- Lilli Zickerman (1858–1949), textile artist

== See also ==
- Hall of Femmes
- List of Scandinavian textile artists
