= IKU =

Iku or IKU may refer to:

== Languages ==
- Iku language (ISO 639: ikv), a Plateau language of Nigeria
- Arhuaco language (ISO 639: arh), also known as Ikʉ, a Chibchan language of Colombia
- Inuktitut (ISO 639: iku), an Inuit language of Canada

== Movies ==
- The Curse of Iku, a 1918 American drama film
- I.K.U., a 2001 Japanese erotic cyberpunk film

== People ==
- Shō Iku (尚 育; 1813–1847) king of the Ryukyu Kingdom
- Iku (singer), a Japanese singer
- Iku Takenaka, (竹中郁, 1904–1982) Japanese poet
- Iku-Shamagan (𒄿𒆪𒀭𒊭𒈠𒃶, i-ku-Dsha-ma-gan, fl. c. 2500 BC) King of the second Mariote kingdom

== Places ==
- Istanbul Kültür University (İKÜ), in Istanbul, Turkey

== Other uses ==
- Iku Nagae, a character from Scarlet Weather Rhapsody in the Touhou Project series
- Iku-Turso (disambiguation)
- Irène K:son Ullberg (born 1930), Swedish painter
- Issyk-Kul International Airport, Kyrgyzstan (IATA: IKU)
- Iku, the personification of death and head of the Ajogun (malevolent deities) in the Yoruba religion
- Iku Suto, a character from The 100 Girlfriends Who Really, Really, Really, Really, Really Love You
