= GOTV (disambiguation) =

Get out the vote, or GOTV, is the effort of a political campaign to increase voter participation.

GOTV may also refer to:

- Gathering of the Vibes, a music festival
- GoTV (Austrian channel), an Austrian music channel
- Counter Strike: Global Offensive TV, a broadcast partner of Counter Strike: Global Offensive
- GOtv, a digital terrestrial television platform operated by MultiChoice that broadcasts in 11 African countries
