= Siv Holme =

Swedish artist (1914–2001)

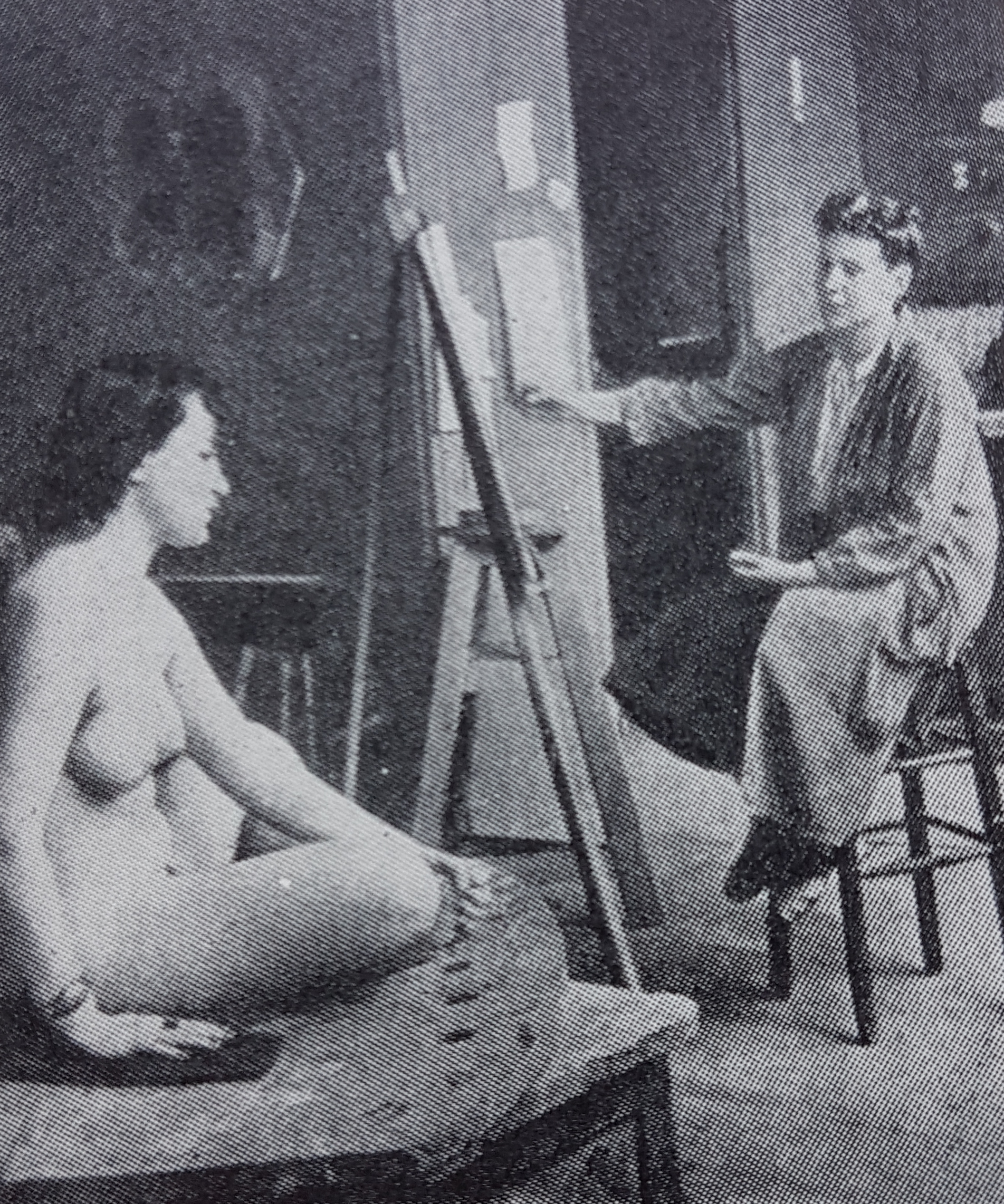
- Siv Holme sketching a nude Parisian woman
- Born: 27 June 1914; Uppsala county, Sweden
- Died: 5 December 2001 (aged 87); Silly-Tillard, France
- Education: New Painting School, Académie de la Grande Chaumière, Académie Colarossi, and Académie des Beaux-Arts
- Occupations: Painter, Sculptor
- Spouse(s): Ali Farkas, Isaac Muse
- Children: Marya Muse, Bjarne Muse

Elisif "Siv" Ingeborg Muse Holme (27 June 1914 – 5 December 2001) was a Swedish painter and sculptor.

== Personal life ==
Holme was born in Uppsala county, Sweden, to parents Edward and Molin Holme. Her father was a sea captain and harbor master in Skutskär, belonging to the Skutskärs parish where Siv Holme was born. Training at the New Painting School, Holme studied under the artistic care of Nils Adler-Laurentsson before moving to Paris in 1936 to attend the Académie de la Grande Chaumière, Académie Colarossi, and Académie des Beaux-Arts in the studios of Othon Friesz and André Lhote. In 1937 Holme married her first husband, the Hungarian journalist and author Ali Farkas. Later, between the years 1946 and 1947, Holme met the American artist Isaac "Ike" Lane Muse (1906–1996); an encounter resulting in his third marriage and her second. The pair eventually moved to Silly-Tillard after WWII, a small commune in northern France, where they had two children (Marya and Bjarne) and lived the remainder of their lives.

== Career in Europe ==
Holme worked in a variety of media including pen, ink, oils, gouache, charcoal, and was a practiced etcher and sculptor. Holme's painting and sculpture works exhibited widely across Sweden, having shown in Gävle, Uppsala, and Stockholm art galleries with special critical attention afforded to her portraiture. Swedish author Karin Bong notes how Holme received many beautiful praises for her art. Her portrait of the Hungarian author Mikas is painted with fine value perception and exquisite characteristics, it is an interesting and living person who looks at us from the canvas.

Holme collaborated with many international organizations, in demand for her hand-made medallions often finished with a layer of special patina. In 1996, UNESCO commissioned Holme to construct the organization's first-ever commemorative medal, a metallic token to celebrate their 20th anniversary.

IBM, similarly, commissioned Holme to produce a medal honoring the company's local employees after 10 years of service. The silver coins, struck by the Administration des Monnaies et Médailles, reflected her impressions of contemporary Paris on one side, and the world of high technology on the other.

Much of Holme's surviving works are now held by the National Museum in Stockholm, Sweden.

== Exhibitions ==
=== Paris ===
- Salon d'Automne, since 1937
- Salon des Independents, 1937 – 1939
- Institut Tessin, 1946, solo exhibition, sponsored by Jean Cassou, Yvon Bizardel, and the Swedish Ambassador, Erik Boheman

=== New York ===
- Mortimer Brandt Gallery, 1945
- Bonestell Gallery, 1946, solo exhibition
- Bertha Schaefer Gallery, 1947, 1948, solo exhibitions

== See also ==
- List of 20th century women artists
- List of Swedish painters
- List of Swedish woman artists
