= Tyra Kleen =

Swedish artist and author (1974-1951)

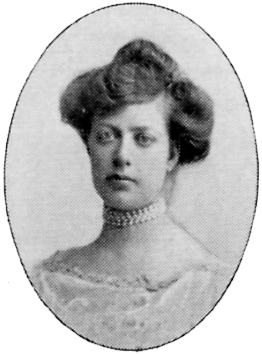
Portrait of Tyra Kleen ca 1900, photographer unknown

Tyra Kleen (29 March 1874 – 17 September 1951) was a Swedish artist, author and women's rights activist. Her paintings, illustrations, lithographs and publications were important to the Swedish fin de siècle art movement. But above all she was an independent ethnographical researcher.

== Biography ==
=== Childhood and education ===
Tyra Kleen was born in Sweden to Swedish diplomat and author Fredrik Herman Rikard Kleen (1841–1923) and Maria Charlotte Amalia née Wattrang (1842–1929). She had two siblings; an older brother Nils Rikardsson af Kleen (1872–1965) and sister Ingeborg Kleen (1870–1911). Due to the frequent absence of the parents, the children were primarily educated by their grandfather, Marshall Nils Adolf Wattrang, who died in 1890 when Kleen was 16 years old.

Kleen studied painting in Karlsruhe between 1892 and 1893, at the Academy of Fine Arts Munich 1894 and then at Académie Delecluse, Académie Colarossi, Académie Julian and Académie Vitti between 1895 and 1897. She devoted her work mainly to drawing, etching and lithography, held her first exhibition in Paris in 1896 and made her debut in illustration in 1897. In Paris she illustrated the book Drömmer translated by her sister from the book Dreams, written by the South-African author Olive Schreiner. Her figurative style was inspired by Art Nouveau, jugendstil and symbolism. During her years abroad with influences from artists such as Böcklin and Puvis de Chavannes and from Theosophy, she picked up a continental symbolistic style, unique among Swedish artists.

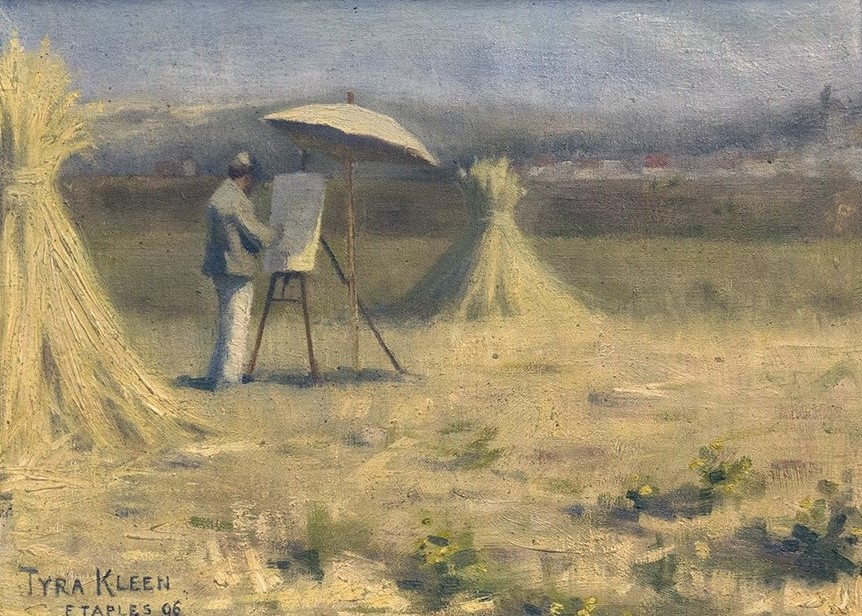
The painting "Etaples, Frankrike" that Tyra Kleen painted in Northern France in 1896.

As an adolescent, Kleen felt as though she was an outsider, not connected with her social surroundings. She filled this existential void not only with her professional ambitions but also with the theosophical-inspired world of oriental myths and rituals and tried to be part of it by dancing and drawing what she saw. Her cognitive, mental and emotional conceptions were inspired by feminism, the "New Woman"; and by exotism, especially the Theosophical mysticism of Annie Besant, Jiddu Krishnamurti and Charles Webster Leadbeater. The latter founded the Orde van de Ster in het Oosten (a so-called mixed non-Masonic lodge), which became very popular in the Netherlands and the Dutch East Indies.

=== Europe ===
When she moved to Rome in 1898 because she was not accepted in Paris by the Theosophic movement, she joined a theosophical society in Rome and attended its meetings and lectures. She befriended writers like Anna Maria Roos and Mary Karadjia.

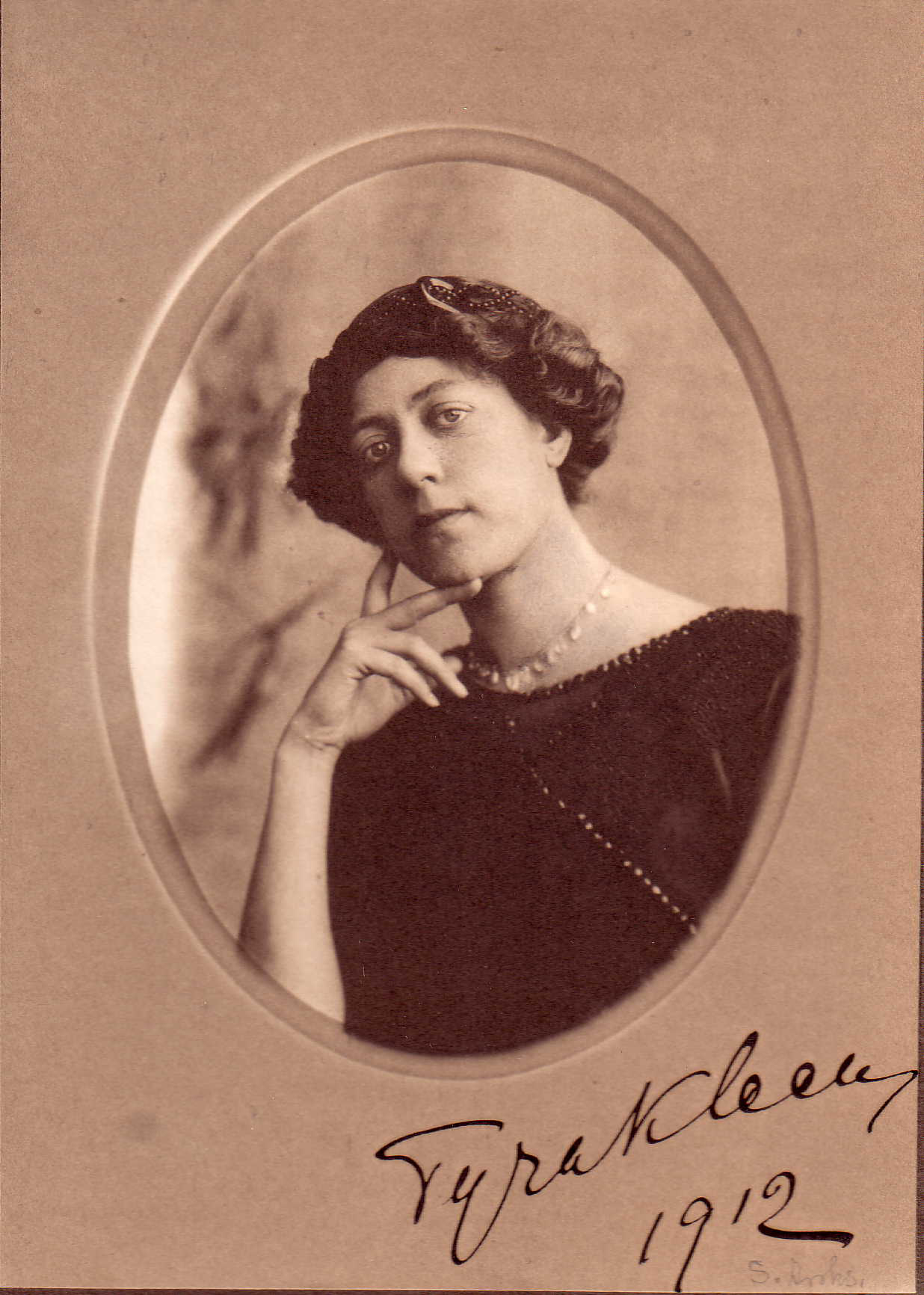
Tyra Kleen in 1912

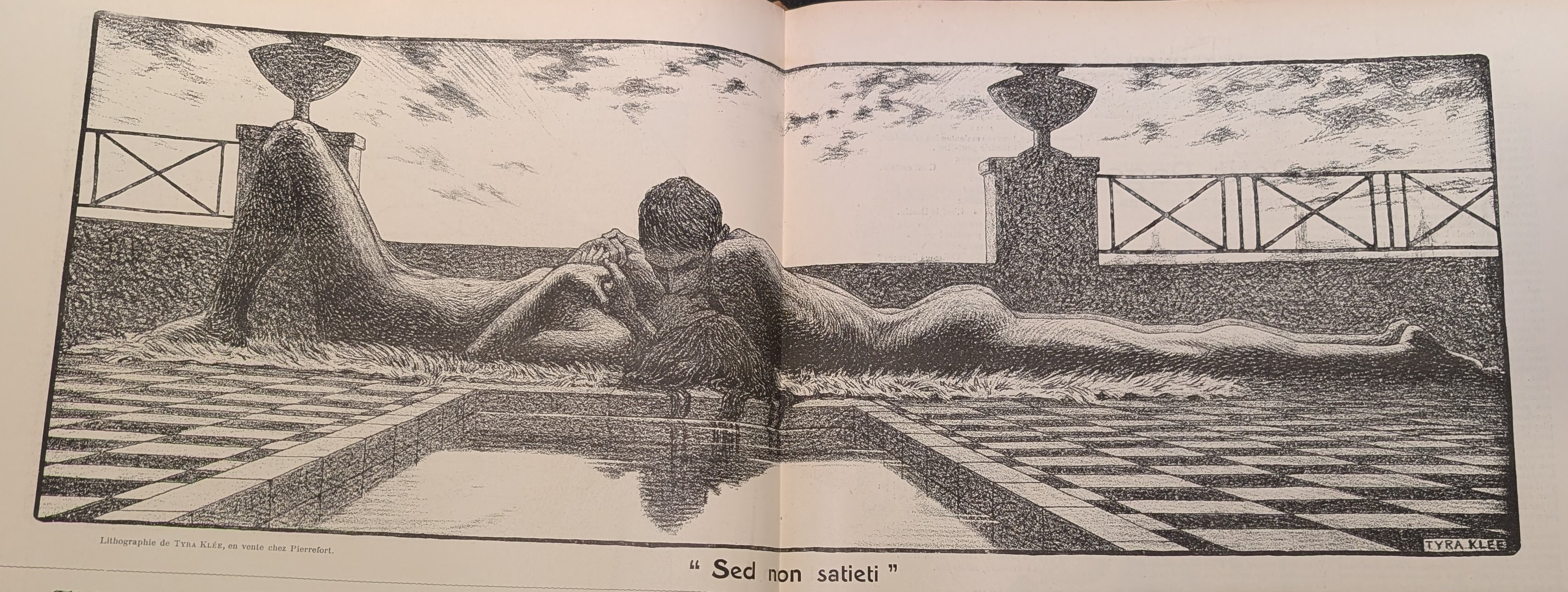
Tyra Kleen, Sed non satieti, 1905, lithograph, published in Le Courrier Français, 27 April 1905

She spent ten years in Rome as part of the contemporary cultural elite. She met Anders and Emma Zorn, Ellen Key, Carl Milles, Hjalmar Söderberg and Ottilia Adelborg; and later also went to live in Berlin and Paris. She traveled extensively, in 1910 to India and Ceylon and in 1919–1921 in Java and Bali, where she studied dance, being inspired in Paris by the performances of Mata Hari. She exhibited her work in Berlin, Vienna, Milan, Rome, Paris, London and St. Petersburg. She visited the Caribbean and the United States and organized an exhibition in New York in 1917. Kleen was very well equipped in organising and networking using contacts and relatives in the world of diplomacy, freemasonry, theosophy, feminism and the local magistry. She excelled at becoming intimate with people who could be useful for her career.

=== Asia ===
In 1919, after WWI, she traveled to Java and Bali on a Swedish cargo ship. In Solo (Surakarta), Kleen worked with Beata van Helsdingen-Schoevers to write an anthropological study on the ritual court dances of Solo. Both also participated in the dance lessons. Kleen felt that dancing not only involved making the right movements on the sound of music, but that it also involved the transition into an altered state of mind to become in harmony not only with oneself, but with the Universe.

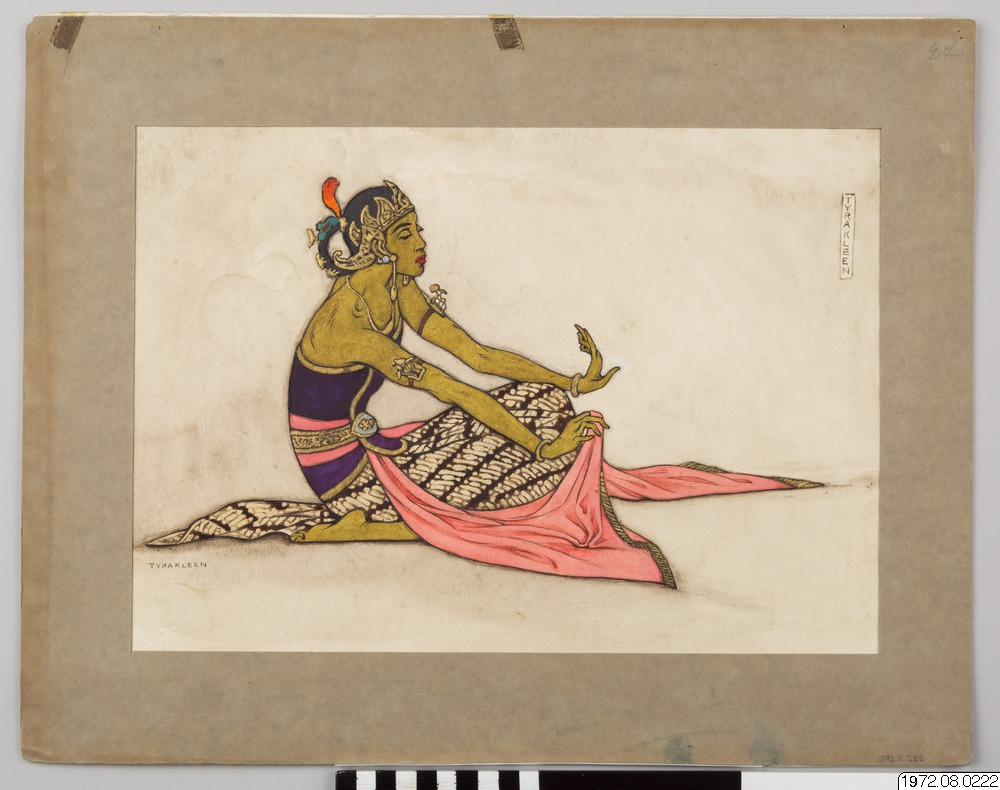
Female serimpi dancer from the Surakarta Court, ca 1920, Illustration made for the Beata van Helsdingen Schoever book project "Het Serimpi Boek" 1925.

Unfortunately, this project ended in July 1920 in turmoil due to clashing personalities, and van Helsdingen-Schoevers died 17 August 1920 of an unknown disease. The project was finished in 1925 with help from Volkslectuur (the commission of folk literature), Mabel Fowler and Miss Gobée, wife of the Head of the Office for Internal Affairs, titled "The Serimpi and Bedojo Dances at the Court of Surakarta", with 16 pages of text. In July 1925 there appeared a new edition with 30 pages of text. The coloured plates were reproductions made by the Topographic Service of Kleen's drawings. For everyone involved, but especially Kleen, the result was very disappointing, because she wanted to participate in the project in order to result in a standard reference work that could be presented worldwide.

When she arrived in Bali in 1920, she started a new project on the mudras, or ritual hand poses, of the Balinese Hindu priests with the assistance of the Rajah of Karangasem, Gusti Bagus Djilantik, whom she had met in Solo the year before, and of Piet de Kat Angelino. This was a turning point in her career because de Kat Angelino was able to explain to her the mudras and also encouraged the priests to cooperate. He was district-officer (controleur) of Gianjar and Klungklung for over a decade and had been collecting material on Balinese priests for years in his home in Gianjar. At his home, she could draw priests and their mudras. Their work together is presented in the book Mudras, with text and illustrations by Kleen, who acknowledged that much of the technical information about the poses and ceremonies came from de Kat Angelino and later on from R.Ng. Poerbatjaraka. Kleen spent the whole of 1921 in Java, working on the material collected in Bali the year before. She exhibited her pictures of the priests at the Art Society in Batavia. Collaboration with de Kat Angelino continued and she met him in Amsterdam on her way home. With his help, an exhibition was arranged at the Colonial Institute in Amsterdam. The exhibition was favorably reviewed by de Kat Angelino in the magazine Nederlandsch Indië, Oud en Nieuw.

Another crucial exhibition was Två vittberesta damer (Two Well-Traveled Ladies) at Liljevalch's Public Art Gallery in Stockholm 1922, where she showed art and artifacts from Java and Bali together with Swedish photographer and author Ida Trotzig contributing works from Japan. This exhibition was the starting point for the "Bali-fever" in Sweden. Kleen's depictions of mudras were shown at the Victoria and Albert Museum in 1923.

Besides Mudras, Kleen published two other books about Bali: Ni-Si-Pleng, a story about black children written for white children (1924), and, seven years later, Tempeldanser och musikinstrument pa Bali, printed in 300 numbered copies, translated in 1936 as The Temple Dances in Bali.

Kleen's study on the mudras, the exhibition in Amsterdam at the Colonial Institute and the publication of her books made her internationally known. For her scientific ethnographic work on Bali, Kleen was awarded the Johan August Wahlberg silver medal in April 1938, given to individuals who have "promoted anthropological and geographical science through outstanding efforts".

Walter Spies was the central figure in the circle of artists residing on the island in Ubud, Klungklung and Karangasem. He was considered to be the greatest expert on Balinese dance and drama. Together with the British dance critic Beryl de Zoete, he wrote the standard 1938 work Dance and Drama in Bali. Spies wrote a very critical nine-page review of the Temple Dances in Bali in the journal Djawa (1939). He complained, "the text and the depictions are filled with so many mistakes, errors and incorrect statements that one must shake one's head." Spies claimed that as an ethnographic document, the book has no value. After this critical review, there were nearly no references to the work of Kleen in any ethnographic periodicals or publications. It was only in 1962 that C. Hooykaas in his article "Saiva-Siddhanta in Java and Bali" supported the importance of the study on mudras by de Kat Angelino and Kleen.

Kleen contributed work to various European magazines, including Sluyters' Monthly, Nederlandsch Indië Oud en Nieuw, Ord och Bild and Inter-Ocean, between 1920 and 1925 and influenced the perception and expectations of foreign visitors to Bali. Furthermore, she and local artists in Bali mutually influenced each other's work. Mostly these local paintings were made for the touristic market and depicted daily life instead of exclusively being concerned with gods, demons and the Ramayana and Mahabharata epics. In this way, Kleen took part in the marketing of "the last paradise". This also meant that she became associated with this type of magazine drawing instead of her more important ethnographic publications.

=== Egypt ===
In 1926, Kleen visited Egypt to study the meanings of the different hand and foot movements depicted in the art, which resulted in her last publication in 1946 of the book Solens Son about pharaoh Echnaton.

=== Legacy ===
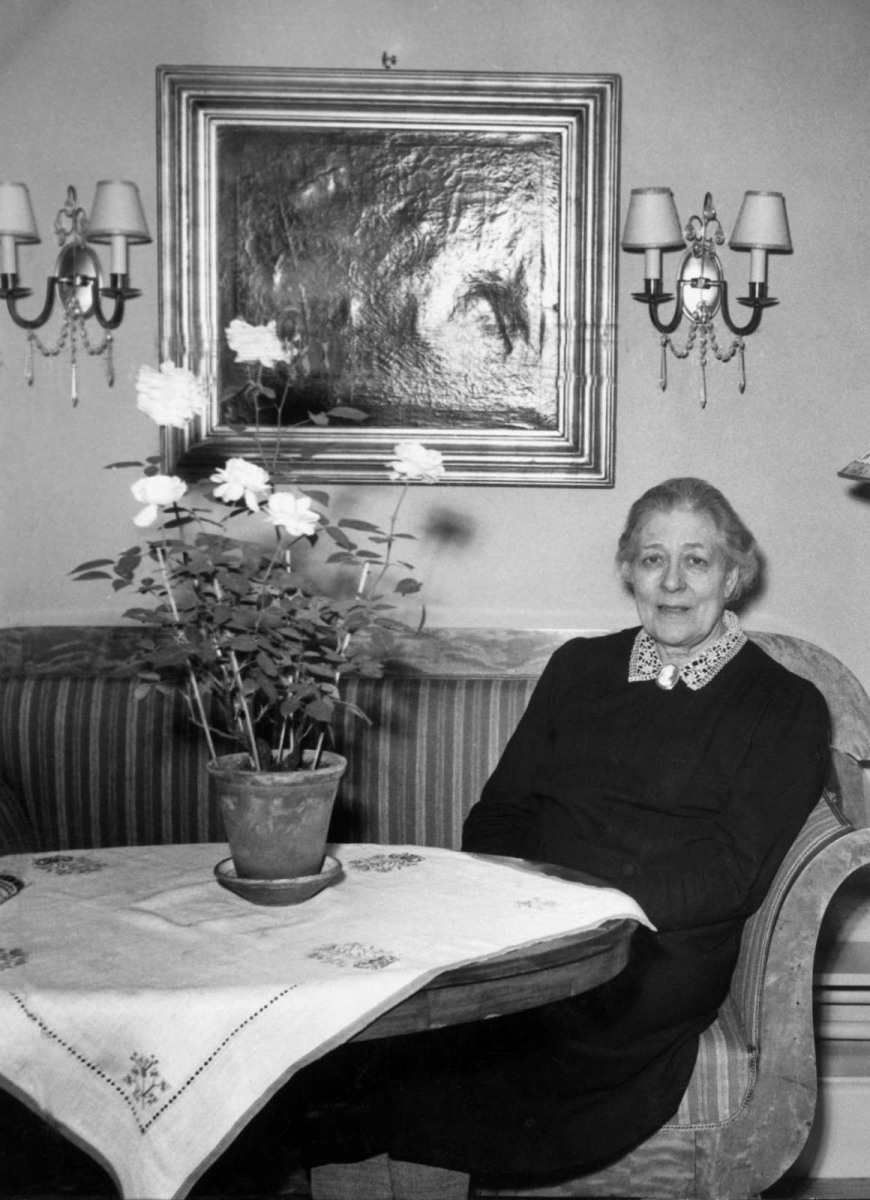
Tyra Kleen in the 1940s

Kleen left her collections to the Swedish House of Nobility on the condition that the archive would not be opened until 50 years after her death. In 2001, the paintings, lithographs, drawings, diaries and sketches were brought out and the private part of her collection was brought home to Valinge. Kleen is represented with art at, for instance, Gothenburg Museum of Art and Nationalmuseum in Stockholm. Archives from Kleen are also held by the Swedish National Museums of World Culture and by the family at the Valinge Estate in Jönâker in Nyköping where she spent her childhood years.

From her diaries and letters, Kleen appears to be a colourful and exciting androgynous personality. She stayed single throughout her life, but she had several romances and received many offers of marriage. She loved her freedom, and was reputed to have said, "I am a vagabond and an adventuress by birth and uncurbed habit." She was noted to be very ambitious, productive and particular in traveling and doing business. Reportedly, she had years-long correspondences with her feminist friends, but could drop people when she considered them no longer useful for her career or ambitions.

The Thiel Gallery in Stockholm showed the exhibition "Tyra Kleen: Artist, Vagabond, Adventuress" in summer 2018. In their catalogue they state: "Tyra Kleen fought against the obstacles to women artists. She stands out, with her unconventional life, as a fearless, multifaceted practitioner with an unusual ability to interweave dance, literature, activism and adventure with imagination and spiritual quests, into an exceedingly unique artistic oeuvre."

== Selected bibliography ==
- Lek: Frän Roms bohême-varld, Bonnier, 1900, written under the pseudonym Isis
- En psykesaga, Wählstrom & Widstrand, 1902, text and illustrations
- "Dansen som skön kunst", Mitt Hem, 15 November 1907 p. 425–427
- Light and Shadows, 1907
- Form, Stockholm: Nya Trickery-aktiebolaget 1908
- Strövtag i Orienten, Stockholm, Nordsteds 1911
- "Boro-Budur", Ord och bild, 1920 p. 272–276
- Traum der Berg, Rom 1911
- Olive Schreiner/Ingeborg Kleen, Drömmer, 1897, illustrations
- Johan Bergman "Sagan om Odysseus", Stockholm, 1906, illustrations
- P. de Kat Angelino, Mudra's op Bali: handhoudingen der priesters, 's Gravenhage, Adi-Poestaka, 1922, illustrations
- Beata van Helsdingen Schoevers Het Serimpi Book, Volkslectuur, Weltevreden, 1925, illustrations
- Mudrās: the Ritual Hand Poses of the Buddha Priests and the Shiva Priests of Bali, with a preamble by A.J.D. Campbell, Trübner & Co, London, 1924
- Ni-Si-Pleng: en historia um svarte barn, berättad och ritad för vita barn. J.A. Lindblads Förtag, Uppsala, 1924
- tempeldanser och musikinstrument pâ Bali, Nordisk rotogravyr, 1931
- Vajang, javanesk teater, Stockholm, Rotogravyr, 1930
- Temple Dances in Bali, Etnografiska museet, 1936
- Wajang, Javanese Theatre, Etnografiska museet, 1937
- Solens son, Stockholm, Gothia, 1946
