= Sjögren =

Sjögren is a Swedish surname. Notable people with the surname include:

- Anders Johan Sjögren (1794–1855), Finnish linguist, historian, ethnographer and explorer
- Ann Mari Sjögren (1918–2010), Swedish fantasy artist and illustrator
- Christer Sjögren (born 1950), Swedish singer
- Emil Sjögren (1853–1918), Swedish composer
- Henrik Sjögren (1899–1986), Swedish ophthalmologist, Sjögren's syndrome
- Hjalmar Sjögren (1856–1922), Swedish geologist and mineralogist
- John C. Sjogren (1916–1987), American soldier, Medal of Honor recipient
- John M. Sjogren (born 1966), American film director
- Karin Sjögren (born 1960), Swedish curler
- Katrin Sjögren (born 1966), Finnish politician from Åland
- Peder Sjögren (1905–1966), Swedish writer
- Peter Sjögren (born 1983), Swedish floorball goalkeeper
- Pontus Sjögren (born 1985), Swedish ice hockey player
- Thomas Sjögren (born 1968), Swedish ice hockey player
- Torsten Sjögren (1896–1974), Swedish psychiatrist and geneticist

== See also ==
- Sjögren shotgun, 12 gauge semi-automatic shotgun of Swedish origin
- Sjögren syndrome antigen B, a human protein which has been shown to interact with Nucleolin References
- Sjögren syndrome, an autoimmune diseases named after Swedish ophthalmologist Henrik Sjögren
- Sjögren–Larsson syndrome, an autosomal recessive form of ichthyosis apparent at birth
- Marinesco–Sjögren syndrome, a syndrome consisting of cerebellar ataxia, intellectual disability, congenital cataracts
- Rabén & Sjögren, a book publishing company in Sweden
