= Ö3 Austria Top 40 =

Austrian music chart

Logo of the radio Show "Ö3 Austria Top 40"

Ö3 Austria Top 40 is the official Austrian singles chart, as well as the radio show which presents it, aired on Mondays on Hitradio Ö3. The show presents the Austrian singles, ringtones and downloads chart. It premiered on 26 November 1968 as Disc Parade and was presented by Ernst Grissemann.

The weekly number-ones are released by Musikmarkt and GoTV.

== History ==
From 1980 to 7 January 1990, the mixed listening-and-sales parade "Hit wähl mit" ("Pick the Hit") was broadcast on Sunday evening, starting with an hour of 15 charting song and six new releases. The longest broadcast ran for two hours with 25 charting songs and eight new releases.

=== Ö3 Top-30 ===
On 12 January 1990, the pure sales hit parade Ö3 Top-30 was introduced on Ö3. It was presented by Udo Huber on Saturday evening from 6:00 p.m. to 8:00 p.m. and ran for two hours. The first number-one in the sales hit parade was the song "All Around the World" by Lisa Stansfield. The sales data collection as the basis for the shipment was carried out until the beginning of 1999 by the copyright company Austro Mechana, which is responsible for the license fees for the mechanical reproduction.

=== Ö3 Austria Top 40 ===
On 15 September 1995, the show was expanded to 40 songs. It now ran for three hours. From April 1999 the data was collected by Austro Mechana, since 2003 GfK Entertainment (founded as Media Control GfK International) has been creating the charts.

Udo Huber left the show on 10 January 1997. Martina Kaiser, Matthias Euler-Rolle, Gustav Götz, Benny Hörtnagl, Thomas Filzer, Elke Rock and Tarek Adamski then moderated the show for a few years each. The current presenters are Jana Petrik and Martin Ziniel, who have been hosting the programm since 2022.

Until 27 September 2019, the "Ö3 Austria Top 40" was broadcast on Fridays from 7 p.m. to 10 p.m. From 6 October 2019 to 28 February 2021, the show was on Sundays from 4 p.m. to 7 p.m. From 2 March 2021 to 2 September 2025, the show was on Tuesdays from 10 p.m. to midnight. Since 8 September 2025, the show has been on every Monday from 10 p.m. to midnight.

== Charts published ==
Four charts are currently published:

- Ö3 Austria Top 40 Singles – a Top 75 listing
- Ö3 Austria Top 40 Longplay (Albums) – a Top 75 listing
- Ö3 Austria Top 20 Compilation – includes releases by Diverse Interpreten (various artists)
- Ö3 Austria Top 10 DVD

=== Ö3 Austria Top 75 ===
The online version of the chart still lists 75 top positions, and is known by various outlets and presentations as Ö3 Austria Top 75, but still labels itself as Ö3 Austria Top 40, and broadcastings only mention the top 40, with the remaining positions (41 through 75) considered the "bubbling under".

== List of number one hits ==
- List of Austrian number-one hits

== Presenters ==
Between 1968 and 2007, the show had had a variety of names: Disc Parade, Die Großen 10 von Ö3, Pop Shop, Hit wähl mit, Die Großen 10 and Ö3 Top-30, before changing to the name used since then: Ö3 Austria Top 40.

Chart name	English	Presenters
Disc Parade		Ernst Grissemann, Rudi Klausnitzer
Die Großen 10 von Ö3	The Big 10 from Ö3	Rudi Klausnitzer, Hans Leitinger
Pop Shop		Hans Leitinger
Hit wähl mit	Pick the Hit	Hans Leitinger, Udo Huber
Die Großen 10	The Big 10	Udo Huber
Ö3 Top-30		Udo Huber
Ö3 Austria Top 40		Previously: Udo Huber, Martina Kaiser, Matthias Euler-Rolle, Gustav Götz, Benny Hörtnagl, Thomas Filzer, Elke Rock, Tarek Adamski; Currently: Jana Petrik, Martin Ziniel
