= Hjördís =

Mythical character

Hjördís or Hiordis in Norse mythology is the wife of Sigmund, and the mother of Sigurd. Her father was a king named Eylimi.

She is mentioned in the Poetic Edda and the Prose Edda.

It is also a female given name in Scandinavia, as Hjördis in Sweden and Iceland, and Hjørdis in Denmark and Norway, but has recently gained popularity as a female given name in Germany as Jördis.

== As a given name ==
- Hjördis Piuva Andersson, Swedish-Tornedalian painter and writer
- Hjördis "Disa" Eythorsdottir, Iceland-born American bridge player
- Hjørdis Høsøien, Norwegian handball player
- Hjördis Levin (born 1930), Swedish historian and author
- Hjördis Nordin, Swedish gymnast and Olympic champion
- Hjördis Petterson, Swedish actress
- Hjördis Schymberg, Swedish coloratura and lyric soprano
- Hjördis Töpel, Swedish freestyle swimmer and diver

== Other uses ==
- Hjørdis (TV series), a spin off of the Danish television series Rita
- Buxton Hjordis, a single-seat sailplane built by Slingsby Sailplanes Ltd.
