= Magnus Bogren =

Swedish ice hockey coach

- Born: August 8, 1972 (age 53); Nyhamnsläge, Sweden
- Occupation: Coach
- Employer: IF Björklöven
- Predecessor: Daniel Rahimi

Magnus Bogren (born August 8, 1972) is a Swedish ice hockey coach. He is currently the head coach of IF Björklöven in HockeyAllsvenskan after succeeding Daniel Rahimi on April 16, 2025.
