= Lindborg =

Lindborg is a surname. Notable people with the surname include:

- Ida Lindborg (born 1994), Swedish swimmer
- Ingeborg Lindborg (1875–1950), Swedish artist
- Sara Lindborg (born 1983), Swedish cross-country skier
- Nathalie Lindborg (born 1991), Swedish swimmer
