= Tesch =

Tesch is a surname. Notable people with the surname include:

- Al Tesch (1891–1947), American baseball player
- Bruno Tesch (1890–1946), German chemist
- Bruno Tesch (1913–1933), German anti-fascist executed by the Third Reich
- Cornelia Tesch, German figure skater
- Johanna Tesch (1875–1945), German politician
- Liesl Tesch (born 17 May 1969), Australian Paralympic wheelchair basketball player and politician
- Maria Tesch (1850–1936), Swedish photographer
- Silke Tesch (born 1958), German politician
- Willy Tesch, Swedish sprint canoer

== Places ==
- Tesch, Michigan, an unincorporated community
