= Katharina Stenbeck =

Swedish artist, designer, electronic musician, singer and YouTuber

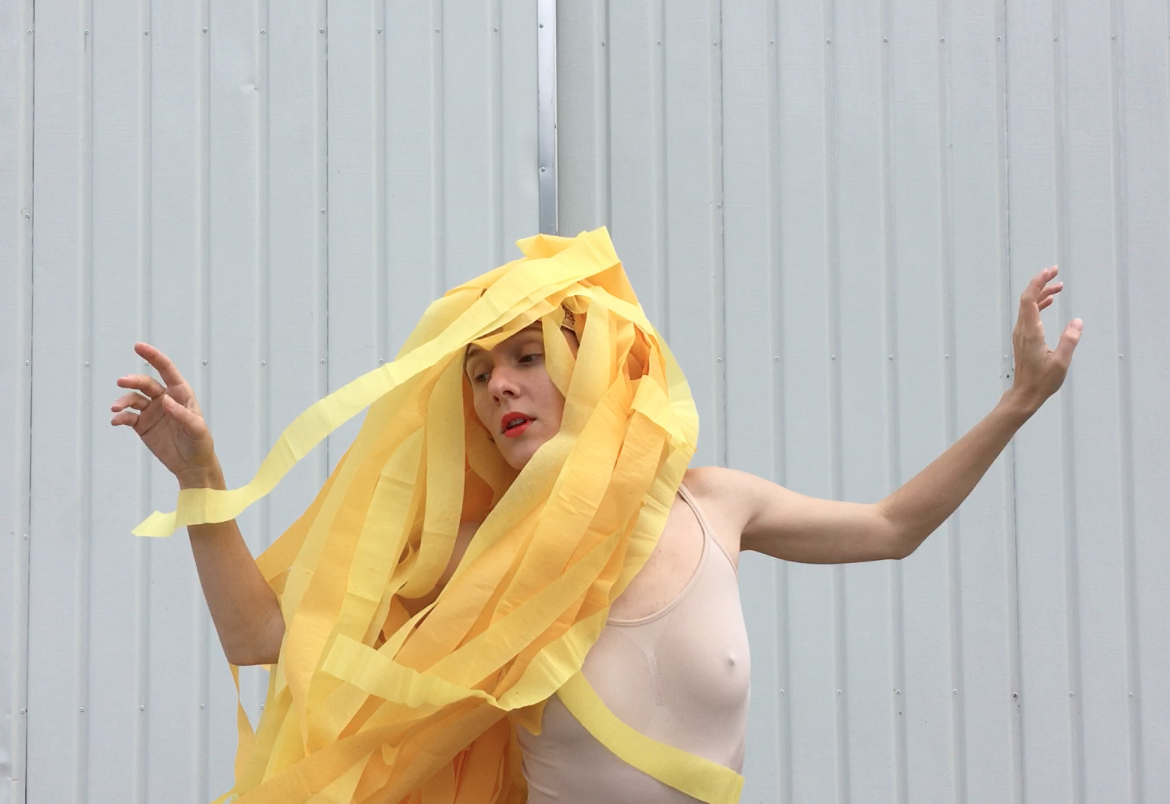
- Stenbeck in 2018
- Born: Katharina Alice Hilda Stenbeck; March 23, 1987 (age 39); Saltsjöbaden, Sweden
- Other name: Galleriet
- Occupations: Artist, electronic musician, singer
- Website: katharinastenbeck.com

Katharina Alice Hilda Stenbeck (born March 23, 1987) is a Swedish artist, electronic musician and singer.

== Early life and theatre ==
Stenbeck grew up in Saltsjöbaden outside Stockholm but also lived in London as a child. She studied theatre at Södra Latin in Stockholm before moving to New York City to attend The American Academy of Dramatic Arts from 2005 to 2008.

== Music ==
Stenbeck fronted the Brooklyn-based post-disco band Folding Legs from 2009 to 2015. In the spring of 2017, she launched Galleriet (Swedish pronunciation: [ɡalɛˈrǐːɛt], "The Gallery") and released her debut solo album, Romantic Gestures, later the same year. Three of the songs from the album, "Right Wavelength", "Homesick Lover" and "Juvenile", premiered on Swedish national radio in Musikguiden for Sveriges Radio P3. In 2018, she released the EP, Send Me Your Daughter.

Stenbeck, who self-produces all her work, employs the use of masks, audiovisual installations and other theatrical elements in her music videos and live performances.

== Art ==
Stenbeck is a self-taught artist. Her work spans a wide variety of mediums, including painting, papier-mâché sculpture, video installation, wearable art and stop motion animation.

She launched a YouTube channel in March 2019, on which she shares videos about her work. In August 2019, she launched an online store of housewares, accessories and artwork designed and created by Stenbeck in her studio. In the spring of 2021, her short film I Have Anxiety was exhibited at Liljevalchs Vårsalong in Stockholm.

== Personal life ==
Stenbeck currently splits her time between Los Angeles, California and Stockholm, Sweden.

== Discography ==
=== Albums ===
- Romantic Gestures (2017, self-released)

=== Extended plays ===
- Send Me Your Daughter (2018, self-released)

=== Singles ===
- Right Wavelength (2017, self-released)
- Homesick Lover (2017, self-released)
- Allting är som vanligt (2017, self-released)
- Senga (2018, self-released)

=== Music videos ===
- "Right Wavelength" directed by Katharina Stenbeck. The video premiered on GAFFA and received positive reviews on several blogs, with the song charting on Hype Machine.
- "Senga" directed by Katharina Stenbeck. The video premiered on Tom Tom Magazine and received several positive blog reviews, with the song once again charting on Hype Machine.

== Filmography ==
=== Short films ===
- I Have Anxiety (2021) – exhibited at Liljevalchs Vårsalong in Stockholm in the spring of 2021
