= Irène K:son Ullberg =

Swedish painter (1930–2022)

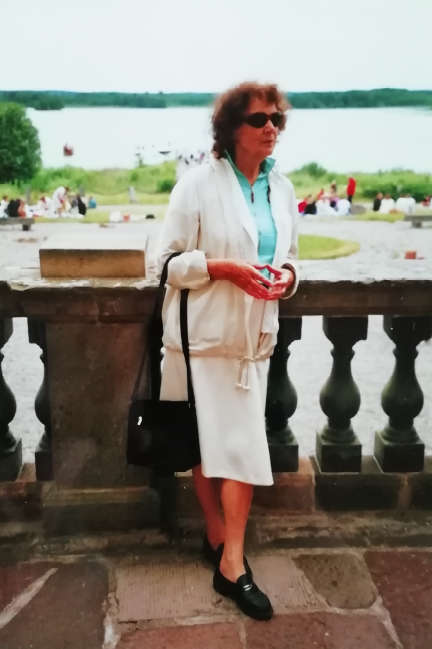
- K:son Ullberg in the 1990s
- Born: 12 June 1930; Strängnäs, Sweden
- Died: 24 December 2022 (aged 92)
- Known for: Painter
- Patrons: Endre Nemes, Torsten Renqvist
- Website: ireneksonullberg.com

Harriet Irène Elisabeth K:son Ullberg (born Harriet Irène Elisabeth Karlsson; 12 June 1930 – 24 December 2022) was a Swedish painter.

== Biography ==
K:son Ullberg grew up in Strängnäs, Sweden. She studied at the Valand Academy of Gothenburg. In 1962 she had her first exhibition in Göteborg. Following this, much of her career took place in Sweden and in France, as well as in Rome, Capri and Greece.

K:son Ullberg died on 24 December 2022, at the age of 92.

== Style ==
K:son Ullberg drew inspiration from Fauvism, Impressionism, Realism, and Expressionism. Her painting media include modes such as oil, watercolor, and graphic arts. A common characteristic of K:son Ullberg's art is her use of intense and vivid colors. K:son Ullberg developed a concept of art which she called Realism and Poetry.

Below are three of K:son Ullberg's paintings:

Parisnatt, 1970

Hänryckning av vanmakt

Monets trädgård

== Exhibitions ==
K:son Ullberg held exhibitions in multiple locations in Sweden and in France, some of which include the following:

- Galerie Larock-Granoff (formerly Galerie Katia Granoff) in Paris
- Galerie André Weil, Avenue Matignon, in Paris
- Involved in collective exhibitions at the Nationalmuseum in Stockholm, including Unga tecknare, Göteborgs konstförenings Decemberutställning at Göteborgs konsthall 1956, summer exhibition at Mässhallen in Gothenburg, Stockholmssalongerna at Liljevalchs konsthall, Sörmlandssalongerna in Katrineholm, Lunds konsthall, and Grand Palais in Paris, and the Swedish Cultural Center in Paris.
- Strängnäs Cathedral, exhibition Se, jag är världens ljus 16 May to 13 June 2021.

== Represented ==
K:son Ullberg is represented at

- Moderna Museet in Stockholm
- Gothenburg Museum
- Hälsinglands museum
- Swedish Cultural Center in Paris
- National Swedish Arts Council
- other districts and regions in Sweden.

== Awards ==
Some of K:son Ullberg's prizes include the following:

- 2nd place, Folkrörelsernas Konstfrämjande anordnad litografipristävling, 1957

== See also ==
- List of Swedish women artists
