= Buxton Hjordis =

British single-seat glider, 1935

Hjordis

General information
- Type: Competition sailplane
- National origin: United Kingdom
- Manufacturer: Slingsby Sailplanes
- Designer: G. M. Buxton
- Number built: 1

History
- First flight: 27 May 1935

The Buxton Hjordis was a single-seat sailplane built by Slingsby Sailplanes Ltd. in the UK to a design by G.M Buxton. Only one was constructed and was flown by Philip Wills at competitions in Europe between 1935-7.

== Development ==
The sole Buxton Hjordis was a high-performance sailplane designed by G.M "Mungo" Buxton and built in 1935 by Slingsby Sailplanes Ltd. It was a single-seater of all-wood construction. Its straight-tapered, cantilever wing was pedestal-mounted and was without flaps or airbrakes. The fuselage was circular in cross section with the cockpit immediately in front of the wing leading edge and a wheel-less, single-skid main undercarriage. Aft, the fuselage tapered to carry a very small triangular fin, on which was mounted a much taller, wide chord rudder of rounded triangular shape and with a vertical leading edge. The horizontal tail was small and essentially all elevator apart from a leading-edge hinge.

Buxton began the design of a development, the Hjordis 2 which was completed and built by Slingsby Aviation as the King Kite.

== Operational history ==
The Hjordis first flew on 27 June 1935. It had been designed and built for the well-known British glider pilot, Philip Wills, and he flew it at the British National Gliding Competitions at Sutton Bank in September 1935. He also flew it at the International Competition held between 14-47 July 1937 at the Wasserkuppe, Germany. At that time it was registered as G-GAAA. The following year it went to South Africa as ZS-23.

== The name ==
Hjordis is a character in Norse mythology, the mother of Sigurd/Siegfried.

== Specifications ==
Data from Ellison 1971, p. 94

General characteristics

- Crew: 1
- Length: 6.58 m (21 ft 7 in)
- Wingspan: 15.54 m (51 ft 0 in)
- Wing area: 11.52 m^{2} (124.0 sq ft)
- Aspect ratio: 21
- Airfoil: Göttingen 652 at root, RAF 32 at tip
- Empty weight: 144 kg (317 lb)
- Gross weight: 218 kg (481 lb)

Performance

- Rate of sink: 0.61 m/s (120 ft/min) minimum
- Lift-to-drag: 24
- Wing loading: 18.9 kg/m^{2} (3.9 lb/sq ft)
