= Folding Legs =

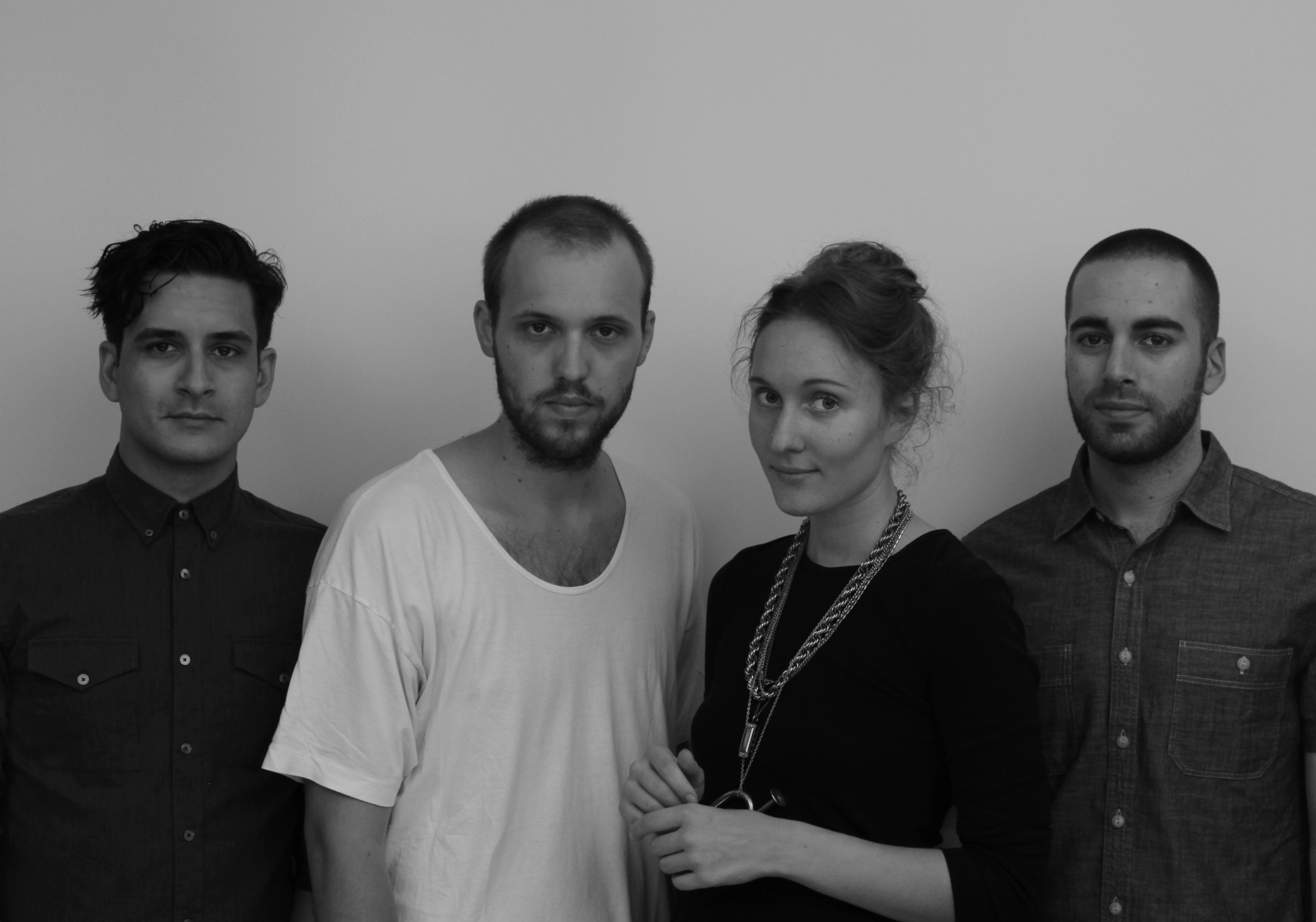
- Folding Legs in Brooklyn, 2013

Background information
- Origin: New York City, US; Stockholm, Sweden; Vienna, Austria
- Genres: Alternative dance, Post-disco, Alternative rock
- Years active: 2009-2015
- Members: Katharina Stenbeck; Gregory Henits; Christopher Cerny; Jesse Richman
- Past members: Lelo Lourenzo
- Website: www.folding-legs.com

Folding Legs is an alternative dance/post-disco band formed in 2009, based in New York. The three core members hail from Vienna, Stockholm and New York City. The band, fronted by a female lead singer, is known for their exuberant and stylized live shows, often incorporating art and performance elements.

Seen Heard Known describes their singer as "captivating", and says that they are "about far more than great music, but about creating a new way to engage with and experience sound."

== History ==
=== Early history ===
The band began as a side project between friends Greg Henits and Chris Cerny. At the time, Greg lived in New York and Chris was rooted in Vienna. The two collaborated on music by emailing material back and forth. Around this time, Katharina (having moved to New York from Stockholm in 2005) and Greg met at a Theatre History class in Manhattan. The two became friends and shortly thereafter Katharina joined in the musical collaboration, contributing melodies and vocals to the material that Chris and Greg had written. At this time, the band went under the name Otterclan. Chris ultimately moved to New York in 2009, in order for them all to further pursue their career in music together.

=== 2010-2012 ===
The band spent 2010 playing New York’s underground music scene. They performed at numerous Manhattan and Brooklyn venues, including Knitting Factory, Arlene's Grocery and The Studio at Webster Hall, as well as holding artist residencies at Pete's Candy Store. Outside of New York, the band played The Trocadero Theatre in Philadelphia, Pennsylvania, as well as some larger venues in Europe, such as Flex in Vienna, Austria.

In the summer of 2010, the music video for Clemens Allesch's electronic remix of their song Time of Your Life was featured on the music television channel GoTv in Austria, Switzerland, and Germany.

The band changed their name to Folding Legs in early 2011.

In September 2011, the band was chosen to record for Converse, in the Converse Rubber Tracks Studio in Brooklyn together with engineer Hector Castillo (engineer for artists such as David Bowie, Björk, and Lou Reed).

In late 2011, they went into the studio with Craig Roseberry (manager, marketing consultant and music curator for artists such as Yoko Ono and Vanessa Daou) as their producer and Ruddy Cullers (engineer for artists such as Basement Jaxx and Yeah Yeah Yeahs) as their engineer at Stratosphere Sound in Manhattan (owned by musicians Adam Schlesinger, Andy Chase, and James Iha, one of the founding members of The Smashing Pumpkins).

=== 2012-2014 ===
The band released their first EP, Drown in Light, on October 8, 2013 via KID Recordings. The music video for their song Double Time off the EP was featured on GoTv.

On August 12, 2014, the band's second EP, Glorious, was released (also via KID Recordings).

In the summer of 2014, the band began a departure from their previous alternative rock sound, and found a new direction in alternative dance, post-disco and indietronica. They premiered this new sound in concert at Rough Trade in Williamsburg.

The band played a final concert at Pianos in New York on December 9, 2014, before going on an indefinite hiatus.

== Band members ==
- Katharina Stenbeck – Lead Vocals
- Gregory Henits – Bass, Keys
- Christopher Cerny – Guitar
- Jesse Richman – Drums

Lead singer Katharina Stenbeck (from Stockholm, Sweden) has a background in experimental theatre and creates most of the art pieces for the band. Guitarist Chris Cerny (from Vienna, Austria) initially played various different instruments until he ultimately settled on the guitar. Bassist/keyboardist Greg Henits (from New York, US) grew up playing classical music and also has a background in theatre. Drummer Jesse Richman (from Florida, US) joined the band in the spring of 2012.
