= Anna Camner =

Swedish artist

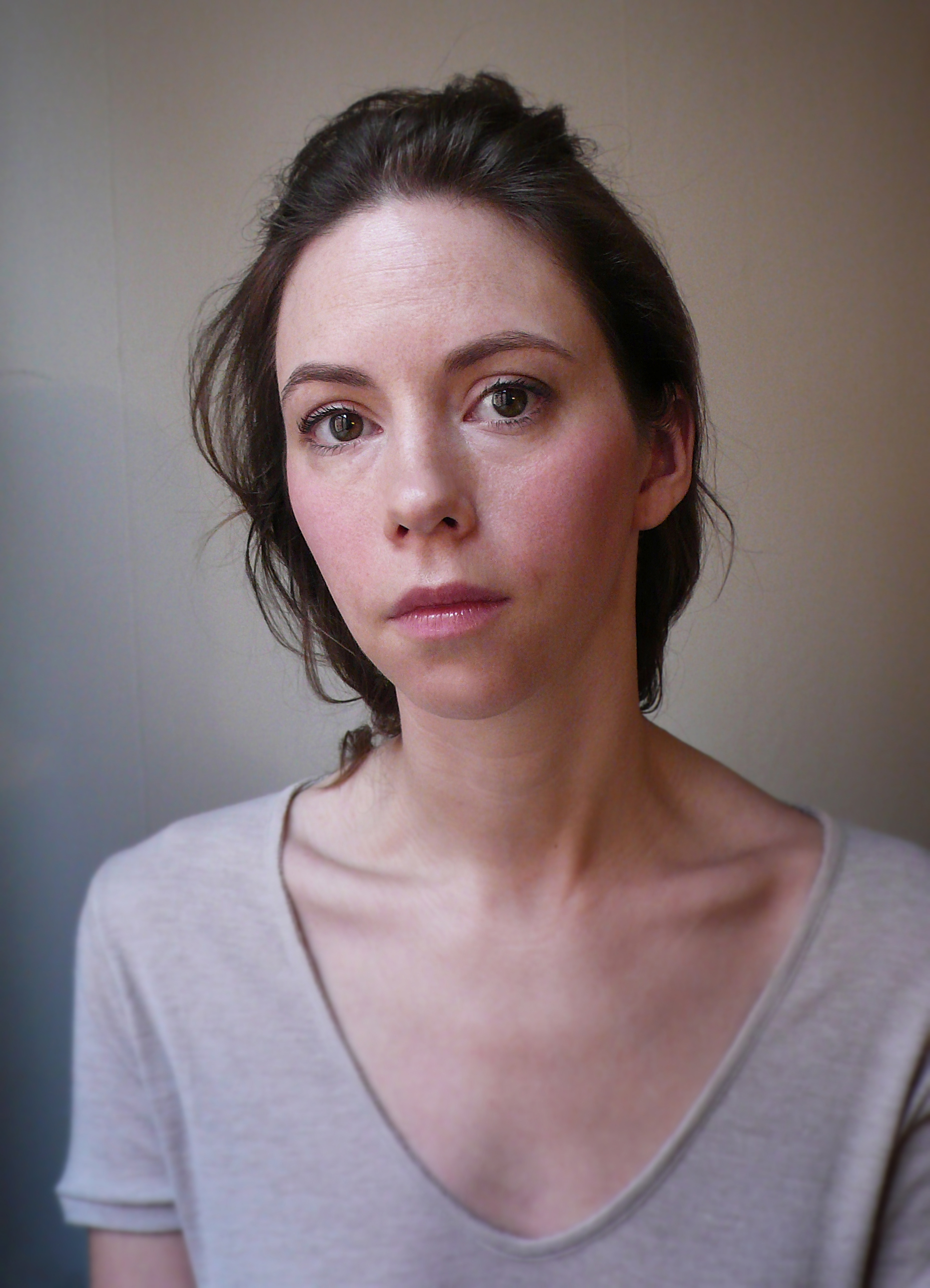
- Born: Anna Ingrid Camner; December 5, 1977 (age 48); Stockholm, Sweden
- Education: Kungl. Konsthögskolan in Stockholm
- Known for: Painting
- Awards: "Beckers Art Award 2017 - Färgfabriken – samtida konst och arkitektur".
- Website: annacamner.com

Anna Camner (born December 5, 1977), is a Swedish contemporary artist. Camner is a painter, known for her intense and meticulously executed paintings in oil on acrylic sheets. She holds a master's degree from The Kungl. Konsthögskolan in Stockholm. Camner has exhibited in Stockholm, New York (Stellan Holm Gallery) and London (Faggionato Gallery), and featured in The International Biennial of Contemporary Art (BIACI) in Cartagena, Colombia in 2014, Mumbai, India in 2019, and at the Armory Show, NY, USA, in 2020. In conjunction with being awarded the prestigious annual Beckers Art Award in 2017, her work was exhibited at Färgfabriken, Stockholm, Sweden.

Anna Camner's earlier work was focused on dark Vanitas themes; the paintings used to burst with foliage, flowers, insects, spider webs, snails and rodents, all in various stages of decay. The new body of work from 2015-2016 marks a clear departure from that. Conceptually, the artist still moves in the dark borderland between life and death, but her subjects, always painted against a solid pitch-black background, have been refined, given a stronger focus and a minimalist character, along with a sense of inherent mystery and uncertainty about whether the depicted subject is, in fact, alive or dead matter. The new body of work was exhibited in Stockholm and reviewed in several Swedish newspapers, such as Dagens Industri, Expressen, and Svenska Dagbladet.

In 2012, Wanås Konst Förlag published a picture book with the works of Anna Camner, titled The Sick Rose.

== Bibliography ==
The Sick Rose (2012) ISBN 9789197755863, Wanås konst

Wetterling Gallery: Anna Camner, Selected works 2014-2022 (2022) ISBN 9789187241475, Wetterling Gallery
