= Catrine Näsmark =

Swedish artist, painter and set designer

Catrine Näsmark (Stockholm, Sweden, 1970) is a Swedish artist, painter and set designer.

Näsmark was born in Stockholm, Uppland. She specializes in portraiture. Näsmark has exhibited at places such as Ulvsunda Castle, Katarina Church, and art galleries such as Couleur and Dansk Svenska Kompaniet in Sweden, and also makes portrait commissions. She makes annual portraits of the "Most Powerful Woman of the Year" award for Veckans Affärer. Examples of others who have had their portraits painted by Näsmark include King Carl XVI Gustav and Queen Silvia of Sweden; the artwork can be seen at the Royal Palace of Sweden. The unusual large paintings signify Näsmark's art.

Näsmark attended The Art School Basis, Stockholm and Nyckelviks School of Art, Lidingö. After studies in Sweden, she went to Denmark and The Royal Danish Academy of Fine Arts, where she obtained an MA in set design. Although scenography devoured her days Näsmark soon left scene design to devote herself to painting and portraiture. Näsmark has also taught Portrait Instruction, Storyboarding and Stage Design at The National Museum of Fine Arts and The University College of Arts, Craft, and Design (Konstfack) in Sweden.

Näsmark resides and works in Stockholm, Sweden with her family. She likes to take her Harley Davidson out for a ride as often as she can.
