= Karin Parrow =

Swedish painter (1900–1984)

- 4 March 1900
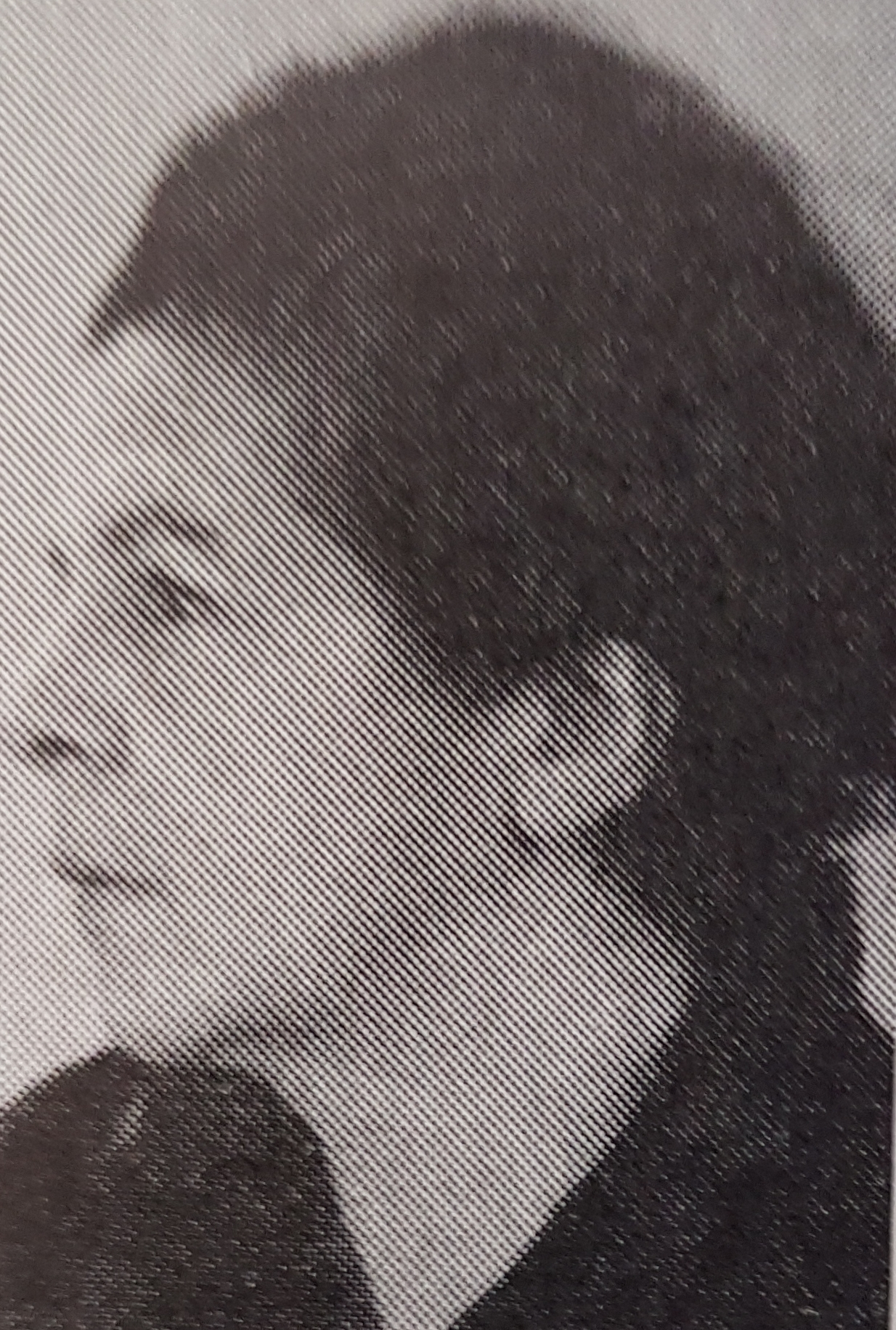
- Born: March 4, 1900; Vinga Island, Gothenburg
- Died: 1984
- Education: Valand Art School
- Movement: Expressionism

Karin Parrow née Taube (1900–1984) was an Expressionist painter from Sweden who belonged to a group known as the Gothenburg Colourists. After attending an art school in Paris, in 1926 she studied under Tor Bjurström at the Valand Art School in Gothenburg. A frequent exhibitor during her lifetime, her works are now in the collections of Nationalmuseet, Stockholm's Moderna Museet and the Gothenburg Museum of Art.

== Biography ==
Born on Vinga Island near Gothenburg on 4 March 1900, Karin Taube was the daughter of the lighthouse keeper Carl Gunnar Taube and his wife Julia Sofia née Jacobsdotter. One of the family's 13 children, she was raised in a harmonious cultural environment, several of her siblings gaining recognition for their involvement in art or writing.

After working first as a clerk and then as a maid in London, in 1924 she attended an art school in Paris. In 1926, she married the sea captain Torsten Parrow and began training under Tor Bjurström at the Valand Art School in Gothenburg until 1929. In the 1930s, she presented her work frequently at group exhibitions, receiving mixed reviews for her sharply coloured paintings. Her first solo exhibition was in 1941 at the Modern Konst Gallery in Stockholm. Four years later, she had a further solo presentation in Gothenburg at the God Konst Gallery. Works by Parrow are now in the collections of Nationalmuseet, Stockholm's Moderna Museet and the Gothenburg Museum of Art.

Karin Parrow died in Stockholm in 1984, aged 84.
