= Johanna Emerentia von Bilang =

Swedish artist (1777–1857)

Johanna Emerentia von Bilang (4 February 1777 – 9 May 1857) was a Swedish miniaturist.

Born in Stockholm to the army captain and etching artist Jacob Johan von Bilang and Emerentia Scheding, von Bilang had a very long career producing miniatures, often in ivory, by clients from the nobility and military. She died in Stockholm, aged 80.
