= Sylvia Stave =

Swedish silversmith and illustrator

Sylvia Rosa Agneta Stave, birth name Sylvia Gadd, (1908–1994) was a Swedish silversmith and illustrator who was active until 1940. After successfully exhibiting at the 1930 Stockholm Exhibition, she was appointed lead artist at Hallbergs Guldsmeds AB, a large jewellery firm employing over 600 with a factory in Stockholm. Over the following years, she received good reviews for the articles exhibited in Sweden and abroad and her designs for everyday items were adopted by Hallbergs for mass production. After attending the École des Beaux-Arts in Paris (1937–1939), she contributed works to Hallbergs for the last time. In 1940, she married the French physician René Agid and moved to Paris, after which she ceased designing. Many of her works are included in the permanent collection of Stochholm's National Museum.

== Early life ==
Born in Växjö on 25 May 1908, Sylvia Gadd was the daughter of Jean Christer Gadd and Agnes Constance Elisabet Stave who had not married. After first living with foster parents, she moved to Falkenberg to live with her mother and half-sister. After subsequently living with her father and stepmother, when she was 21 she moved to Stockholm, adopting her mother's remarried name. There she appears to have attended the Collage of Arts, Crafts and Design without completing her course as in 1929 she was taken on by Hallbergs where she perhaps continued her training.

== Career ==
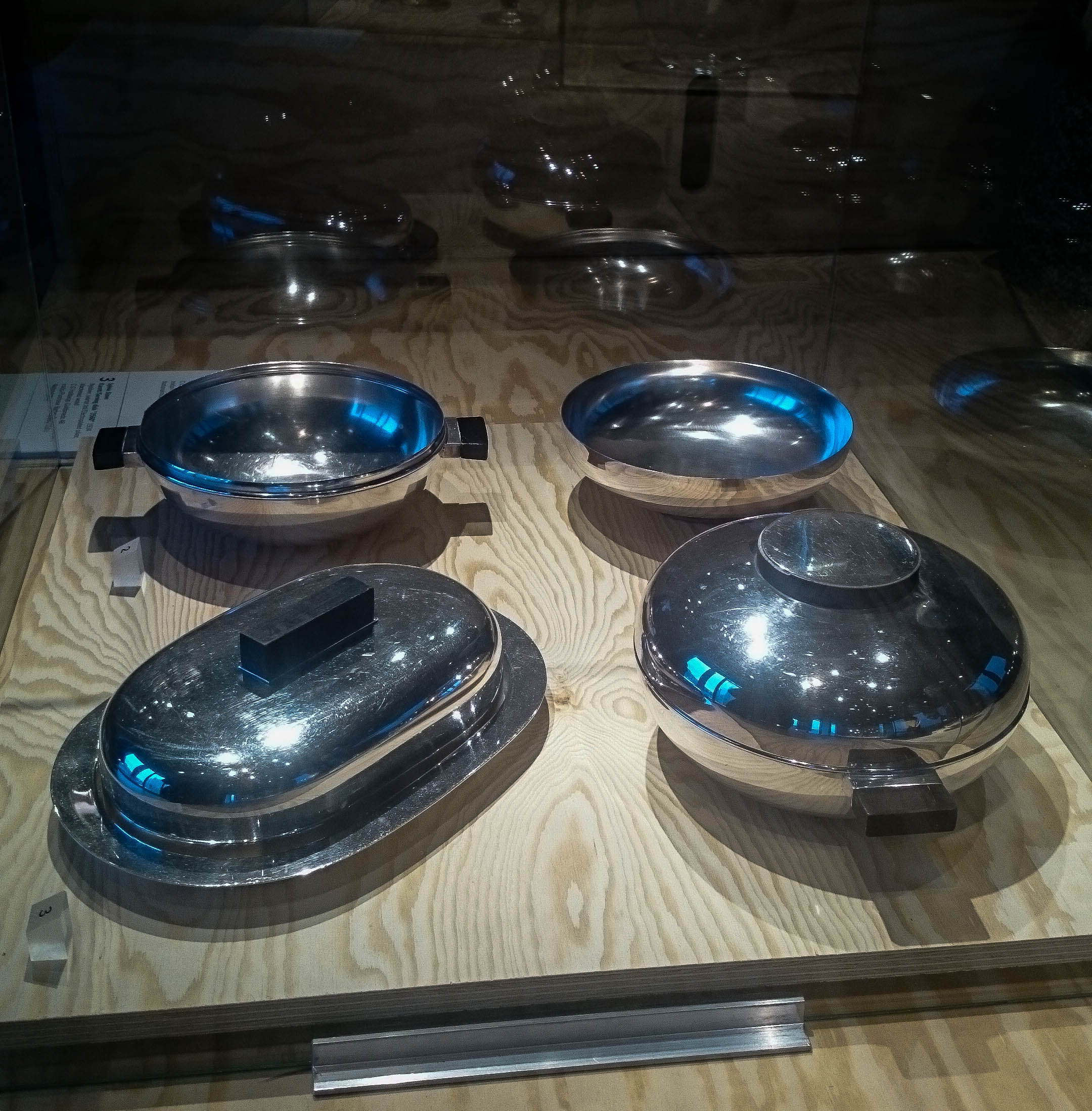
Sylvia Stave designs in the Nationalmuseum

In 1930, she contributed a pewter and ebony chessboard and an enamelled silver cask to the Stockholm Exhibition. After the National Museum acquired the cask, her future was no longer in doubt. Although she was still only 23 years old, Hallbergs, with a staff of some 600, promoted her to artistic director.

During the 1930s, she submitted her designs to numerous exhibitions, receiving a series of favourable press reports from the critics. One of the most important was in Stockholm's NK department store, where she presented her creations alongside those of the established designers Folke Arström and Rolf Engströmer. She also exhibited abroad, in Chicago (1933), New York, London and Leipzig (1934), and Paris (1937). In contrast to the mass-produced items from Hallbergs, her designs centred on far more exclusive, avant-garde creations in silver and pewter, often in electroplated silver which was in fashion at the time. Her creations included an orb-shaped coffee set with wooden handles and a cocktail shaker which was marketed by the Italian company Alessi in 1989. She also designed items for mass production, including plates, bowls, casks, jugs and kitchenware. She is remembered in particular for a huge commemorative silver plaque for the Norwegian shipping firm Wilh. Wilhelmsen for their 75th anniversary in 1936.

In 1937, Stave represented Hallbergs at the World Exposition in Paris, receiving praise for her pieces from the critics. She was admitted to the École des Beaux Arts where she studied for the next two years. In 1939, on returning to Sweden, she contributed designs to Hallbergs for that year's collection. It was to be her last contribution as in 1940 she married the French physician René Agid and settled with him in Paris. She discontinued her designing activities, living the rest of her life as a housewife.

Sylvia Stave and René Agid had two sons: Yves and Olivier. Yves Agid, an internationally recognized neurologist and co-founder of the Brain and Spine Institute (ICM) in Paris, married France Basdevant, with whom he had two children, Isabelle and David. He later remarried and had a daughter, Elsa. Olivier Agid is a painter, married Brigitte Patte, and the father of Félix and Roméo.

Sylvia Stave died in Paris on 28 October 1994. Many of her works are included in the permanent collection of Stochholm's National Museum.
