= Kristina Schmid =

Swedish photographer

- Born: 1972 (age 53–54); Sweden
- Education: Medborgarskolan' art school, Stockholm; Pernbys målarskola, Stockholm; Valand School of Fine Arts, Göteborg; Academy of Fine Arts, Munich
- Known for: photographer; especially sculptures

Kristina Schmid (born 1972) is a Swedish photographer from Stockholm.

Schmid visited the Medborgarskolan art school in Stockholm from 1993 to 1994, and afterwards the Pernbys målarskola until 1996, also in Stockholm. From 1996 to 2001, she studied at the Valand School of Fine Arts in Gothenburg, and participated courses at Munich's Academy of Fine Arts in Germany.

== Exhibitions ==
- 1997:
  - "Unga Tecknare", Nationalmuseum, Stockholm (group exhibition)
  - "Tecknade Pärlor", Galleri Rotor, Gothenburg (group exhibition)
- 1998: "Galerie Bar", Academy of Fine Arts, Munich (group exhibition)
- 1999: "Begär", Fyrstads' project, Dårstugan, Vänersborg (group exhibition)
- 2001: graduates' exhibition, Valand School of Fine Arts, Gothenburg (group exhibition)
- 2003:
  - Studio 44, Stockholm (solo exhibition)
  - Liljevalchs vårsalong, Stockholm (group exhibition)
- 2004: Liljevalchs vårsalong, Stockholm (group exhibition)
- 2005: "and being confused is an exercise", Galleri 54 (Grupp 54), Gothenburg (solo exhibition)
- 2006: art forum, Norrköping (solo exhibition; co: Jenny Granlund)
- 2008: Liljevalchs vårsalong, Stockholm (group exhibition)
- 2010: Galleri 1, Gothenburg (solo exhibition).
