= Magdalena Margareta Stenbock =

Swedish artist (1744–1822)

- Born: June 19, 1744
- Died: July 18, 1822 (aged 78)
- Spouse: Erik Julius Cederhielm

Magdalena Margareta Stenbock (19 June 1744 – 18 July 1822), was a Swedish artist. She was an honorary member of the Royal Swedish Academy of Arts (1795).

She was the issue of count Gustaf Leonhard Stenbock and Fredrika Eleonora Horn af Ekebyholm, and married in 1761 to general major baron Erik Julius Cederhielm. She served as lady-in-waiting to the queen of Sweden, Sophia Magdalena of Denmark. Hedwig Elizabeth Charlotte of Holstein-Gottorp describe her in her famous journal as energetic and firm.
