= Iku-Turso =

Iku-Turso could refer to:

- Iku-Turso (creature), a Finnish mythological creature
- Iku-Turso (submarine), a Finnish submarine used during the Second World War
- 2828 Iku-Turso, an asteroid
