= Marja Casparsson =

Swedish painter

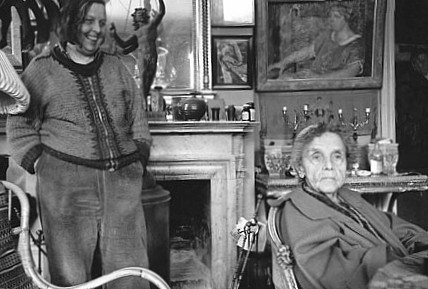
Portrait of Marja Casparsson and her mother

Marja Casparsson (July 11, 1901 – August 24, 1993) was a Swedish painter.

Born in Saltsjöbaden, Casparsson was the daughter of embroidery artist Anna Casparsson. Beginning in the 1920s she spent much time at Gnarp. She died at Saltsjöbaden.

Casparsson painted a portrait of her mother in the year of her death, 1961; this is today in the portrait collection at Gripsholm Castle; the Nationalmuseet also owns her portraits of Arne Cassel, Mary-Ann Tollin, and Leeo Verde. Three of her works, including two portraits, are in the collection of the Moderna Museet. During her career she was especially known for her depictions of the elderly.
