= Eva Bagge =

Swedish painter (1871–1964)

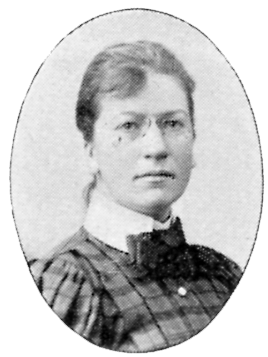
- Born: 15 December 1871; Stockholm, Sweden
- Died: 6 November 1964 (aged 92); Stockholm, Sweden
- Resting place: Norra begravningsplatsen
- Education: Royal Swedish Academy of Fine Arts; Konstnärsförbundets skola; Académie Colarossi
- Occupation: Painter

Eva Bagge (15 December 1871 – 6 November 1964) was a Swedish painter who studied first in Sweden and then made study trips to Rome and Paris. Remembered in particular for her farm scenes and interiors, she did not reach her peak until 1941 when works based on her approach to late 19th-century Realism attracted attention at her solo exhibition in a Stockholm gallery. Such was the interest that they were soon exhibited in Munich and Berlin. Several Swedish art museums, including Stockholm's Nationalmuseum, have works by Bagge in their collections.

== Biography ==
Born on 15 December 1871 in Stockholm, Eva Bagge was the daughter of the printing press director Per Olof Bagge (1833–1872) and his wife Henrika Ottiliana née von Fieandt. She was the youngest of the family's three children and the cousin of artist Elisabeth Bagge. After her father died when she was still a baby, she was brought up by her mother in Stockholm. From 1892 to 1895, she studied at the Royal Swedish Academy of Fine Arts under Georg von Rosen and Gustaf Cederström. Not happy with the emphasis on historical painting at the Academy, after spending a short period at Konstnärsförbundets skola ('the Artists' Association School') from 1894 to 1895, she took a study trip to Rome in 1896 and the following year moved to Paris where she attended the Académie Colarossi and spent the summer in Brittany. She then returned to Stockholm to complete her studies at the Artists' Association School. In 1903, she joined Nya Idun, a women's association.

Bagge continued to make trips abroad, painting farms, interiors and portraits. Her works included New Year's Eve and From Brittany (1897), Evening at Drottingholm (1911), and Morning in the Atelier (1943). She reached her peak in 1941 aged 70 when works based on her approach to late 19th-century Realism attracted attention at her solo exhibition in a Stockholm gallery. Such was the interest that they were soon exhibited in Munich and Berlin.

Bagge's painting can be described as strongly influenced by the times, largely determined by the basic education she received in the doctrines of 1880s Realism. At the same time, a capacity for renewal is very much in evidence, where the old form is filled with depth and meditation. She placed the study of life and nature above all else. In addition to the influence of the French 1880s, features of the 17th-century Dutch, Chardin and the early French and Danish 19th centuries can also be discerned. However, her art also pointed forward with pictorial simplification and concentration in unified form, not least in the atmospheric interiors. Bagge also painted portraits and landscapes.

Eva Bagge died in Stockholm on 6 November 1964; she is buried in Norra begravningsplatsen. Several Swedish art museums, including Stockholm's Nationalmuseum, have works by Bagge in their collections.
