= Ann Mari Sjögren =

Ann Mari Sjögren (1 January 1918 – 11 July 2010) was a Swedish fantasy artist and illustrator.

Sjögren was raised in Nyhamnsläge, a small Swedish fishing community. The younger of two sisters. Her artistic heritage can be traced to her mother who was very conscious of colours, and her father who, in later years spent his time carving figures in wood. She was educated as a commercial artist at Reklamkonstskolan in Stockholm, and later worked at Kärnan publishers in Helsingborg, at a time when they started to publish children's books. She has been painting fairies for as long as she can remember. Every piece of paper that she found became a little work of art.

Her first book, En dag i Älvriket was published just after World War II in 1945. Three years later it was translated into English as “A Day in Fairy Land”. It was published in ten different languages. It remains a highly collectible antique publication that influenced many post war baby boom children. An editorial from an American paper of that time shows the famous actress and film star Joan Crawford, reading from A Day in Fairy Land for her four adopted children. She went on to teach adults in painting, croquis or batik. Her many books like Lill, foundling of the animals and The Princess and the Pirate Wedding Bells in Fairyland were sold worldwide.

In her 88th year, she enjoyed a comeback as fairy nostalgia swept the world as a new art movement, her work being published with modern fantasy masters Brian Froud in The Art of Faery and Alan Lee in The World of Faery and in 500 Fairy Motifs by Myrea Pettit.

== Works published in following books ==
- The Art of Faery (2003), written by David Riché,
- The World of Faery (2005), written by David Riché,
- 500 Fairy Motifs (2005), written by Myrea Pettit,
