= Anna Friberger =

Swedish illustrator and set designer

Anna Friberger (born 1944) is a Swedish illustrator, children's book author, animator and set designer.

== Personal Life and Studies ==
Though she was born and grew up in Gothenburg, she currently lives in Malmö.

Friberger started a degree in decorative painting at Konstfack in Stockholm and a degree in illustration at Beckmans before taking on a course for set design offered by SVT. After working for SVT, Friberger travelled to The Hague to study animation at the Vrije Academie voor Beeldende Kunsten.

== Work ==
Anna Friberger's work includes set design for Swedish television, animated movies for children's TV programs, record covers, illustrations for newspapers and posters.

=== Children's Books ===
Anna has illustrated 76 books, produced school books, and written and illustrated two of her own children's books. She cites Elsa Beskow, Ivar Arosenius, Oscar Wiklund, Louis Moe, and Jean de Brunhoff as influences on her work with picture books.

=== Comics ===
She wrote and illustrated for Bamse, the popular Swedish comic book series.

=== Set Design ===
Anna Friberger started working for SVT after completing their course on set design She has worked with Marsyateatern in Stockholm.

=== Animation ===
Friberger has animated various children's television programs and has animated two films.

=== Online publications ===
Friberger has a website on which she has published some of her illustrations.

== Bibliography ==
=== Scenography ===
- Pleijel, Sonja and Söderberg, Marianne, dir. Postmästarfrun från Hörby. 1988. TV-film in Swedish. produced by Svergies Television AB TV2. Scenography by Anna Friberger.
- Márton, Elisbeth dir. I spegeln. 1985. Experimental Film. produced by Drakfilm Produktion AB and Stifelsen Svenska Filminstitutet. Scenography by Anna Friberg.
- Bergqvist, Rikard and Hallgren, Ronnie dir. The Outcast of the Welfare State 1987. Scenography by Anna Friberger.

=== Illustrated Books ===
- Fribeger, Anna (Illustrator) and Harris, Martin (editor). Bockarna Bruse. Bonnier Carlsen, 2002.
- Fribeger, Anna (Illustrator) and Harris, Martin (editor). De tre små grisarna : engelsk folksaga. Bonnier Carlsen, 2003.
- Andersen, H.C. Fribeger, Anna (Illustrator) and Harris, Martin (editor). Prinsessan på ärten. Bonnier Carlsen, 2007.
