= Maja Synnergren =

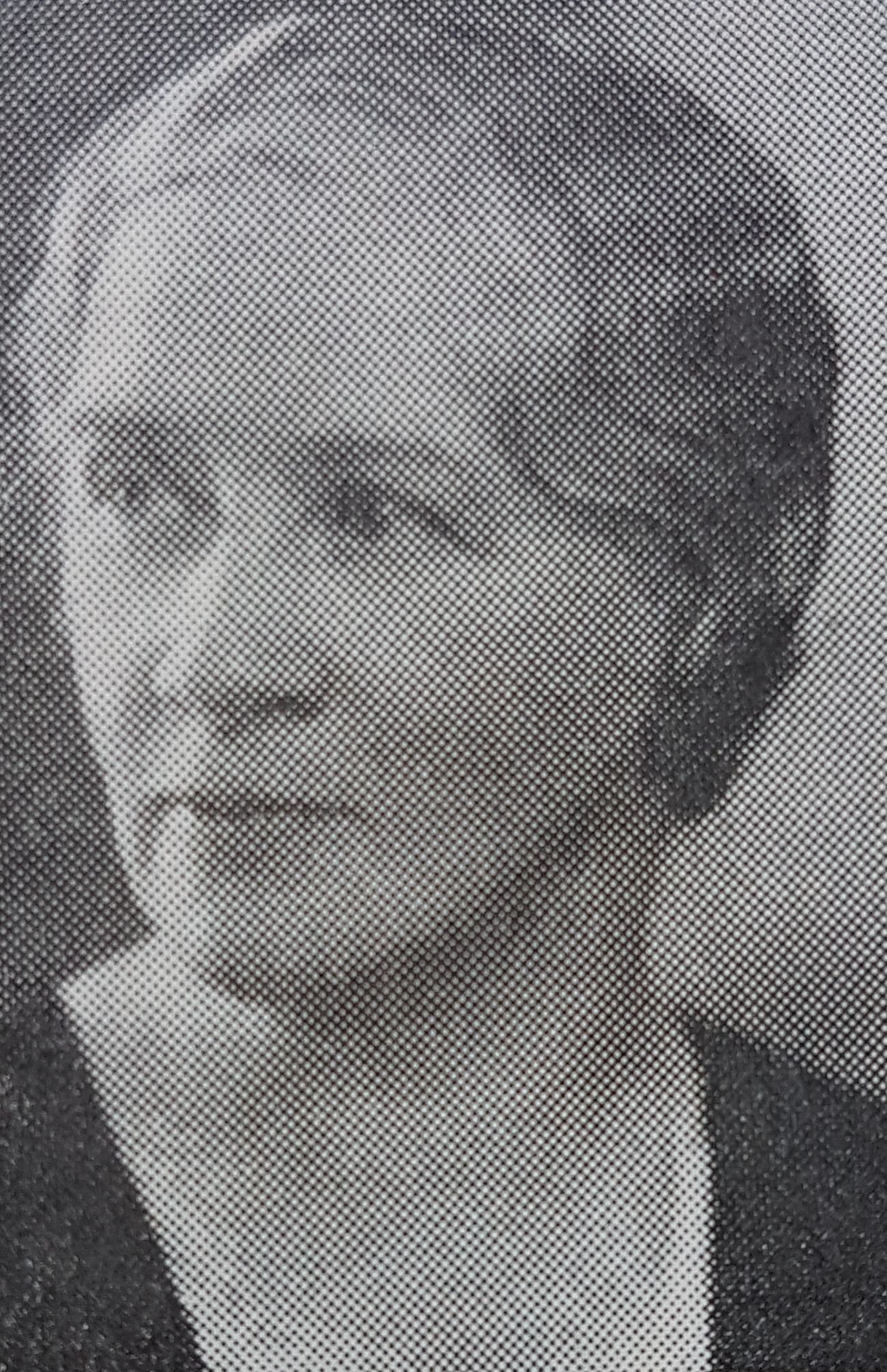
- Born: Ester Maria Synnergren; 30 September 1891; Sundsvall, Sweden
- Died: 8 February 1950 (aged 58); Stockholm, Sweden
- Known for: Illustration and design

Ester Maria "Maja" Synnergren (née Ekholm; 30 September 1891 – 8 February 1950) was a Swedish painter, drawing teacher, and draftsman. She illustrated several fairy-tale books.

== Life and work ==
Synnergren was born on 30 September 1899 in Sundsvall, Västernorrland County, Sweden. She was the daughter of businessman Rudolf Ekholm and Augusta Jernberg. She studied at Konstfack in Stockholm from 1910 to 1913 and worked as a drawing teacher at Hjo Samskola. Synnergren married manager Bertil Synnergren in 1917 and moved to Stockholm.

She made a name for herself as a fairy tale illustrator and children's portraitist. In 1928, she published the picture book Herrskapstroll, which in its layout is connected to Elsa Beskow's children's books. The many fairy-tale books she illustrated include Brita Ellström's Lasse tänker flyga jämte andra små sagor, Eugenie Beskow's Sjuttisjuornas förbund, Maja Jäderin-Hagfors En bok om en pojke, en hund och en aktersnurra, and Folkskolans barntidnings jubileumssagor. She also drew Christmas cards and collaborated in Christmas publications and other magazines as an illustrator.

== Death ==
Synnergren died in Stockholm on 8 February 1950 at the age of 58. She is buried in Skogskyrkogården.
