= Kerstin Abram-Nilsson =

Swedish painter and illustrator (1931–1998)

Kerstin Abram-Axelsson née Nilsson; (7 July 1931 — 18 December 1998) was a Swedish artist, debater, and social activist, who primarily expressed herself through various paintings and graphic arts. Her work has been shown in exhibitions throughout Europe, the United States, Mexico, and the Soviet Union.

== Life ==
Nilsson was born on 7 July 1931 in Engelbrekt Parish, Stockholm. She was the daughter of Abram Nilsson, who was a physician, and his wife, Margareta Dahlström, who was a nurse. Nilsson and her elder brother were brought up in a middle-class home, where the norm was making music and engaging in the arts. In 1951, after finishing high school, Nilsson attended Konstfackskolan (now Konstfack, University of arts, crafts, and design) in Stockholm. She subsequently got enrolled in the Royal Swedish Academy of Fine Arts. She was instructed in graphic art by Harald Sallberg, and Jurgen von Konow. She then started traveling to different places and experiencing other cultures with several of her friends, one of whom was Alf Olsson, who would later become her husband. During the summer of 1955 and 1957, they traveled through the former Yugoslavia, Turkey and Greece. She was inspired by her trips abroad and started black and white lithographs, the first of which was titled Människor på väg. After her student's years in college, she went to travel Central America with her husband.

During the 1960s, both her interest and involvement in exploring other environments and cultures increased. After her second marriage with architect Valdemar Axelsson in 1962, who was working for the UN, she accompanied him to the newly formed states of Trinidad and Somalia. While being in Somalia, she partook in several debates. She also made illustrations and graphic reports. She provided illustrations for the school textbooks in Somalia. From 1966, she started creating children's illustrated books, and illustrating in other author's books including Ingrid Sjöstrand's Kalle Vrånglebäck, Bo Lundberg's Synvändor – om naturen, människan och helheten and Marie Nordström's Gener och sånt. In 1968 she designed postage stamps to commemorate the 100th anniversary of the first folk high schools in Sweden. She also started exhibiting her works in various art expositions. From 1968, she became an 'image activist.'

From 1971 to 1989, she was a teacher at Konstfack. Her work has been shown in exhibitions in Europe, the United States, Mexico, and the Soviet Union. She has made decorations for Huddinge Hospital and Stockholm University Library at Frescati and is represented at Kalmar Art Museum Kalmar Konstmuseum and the Moderna Museet.

Nilsson was a member of the Swedish women's association Nya Idun.

== Death ==
Kerstin Abram-Nilsson died on 18 December 1998 in Djursholm, Danderyds parish, Stockholm.

== Honors ==
- Grafiska sällskapets stipendium
- Knut V. Pettersson-stipendiet
- Ann-Margret Dahlquist-Ljungbergs stipendium

== Bibliography ==
- Grosjean, Alexia (2018). Svenskt kvinnobiografiskt lexikon [Biographical Dictionary of Swedish Women.] University of Gothenburg. ISBN 978-91-639-7594-3.
- Öhrström, Kerstin (1988). Vem är hon: kvinnor i sverige : biografisk uppslagsbok (in Swedish). Norstedts. ISBN 978-91-1-863422-2.
- Abram-Nilsson, Kerstin, 'Handla därefter', Ararat: komplement till utställningen på Moderna museet i Stockholm 1976. 7: Varför Ararat, Stockholm, S- 7-9, 1976.
- Abram-Nilsson, Kerstin, et al., Sveket mot framtiden?: svenskt energipolitiskt beslut våren 1975 : en tidning om människor och kärnkraft, [S.l.], 1974.
- Abram-Nilsson, Kerstin, 'en liten möjlighet att inte ge upp innan man är söndermald', Paletten, 1969:1
- Eriksson, Yvonne & Göthlund, Anette, 'Från det perifera till det vitala: kvinnliga konstnärskap i perspektiv', Från modernism till samtidskonst, 2003
