= Anna Casparsson =

Swedish textile artist

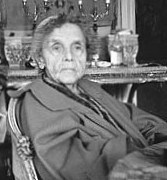
Portrait of Anna Casparsson

Anna Charlotta Sophia Casparsson (born Anna von Feilitzen) (10 October 1861 – 24 September 1961) was a Swedish textile artist, known for her embroidery.

Born in Linköping, Casparsson was the daughter of Urban von Feilitzin. Trained as a pianist, she later, after her marriage to Edvard Casparsson, began producing embroidery, developing an unconventional technique incorporating beads, lace, and sequins. Her work was inspired by music, Bible stories, and folk stories, and by the work of Carl Jonas Love Almqvist and Ernst Josephson. She first showed work in 1945, and in 1960 was the subject of an exhibition at the Moderna Museet. She died in Saltsjöbaden.

Casparsson's daughter Marja was a painter; her portrait of her mother, painted in the year of the latter's death, is in the portrait collection at Gripsholm Castle. Three of Anna's embroideries are in the collection of the Nationalmuseet, while two more are owned by the Moderna Museet.
