= Karin Hansson =

Swedish artist and researcher

Karin Margareta Kjellsdotter Hansson (born 1967) is a Swedish artist and researcher.

== Biography ==
Hansson was born in Gothenburg.

She graduated in 1994 from the Royal Institute of Art in Stockholm. 2015 she defender her thesis Accommodating Differences Power, Belonging, and Representation Online at the Department of Computer and Systems Sciences, Stockholm University.

Hansson is one of the Swedish pioneers in political art and new media. In her work as an artist and art curator she has given the development of the information society a critical artistic comment, with art projects such as Best Before, Money, Public Opinion, Performing the Common, and Work a Work. Karin Hansson founded the artists' group Association for Temporary Art [a: t] (1996) together with Åsa Andersson Broms, Nils Claesson, Astrid Trotzig, and Josefin Ericsson. She was also active in CRAC (Creative Room for Art and Computing), a media lab for artist that opened in Stockholm 1998.

She is Professor of Media Technology at The School of Natural Sciences, Technology and Environmental Studies at Södertörn University. In her research practice she combines critical perspectives with applied design research, contributing to research in areas such as net activism, crowdsourcing, digital heritage, participatory research methods, and artistic research.
