= Ingeborg Lindborg =

Swedish artist (1875–1950)

- Born: 10 August 1875; Hjörlunde, Denmark
- Died: 2 March 1950 (aged 74); Stockholm, Sweden
- Other names: Elna Ingeborg Andreasen-Lindborg
- Known for: Painting, printmaking

Ingeborg Lindborg or Ingeborg Andréasen-Lindborg (1875–1950) was a Swedish artist.

== Biography ==
Lindborg was born on 10 August 1875 in Hjörlunde, Frederiksborg, Denmark. She was the daughter of farmer Hans Andreasén and Johanna Dorothea Sörensen-Dildal. In 1907 she married the artist and curator Axel Edvin Lindborg (1876–1951).

Andreasén-Lindborg studied art at the Art Institute of Chicago from 1896 to 1897 and at the Royal Danish Academy of Fine Arts in Copenhagen from 1900 to 1907, where she was the first woman to be awarded a gold medal in 1906. She moved to Stockholm in 1908 and studied under Axel Tallberg at the Royal Swedish Academy of Fine Arts' etching school in 1909. Together with her husband, she exhibited at the Salong Joel in Stockholm and she participated in the exhibitions of Grafiska sällskapet, the spring exhibitions at Charlottenborg Palace in Copenhagen and the Chicago Society of Etchers' exhibitions in Chicago. Her art consists of portraits, animals, still lifes and landscapes in oil, watercolor, pencil and etchings. In 1918 she began to paint miniatures on ivory, depicting, among other things, Princess Astrid. She was a member of the women's association Nya Idun.

She died on 2 March 1950 in Stockholm.

Her work is in the collection of the British Museum, the National Museum in Stockholm, the National Gallery of Denmark the Royal Library, Denmark, and the Smithsonian American Art Museum.

== Gallery ==
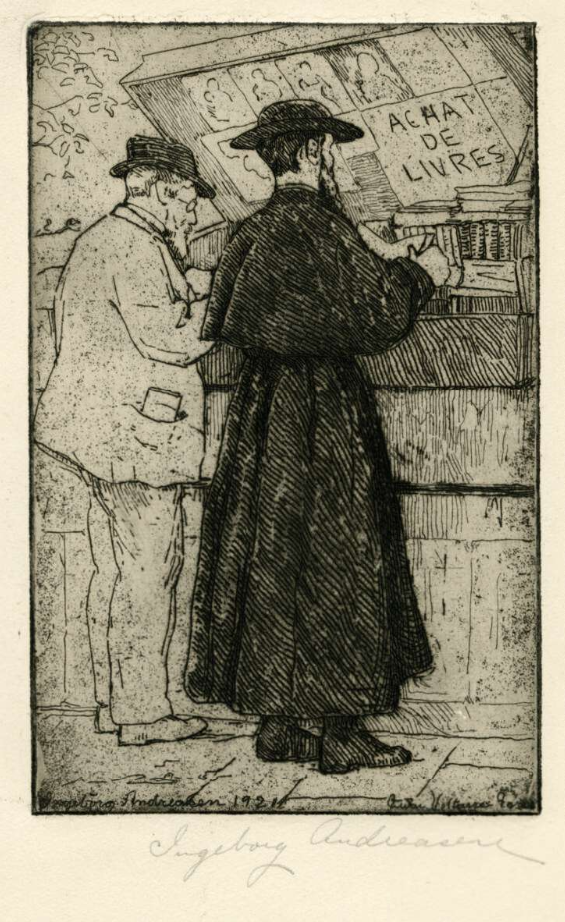
Quai Voltaine, Paris, 1921

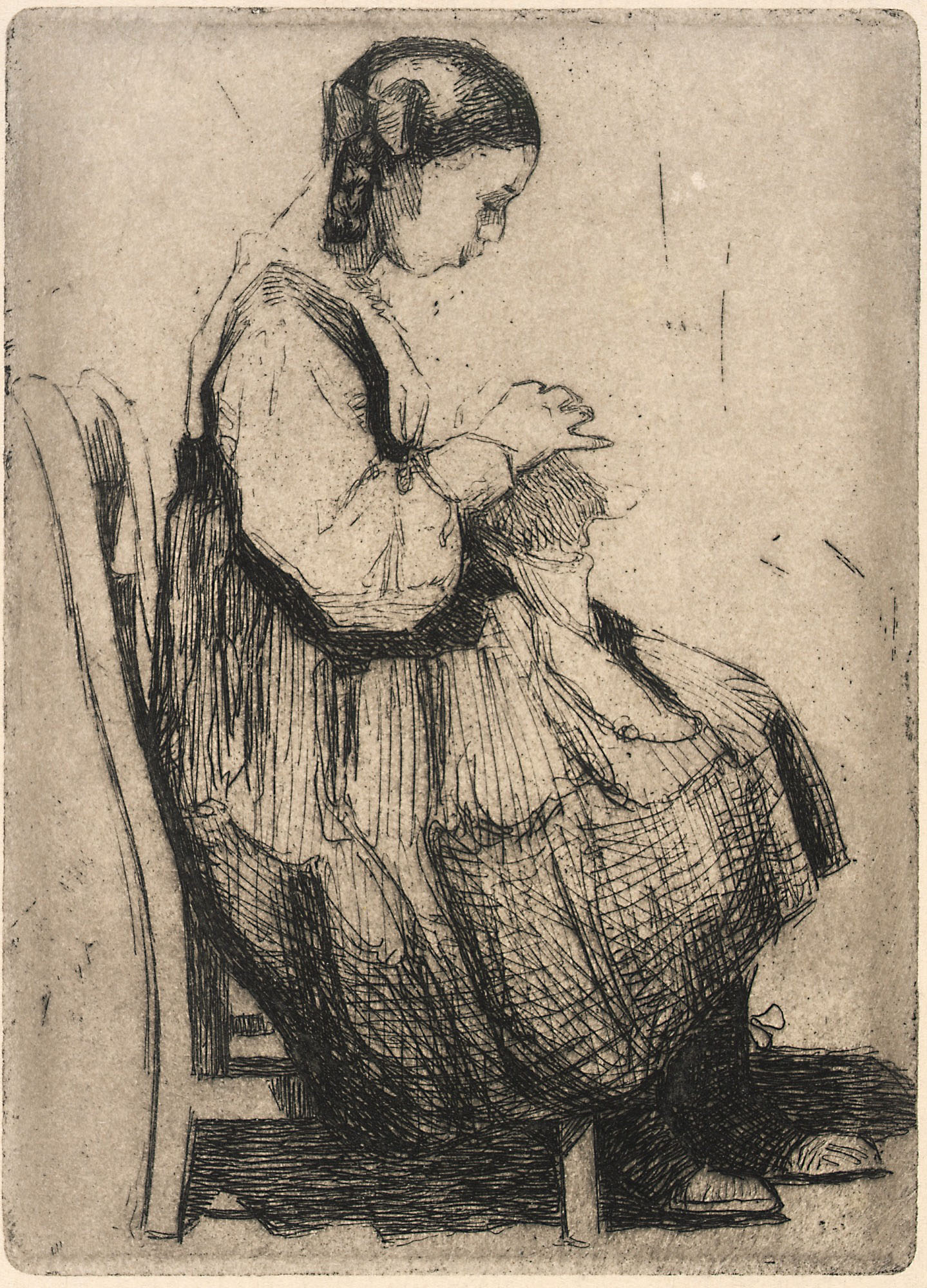
Little Girl Sewing

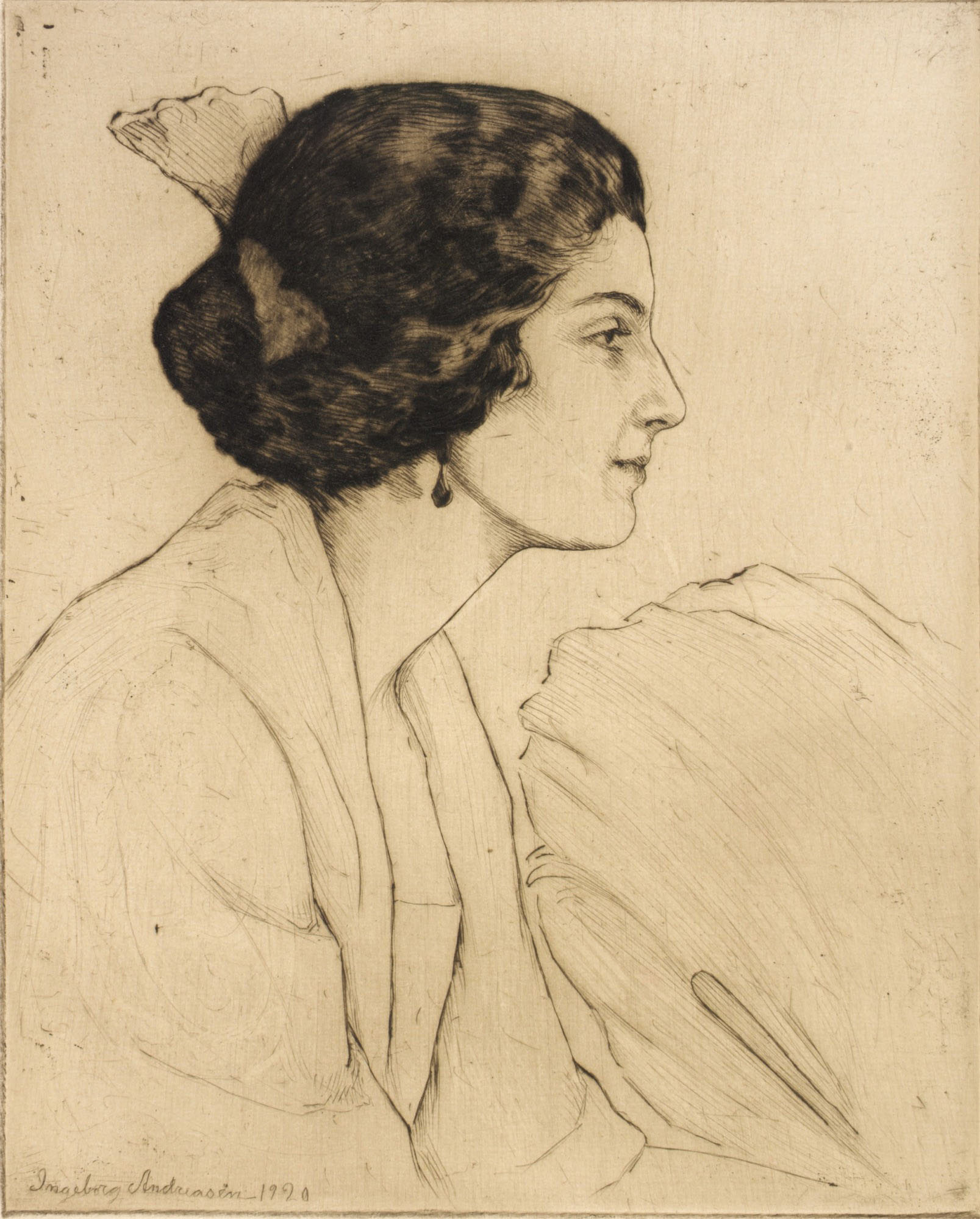
Lola, 1920
