= Maria Tesch =

Swedish photographer (1850–1936)

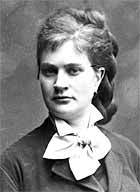
- Maria Tesch, circa 1890
- Born: Hedvig Maria Tesch; 1850
- Died: 1936 (aged 85–86)
- Occupation: Professional photographer
- Known for: Portraits

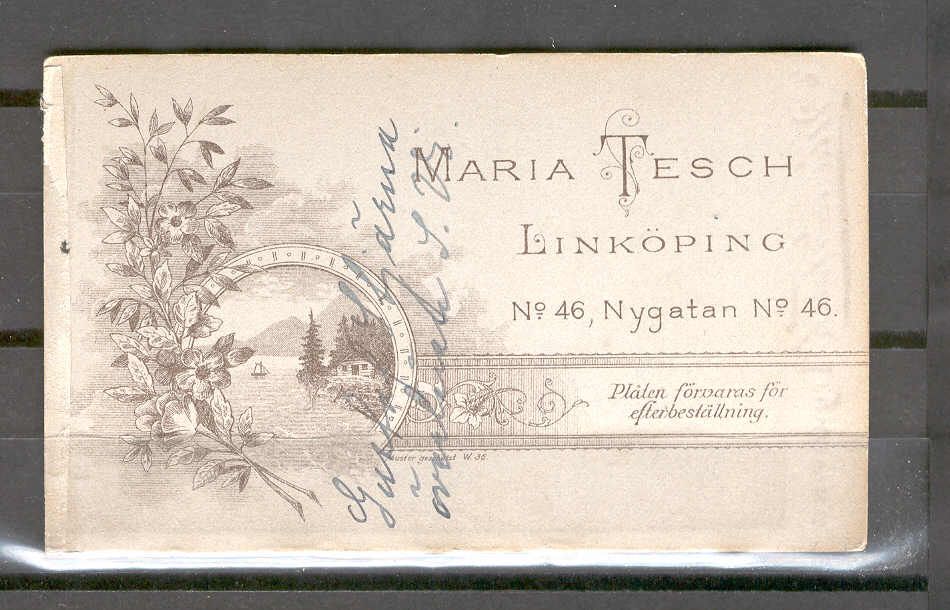
The back of a photo by Tesch

Hedvig Maria Tesch (23 June 1850 – 5 April 1936) was a Swedish professional photographer who had a studio in Linköping. She specialised in portrait photography, and was successful enough to open a second branch in Eksjö. As a result of her productive and highly successful business, thousands of her photographs remain in the collections of the local museum and county library.

== Biography ==
Born in Eksjö on 23 June 1850, Tesch became a photographer and business owner at a young age. It is not clear how she learned her skills. She had spent a month in Stockholm, where she may possibly have trained with established photographer Gösta Florman, and another in Berlin. Tesch moved to Linköping in 1873 where she opened a studio in a building on the corner of Drottninggatan and Nygatan. It was so successful that a few years later, she bought the property. As a result of her increasingly well-known reputation, people from the city and its surroundings visited her for portraits which can still be found in many family albums. Thanks to her enormous capacity for work, Tesch was able to enlarge her premises, engage several employees and open a branch in Eksjö. One of her tricks in making good photographs was to get people to smile by shouting "Look happy, think of the one who's going to get the photograph," before she disappeared behind the black curtain. She ran the Linköping studio until 1917, when she ceded it to Anna Göransson.

By the time she died on 5 April 1936, Tesch had built up a considerable fortune. She left it to the Linköping Association for the Aged (Föreningen De gamlas hem i Linköping) and to charities in Eksjö. Today thousands of her photographs are preserved in the local library and the Östergötland County Museum, where some of her equipment can also be seen.
