= Nyhamnsläge =

Urban village in Höganäs Municipality, Sweden

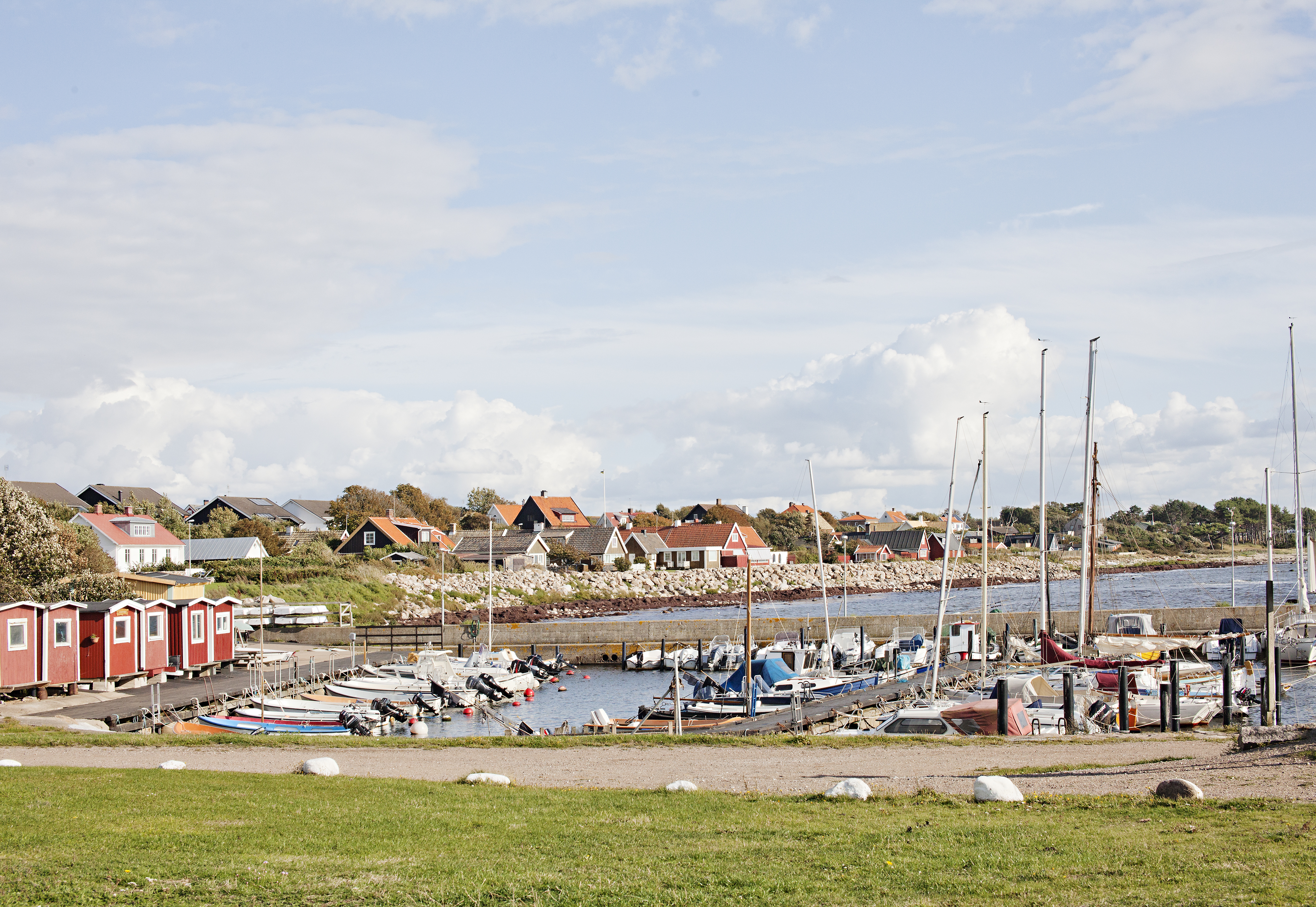

- Location within Skåne Location within Sweden
- Coordinates: 56°14′N 12°32′E
- Country: Sweden
- Province: Skåne
- County: Skåne County
- Municipality: Höganäs Municipality

Population (September 2011)
  - Total: 1,500
- Time zone: UTC+1 (CET)
  - Summer (DST): UTC+2 (CEST)

56.242222°N 12.539167°E

Nyhamnsläge is a part of Höganäs Municipality in Skåne County, Sweden with 1500 inhabitants (September 2011). In terms of borders, it is south to Strandbaden, north to Mölle, east to Arild and Skäret. On the west side is the Øresund, Baltic Sea. Nyhamnsläge's original name was Nyhamn. It changed its name to Nyhamnsläge in 1910 because there was another village in the country that shared the same name, since two villages are not allowed to have the same name. In Nyhamnsläge a harbour, a grocery store, two kindergartens, an elementary school and a retirement home are all within the village.
