= Ida Trotzig =

Swedish Japanologist, photographer (1864–1943)

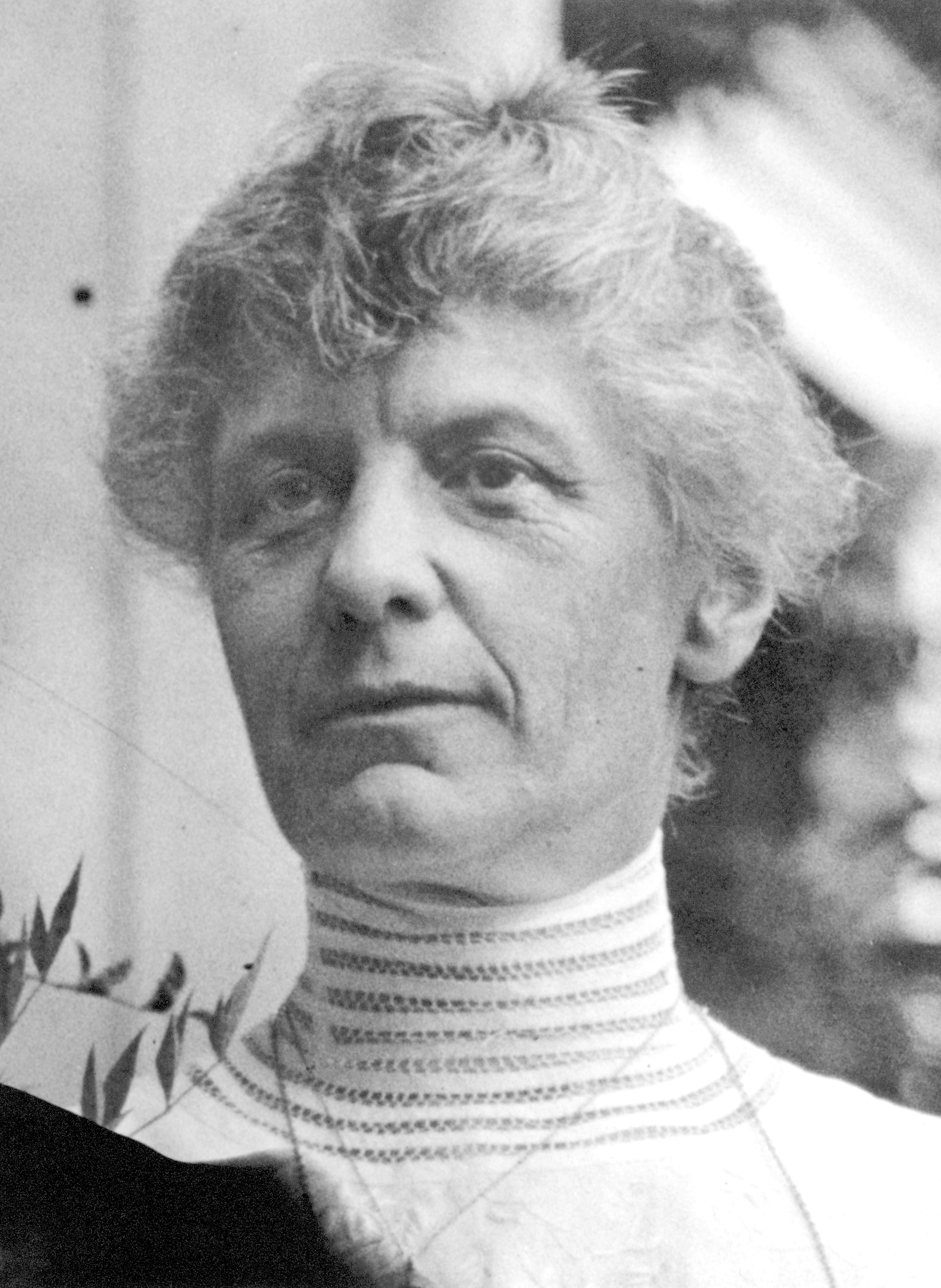
- Born: Ida Bertha Magnét; 6 September 1865; Kalmar, Sweden
- Died: 5 November 1943 (aged 78); Stockholm, Sweden
- Occupations: Photographer, ethnographer
- Spouse: Herman Trotzig

Ida Bertha Trotzig née Magnét (1864–1943) was a Swedish photographer, ethnographer, Japanologist, author and painter. From 1888, together with her husband Herman Trotzig, she spent 33 years in Japan, acquiring a profound interest in Japanese culture, especially the tea ceremony and flower arrangement. On her return to Sweden, in 1935 she managed the establishment of a Japanese tea garden near the Ethnographical Museum in the Djurgården park in central Stockholm.

== Biography ==
Born on 6 September 1865 in Kalmar, Ida Bertha Trotzig was the daughter of Jacob Henrik Magnet and his wife Bertha Amanaide (née Trotzig). When she was 20, she studied painting at the Technical School in Stockholm. In 1888, she married her maternal uncle Herman Trotzig who was firmly established in the foreign enclave in Kobe, Japan. The two had corresponded for a number of years and had grown increasingly fond of each other. They married in Germany where their close family relationship was not a problem. Shortly after their marriage, the couple moved there where her husband became chief of police.

Ida Trotzig spent the next 33 years in Japan, learning the language and taking a great interest in Japanese history and culture, in particular the tea ceremony and the art of flower arrangement, for which she received a diploma. She had spent 10 years studying to be a Japanese tea master, probably becoming the first foreigner to make the grade. In 1911, she published Cha-no-yu, japanernas teeceremoni, a richly illustrated work on the tea ceremony.

Trotzig contributed to Swedish magazines and journals and took up contacts with the Ethnographic Museum when returning to her home country in 1898 and on an extended visit from 1909 to 1912. Following her husband's death in 1921, she settled permanently in Sweden, collaborating more intensively with the museum.

Her major achievement was the establishment of a Japanese tea ceremony house and garden, ceremoniously inaugurated in the Djurgården in 1935. The tea house burnt down in 1969 but in 1990 a new tea house was established in the same location.

Trotzig is also remembered for her collection of Japanese photographs from around 1900 which she left to the Ethnographic Museum.

Ida Trotzig died in Stockholm on 5 November 1943.

== Family ==
Her daughter Inez married director Sven Stenberg in 1917, after which they moved to Japan. There their daughter actress Gaby Stenberg was born in Tokyo in 1923. The same year they moved back to Sweden after the 1923 Great Kantō earthquake. In addition to Inez, Ida and Herman Trotzig had two other daughters, both of whom died in a typhoon.
