= Institut Tessin =

Museum in Paris, France

Coordinates: 48°51′29″N 2°21′44″E

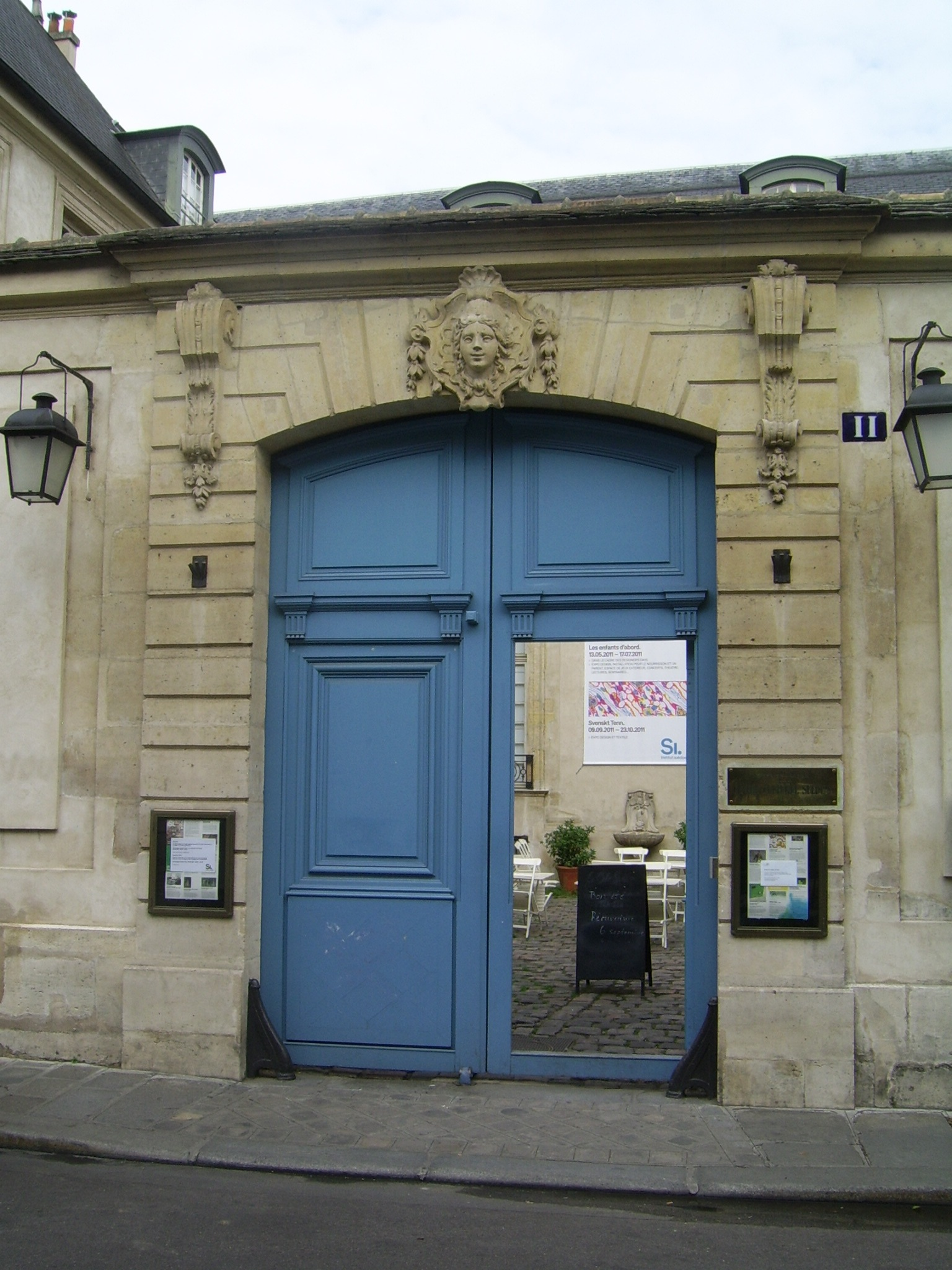
Entrance to the museum

The Institut Tessin, also known as the Centre culturel suédois, is a museum in Paris dedicated to the history of Franco-Swedish artistic exchanges. It is located in the Hôtel de Marle at 11, rue Payenne in the city's 3rd arrondissement, and is open weekdays except Monday; admission is free.

Mediations interculturelles entre la France et la Suède

The museum was established by Gunnar W. Lundberg, art historian and cultural advisor to Sweden's embassy in Paris. It is operated by the Swedish Institute, under the responsibility of the Nationalmuseum in Stockholm, and is the only Swedish culture center located outside of Sweden. The museum contains a permanent collection of works from the 17th to the 20th century, including approximately 600 paintings and more than 5000 books, drawings, prints, and watercolors, as well as sculptures and medals, with notable works by Gustaf Lundberg, Alexander Roslin, Adolf Ulrik Wertmüller, and Louis Jean Desprez. It also contains a theater, library, Swedish cafe, five studios for artists and Swedish researchers, and space for temporary exhibitions.

== See also ==
- France–Sweden relations
- List of museums in Paris
