= Hjördis Piuva Andersson =

Swedish-Tornedalian painter and writer

Hjördis Piuva Andersson (born 10 June 1933) is a Swedish-Tornedalian painter and writer.

Andersson was born in Vojakkala, she currently lives in Övertorneå. She often does paintings of the environment of the Torne Valley. She has also released three books where she tells about her life in the Torne Valley.

== Bibliography ==
- Min barndom i Tornedalen – 1940-talet i målningar, oil paintings with text written in Swedish and Meänkieli, 1994, ISBN 91-630-3001-2
- Bildkalender med tornedalsminnen, oil paintings with text written in Swedish and Meänkieli, 1998, ISBN 91-630-7300-5
- Bilder från ungdomsåren, Watercolor paintings with text written in Swedish, 2002, ISBN 91-631-2658-3
- Ett kattliv – en sann berättelse, 2009
