= GoTV (Austrian TV channel) =

- Country: Austria
- Broadcast area: Europe
- Headquarters: Vienna, Austria

Programming
- Picture format: 576i (16:9 SDTV)

Ownership
- Owner: gotv Fernseh Ges.m.b.H.

History
- Launched: 1 October 2002; 24 years ago
- Closed: 1 June 2022; 4 years ago

Links
- Website: www.gotv.at

GoTV (stylized as gotv) was a 24-hour music and animation channel based in Vienna, Austria. The channel launched on 1 October 2002. The channel targeted audiences in Austria, but was also widely available throughout Europe. On May 18, 2022, the owners of gotv confirmed the channel will close on June 1, 2022. The last music video on the channel was Daft Punk’s ‘One More Time’.

== Background ==
The channel was originally a local cable-only music channel, TIV ("True Image Vision"), launched in 1996 on UPC Telekabel in Vienna. With its success, Go TV CEO Thomas Maderbacher (member of Austrian band The Wiener) became a majority stakeholder in ET Multimedia and helped to launch Go TV on 1 October 2002. It became Austria's first youth and music channel. Upon its launch, it was available to 1 million viewers and available on 50% of digital cable operators in Austria.

The channel expanded into other parts of Europe when it began to broadcast unencrypted via Astra 19.2°E on 1 May 2004. The channel generally targets German-speaking territories, mainly Austria. The channel was also available across Europe and was also available on some digital television providers in Switzerland, the Netherlands, and Germany.

Since February 2022, a number of cable operators in both Austria and Germany dropped the channel. Financial issues with supporting the channel also resulted in the channel closing.

== Strategy ==
The channel features music from established and underground local artists, as well as music particularly from Europe and North America. The channel predominantly used the German language. The channel featured a broad music policy playing a mix of music from pop to rock, hip hop to dance, heavy metal to alternative, and everything in between. Though the channel was primarily marketed towards Austrian TV viewers, the channel was widely available throughout Europe on Astra satellite. The channel also offered viewers the latest news, events guide, competitions, music, and film promos.

== On-air identity ==
The channel has used the same on-air identity since its launch in 2003 with some changes along the way. On-air idents were designed by Zoe Irvine. The channel's presenter an animated logo designed by Axel Stockburger. Idents change depending on the emotions of the Go TV logo.

== Shows ==
=== Shows before the shutdown ===
- At home
- Hosted by
- Homemade
- Play it again
- Clubnight
- Hardplay
- Neu auf go tv
- FM4 charts
- Go tv charts

=== Former shows ===
- Austrian charts
- Austrian indie chart
- Austrian long-play chart
- Austrian singles chart
- US ranking
- UK ranking
- Euro ranking
- German ranking
- Vote
- Nokia music store top 10
- Box
- Too early
- Early enough
- Made in Europe

== Availability ==
- Austria – UPC Austria, Astra 19.2°E, Astra 1N
- Germany – Astra 19.2°E
- Switzerland – Cablecom (German-speaking region), Astra 19.2°E
