= Ester Almqvist =

Swedish painter (1869–1934)

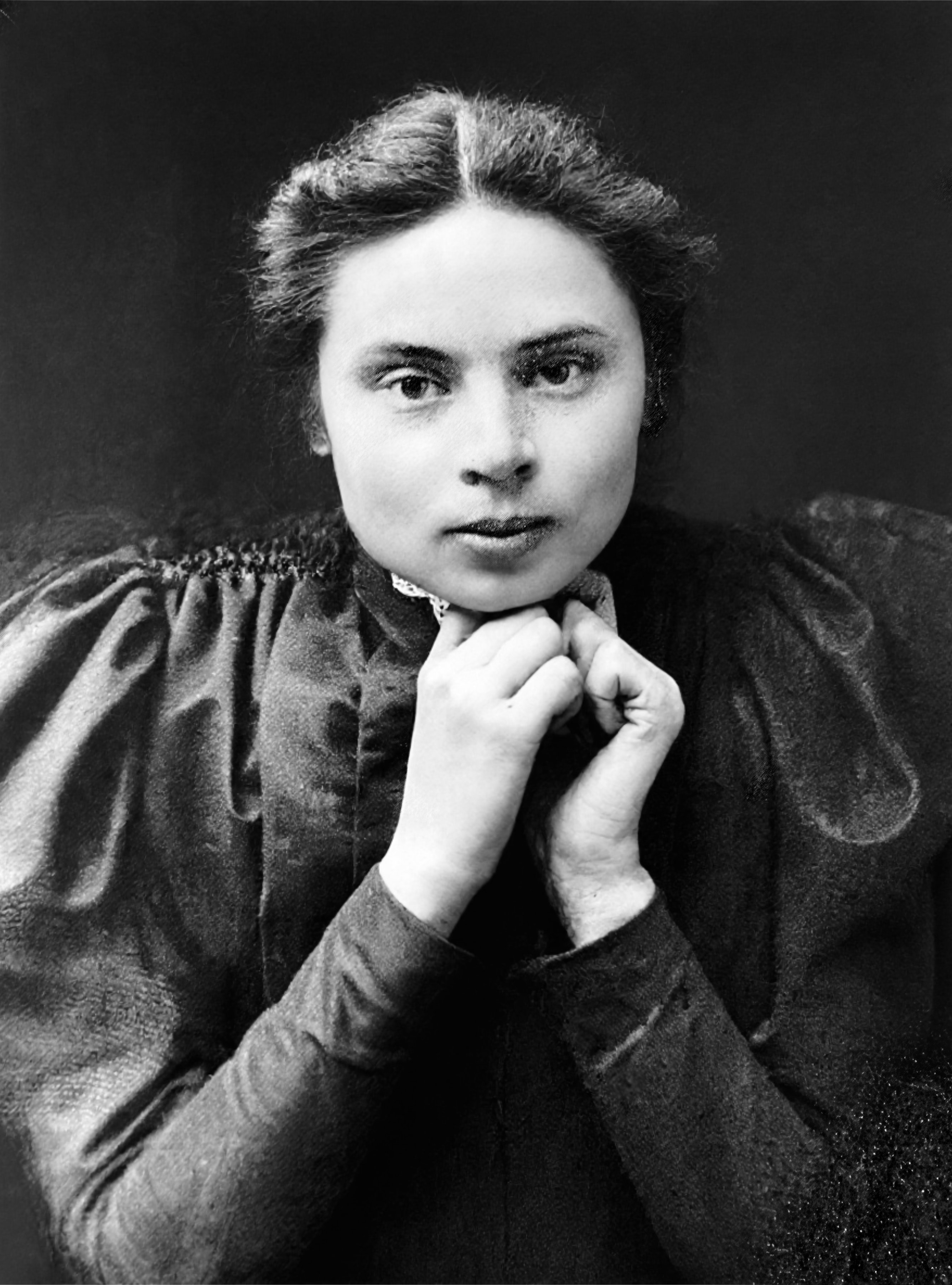
- Almqvist ca. 1890-93
- Born: Ester Dorothea Almqvist; 3 November 1869; Bromma, Sweden
- Died: 11 June 1934 (aged 64); Lund, Sweden
- Education: Valand Academy, Konstnärsförbundets skola
- Known for: Painting
- Movement: Expressionism, Neo-Impressionism, Modernism

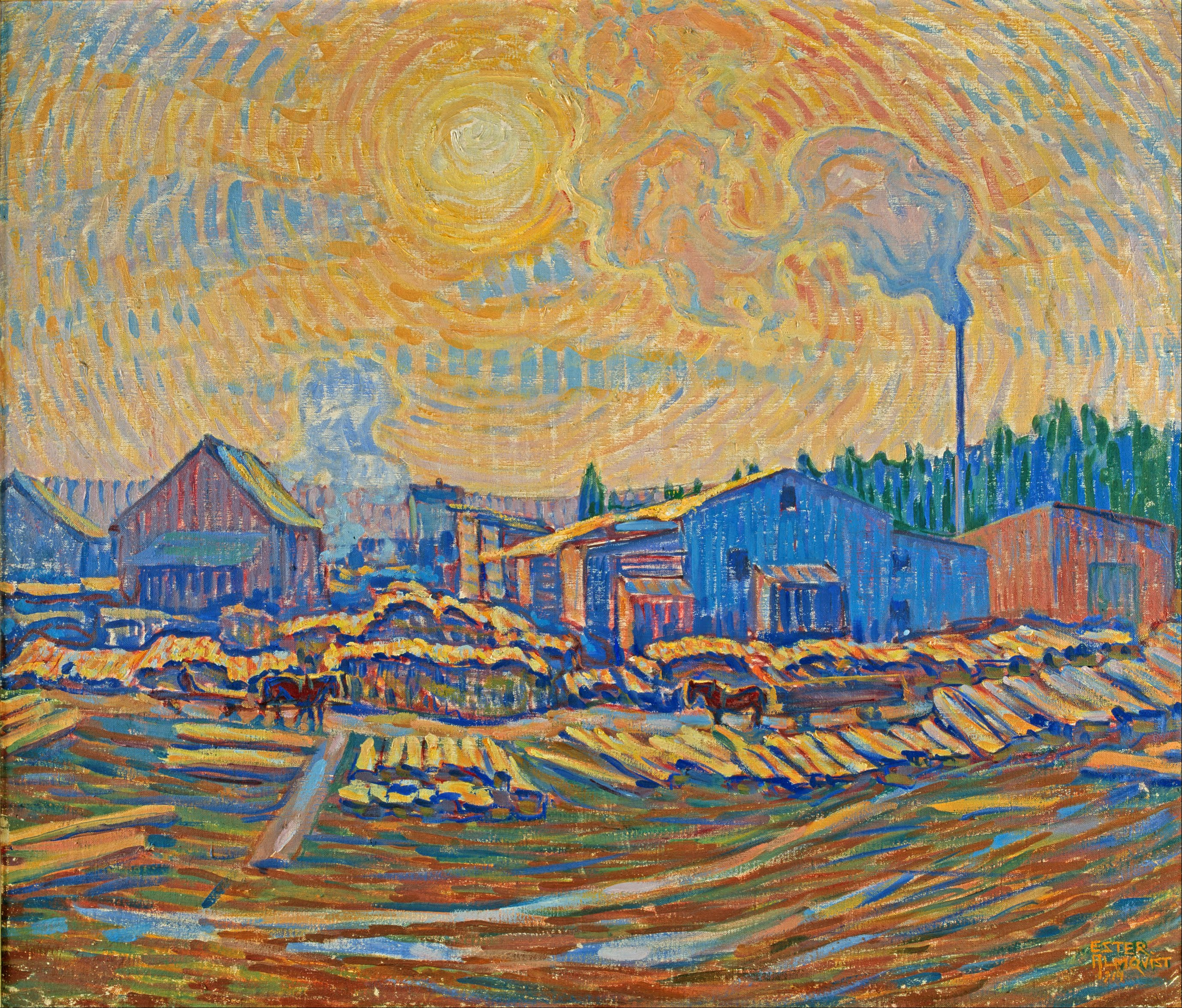
Ester Almqvist, The Sawmill, oil on canvas, 1914.

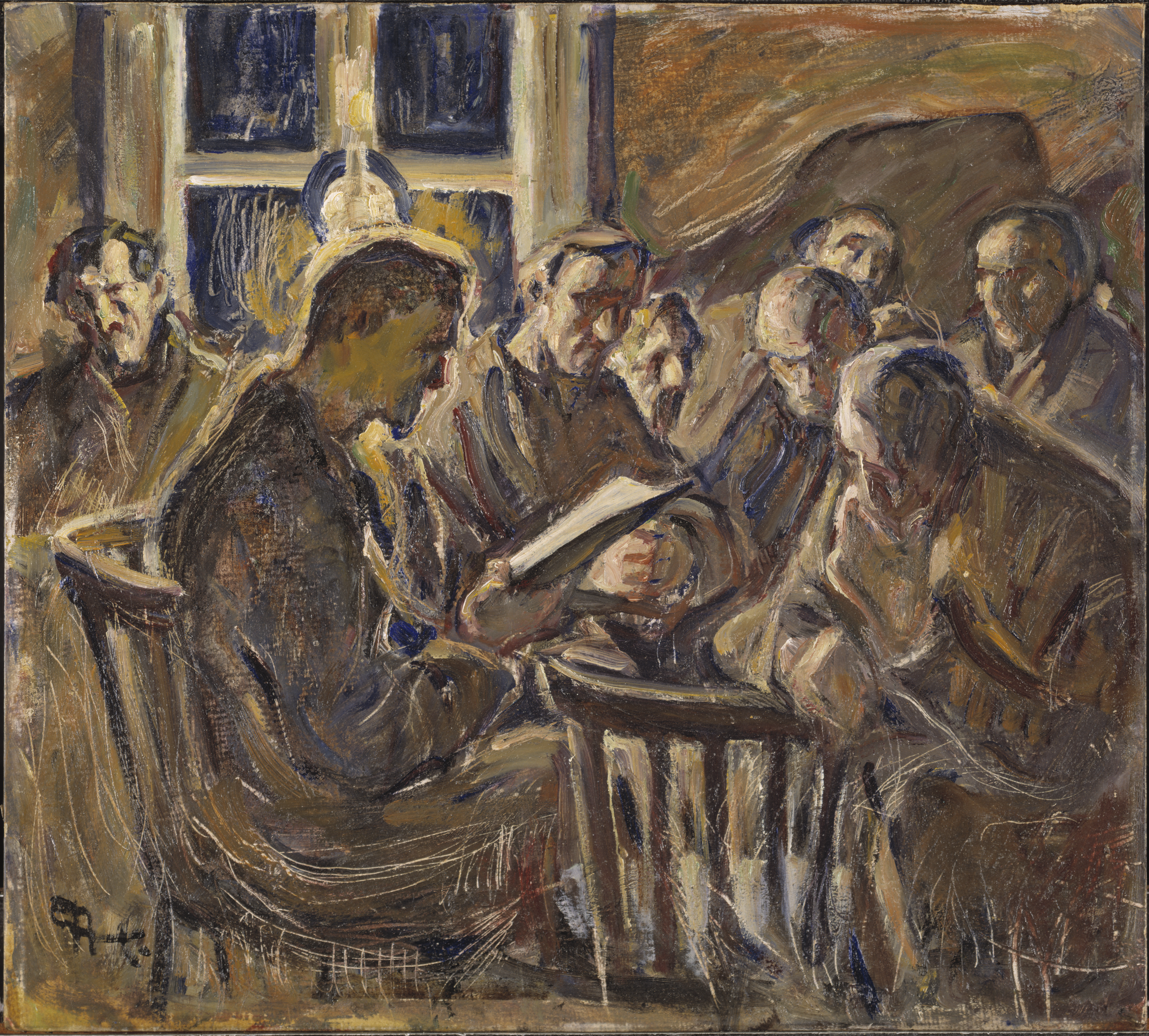
Ester Almqvist, The Meeting, 1929.

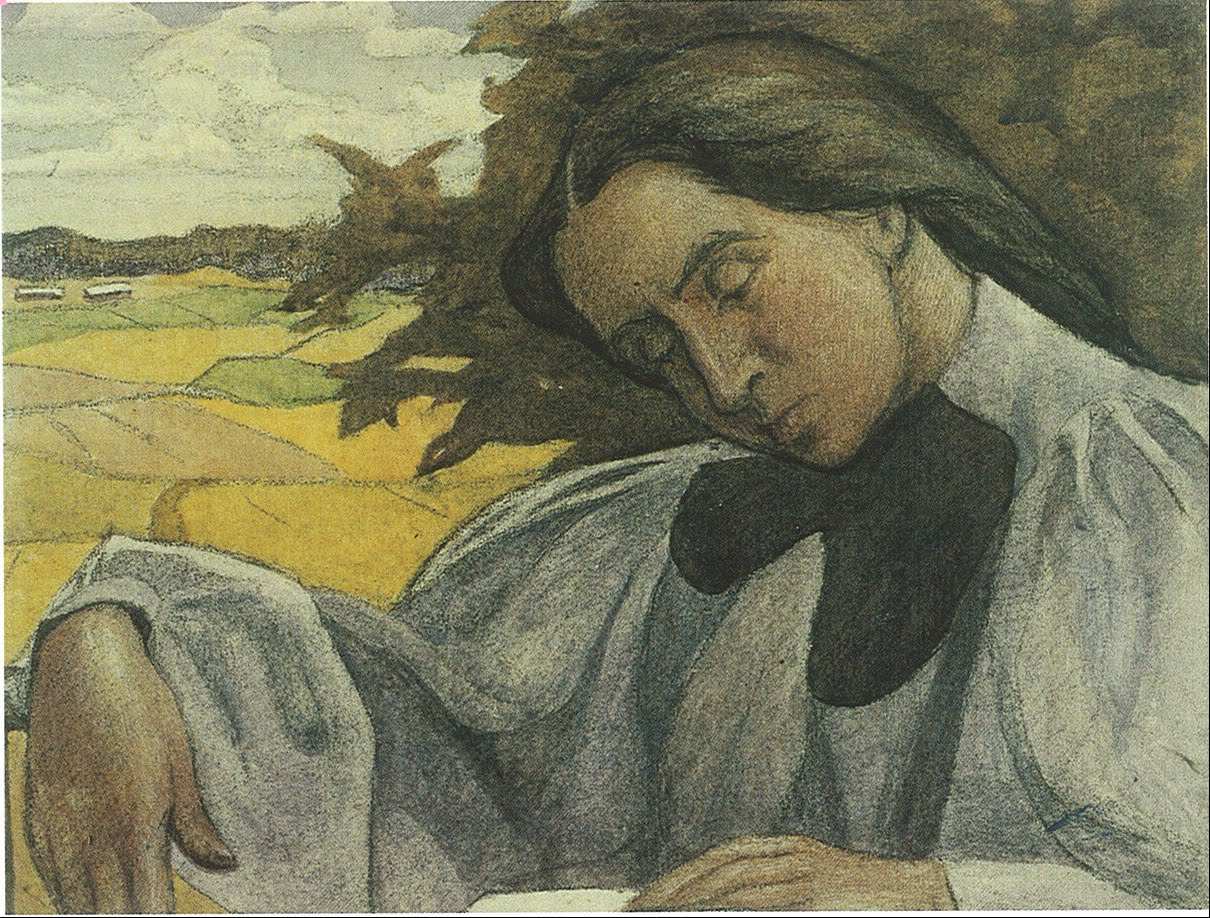
Ester Almqvist, The old fashioned priest's daughter.

Ester Dorothea Almqvist (3 November 1869 – 11 June 1934) was a Swedish artist who was a pioneer of Expressionist painting in Sweden.

== Family and education ==
Almqvist was born in Bromma but spent her childhood in Stockholm, where her parents taught in a school for Christian missionaries. She is the female artist who is represented with most artworks in the collections of Malmö Konstmuseum, a total of 2,083 pieces. She had specified in her will that her collection of oil and watercolour paintings, charcoal, pastel and ink drawings, graphic pages and sketchbooks should be donated to that particular museum. Her father, a priest, died when she was nine. Her mother worked as a private tutor and book seller for the sake of providing for her family. Almqvist was born with a deformed spine that limited her mobility throughout her life but also gave her freedom to study art instead of being confined to housework.

She attended the Technical School in Stockholm, graduating in 1891, and she studied art privately with the painter Gustaf Cederström. She continued her art studies at the Valand Art Academy in Gothenburg (1892–1893) where she studied under Richard Bergh and Carl Larsson. After their mentorship came to an end, Larsson dedicated an etching to Almqvist, describing her as a "talented, noble, and fine creature." Almqvist then studied at the Konstnärsförbundets skola in Stockholm (1894–1895). Her other teachers included Per Hasselberg and Bruno Liljefors. While in school, she supported herself by commercial book illustration work. Later, she was a member of the women's association Nya Idun.

== Art career ==
Almqvist spent most of her working life in Lund, and some of her best-known paintings are of the surrounding areas of Skåne province. She began exhibiting in the late 1890s and participated in the 1904 St. Louis World's Fair.

Almqvist's early work is Impressionist in style and conforms to what was then the prevailing mood of gentle melancholy in Swedish painting. After her mother's death she turned to Expressionism, and her mature paintings from about 1913 onward share a strong kinship with the work of Vincent van Gogh, featuring vigorous brushwork, strong colors, and heavy lines.

Almqvist belonged to a group of Swedish women artists who traveled, worked, exhibited, and sometimes lived together, including Tora Vega Holmström, Agnes Wieslander, and Maja Fjæstad. In her last year of life, when back pain made it impossible to work, a younger generation of women artists, such as Vera Nilsson, Mollie Faustman, and Siri Derket mounted an exhibition of her work in Stockholm honoring her as an early Swedish modernist. Broader recognition came only after her death in 1934, however. Another exhibit was organized in Lund at the Skånska Konstmuseum a year after she died by a friend Nils Gösta Sandblad. Four years after she died, a retrospective was held at the Galerie Moderne in Brussels. In Almqvist's will, she insisted her artwork would be donated to the Malmö Art Museum. Her work is now in the collection of the Swedish National Museum, the Gothenburg Art Museum, the Malmö Art Museum, and other institutions, and she is widely recognized as a pioneer of Expressionism in Sweden.

In 1992, her painting entitled The Meeting (Swedish: Sammankomsten, 1929) was chosen for a Swedish postage stamp honoring Article 20 of the Universal Declaration of Human Rights, which protects freedom of association.

Her papers are held by Lund University.

== Works ==
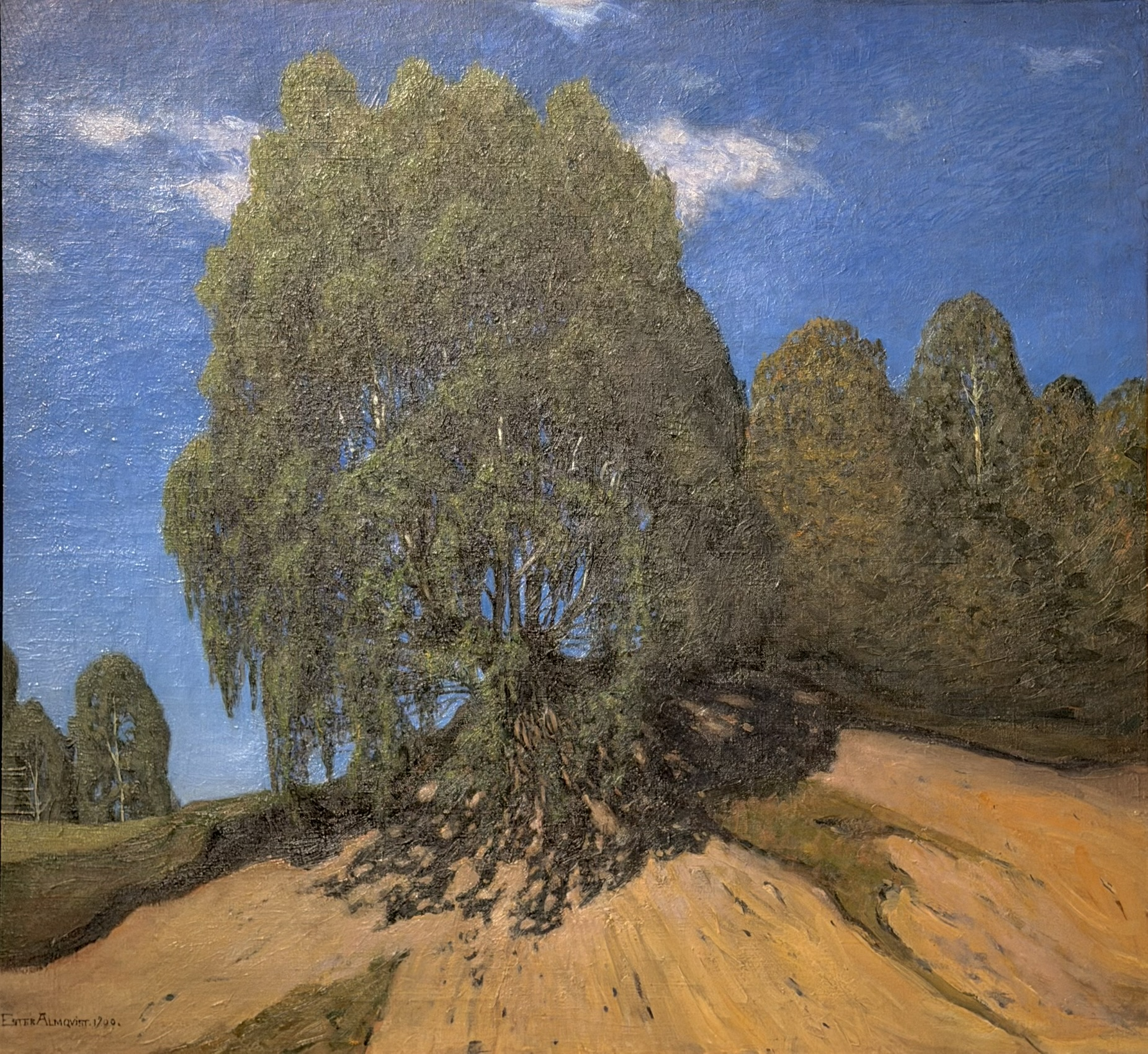
The Weeping Birch, 1900

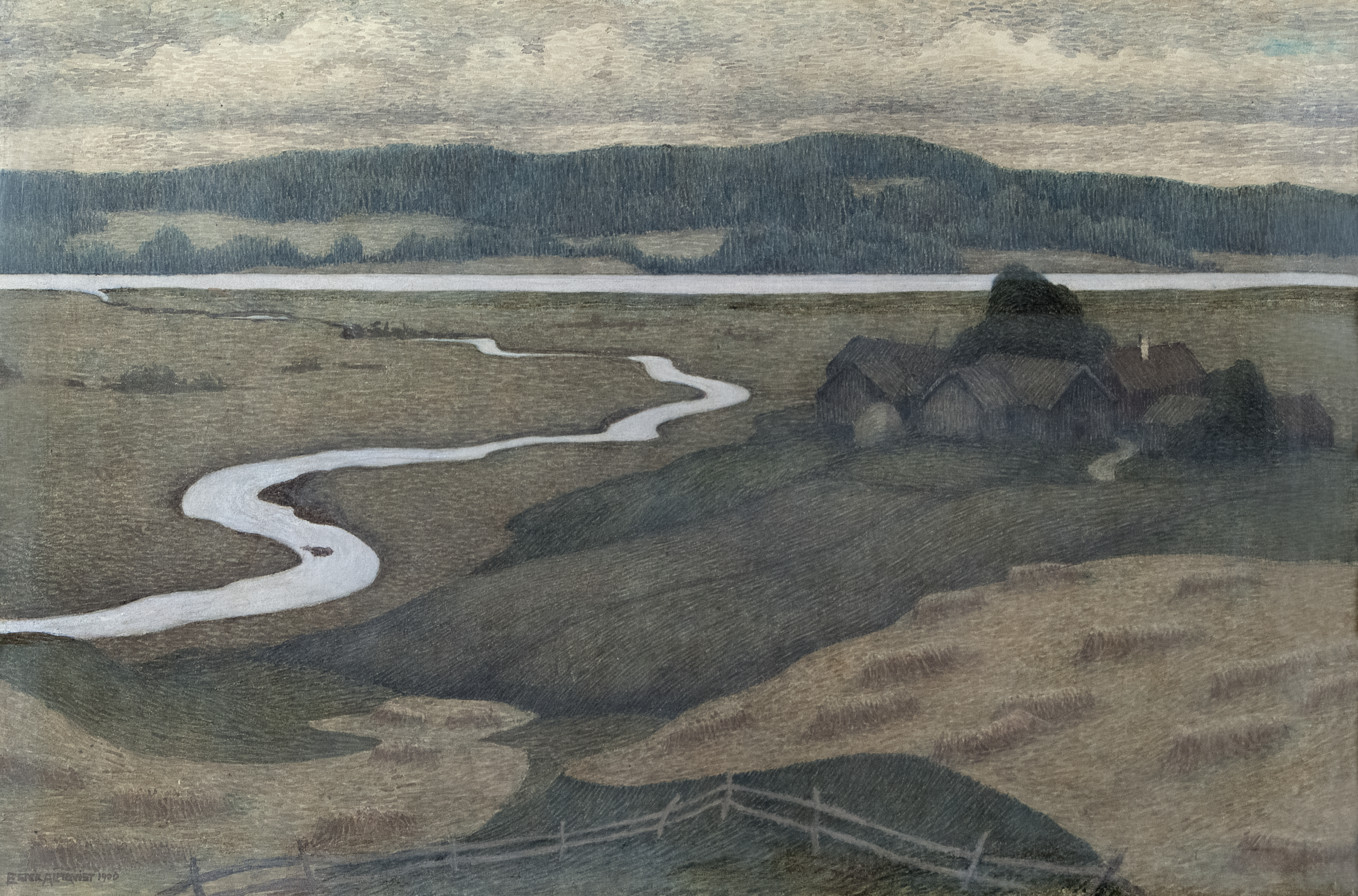
Landscape from Svartådalen, 1900

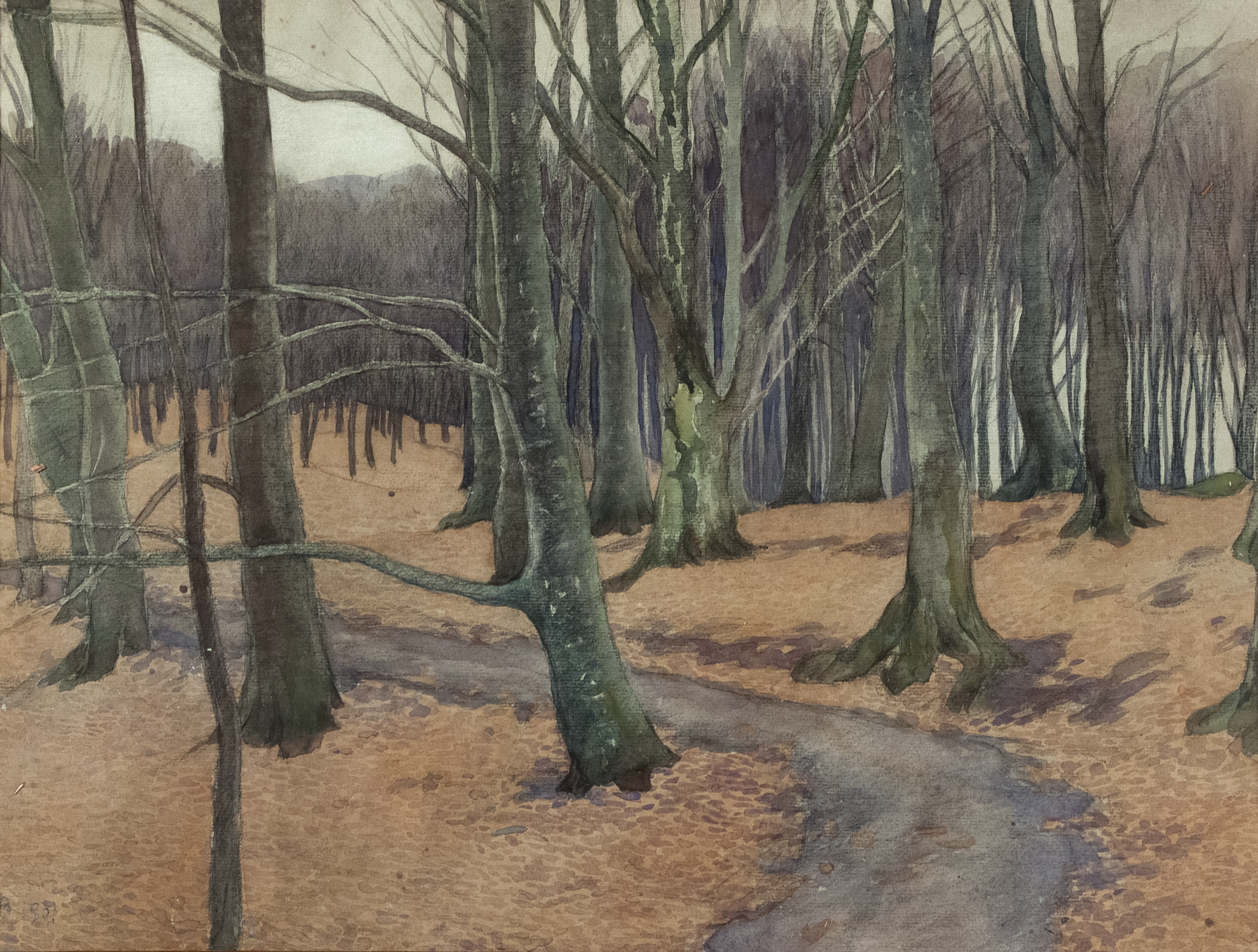
Young Beech Woods, 1901

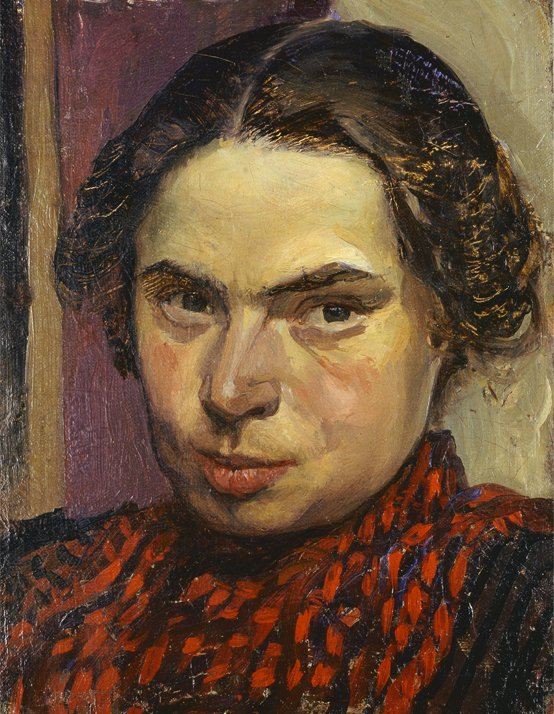
Self portrait, 1901

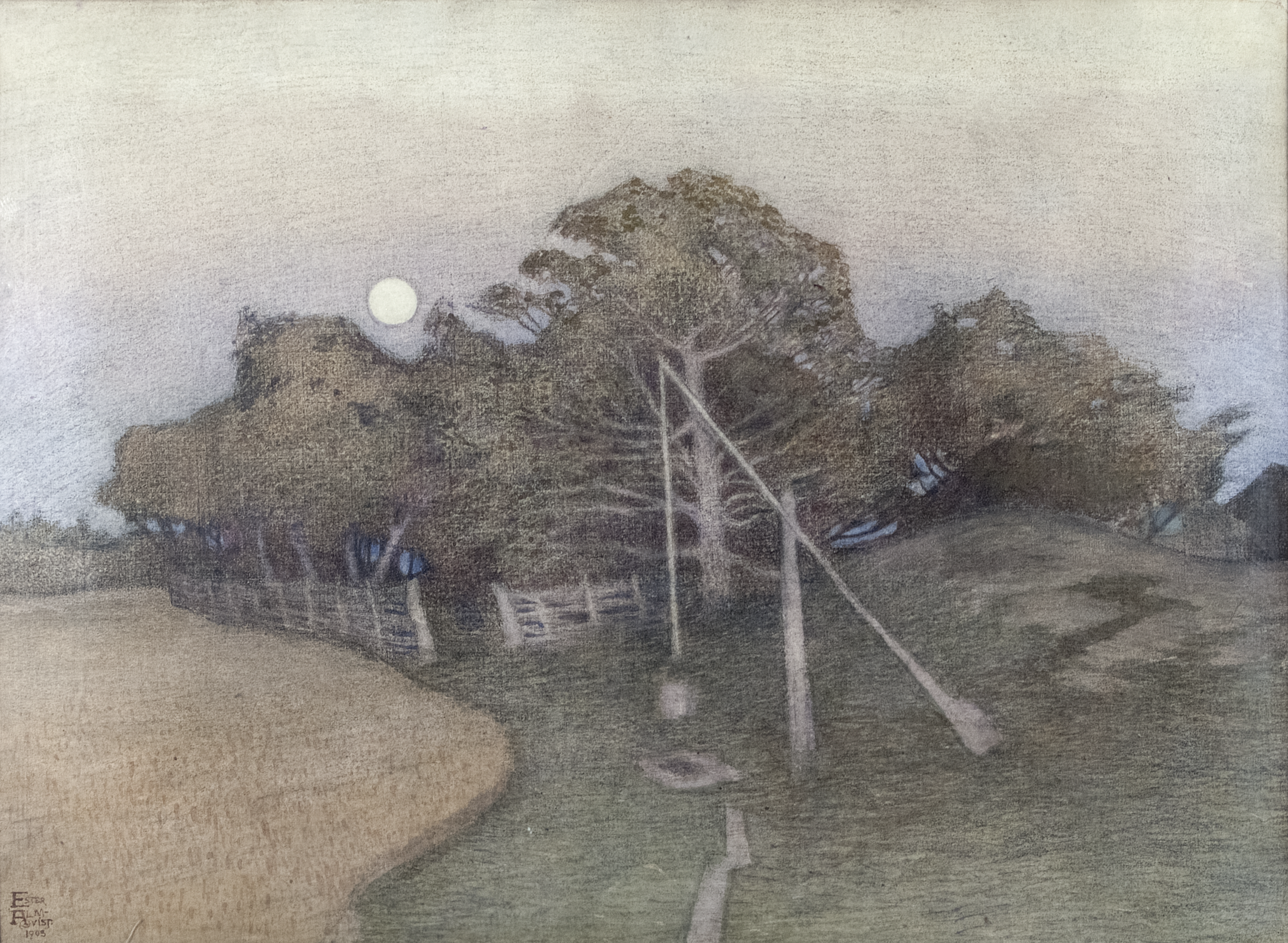
Beyond the Farm, 1903

Village on the coast, 1911

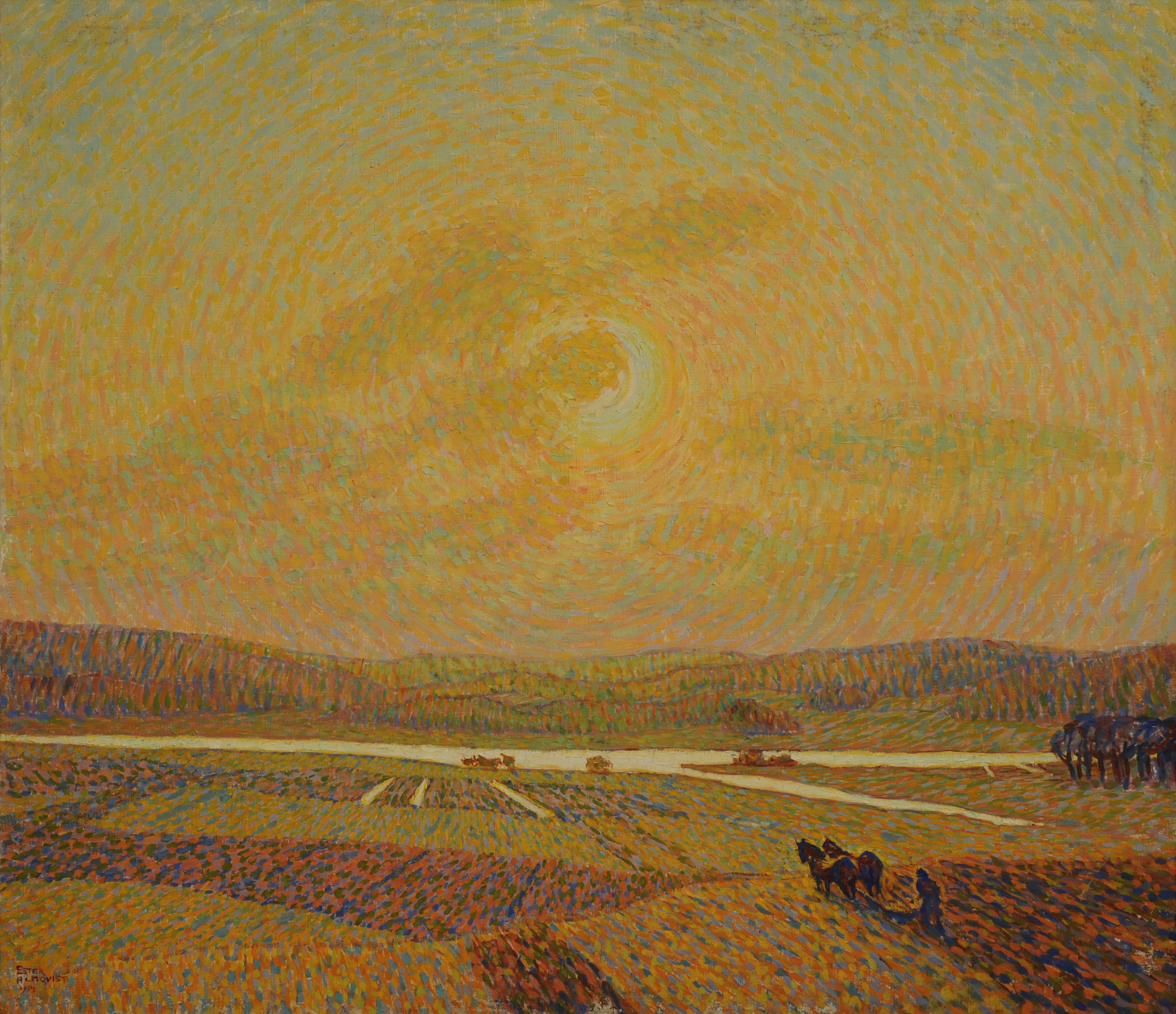
November Ploughing, 1914

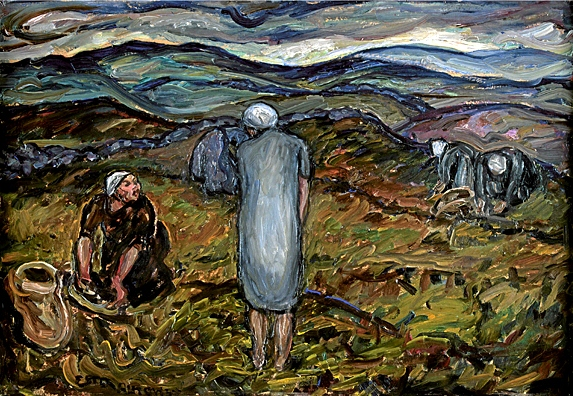
Lingonberry pickers on Hallandsåsen, 1928

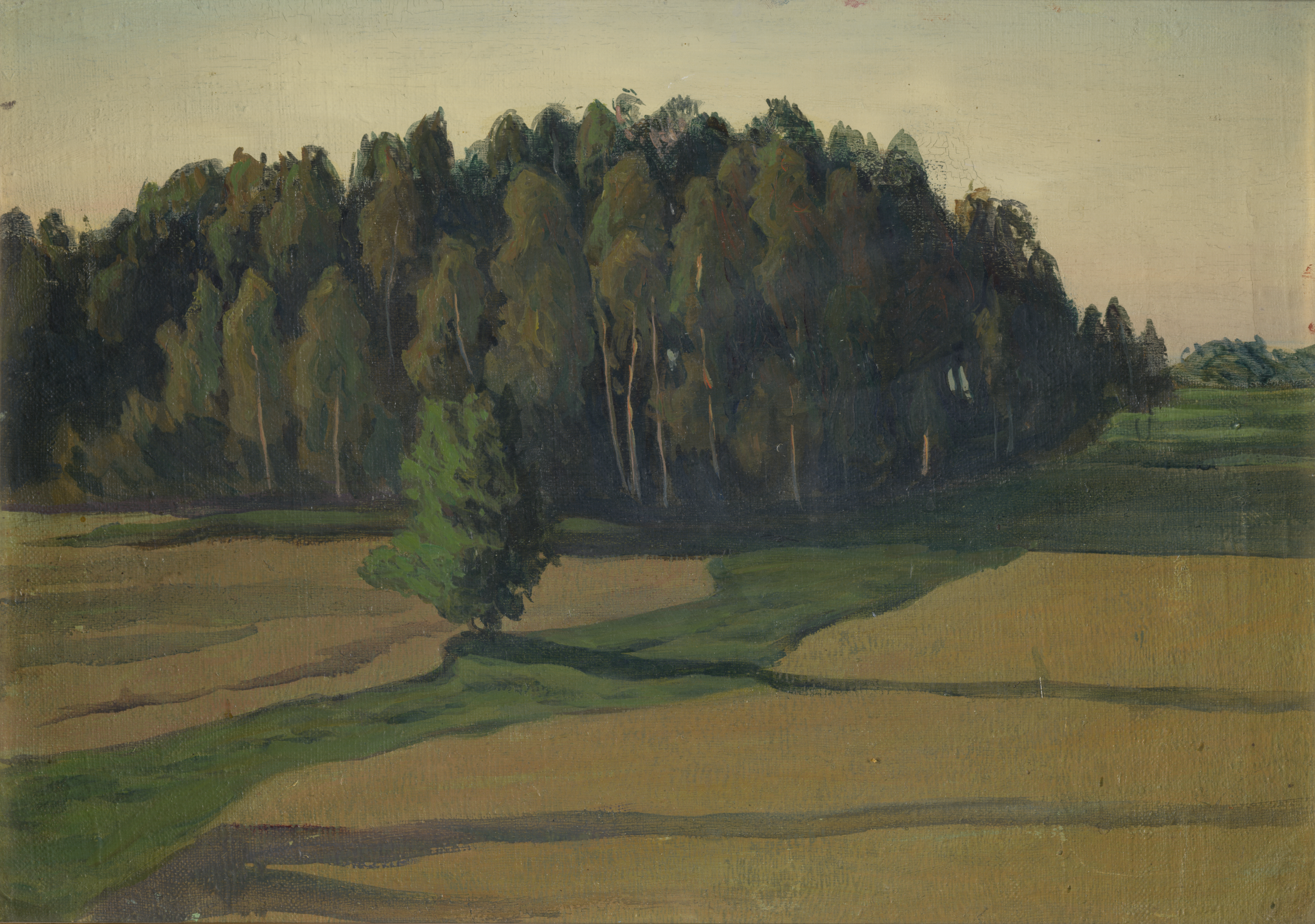
Fields and forest, undated

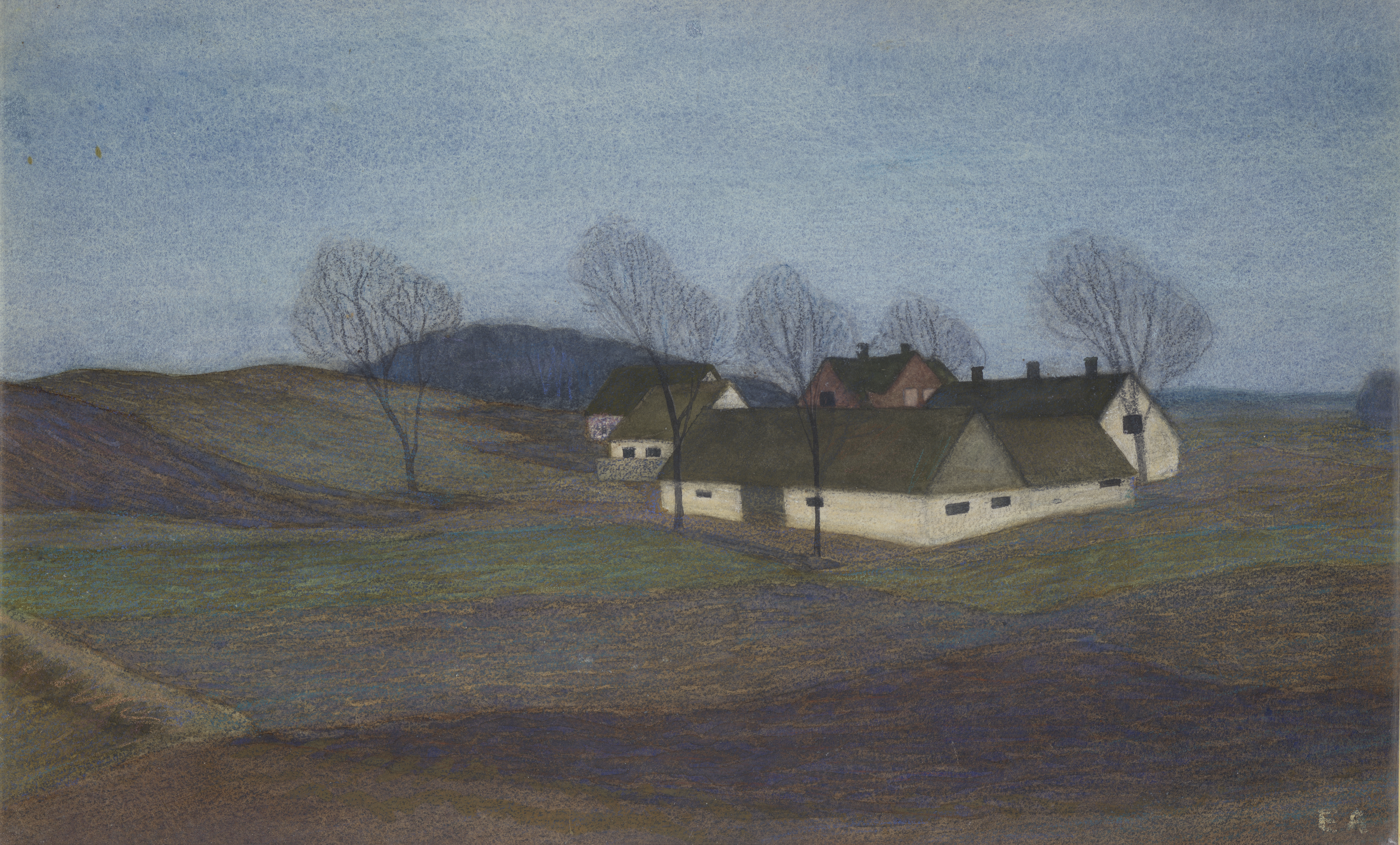
A Farm House in Själland, undated

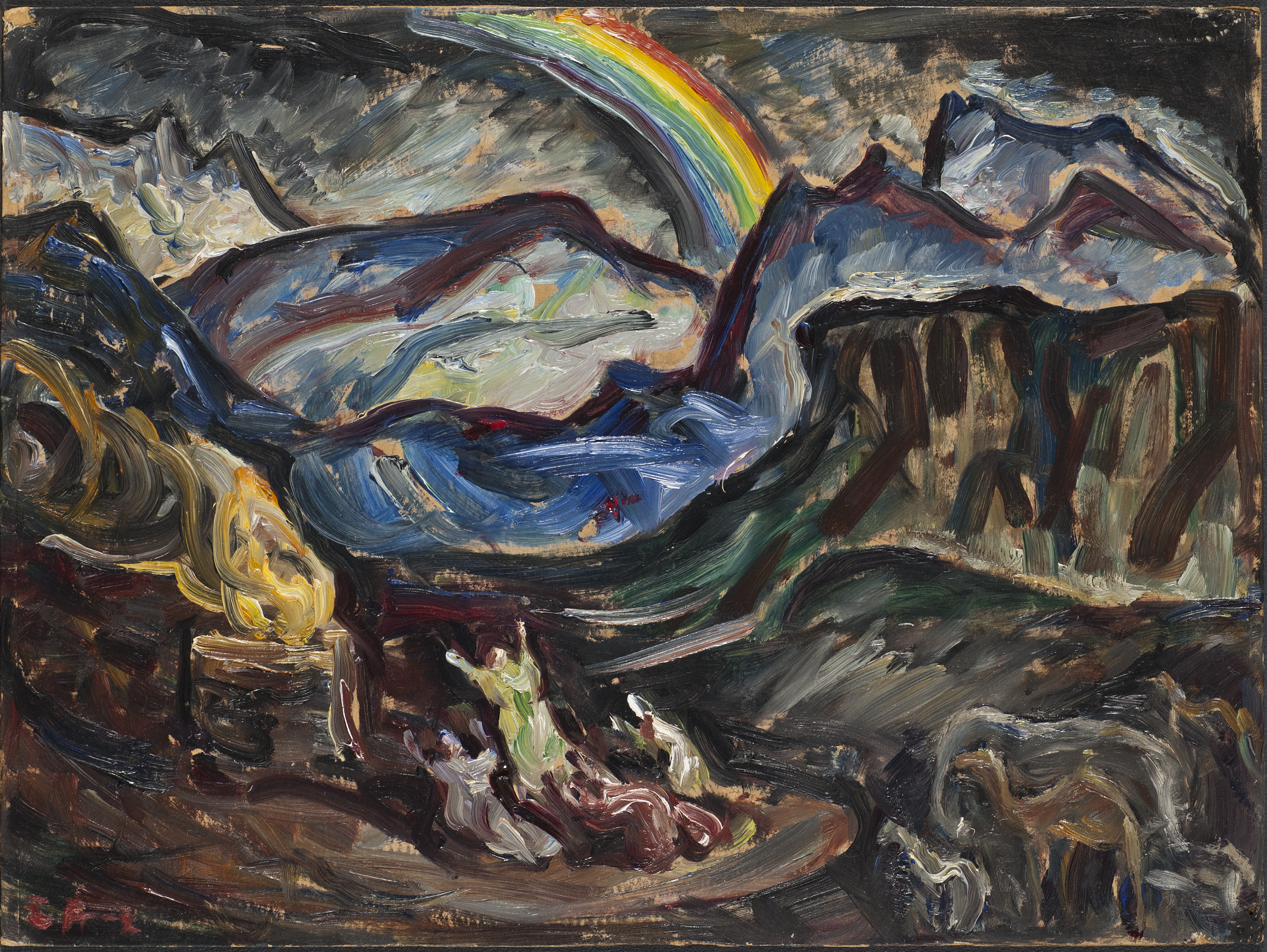
Noah's Thank-offering, undated
