= Maggie Gripenberg =

Finnish dancer (1881–1976)

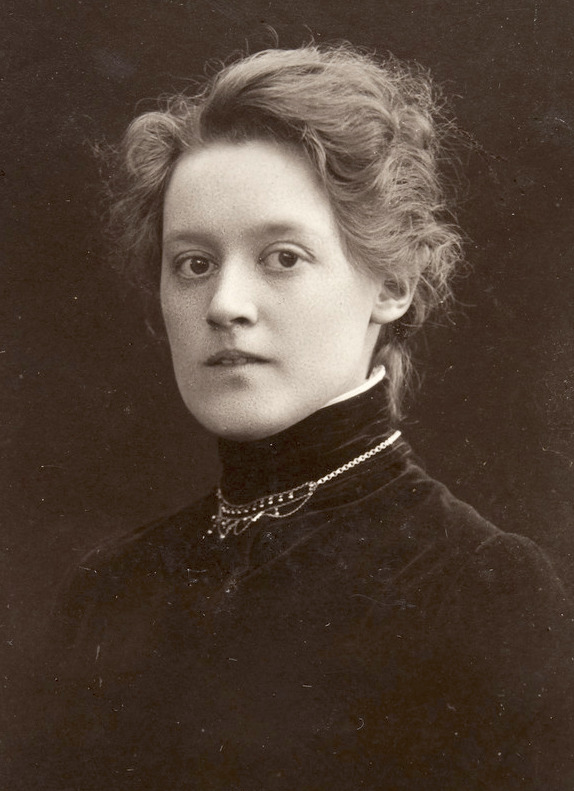
- Gripenberg (c. 1904)
- Born: 11 June 1881; Helsinki, Grand Duchy of Finland
- Died: 28 July 1976 (aged 95); Mariehamn, Åland
- Occupation(s): Dancer, choreographer
- Years active: 1911–1961
- Known for: Introducing Dalcroze Eurhythmics to Finland

Margarita Maria “Maggie” Gripenberg (11 June 1881 – 28 July 1976) was a pioneer of modern dance in Finland. She was the first to introduce Dalcroze Eurhythmics to Finland and modeled her early works on the improvisational style of Isadora Duncan. As a dancer, choreographer and teacher, she laid the educational foundations for the study of movement and dance. She was recognized by numerous awards for her choreographic work as well as being honored with the Pro Finlandia Medal and as a knight of the Order of the White Rose of Finland.

== Early life ==
Margarita Maria Gripenberg was born on 11 June 1881 in Helsinki to Hilma Johanna Elisabet Lindfors and Odert Sebastian Gripenberg. Her father was an architect, who would become the Chief Executive Officer of General Government Buildings. He also served in the Senate and at the end of his career at the Helsinki Savings Bank. Gripenberg was the oldest child of the three siblings. Her brother Hans Henrik Sebastian (born 1882) would become a marine engineer and her sister was Aili Johanna Elisabet (born 1885). Her aunt, Alexandra Gripenberg was a leader in the Finnish women's rights movement. From a young age, Gripenberg wanted to become a dancer and often performed for family gatherings. Because of the family social position, her aspirations were viewed as unacceptable, though her parents did encourage her to study the arts, such as singing, piano and painting.

After completing her undergraduate studies at the Finnish Academy of Fine Arts, Gripenberg enrolled in painting courses, studying in Helsinki from 1903 to 1904. She then continued her education in Dresden, where in 1905, she saw a performance of Isadora Duncan, which became an inspiration. Between 1906 and 1909, Gripenberg continued her art courses in Paris, though she was increasingly unsatisfied with the direction her education. In 1909, Gripenberg was asked to take over instruction for movement at the Finnish National Theatre by the director. Feeling unqualified for the task, she agreed to take the post on the condition that she complete additional classes on dance. She went to Stockholm where she studied briefly with Anna Behle who then took her to Geneva, to enable the pair to train with Émile Jaques-Dalcroze over the summer of 1910. To finance a longer period of study, Behle and Gripenberg toured in southern Norway and Sweden, performing such works as Titus by Arvid Järnefelt, allowing them to take a longer course at the Dalcroze Institute in Dresden by the fall. Gripenberg quickly progressed and in June 1911, received her diploma.

== Career ==
Gripenberg debuted at the National Theater on 13 November 1911, dancing barefoot to music by Chopin, Gluck, Rachmaninoff, Sibelius and others. Critics were unanimous in their acclaim for her performance, though her aunt Alexandra urged her if she were to continue to perform, to adopt a pseudonym. In flowing costumes, and dancing in rhythmic free style, she pioneered modern dance in Finland. Refusing to take her aunt's suggestion, Gripenberg's choice soon led to other upper-class women such as Irja Hagfors, Hertta Idman, Sara Jankelow, and others to become dancers and still others to enroll their children in her dance classes. Before she joined in a partnership with Onni Gabriel Snell in 1915, most of her performances were as a soloist or with her students. In 1912, she was portrayed along with her dance company in an oil painting by Wilho Sjöström in Greek costumes. In 1914, she began teaching at the Sibelius Academy simultaneously with her work at the National Theater.

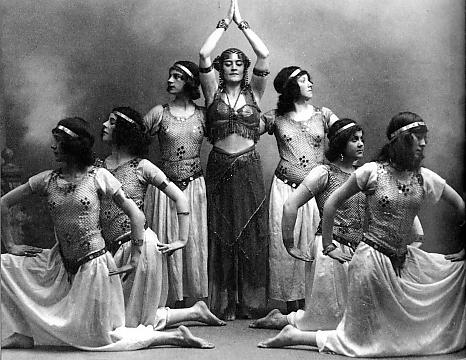
Maggie Gripenberg (center) in 1916 performance of Peer Gynt

Throughout the 1910s and 1920s, Gripenberg toured with her dance company in the Baltic states, England, Sweden and in the United States. Her partnership with Onni, with whom she performed duets like Bacchanale, Pan and Nymph and Two Gypsies, ended after a tour in the US in 1921, when he chose to remain there to dance. Gripenberg then occasionally danced with Kaarlo Eronen and Elo Kuosmanen. In 1918, she danced in Georg af Klercker's film Nobelpristagaren (Nobel Prize Winner), which would be her only role on film. Increasingly she worked as a choreographer, completing over 100 dances throughout her career. Some of her most known works were choreographies for Orfeus (1926) based upon Gluck's Orfeo ed Euridice, Stormen (The Tempest, 1929) by Sibelius, The Dybbuk by S. Ansky (1934), and the Topelius and Melartin version of Sleeping Beauty (1937).

After 1932, Gripenberg focused exclusively on teaching and choreographic works, leaving performance to other artists. Her choreography, influenced by Duncan, took improvisation and developed it into modern dance, changing lyrical visualization into stylized geometric, strong movements. Musical rhythm, with smooth steps in which the toes were place on the floor and flexed before the heel touched the ground and controlled arms, which added to the overall design of the dance were hallmarks of her style. She won first prize for her choreography on small-group composition at the 1939 Brussels Concours International de Danse, with a 5-women ensemble performing Gossip, Percussion Instrument Étude and Slavery. In 1945 she received third place for her Life Continues at the Stockholm Les Archives Internationales de la Danse competition and in 1947, repeated the third prize for Misguided, in the same competition held in Copenhagen. As a teacher, while continuing throughout her career at the National Theater and at Sibelius Academy until 1952, Gripenberg maintained a private studio. She also taught from 1934 to 1951 at the Swedish Theatre, from 1938 to 1949 at the University of Helsinki and at numerous summer camps and festivals. During summers, she taught abroad at venues in Denmark and Sweden. As a writer, she published critiques and articles on dance for newspapers and magazines, as well as her autobiography, Rytmin lumoissa (Spellbound by Rhythm, 1950).

Gripenberg's work was recognized by three medals from Finland. She received the participation medal for the War for Freedom, 1939/40 and was awarded the Pro Finlandia Medal of the Order of the Lion of Finland in 1951. She was honored as a knight in the Order of the White Rose in 1961. Having never married, Gripenberg retired with a friend to Åland.

== Death and legacy ==
Gripenberg died on 28 July 1976 in Mariehamn and was one of the first women to be buried at Helsinki's Artists Knoll in the Old Cemetery. She is recognized as a pioneer in movement and for bringing the rhythmic style of Dalcroze to Finland. Her ideas laid the foundation for Eurhythmy as an educational study in Finland.

== Gallery ==
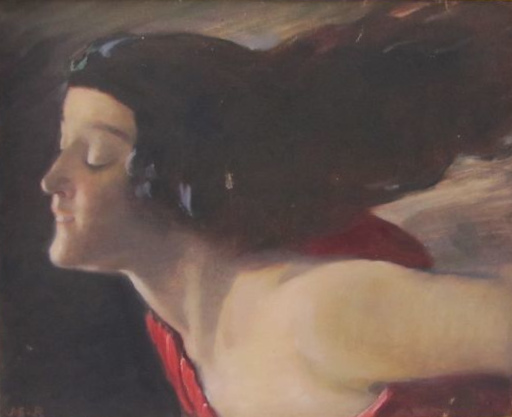
Gripenberg dancing by Venny Soldan-Brofeldt, 1907

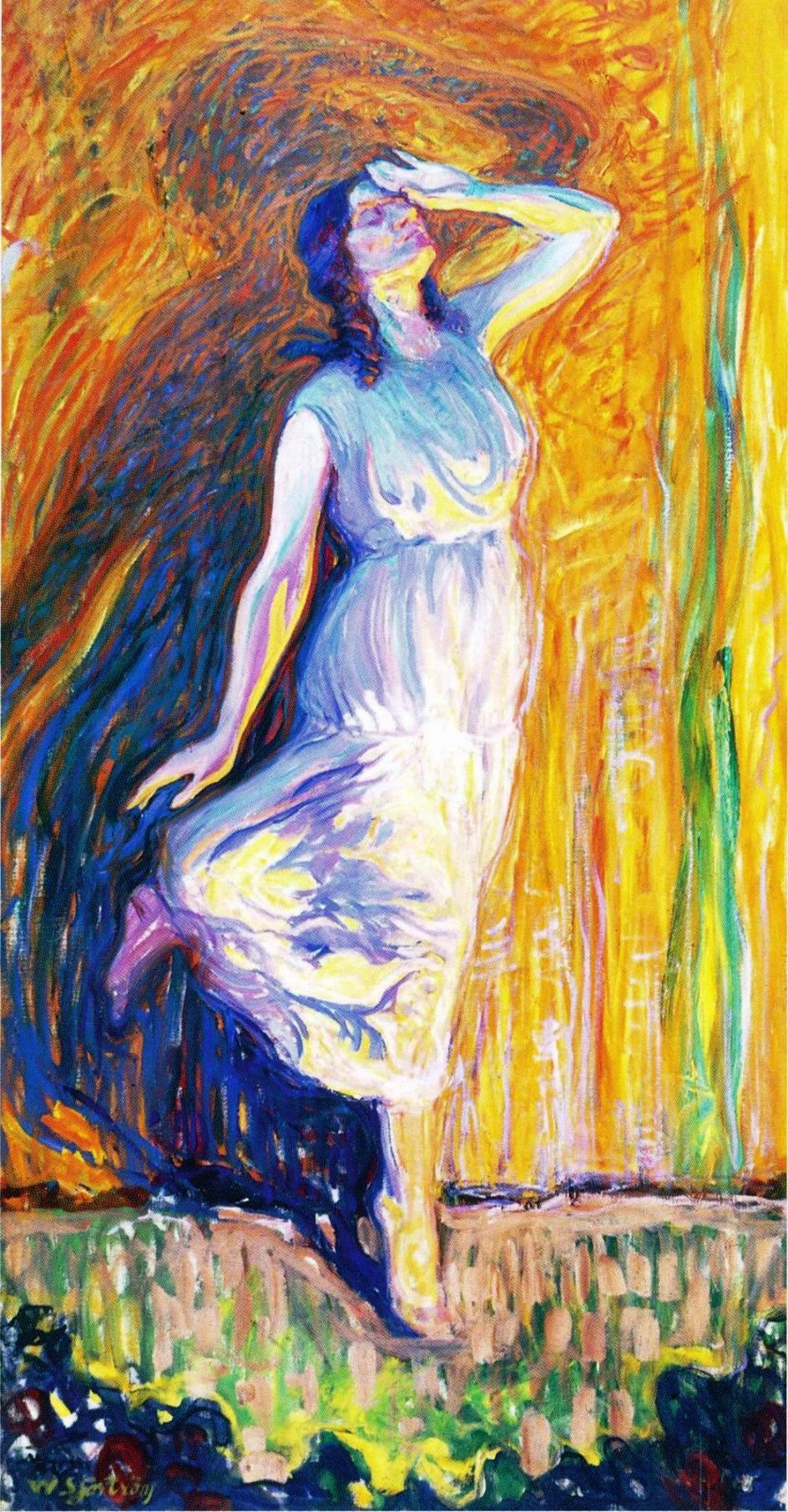
Gripenberg dancing by Wilho Sjöström, 1912

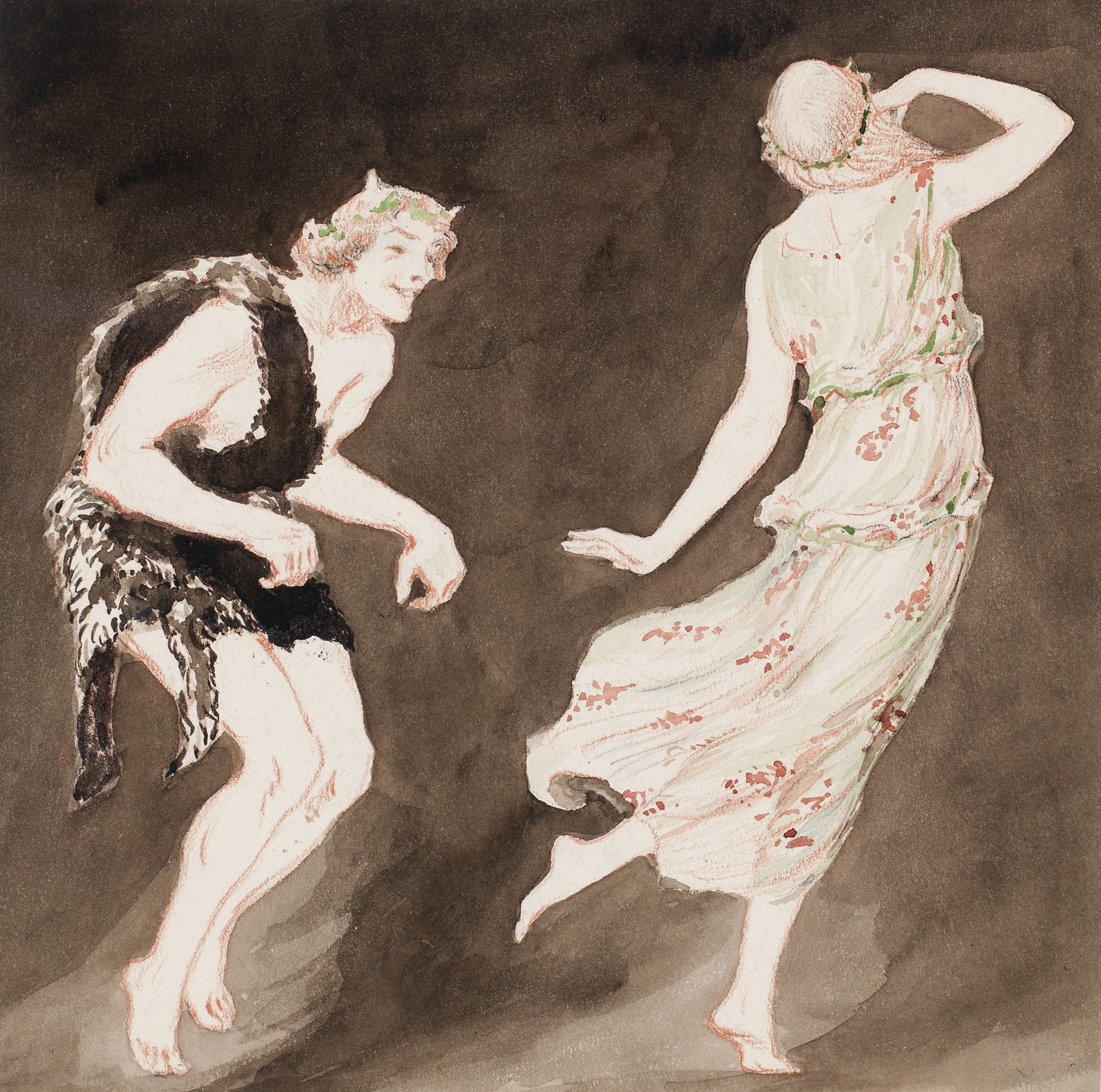
Gripenberg as Syrinx dancing with Pan, by Venny Soldan-Brofeldt in 1910s

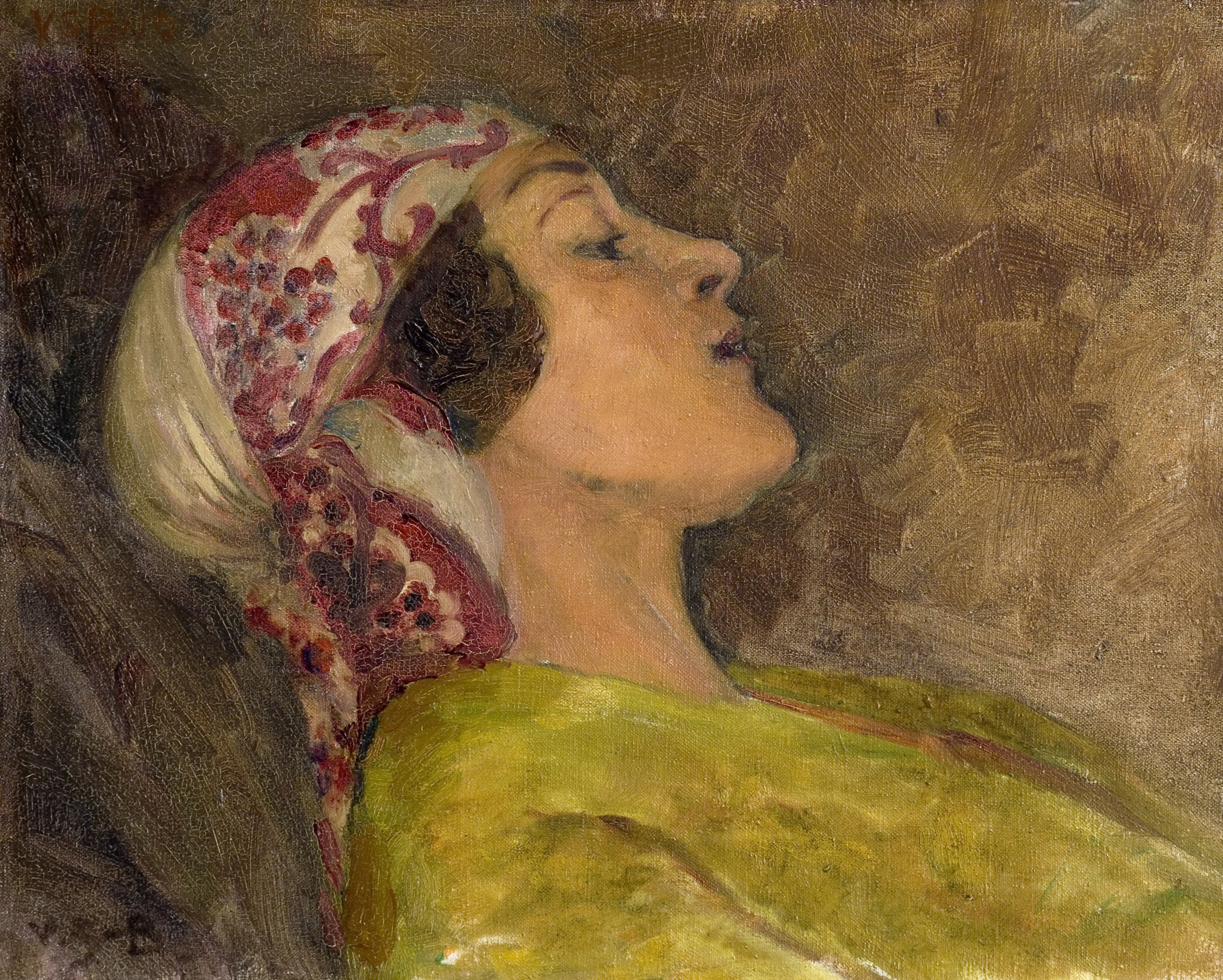
Maggie by Soldan-Brofeldt in 1916

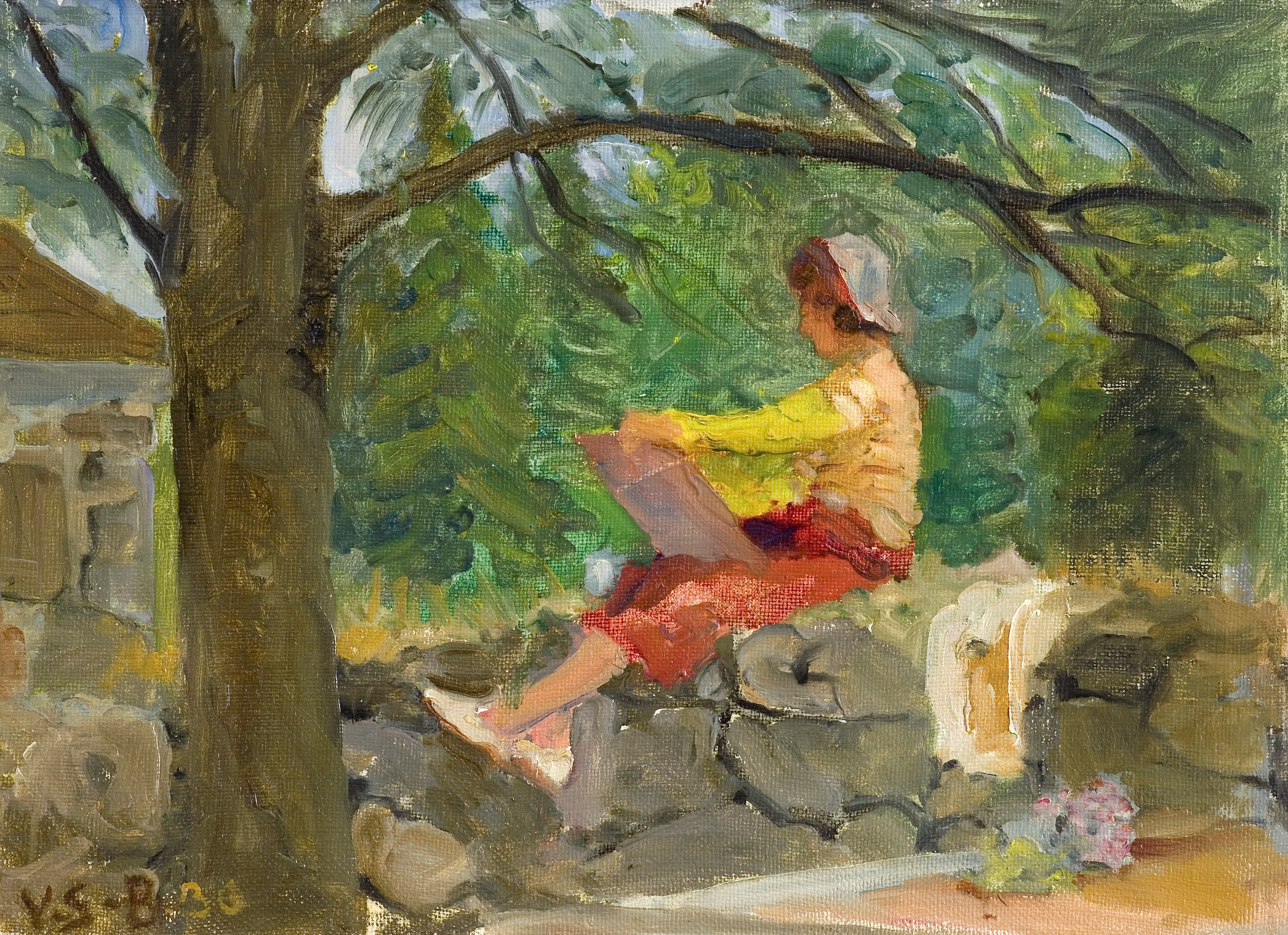
Drawing in 1936, as painted by Soldan-Brofeldt
