= Agnes Wieslander =

Swedish painter (1873–1934)

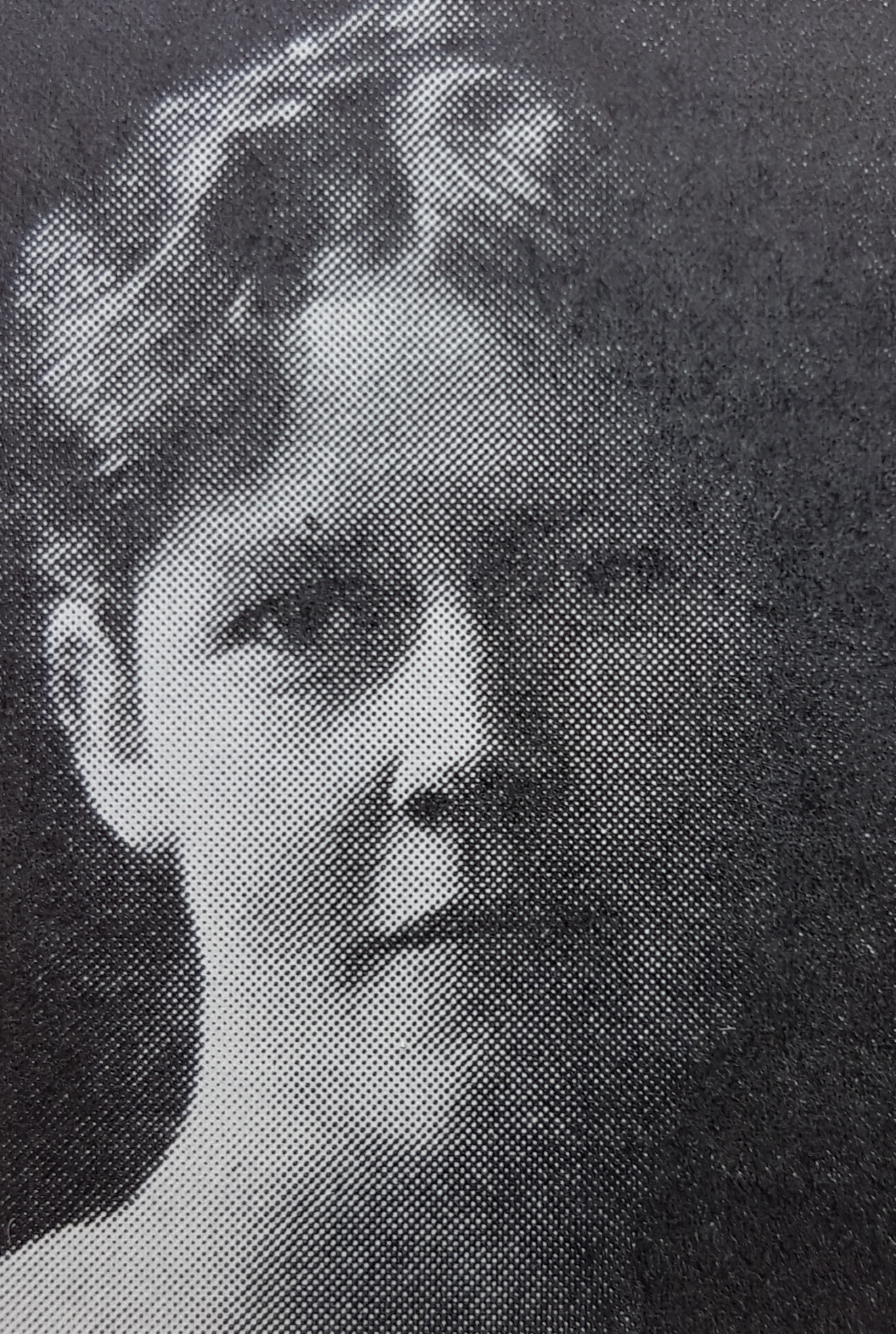
Agnes Wieslander

Agnes Wieslander (1873–1934) was a Swedish painter who mainly produced landscapes although she also painted still lifes and portraits. Her art education included Harald Foss in Copenhagen, the Académie Colarossi in Paris, Carl Wilhelmson in Gothenburg and Adolf Hölzel in Stuttgart. In 1913, she was one of the founding members of Konstnärsgruppen (The Artists' Group). Suffering from poor health, she had to abandon art in the 1920s. One of her works is in the collection of Nationalmuseet. Several more can be seen in the Malmö Art Museum.

== Biography ==
Born on 21 July 1873 in Hjärnarp near Karlstad, Agnes Wieslander was the daughter of the judge Svante Vitalis Wieslander and his wife Caroline née Andersson. She was the youngest of five children. Although she began to paint in the 1880s, she did not study art until 1896 when she took lessons under Harald Foss in Copenhagen. After the turn of the century, she attended the women's school Académie Colarossi in Paris. Back in Sweden, she was a student of Carl Wilhelmson at the Valand Academy in Gothenburg. In 1906, together with Tora Vega Holmström, she embarked on a series of trips to Stuttgart where she was a pupil of Adolf Hölzel until 1912. There she adopted Hölzel's decision to adopt a 12-colour palette. She completed her education with one more trip to Paris to develop her skills in still lifes.

Wieslander first presented works in Stockholm at a group exhibition of the Swedish Artists Association (Svenska Konstnärernas Förening) in 1902. Thereafter, she participated in a number of other group exhibitions in Sweden. In the later 1910s, she painted snowy landscapes in Västerbotten and went on to paint a number of detailed interiors, revealing the furnishings and textiles of the period. In contrast to her lighter landscapes, her still lifes notable for their bright colours as can be seen in her Stilleben med apelsiner (Still Life with Oranges, 1909). During the 1920s, she increasingly suffered from poor health, forcing her to give up painting.

Agnes Wieslander died at her home in Hjärnarp on 1 December 1934.
