= Ninnan Santesson =

Swedish sculptor, artist (1891–1969)

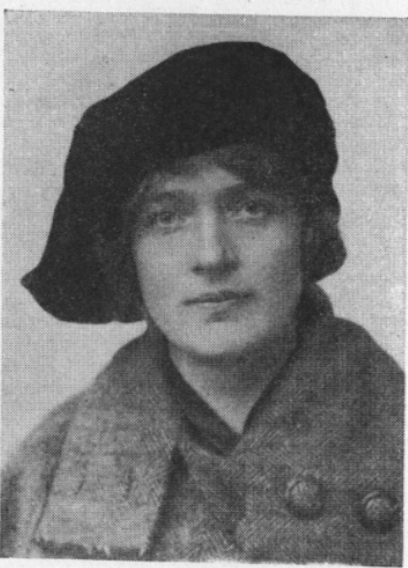
- Ninnan Santesson
- Born: Gertrud Paulina Santesson; 14 December 1891; Fjärås, Sweden
- Died: 14 January 1969 (aged 77); Stockholm, Sweden
- Education: Royal Swedish Academy of Fine Arts
- Occupations: Artist; sculptor
- Spouse: Engelbert Bertel-Nordström
- Relatives: Lena Santesson-Carlson (daughter)

Gertrud Paulina Santesson (14 December 1891 – 14 January 1969) was a Swedish artist and sculptor. Santesson's monumental sculptures and intimate portraits of her contemporaneous women artists are regarded as her greatest creative triumphs.

== Life ==
Born in Fjärås, Sweden, Ninnan Santesson was the second of the three daughters to Berndt Ehrenfried Santesson and his wife Edith Elisabet (née Bergman). Growing up at the Mälby estate in Södermanland, her father died when she was twelve years old. The family moved to Stockholm, where she received her first lessons in sculpture from her mother's friend Sigrid Blomberg. While in Stockholm, Santesson was a student of the Royal Swedish Academy of Fine Arts, but later left to complete her education in Paris. She studied painting at the Académie Colarossi art school, and sculpture at the Académie de la Grande Chaumière. She became close friends with Siri Derkert, Anna Petrus-Lyttkens, and Lisa Bergstrand. During this time, she travelled to Algeria for a year and half, and her travel was instrumental in her stylistic developments. While in Algeria, she painted a portrait entitled Mr Iffa, which was later exhibited beside the work of the Finnish artist Engelbert Bertel-Nordström at the Konstnärshuset in Stockholm. Santesson married Bertel-Nordströmat in 1917.

Santesson worked on most of her monumental sculptures before 1930, and most of these have been associated with the city of Gothenburg. She accepted commission for her first large-scale work in the city, which was to renovate the house of Consul Forsberg in Lorensberg. In 1912, she decorated the Masthugg Church, which is widely regarded as an example of Santesson's finest work. Four years later, she designed a sculpture of Swedish marshal Erik Dahlberg. The figure was cast in granite for the memorial. The same year, she completed a sculpture entitled Genius på högt postament, a statue of poet Viktor Rydberg, which she saw raised as a public monument 10 years later. The sculpture was designed in the classical style, and she depicted the poet's dual nature through it. Her 1930 work, Kunskapens träd in Skövde, was also designed in the same style.

From 1930, Santesson stopped working on monumental sculptures and turned her attention to small-scale clay, terracotta, and bronze models. During this time, she painted portraits of her friends who were well-known contemporaneous artists, including Naima Wifstrand, Marianne Frestadius, and Hanna Rydh. Her studio became a meeting place of for her old friends, where Berta Hansson worked on the sketches, Siri Derkert was in charge of the sculptors, and Maj Bring served as a model. Santesson's full-body sculpture of Bring is often regarded as a masterpiece. In a review, Swedish art critic Ulf Linde said, "Ninnan Santesson's sculptures and drawings have an incredible vibrato on all of the form's surfaces. [...] She reveals the sensitive nature of things in the utmost sense of the word. It is never banal." Flicka med hund, her final work was designed in free-style. The model was raised at Mälarhöjden posthumously.

Santensson has held several solo exhibitions in Stockholm, Gothenburg, Uppsala, Lund, and Borås. Her works have appeared in many significant exhibitions including the Nordic Art Exhibition at Gothenburg and the Optimists at Liljevalchs, and those organised by the Swedish General Art Association. The most notable collections of her artwork are at the National Museum of Fine Arts, the Moderna Museet, and the Gothenburg Museum of Art.

Santesson died in Stockholm, on 14 January 1969.
