= Ellen Trotzig =

Swedish artist

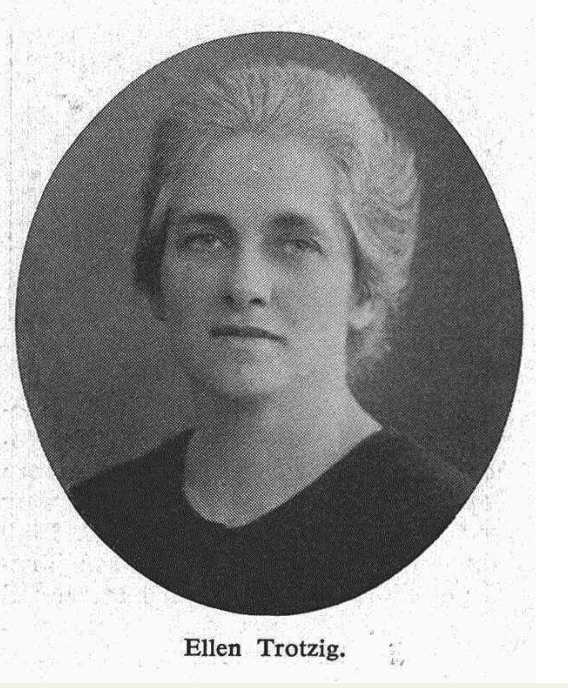
- Born: 5 March 1878; Malmö
- Died: 6 November 1949 (aged 71); Simrishamn
- Known for: Painting

Ellen Trotzig (5 March 1878 – 6 November 1949) was a Swedish artist who based herself in Österlen and became known as the "first female painter of Österlen".

== Life ==
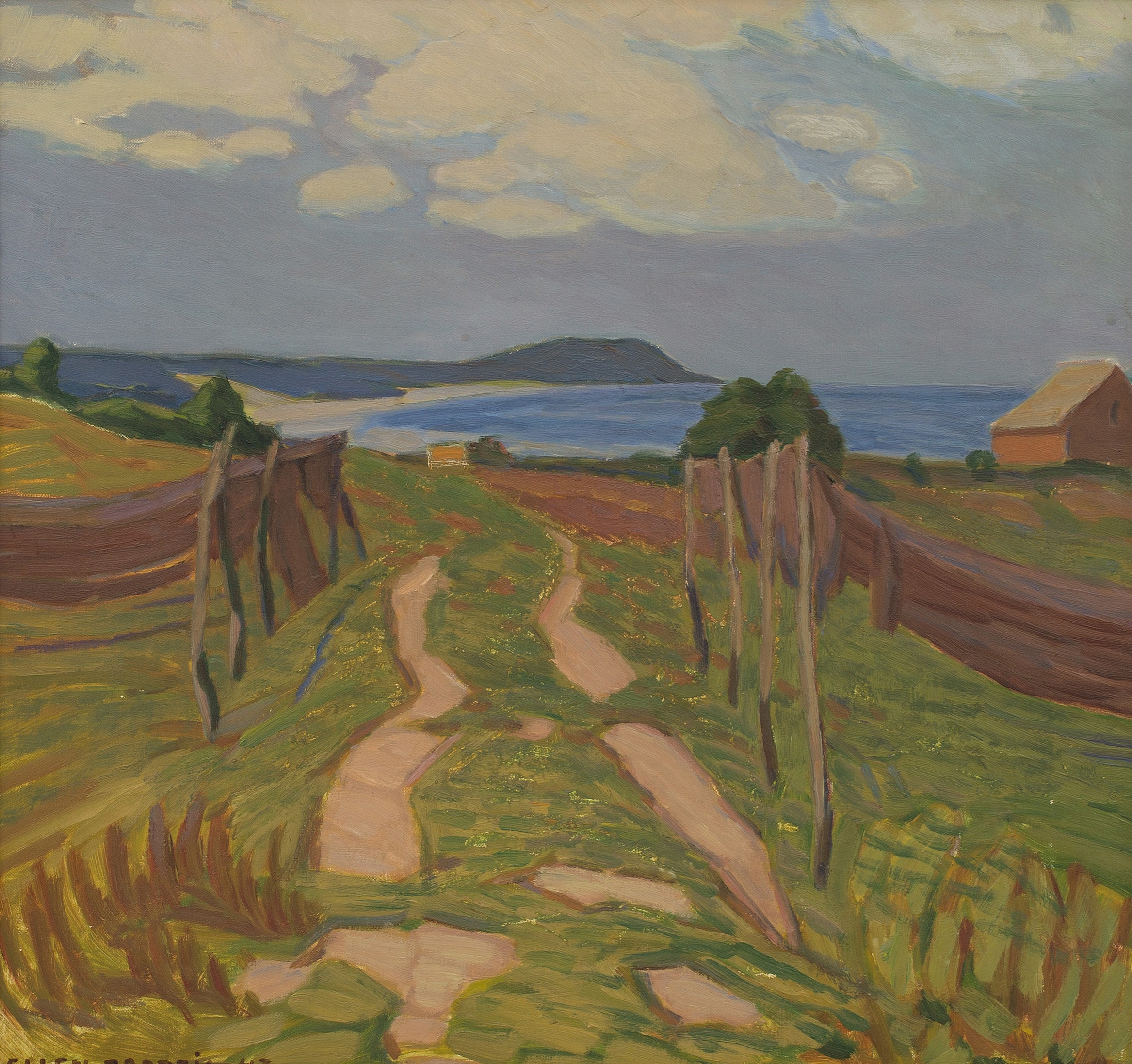
from 1943

Trotzig was born in Malmö in 1878. She and her family moved to Simrishamn when she was five and they stayed there until her father, Johan Wilhelm Trotzig, died and her widowed mother, Christina Cecilia Trotzig, lead the family back to Malmo. She was eighteen when her father died, luckily his brother, Fredrik, appreciated her talent and supported her education. She gained her education at the Tegne- og Kunstindustriskolen for Kvinder, the Valand School of Fine Arts in Gotheborg and with Christian Krohg at the Académie Colarossi in Paris. In Paris she joined other Scandinavians including fellow painter Tora Vega Holmström. In 1908 she gained confidence in her talent when she sold a 1906 portrait to Gothenburg Art Museum.

She realised that she preferred nature to people and she returned to Sweden she decided to move to the east of the country as she preferred the light and the rugged landscape. Others would eventually follow her lead, but for now she was becoming "the first painter in the East", a title that would be associated with her She took an interest in flowers and she painted portraits including that of Martha Lyzell in 1914 and in time they would live together in her childhood home town of Simrishamn. She would also paint quite dark landscapes dominated by blue, brown and green.

When she died at her home in Simrishamn in 1949 she left instructions that her paintings should be sold in order that a charity could be established. The money is used to support young artists.
