= Maj Bring =

Swedish painter and model

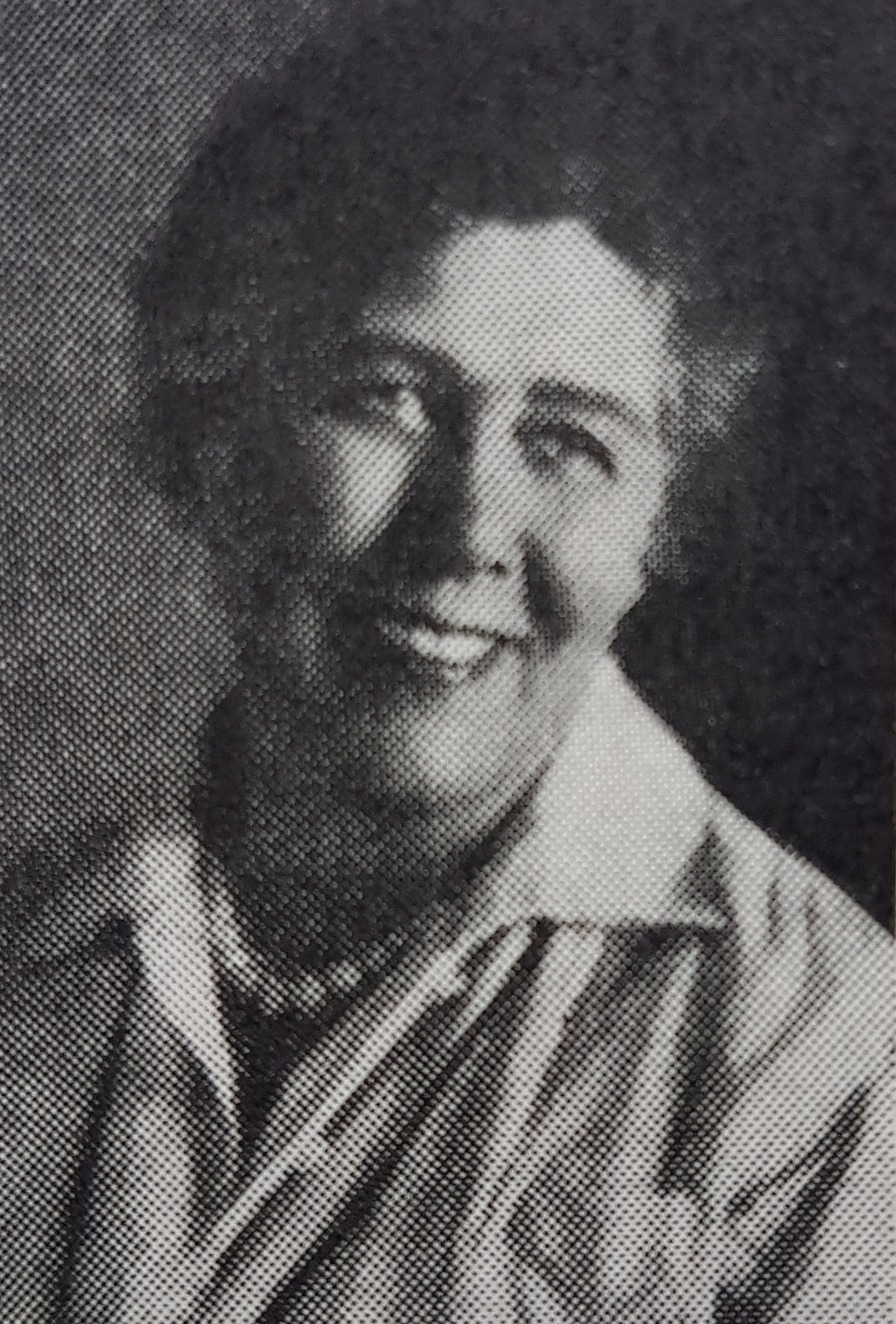
A portrait of Maj Bring

Ebba Maria Bring, better known as Maj (29 August 1880 in Uppsala – 5 December 1971 in Stockholm) was a Swedish painter and model. She was the daughter of Sven Casper Bring.

Bring was educated at the Royal Swedish Academy of Fine Arts in Stockholm, and she's represented in the collection of the Moderna Museet there with eleven works, seven paintings and four drawings. Her portrait of Anna Behle is in the portrait collection of Gripsholm Castle. She is the subject of several portraits in the Nationalmuseum collection, by Maja Braathen, Berta Hansson, Ninnan Santesson, and Carl Wilhelmson; the museum also owns her portrait of Johan Ramstedt.

Artistically, her style was defined by contact with Henri Matisse, with whom she studied in Paris in 1910. She continued to exhibit until she was nearly 90.
