= Vera Nilsson =

Swedish painter (1888–1979)

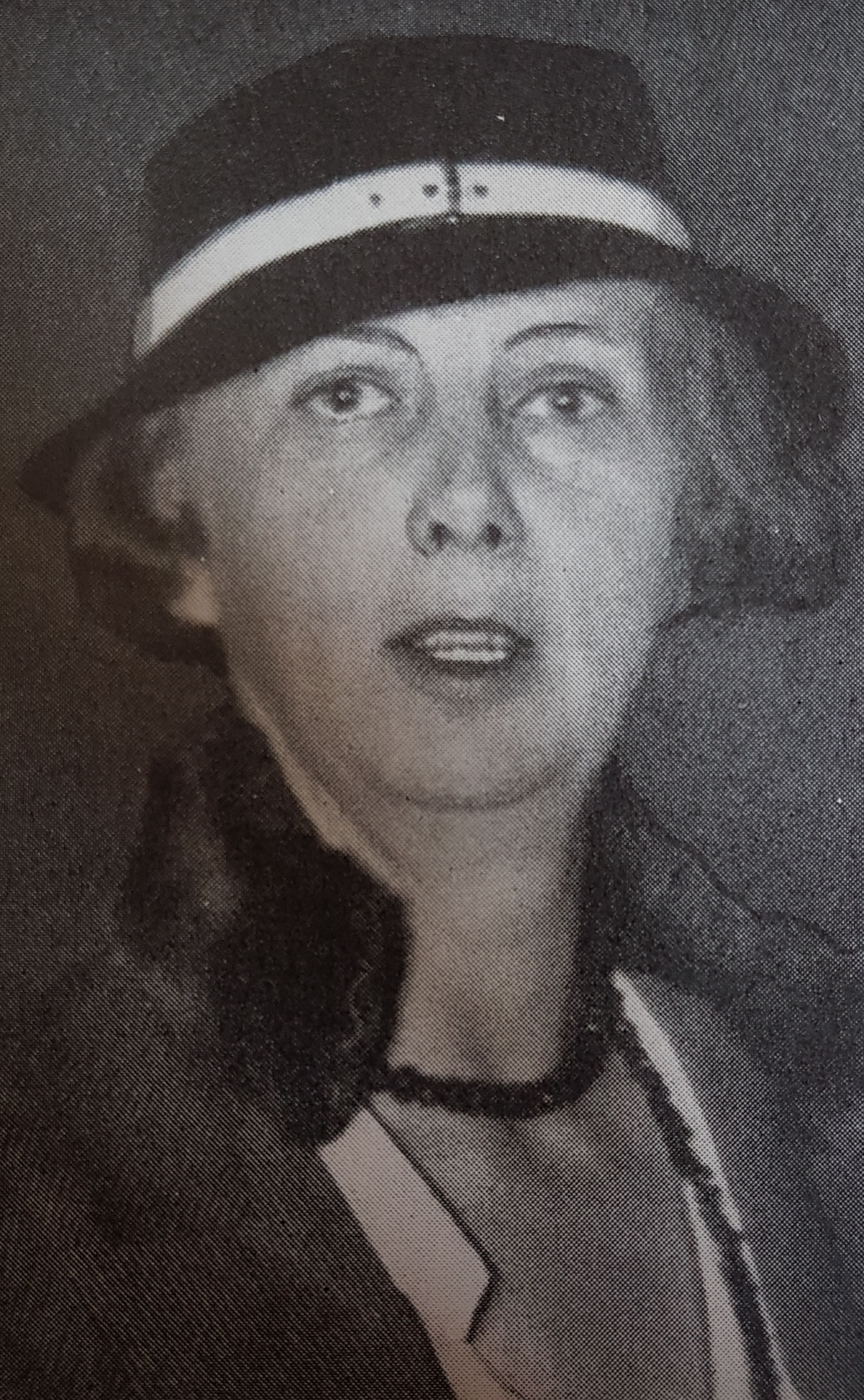
Vera Nilsson

Vera Amalia Märta Nilsson (1888–1979) was a Swedish painter and a peace activist. One of Sweden's most prominent Expressionists, she is remembered in particular for her paintings of children, including her daughter Ginga, and for her landscapes, often scenes of Öland where she spent her summers. Her anti-war sentiments are vividly expressed in Penning conta liv, painted during the Spanish Civil War in 1939. In the 1960s, she painted works protesting nuclear war. Her work is represented in museums and galleries in Sweden and abroad, including Nationalmuseet and Moderna Museet in Stockholm.

== Early life and education ==
Born in Jönköping on 1 June 1888, Vera Amalia Märta Nilsson was the daughter of the bailiff Karl Albert Nilsson and his wife Anna Dorothea Amalia (Ada) née Sjögren. She was the youngest of the family's four children. Brought up in a well-to-do home, her father arranged for her to have private drawing lessons while she was at school. As a result, from 1906 to 1909 she was able to attend the drawing teachers' programme at Stockholm's Technical School. After she received her teaching diploma, her father agreed that rather than becoming a teacher, she could study art at Gothenburg's Valand Art School (1909–10) where her instructor was Carl Wilhelmson. In 1910, she studied in Paris under the Cubist Henri Le Fauconnier at the Académie de La Palette and at the city's Russian art colleges. In 1912, while visiting the 1912 Sonderbud Exhibition in Cologne, she was profoundly taken by Vincent van Gogh's Expressionist paintings.

== Career ==
During the First World War, along with other Swedes, Nilsson moved to Copenhagen where conditions were better but returned to Öland for the summers. There she painted Copenhagen streets and parks as well as portraits, including one of her friend and art teacher Astrid Holm. Together with the Swede Mollie Faustman, in 1917 she exhibited her Cubist works in an exhibition at the Ovenlyssal, receiving encouraging critical support. In 1918, she presented her work for the first time in Sweden at the Young Swedish Artists exhibition at Stockholm's Liljevalch's Gallery. Her landscapes of Öland with their bold colours and shapes attracted considerable interest from the critics who welcomed her Expressionist flair.

While visiting Spain in 1919, Nilsson was strongly impressed by El Greco's works in Toledo. In Málaga, she painted various versions of Gata i Málaga depicting poor girls dancing in the street. Under the influence of the Spanish civil war in 1938, she painted the monumental Penning contra liv (Money Versus Life), revealing her anti-war feelings. It was exhibited the following year at the Royal Academy of Art and in Gothenburg.

Following the birth of her daughter Catharina (Ginga) in 1922, she emabarked on a longer series of paintings of the child until she became a teenager. Thanks to a scholarship, in 1927 she visited Italy where her works På terrassen and Såpbubblor featured her daughter. Many of her pictures included children, some criticized for their ugliness. In the 1930s, painting many intensely coloured summer landscapes in Värmland. In the 1940s, she settled into a permanent home in the Söder district of Stockholm where she produced several works titled Gubbhuset depicting scenes from her window. She visited Senegal in 1949, sketching and painting in pastels.

While in Paris after the Second World War, Nilsson became actively engaged in the anti-war movement, selling Citoyen du monde on the streets. In the 1960s, she produced several paintings inspired by the threat of nuclear war, while one titled Tröst (Comfort) was more hopeful. Her 1979 work Fredskortet (Peace Card) showed women with outstretched arms calling for an end to the arms race. It was Nilsson's last artwork.

Vera Nilsson died in Stockholm on 13 May 1979.

== Awards ==
In 1948, Nilsson was awarded the Prince Eugen Medal for outstanding artistic achievement.
