= Engelbert Bertel-Nordström =

Swedish painter

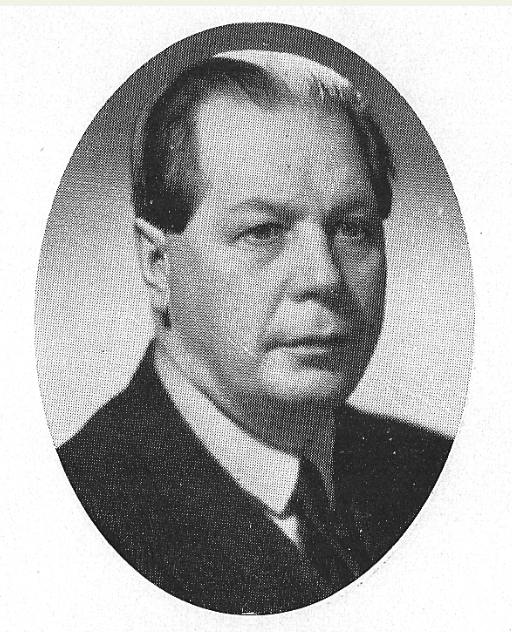
- Born: 19 April 1884; Helsinki, Finland
- Died: 22 August 1967 (aged 83); Stockholm, Sweden
- Occupation: Painter

Engelbert Bertel-Nordström (19 April 1884 – 22 August 1967) was a Swedish painter. His work was part of the painting event in the art competition at the 1936 Summer Olympics.

Born in Finland, Bertel-Nordström moved to Sweden in 1914. He married the artist and sculptor Ninnan Santesson there in 1917.
