= Anna Behle =

Swedish dancer and teacher of rhythmic gymnastics and solfège

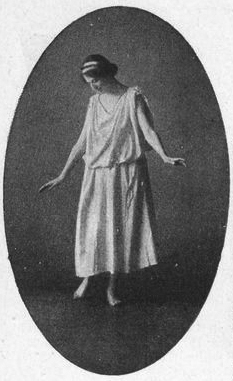
- Anna Behle. Photo from Hvar 8 Dag, 1907.
- Born: 9 August 1876; Stockholm, Sweden
- Died: 2 October 1966 (aged 90); Stockholm, Sweden
- Education: Royal Swedish College of Music; Dalcroze Institute
- Occupation(s): Dancer, teacher of gymnastics and solfège

Anna Charlotta Behle (9 August 1876 – 2 October 1966) was a Swedish dancer and teacher of rhythmic gymnastics and solfège.

== Biography ==
Behle was born in Stockholm in 1876 to unwed parents, and was adopted, along with her brother August, by the Granbäck family, who ensured that she had a full education. She received her degree as an organist from composer Albert Lindström in 1896. In 1898 she enrolled at the Royal College of Music in Stockholm, where she took courses in solo singing for five semesters and then spent time in France, where she changed her surname from Granbäck to Behle.

Considered a pioneer of modern dance in Sweden, she first became interested in the art after watching Isadora Duncan perform. Back in Sweden, on 1 May 1906, she went with a friend, Louise Wikström, to the Östermalm Theatre on Karlavägen in Stockholm to see guest Isadora Duncan. They sought out the dancer and were invited to her school outside Berlin in what is now the Grunewald quarter.

After initial studies in singing with Eugène Crosti and Emile Wartel in Paris, she studied dance with Duncan and with Emile Jacques-Dalcroze in Geneva, later graduating from the Dalcroze Institute near Dresden in 1911.

Combining Duncan's artistry with Dalcroze's pedagogy and technique (La metode), Behle's own version of free dance was formed. After returning to Geneva in 1907 for another summer course, the two friends set up Sweden's first Duncan school of plastic and rhythmic gymnastics in a four-room apartment at Brahegatan 45 in Stockholm. Her students included dancer Gabo Falk and writer Anna Sparre.

In 1909, Behle became a member of Nya Idun, a Swedish women's association.

Behle died in Stockholm in 1966. A portrait of Behle by Maj Bring, painted in 1906, is part of the collection of portraits at Gripsholm Castle.
