= Tora Vega Holmström =

Swedish painter

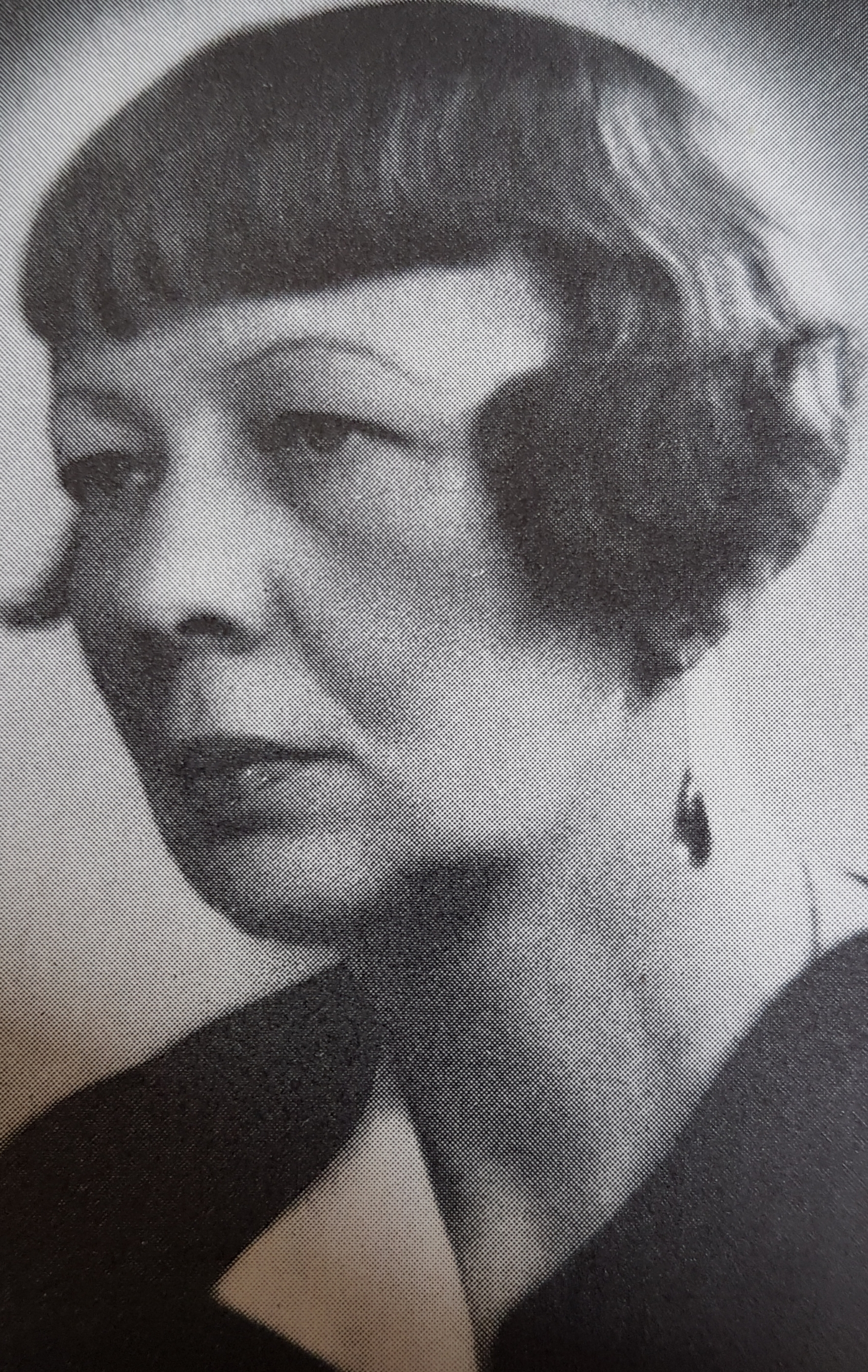
- Born: Anna Tora Vega Elisabeth Holmström; 2 March 1880; Tottarp, Sweden
- Died: 28 January 1967 (aged 86); Lund, Sweden
- Family: Malin Holmström-Ingers (mother); Carl Torsten Holmström (father)

Tora Vega Holmström (2 March 1880, Tottarp, Scania – 28 January 1967, Lund) was a Swedish painter.

== Early life and education ==
Anna Tora Vega Elisabeth Holmström grew up with five siblings at Hvilan Community College in Åkarp, run by her parents. In what was Sweden's first community college, the young woman found an intellectually dynamic environment conducive to societal debates.

From 1900 to 1902, Holmström studied at the Valand Academy in Gothenburg. She was admitted there thanks to her sister, who sent Holmström's drawings to Carl Wilhelmson, artist and director of the school of painting. Although aware of Holmström's talent, Wilhelmson replied in his letter:— "[...] however, she has one thing against her: her sex. Because a woman can never become an artist to be encouraged and God preserve us for those we already have."

== Career ==
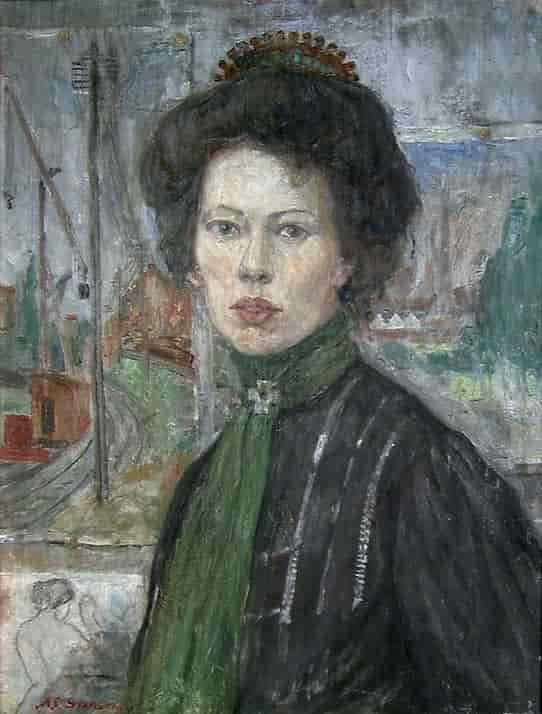
Portrait of the Swedish Painter Tora Holmström (1907), by Anders Svarstad

Holmström made several trips to France, Finland, England, the Netherlands, Belgium, and Algeria. At the Old Port of Marseille, she met one of her favorite models, a woman named Cathérine. During Holmström's studies, she became friends with two other Swedish artists, Adelheid von Schmiterlöw and Hanna Borrie. Under the group name "Trois Mousquetaires", they created a network of women artists, and organized an extended trip to Paris in 1907. Holmström worked particularly with Ester Almqvist, Ellen Trotzig, and abroad with María Blanchard.

Holmström is known for painting portraits, still lifes and landscapes of Scania. In the 1910s, Holmström discovered the motif of the Scanian peasant woman, which became central to her work. The original model was her brother's mother-in-law, who stands out for her proud attitude. Holmström mainly worked in oil paint and pastel. In her early days, her painting was influenced by romantic nationalism, then by the early 20th century, modernism with cubist, expressive and sometimes surrealist[strokes. Her meeting with the color theorist Adolf Hölzel, in Dachau, is decisive in her scientific conception of color and contrasts.

In 1914, Holmström presented a dozen works at the Baltic Exhibition in Malmö. The vigor of her style and the audacity of her colors aroused critics, who considered them brutal and "insufficiently feminine".

Through the initiative of Hanna Larsdotter, who invited artists and writers to her castle, Holmström met Rainer Maria Rilke. Their epistolary correspondence lasted several years, with Rilke's 28 letters bearing witness to short meetings and discussions around Goethe and color theory. Holmström never married or had children, which gave her the status of a professional artist all her life.

== Selected works ==
- Étrangers, 1913–14, Moderna Museet
- Le cavalier, 1921, Moderna Museet
- María Blanchard, 1921, Moderna Museet
- Madone espagnole, 1931, Moderna Museet
- Cilia, la tisserande, 1937, Moderna Museet
