= Carl Wilhelmson =

Swedish painter, graphic artist, amateur photographer and art teacher

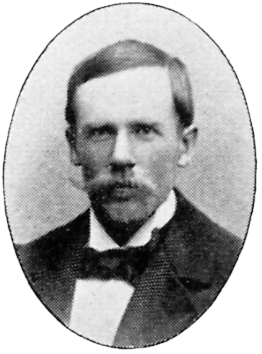
Carl Wilhelmson, from the Svenskt Porträttgalleri XX.

Carl Wilhelm Wilhelmson (12 November 1866, Fiskebäckskil – 24 September 1928, Gothenburg) was a Swedish painter, graphic artist, amateur photographer and art teacher.

== Biography ==
His father, Anders Wilhelmson, was a "Bästeman" (a type of Naval Master), who died in a shipwreck in 1875. His mother, Amalia, opened a small shop to support the family. Some relatives were in the printing business so, in 1881, he was apprenticed to the lithographers Meyer & Köster in Gothenburg. He also took evening classes at the School of Design and Crafts. He later became a full-time student of Carl Larsson at the Valand Academy.

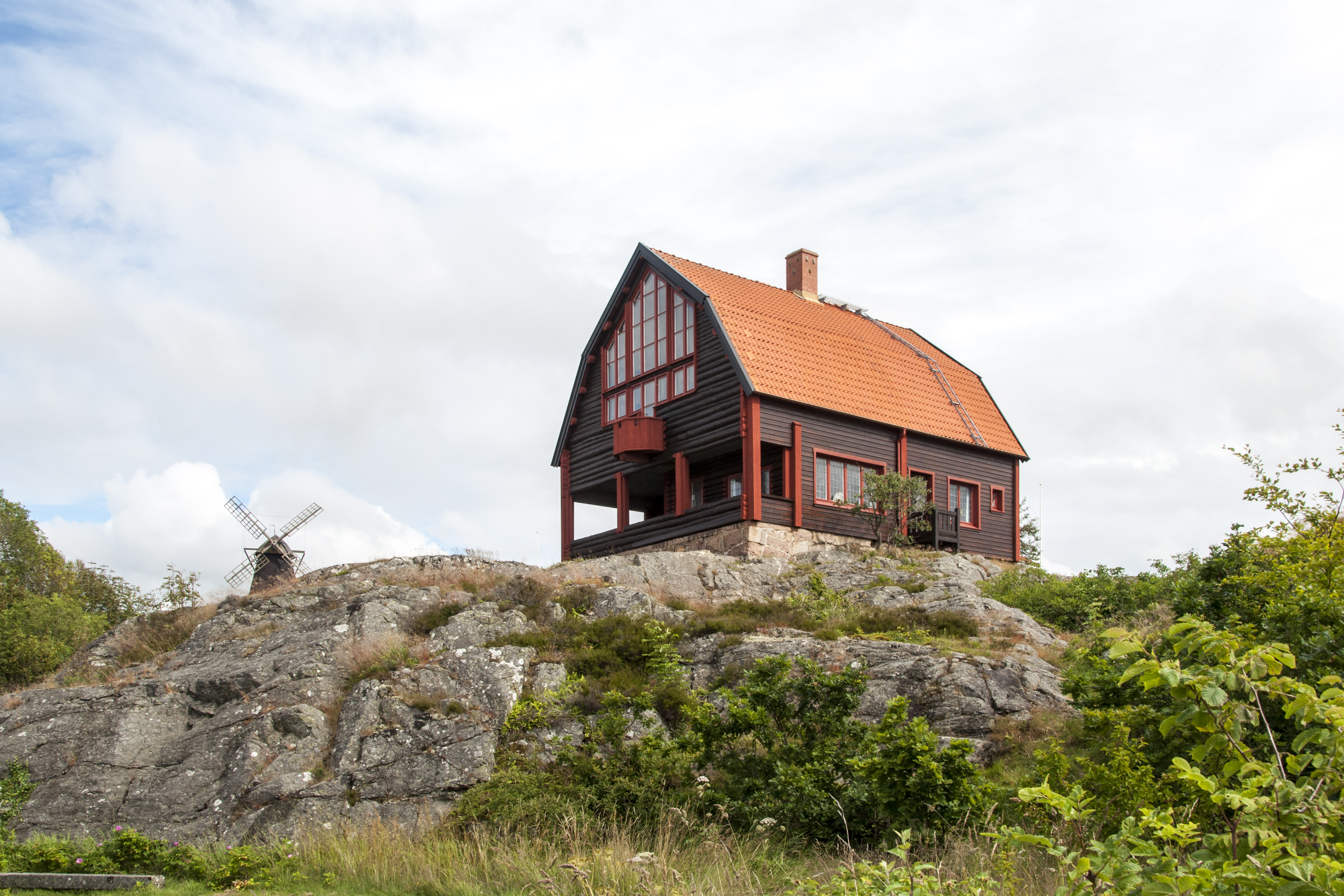
His villa and studio in Fiskebäckskil

In 1888, on the recommendation of Larsson and his former employers, he was awarded a scholarship from the Kommerskollegium that enabled him to travel to Leipzig. While there, he worked for several notable lithography firms. Despite this, he remained undecided as to whether he should pursue a career in lithography or strike out on his own as an artist. By 1890, he had saved enough money to move to Paris.

In Paris, he worked as an advertising artist while taking classes from Paul Sérusier and Maurice Denis at the Académie Julian. He may also have studied, at least briefly, with Jules Lefebvre and Tony Robert-Fleury. In 1893, he visited Brittany and, in 1895, had a small showing at the Salon. He returned to Sweden in 1896.

Upon his return, the art patron, Pontus Fürstenberg, invited him to become the Director at the Valand Academy. He accepted and held that position until 1910. In 1901, he married the painter, Albertina Kerfstedt. One of their children, Ana Wilhelmson-Lagerman, also became a painter. After leaving the Academy, he opened his own art school, where his students included Ivan Aguéli, Evert Taube, Evert Lundquist, Tora Vega Holmström and Maj Bring. At the invitation of his friend, Hjalmar Lundbohm, he made expeditions to Norrland in 1914 and 1918 and produced several well known paintings in Bohuslän. He was appointed a Professor at the Royal Swedish Academy of Fine Arts in 1925 and became a member in 1926, in reverse of the usual order.

In addition to his canvases, he painted murals at the Dicksonska folkbiblioteket and the Central Post Office Building (Stockholm).His works may be seen at the Göteborgs konstmuseum, Nationalmuseum the Thiel Gallery and the Statens Museum for Kunst in Copenhagen.

The passenger ferry that operates between Fiskebäckskil and Lysekil is named after him, as is a street in the Lunden district of Gothenburg.

== Selected paintings ==
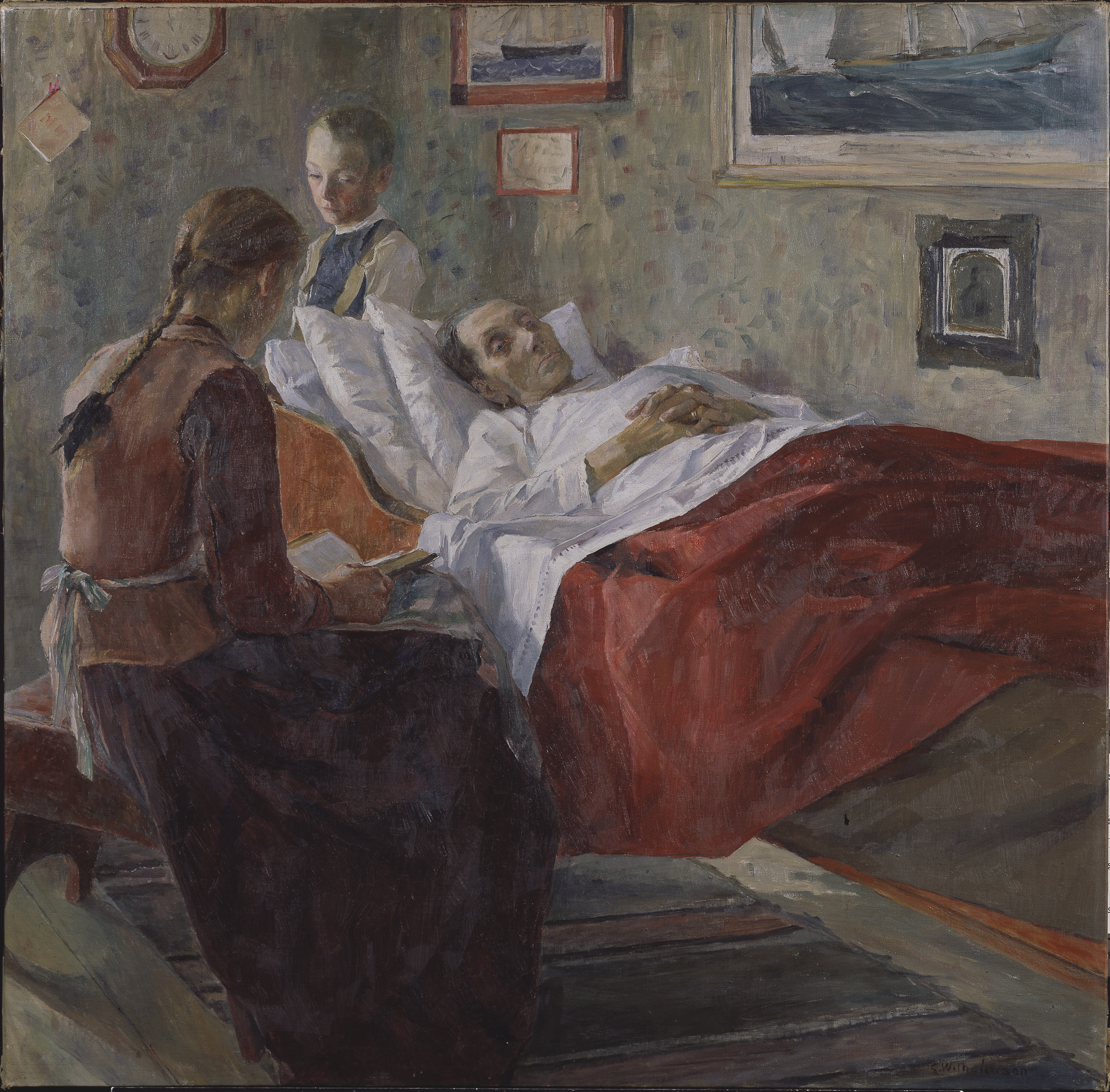
Resignation, 1895 - Stockholm National Museum

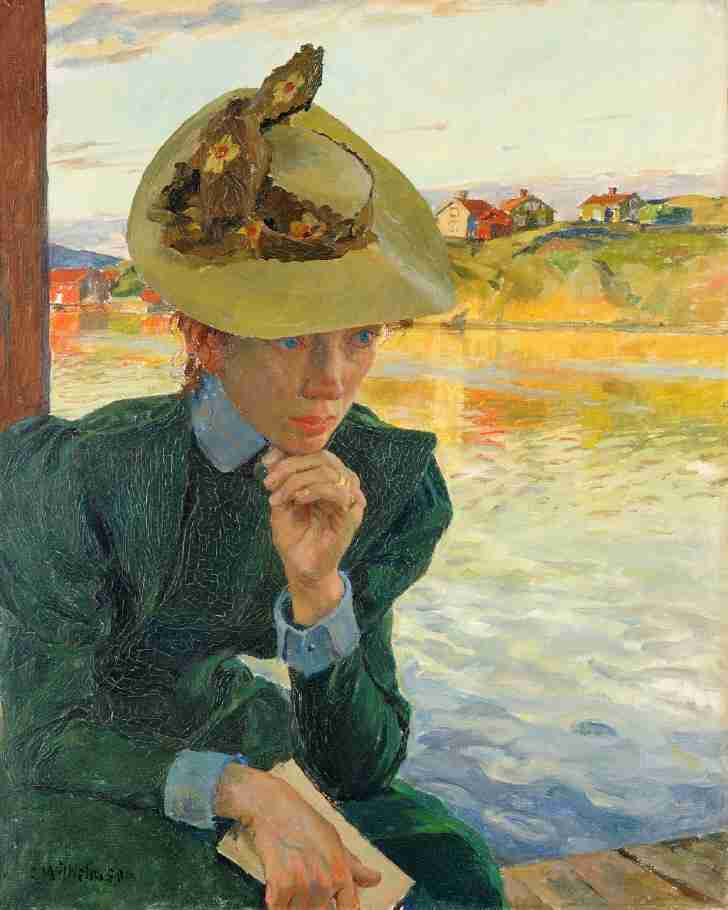
By the West Coast, 1898 - Gothenburg Museum of Art

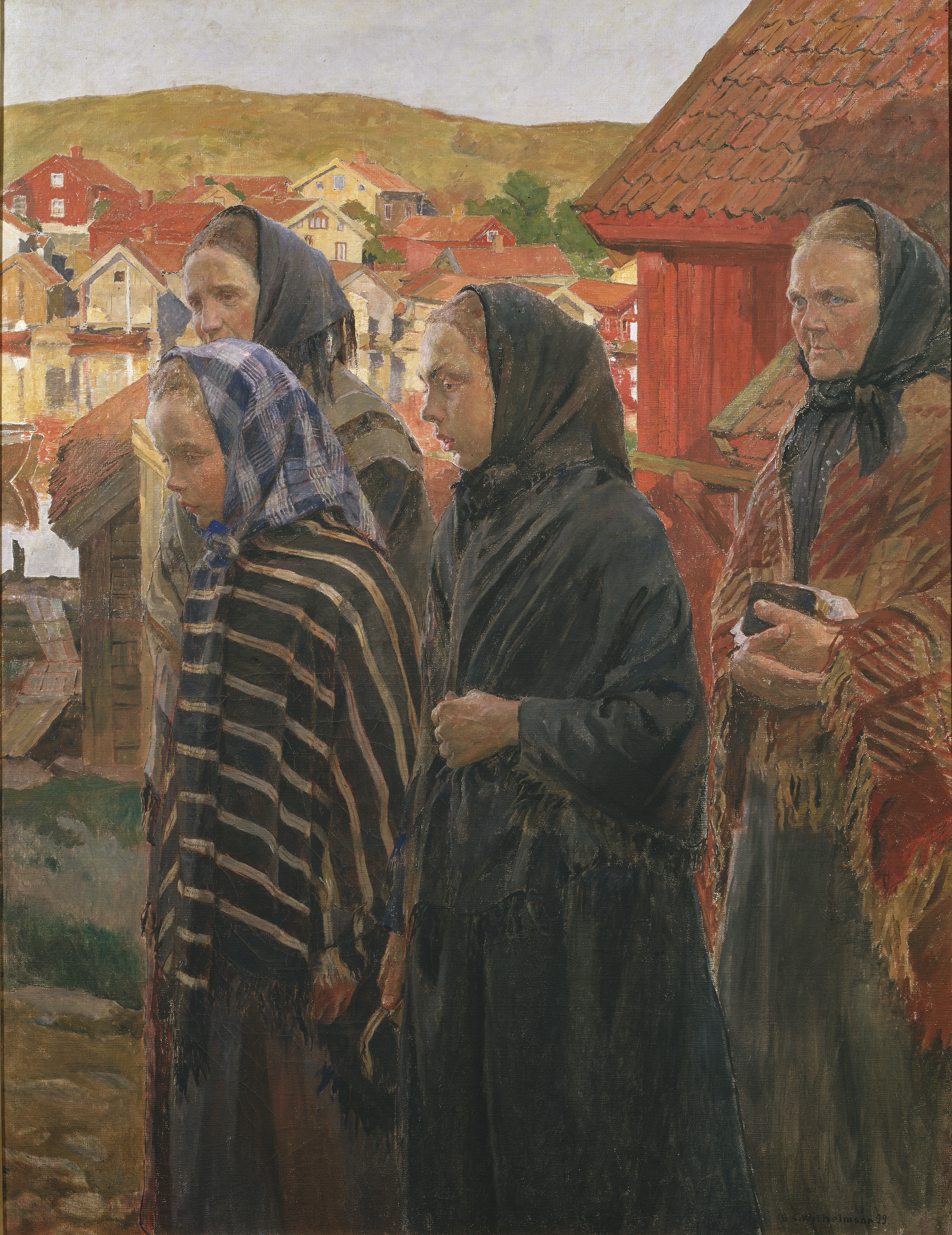
Fishermen's Wives Returning from Church, 1899 - Stockholm National Museum

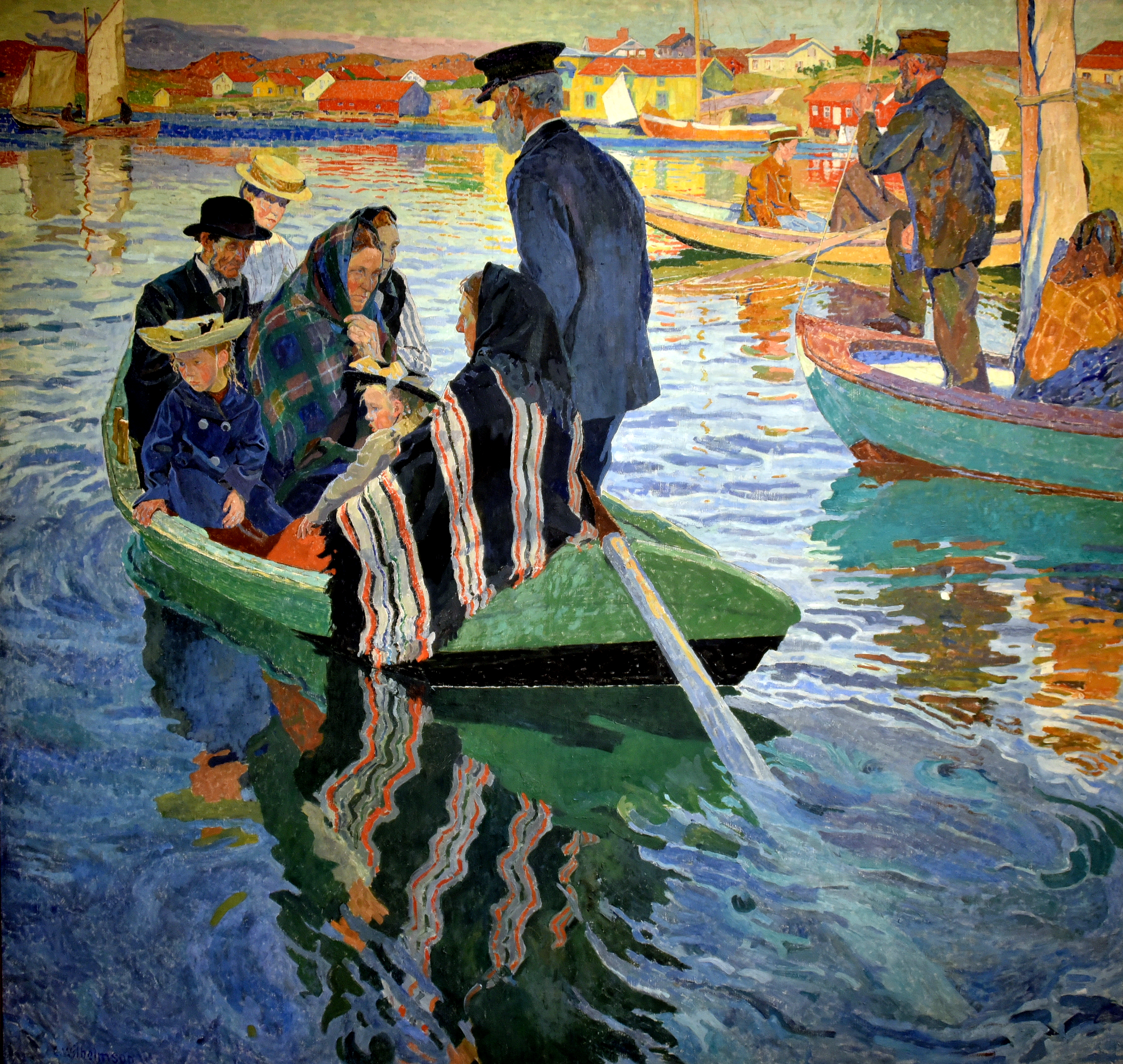
Church-Goers in a boat 1909 - Stockholm National Museum

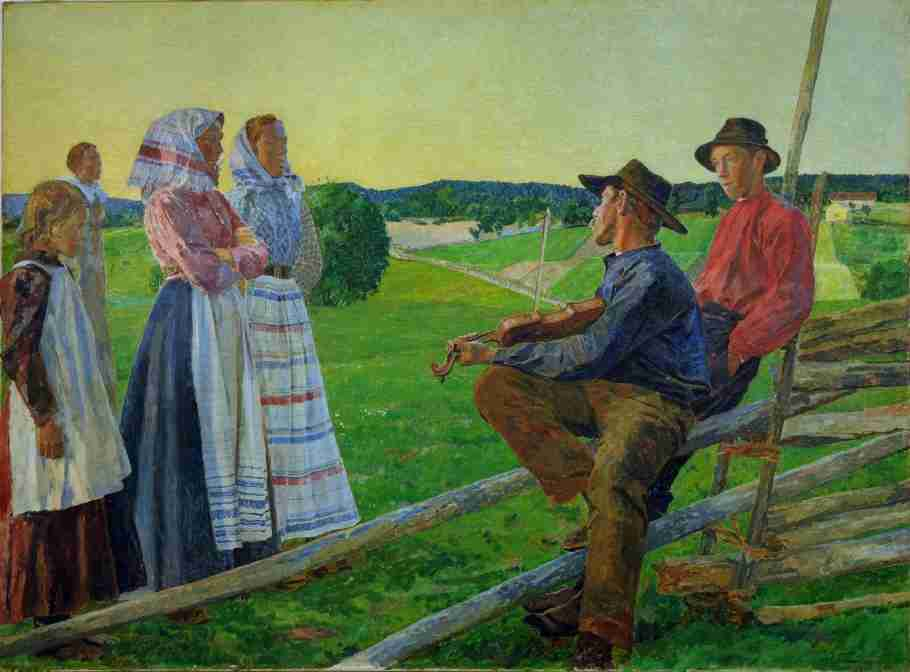
June Evening, 1902 - Gothenburg Museum of Art

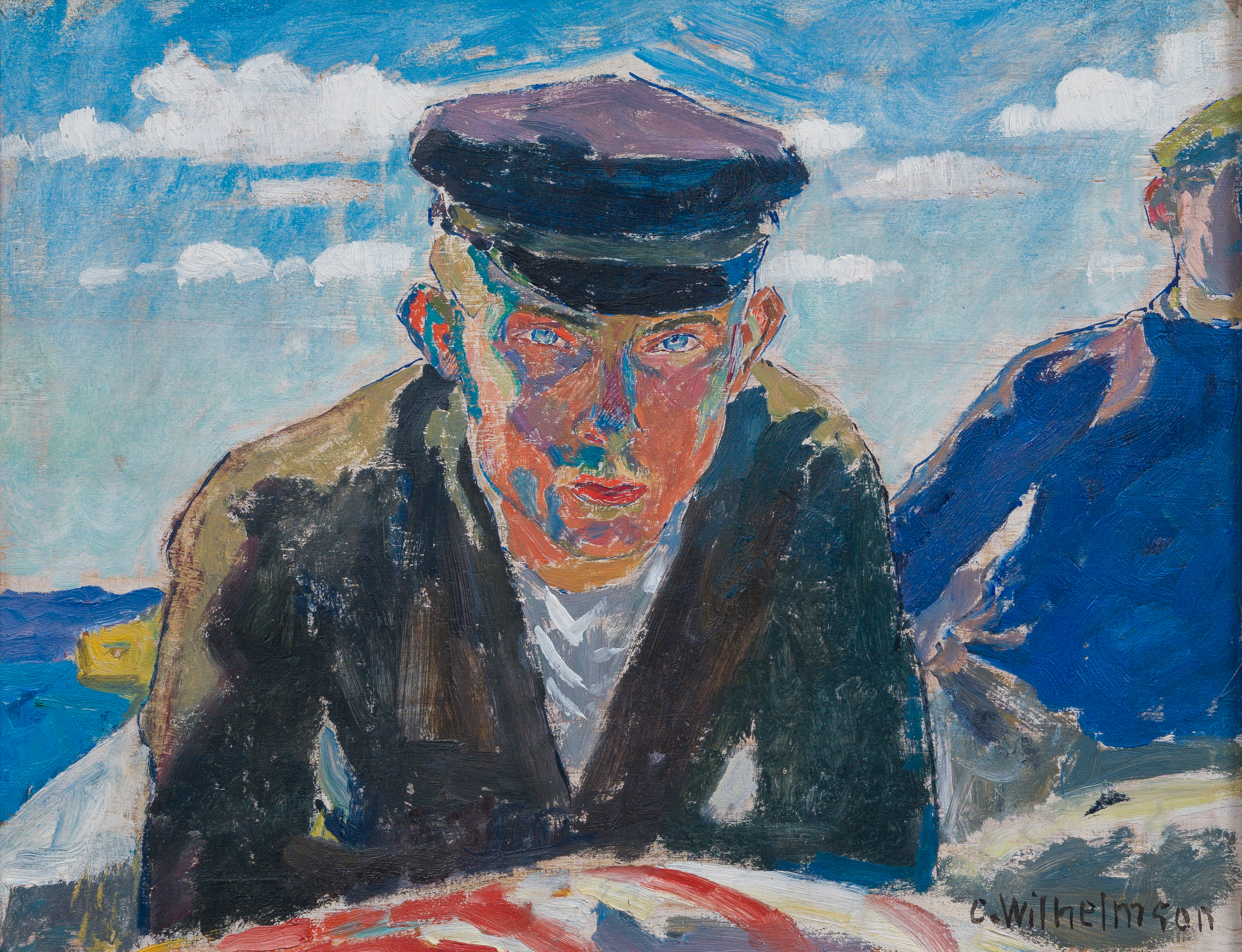
On the Sea (På havet) 1911

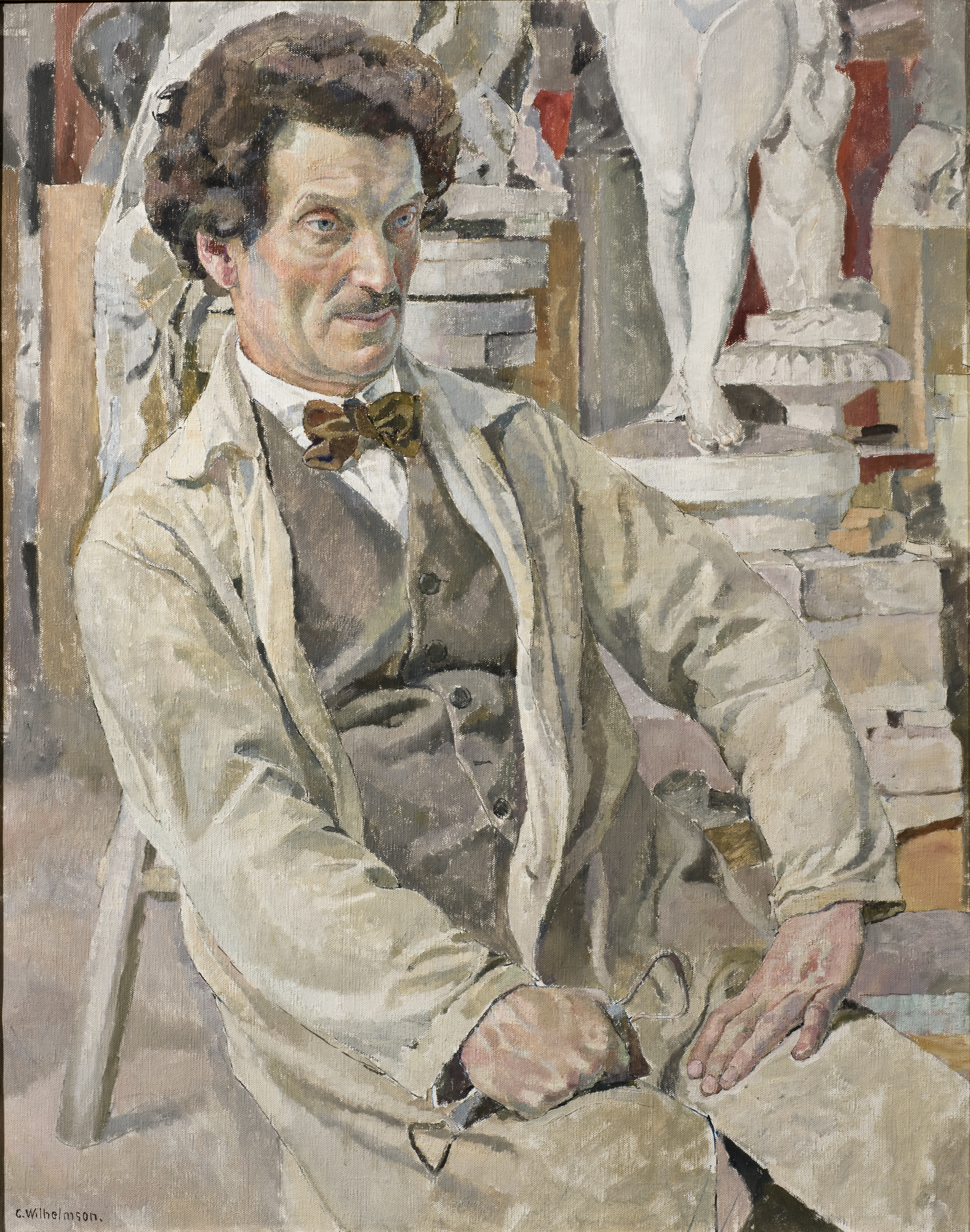
Portrait of Carl Eldh, 1924 - Stochholm National Museum
