= Bark =

Bark most commonly refers to:

- Bark (botany), an outer layer of a woody plant
- Bark (sound), a vocalization of some animals

Bark may refer to:

== Arts and entertainment ==
- Bark (Jefferson Airplane album), 1971
- Bark (Blackie and the Rodeo Kings album)
- Bark (short story collection), a short story collection by Lorrie Moore
- Bark!, a 2002 film written by Heather Morgan
- Bark the Polar Bear, a character in the Sonic the Hedgehog series

== Food ==
- Almond bark, a confection
- Peppermint bark, a confection

== Places ==
- Bark, Germany, a municipality
- Bark, Warmian-Masurian Voivodeship, Poland, a village

=== Canada ===
- Bark Lake, Nipissing District, Ontario
- Bark Lake, Assad Township, Algoma District, Ontario
- Bark Lake, Barnes Township, Algoma District, Ontario
- Bark Lake, Haliburton County, Ontario
- Bark Lake, Keikewabik Lake, Kenora District, Ontario
- Bark Lake, Lumby Creek, Kenora District, Ontario
- Bark Lake, Sudbury District, Ontario

=== United States ===
- Bark River (Michigan)
- Bark River (Rock River), a tributary of the Rock River
- Bark River (Lake Superior), Wisconsin, a tributary of Lake Superior

== People ==
- Adam Bark (born 2000), Swedish footballer
- Ernesto Bark (1858–1922), Livonian journalist and political activist, exiled in Spain
- Jane Bark (1931–2023), Swedish illustrator
- Pyotr Bark (1869–1937), Russian government official and banker, Russian Empire Minister of Finance

== Other uses ==
- Barque, bark, or barc, a type of sailing ship
- BARK (computer), an early Swedish electromechanical computer
- BARK (organization), an American environmentalist organization
- Bark!, a magazine published by Canada Wide Media
- Bark scale, an auditory frequency metric
- Bark.com, web-based services marketplace based in London
- Barker (occupation), a person who attempts to attract patrons to entertainment events
- Beta adrenergic receptor kinase (βARK), an intracellular enzyme

== See also ==
- Barking (disambiguation)
- Barks (disambiguation)
- Berk (disambiguation)
- Barq
