= List of Holiday Baking Championship episodes =

This is a list of episodes for the Food Network cooking competition series Holiday Baking Championship. The series has been presented by Bobby Deen (seasons 1–3) and Jesse Palmer (seasons 4+) and judged by Nancy Fuller (seasons 1-12), Duff Goldman (seasons 1+), Lorraine Pascale (seasons 1–6), Carla Hall (seasons 7-11), Kardea Brown (season 12+), and Molly Yeh (season 13).

== Series overview ==
Season	Episodes	Season premiere	Season finale
1	6	November 9, 2014	December 14, 2014
2	8	November 1, 2015	December 20, 2015
3	8	November 6, 2016	December 25, 2016
4	7	November 6, 2017	December 18, 2017
5	7	November 5, 2018	December 17, 2018
6	8	November 4, 2019	December 23, 2019
7	8	November 2, 2020	December 21, 2020
8	8	November 1, 2021	December 20, 2021
9	8	November 7, 2022	December 19, 2022
10	8	November 6, 2023	December 18, 2023
11	8	November 4, 2024	December 16, 2024
12	8	November 3, 2025	December 22, 2025
13		November 2, 2026	

== Season 1 ==
There were 8 professional and home bakers competing in a 6-episode baking tournament. One person was eliminated every week until the final episode where the final three compete in a single, all-day round for the grand prize of $50,000.

=== Contestants ===
- 1st – Erin Campbell, Baker and Manager from Palmdale, California
- 2nd/3rd – Bill Lipscomb, Culinary Instructor from Atlanta, Georgia
- 2nd/3rd – Naylet Larochelle, Home Baker & Psychologist from Miami, Florida
- 4th – Terra Nelson, Culinary Instructor from Louisville, Kentucky
- 5th – David Bondarchuck, Caterer from Denver, Colorado
- 6th – Dante Marasco, U.S. Navy Cook from Annapolis, Maryland
- 7th – Punky Egan, Certified Master Baker from Madison, Wisconsin
- 8th – Stephanie Hart, Bakery Owner from Chicago, Illinois

=== Episodes ===
Ep. #	Title	Original Air Date
1	"Cookie Madness"	November 9, 2014
	Preliminary Heat: Make holiday cookies in 1 hour. Each contestant picked a gift-wrapped box and had to make a certain type of cookie depending on the tool found inside. (Cookie press = spritz cookie, rolling pin = rolled cookie, ice cream scoop = drop cookie, & spatula = layered cookie). Winner: Erin Campbell (Her advantage was being able to substitute a flavor profile in the second round.) Main Heat: The contestants must bake a dozen cookies incorporating bittersweet chocolate, a dozen cookies incorporating fresh oranges, and a dozen cookies incorporating toffee bits, all in 90 minutes. Erin used her pre-heat advantage to replace fresh oranges with peppermint. Mid-round twist is for everyone to add raspberry jam into one batch of their cookies. Winner: Naylet Larochelle Eliminated: Stephanie Hart	
2	"Classic Holiday Flavors"	November 16, 2014
	Preliminary Heat: Make an eggnog swirled treat in 1 hour. Winner: Terra Nelson (Her advantage was exclusive use of a spice grinder in the second round.) Main Heat: The contestants have 1 hour to make a dessert featuring at least 3 classic holiday spices and 2 different kinds of sugar. All except for Terra had to grind their spices by hand. Winner: Bill Lipscomb Eliminated: Punky Egan	
3	"It's Not the Holidays Without Pie"	November 23, 2014
	Preliminary Heat: Create any dessert, except for pie, with a ready-made pie crust in 30 minutes. Winner: Erin Campbell (Her advantage is a 10-minute head start in the second round.) Main Heat: The contestants have 2 hours to make 3 different pies that are inspired by home memories and traditions. End-of-the-round twist is having the contestants choose only their 2 best pies to present to the judges. Winner: David Bondarchuck Eliminated: Dante Marasco	
4	"The Great Holiday Cake-Over"	November 30, 2014
	Preliminary Heat: Each contestant got a wrapped package with a fruitcake inside. They had 45 minutes to reinvent their holiday fruitcake into a different dessert. Winner: Erin Campbell (Her advantage is 10 minutes of help from Duff Goldman at any point in the second round.) Main Heat: The contestants are shown a Yule Log ("Bûche de Noël") cake and told they have 2 hours to create a dessert inspired by it. Winner: Terra Nelson Eliminated: David Bondarchuck	
5	"Great Holiday Traditions"	December 7, 2014
	Preliminary Heat: Make a peppermint and hot chocolate dessert in 45 minutes. Winner: Erin Campbell (Her advantage is exclusive use of a waffle iron and pancake griddle for the second round.) Main Heat: The contestants have 2 hours to make a breakfast feast featuring 3 sweet, baked dishes. Winner: Naylet Larochelle Eliminated: Terra Nelson	
6	"Gingerbread Worlds"	December 14, 2014
	Main Heat: The final three contestants have 10 hours to create a gingerbread display based on a favorite holiday memory, and incorporate three ginger infused baked items. Mid-round challenge is to add marzipan decorations. Winner of $50,000: Erin Campbell Runners-up: Bill Lipscomb and Naylet Larochelle	(Note: There's no pre-heat here. It's just one long, main round where the winner takes it all.)

=== Elimination Table ===
Place	Contestant	Episode					
Place	Contestant	1	2	3	4	5	6
1	Erin	HIGH‡	LOW	IN‡	IN‡	LOW‡	WINNER
2	Bill	HIGH	WIN	IN	HIGH	IN	RUNNER-UP
2	Naylet	WIN	IN	HIGH	LOW	WIN	RUNNER-UP
4	Terra	LOW	IN‡	LOW	WIN	ELIM	
5	David	IN	HIGH	WIN	ELIM		
6	Dante	IN	HIGH	ELIM			
7	Punky	IN	ELIM				
8	Stephanie	ELIM					

(WINNER) This baker won the competition.
(RUNNER-UP) This baker was a finalist.
(ELIM) This baker was eliminated.
(IN) This baker never had the best dish or the worst.
(HIGH) This baker had one of the best dish.
(WIN) This baker had the best dish in the main challenge.
‡ This baker had the best dish in the pre-heat challenge.
(LOW) This baker was last to be called safe.

== Season 2 ==
There were 10 contestants competing in an 8-episode baking tournament. In this season there's mid-round twists in several of the second rounds (in the form of an extra ingredient the contestants had to add to their confection). One person was eliminated every week until the final episode where the final three compete for the grand prize of $50,000.

=== Contestants ===
- 1st – Maeve Schulz, Bakery Owner from San Diego, California
- 2nd/3rd – Adalberto Diaz, Pastry Chef & Instructor from Salt Lake City, Utah
- 2nd/3rd – Steve Konopelski, Chef and Inn Co-Owner from Denton, Maryland
- 4th – Haley Miller, Bakery Owner from Beaver Dam, Kentucky
- 5th – Melody Larsen, Head Pastry Chef from Mesa, Arizona
- 6th – Padua Player, Executive Pastry Chef from Washington, D.C.
- 7th – Briana Johnson, Social Worker & Home Cook from Dallas, Texas
- 8th – Susan Steffan, Bed & Breakfast Owner from Galena, Illinois
- 9th – John Marasco, Firefighter in Thousand Oaks, California
- 10th – Joe Settepani, Pastry Sous Chef from Staten Island, New York

^Note: John Marasco's brother, Dante, competed in season 1 And He Is Eliminated In 3rd Episode

=== Episodes ===
Ep. #	Title	Original Air Date
1	"We're Nuts for the Holidays"	November 1, 2015
	Preliminary Heat: Each baker chose a nutcracker from a table with a tag that had a type of nut written on it. They had 90 minutes to make a nut & chocolate confection with their chosen nut. (Steve & Briana got pecans, Melody & John got almonds, Adalberto & Susan got Brazil nuts, Joe & Maeve got hazelnuts, Padua & Haley got walnuts.) Winner: Padua Player (His advantage was getting special tools, cookie cutters, and stencils for the next round.) Main Heat: The contestants had to bake a decorated pie in 2 hours. Winner: Susan Steffan Eliminated: Joe Settepani	
2	"Holiday Craftiness"	November 8, 2015
	Preliminary Heat: Make a baked dessert featuring candy canes in 1 hour. Winner: Susan Steffan (Her advantage was getting special decorations for her wreath in the next round.) Main Heat: The contestants had 90 minutes to create an edible wreath dessert. Mid-round twist is to incorporate oranges into the dessert. Winner: Steve Konopelski Eliminated: John Marasco	
3	"Stuffing Is the Best Part"	November 15, 2015
	Preliminary Heat: Make a holiday whoopie pie in 1 hour. Each contestant had to choose a turkey baster filled with a "decorating theme" (Melody & Padua got "turkey", Susan & Maeve got "pumpkin", Steve & Briana got "pilgrim", Haley & Adalberto got "fall foliage"). Winner: Steve Konopelski (His advantage was first choice of candy for the second round.) Main Heat: The contestants had 2 hours to make a cake stuffed with candy; they had a table of various candy choices from M&Ms to strawberry hard candies. Winner: Melody Larsen Eliminated: Susan Steffan	
4	"Thanksgiving's Just Around the Corner"	November 22, 2015
	Preliminary Heat: Make a dessert with canned cranberry sauce in 1 hour. Winner: Padua Player (His advantage is the ability to assign a fall ingredient to each contestant in the next round.) Main Heat: The contestants had 90 minutes to make a dessert with assigned fall fruits and vegetables. For winning the pre-heat, Padua chose apples for himself and gave butternut squash to Adalberto, pomegranates to Steve, carrots to Briana, sweet potato to Melody, corn to Maeve, and figs to Haley. Mid-round twist is to incorporate flavored marshmallows into the desserts (marshmallow flavors were coconut, chocolate, coffee, and salted caramel). Winner: Adalberto Diaz Eliminated: Briana Johnson	
5	"Ginger and Spice and Everything Nice"	November 29, 2015
	Preliminary Heat: Make a dozen mini desserts, in 1 hour, with ginger as the main ingredient. Winner: Steve Konopelski (His advantage was a 10-minute head start in the second round.) Main Heat: The contestants had 90 minutes to bake three different types of cookies, 1 dozen each, based on family traditions. Mid-round twist has each contestant using a specific tool on one of their cookies (meat crusher, muffin tin, and candy thermometer.) Winner: Melody Larsen Eliminated: Padua Player	
6	"World Class Classics"	December 6, 2015
	Preliminary Heat: Make an updated version of 2 traditional Hanukkah treats: rugelach and coconut macaroons. They had 75 minutes to bake. Winner: Haley Miller (Her advantage is 10 minutes of help from season 1 winner, Erin Campbell.) Main Heat: The contestants had 2 hours to make a holiday croquembouche. Winner: Maeve Schulz Eliminated: Melody Larsen	
7	"Re-Gifting"	December 13, 2015
	Preliminary Heat: Make a dessert from a candy apple in 75 minutes. Each contestant had to use a type of candy apple inside a gift wrapped box (Steve got a milk chocolate & coconut apple, Maeve got a white chocolate & cinnamon chip apple, Adalberto got a white chocolate & dried cherry apple, and Haley got a dark chocolate & almond apple). Winner: Adalberto Diaz (His advantage is revealed in the middle of the next round as a liquor assignment.) Main Heat: The contestants had 90 minutes to make a confection using three items from a gift basket (pears, pretzels, and chocolate caramels). Mid-round twist is to incorporate a specific liquor into the desserts. Since Adalberto won the pre-heat, he got to choose brandy for himself, then assigned coffee liquor to Maeve, orange liquor to Steve, and raspberry liquor to Haley. Winner: Adalberto Diaz Eliminated: Haley Miller	
8	"Holiday Hoopla"	December 20, 2015
	Preliminary Heat: Make two dozen holiday cookies in 3 hours and decorate a cookie tree. Winner: Maeve Schulz (Her advantage was the ability to assign the cake themes in the final round.) Main Heat: The contestants had 5 hours to make a festive cake based on a holiday activity. (Maeve chose "sleigh ride", then assigned "singing carols" to Steve, and assigned "tree trimming" to Adalberto). Winner of $50,000: Maeve Schulz Runners-up: Adalberto Diaz and Steve Konopelski	

=== Elimination Table ===
Place	Contestant	Episode							
Place	Contestant	1	2	3	4	5	6	7	8
1	Maeve	IN	LOW	IN	IN	HIGH	WIN	LOW	WINNER‡
2	Adalberto	HIGH	HIGH	HIGH	WIN	LOW	IN	WIN‡	RUNNER-UP
2	Steve	LOW	WIN	IN‡	IN	IN‡	HIGH	LOW	RUNNER-UP
4	Haley	IN	IN	HIGH	LOW	IN	LOW‡	ELIM	
5	Melody	IN	IN	WIN	IN	WIN	ELIM		
6	Padua	IN‡	IN	IN	IN‡	ELIM			
7	Briana	IN	IN	LOW	ELIM				
8	Susan	WIN	HIGH‡	ELIM					
9	John	LOW	ELIM						
10	Joe	ELIM							

(WINNER) This baker won the competition.
(RUNNER-UP) This baker was a finalist.
(WIN) This baker had the best dish in the main challenge.
‡ This baker had the best dish in the pre-heat challenge.
(HIGH) This baker had one of the best dishes.
(LOW) This baker was last to be called safe.
(ELIM) This baker was eliminated.

== Season 3 ==
There were 9 contestants competing in a 7-episode baking tournament. One person was eliminated every week until the final episode where the final three compete for the grand prize of $50,000. At the end of this season, there was a Holiday Baking Championship special episode where the three past season winners competed against three child bakers from the Kids Baking Championship.

=== Contestants ===
- 1st – Jason Smith, Cafeteria Manager from Grayson, Kentucky
- 2nd/3rd – Cheryl Storms, Bakery Owner from Oakland, California
- 2nd/3rd – Shawne Bryan, Executive Pastry Chef from Miami, Florida
- 4th – Matt Marotto, Executive Pastry Chef from Guttenberg, New Jersey
- 5th – Amber Croom, Pastry Chef from Vail, Colorado
- 6th – Vincenzo Vaccaro, Bakery Owner from Queens, New York
- 7th – Patti Curfman, Bakery Owner from Stayton, Oregon
- 8th – Maddie Carlos, Bakery Owner from Anoka, Minnesota
- 9th – Keli Fayard, Executive Pastry Chef from Charlotte, North Carolina

=== Episodes ===
Ep. #	Title	Original Air Date
1	"Signs of the Season"	November 6, 2016
	Preliminary Heat: Make a dessert inspired by a hot holiday drink in 1 hour. The contestants chose their beverage theme from unlabelled coffee cups. (Maddie = Irish cream latte, Jason = pumpkin spice latte, Cheryl = hot cocoa, Matt = peppermint mocha, Amber = mulled cider, Vincenzo = hazelnut latte, Keli = chai latte, Shawne = eggnog cappuccino, Patti = cinnamon mocha.) Winner: Matt Marotto (His advantage is first choice of the bundt pans for the next round.) Main Heat: The contestants have 2 hours to bake a filled bundt cake decorated like a wreath. Mid-round twist is to add "cookie leaves" on the cake wreath. Winner: Cheryl Storms Eliminated: Keli Fayard	
2	"Grandma's Thanksgiving Favorites"	November 13, 2016
	Preliminary Heat: : Make two types of holiday cookies in 45 minutes. One of them must be a sandwich cookie. Winner: Vincenzo Vaccaro (His advantage is 10 minutes of help from Grandma Norma, 3rd place contestant from 'Clash of the Grandmas'.) Main Heat: The contestants had 90 minutes to make a Thanksgiving pie by hand (no electric appliances allowed). Mid-round twist is to make an extra mini-pie in a different flavor. Winner: Vincenzo Vaccaro Eliminated: Maddie Carlos	
3	"Thanksgiving Joy"	November 20, 2016
	Preliminary Heat: Make a Thanksgiving trifle in 45 minutes. Winner: Jason Smith (His advantage is a 10-minute head start in the next round.) Main Heat: The contestants had 90 minutes to bake three cupcakes that resemble three different foods found in a Thanksgiving meal. Mid-round twist is to incorporate cranberries into one of the cupcakes. Winner: Cheryl Storms Eliminated: Patti Curfman	
4	"Hearth and Home"	November 27, 2016
	Preliminary Heat: Make a dessert in 45 minutes that highlights toasted marshmallows. Winner: Amber Croom (Her advantage is exclusive use of sparkly decorations including edible gold & silver leaf.) Main Heat: The contestants had 2 hours to update and "bling out" the classic Yule Log cake. Mid-round twist is to add a crunch element to their Yule Log dessert. Winner: Jason Smith Eliminated: Vincenzo Vaccaro	
5	"Sweet Surprises"	December 4, 2016
	Preliminary Heat: Make an ugly Christmas sweater dessert in 1 hour. Winner: Matt Marotto (His advantage is a selection of special molds and cutters for the next round.) Main Heat: The contestants had to create an edible gift box filled with baked goods in 2 hours. Mid-round twist is to incorporate popcorn into their treats. Winner: Matt Marotto Eliminated: Amber Croom	
6	"Christmas Morning"	December 11, 2016
	Preliminary Heat: Make a dessert shaped like a holiday stocking. Winner: Jason Smith (His advantage is pre-tempered chocolate revealed partway into the next round.) Main Heat: The contestants had to create a Christmas tree made of cream puffs. Mid-round twist is to make and add a chocolate tree topper. For winning the first round, Jason was the only one who got to use pre-tempered chocolate to make the topper and other decorations. Winner: Jason Smith Eliminated: Matt Marotto	
7	"Live From the North Pole"	December 18, 2016
	Preliminary Heat: Make one sweet and one savory snack for Santa's "overlooked North Pole friends" in 90 minutes. Each friend was a different animal plushy in a jack-in-the-box chosen by the contestants. (Jason got "reindeer", Shawne got "polar bear", and Cheryl got "penguin"). Winner: Shawne Bryan (His advantage is assigning the cake theme for his competitors in the final round) Main Heat: The final three must create a North Pole inspired cake using a wintery theme in 5 hours. As the winner of the pre-heat, Shawne chose the theme of "Snowman Family Christmas" then gave "Elves in the Workshop" to Jason, and "Santa's Sleigh Ride" to Cheryl. . Winner of $50,000: Jason Smith Runners-up: Cheryl Storms and Shawne Bryan	
8	Special: "Adults vs. Kids"^{1}	December 25, 2016
	Preliminary Heat: Make a rich, decadent holiday dessert in 1 hour. Winner: Jane Haviland (Her advantage is to pick each team for the second round.) Main Heat: Teams of two (one adult, one child) must create three different desserts to fill a little football dome model in 2 hours. Pairing up are: Jane Haviland & Maeve Schulz, Matthew Merrill & Erin Campbell, Jackson Fujimori & Jason Smith. Mid-round twist is to incorporate sprinkles into one of the treats. Winners of $10,000: Jackson Fujimori & Jason Smith Eliminated: Jane Haviland & Maeve Schulz-Rochford and Matthew Merrill & Erin Campbell	

^Note 1: Episode 8 was a special episode. Kids Baking Championship "fan favorite" contestants (Jackson Fujimori from season 1 and Matthew Merrill and Jane Haviland from season 2) vs. the three Holiday Baking Championship winners (season 1 winner Erin Campbell, season 2 winner Maeve Schulz-Rochford, and this season's winner Jason Smith). They competed for a chance at $10,000.

=== Elimination Table ===
Place	Contestant	Episode						
Place	Contestant	1	2	3	4	5	6	7
1	Jason	IN	IN	HIGH‡	WIN	LOW	WIN‡	WINNER^{2}
2	Cheryl	WIN	HIGH	WIN	IN	HIGH	HIGH	RUNNER-UP
2	Shawne	IN	LOW	IN	IN	IN	LOW	RUNNER-UP‡
4	Matt	IN‡	IN	LOW	LOW	WIN‡	ELIM	
5	Amber	IN	HIGH	IN	HIGH‡	ELIM		
6	Vincenzo	IN	WIN‡	IN	ELIM			
7	Patti	LOW	IN	ELIM				
8	Maddie	HIGH	ELIM					
9	Keli	ELIM						

(WINNER) This baker won the competition.
(RUNNER-UP) This baker was a finalist.
(WIN) This baker had the best dish in the main challenge.
‡ This baker had the best dish in the pre-heat challenge.
(HIGH) This baker had one of the best dishes.
(LOW) This baker was last to be called safe.
(ELIM) This baker was eliminated.

^Note 2: Jason Smith was the first home cook to win Holiday Baking Championship. He later went on to win season 13 of Food Network Star.

== Season 4 ==
As with the previous season, 9 contestants competed in a 7-episode baking tournament. One person was eliminated every week until the final episode where the final three compete for the $50,000 grand prize. There was an additional special episode that aired on Christmas Day bringing up runner-up contestants from previous seasons for a one-episode showdown.

=== Contestants ===
- 1st – Jennifer Barney, Bakery Owner from La Crosse, Wisconsin
- 2nd/3rd – Stephany Buswell, Pastry Arts Instructor from Santa Cruz, California
- 2nd/3rd – Joshua Livsey, Executive Pastry Chef from Boston, Massachusetts
- 4th – Ian Barthley, Culinary Arts Teacher from Upper Marlboro, Maryland
- 5th – Amy Strickland, Stay-at-Home Mom from Lake City, Florida^{1}
- 6th – Andra Chisholm, Head Baker, Daytona State College, from Daytona Beach, Florida
- 7th – Aristo Camburako, Executive Chef from Kansas City, Missouri
- 8th – Pablo Colon Sanchez, Executive Pastry Chef from Atlanta, Georgia
- 9th – Aveed Dai, Home Baker from Chicago, Illinois

^Note 1: Amy Strickland also appeared in season 2 of Halloween Baking Championship; she was forced to withdraw from that competition due to stress concerns since she was 6 months pregnant.

=== Episodes ===
Ep. #	Title	Original Air Date
1	"Holiday Party Delights"	November 6, 2017
	Preliminary Heat: Make a candy cane dessert in 90 minutes. Each baker chose a candy cane from a table. (Amy got green apple flavor, Ian got salted caramel flavor, Stephany got raspberry flavor, Pablo got caramel macchiato flavor, Jennifer got cherry flavor, Aveed got orange flavor, Aristo got blueberry flavor, Andra got hot cocoa flavor, Joshua got pineapple flavor.) Winner: Aveed Dai (Her advantage was getting shelled peanuts in the second round, while the others had to remove shells from their peanuts.) Main Heat: The contestants had 2 hours to make a dessert inspired by a holiday cocktail they blindly picked from a table. (Ian got apple pie martini, Joshua got champagne cocktail, Aveed got hot buttered rum, Stephany got mulled wine, Amy got amaretto sour, Aristo got cider punch, Jennifer got cranberry julep, Pablo pomegranate cosmopolitan, and Andra got a hot toddy). Mid-round twist is to incorporate salted peanuts (still in their shell) into their dish. Winner: Joshua Livsey Eliminated: Aveed Dai	
2	"Season of Sharing"	November 13, 2017
	Preliminary Heat: : Working in teams of 2, they'll have to make a dozen seasonally-shaped hand pies in 90 minutes. The autumn cookie cutters they pick out of a bag determines who gets paired up with who: Stephany & Jennifer (maple leaf), Aristo & Andra (turkey), Joshua & Ian (pumpkin), Pablo & Amy (acorn). Winner: Joshua Livsey & Ian Barthley (Their advantage in the Main Heat was to choose the teams) Main Heat: The contestants had to pair up again to create a holiday dessert duo inspired by classic holiday flavor combinations. They had 90 minutes to bake. Ian picked Stephany (pecan & caramel), Joshua picked Jennifer (chocolate & orange), Pablo got paired with Aristo (cranberry & ginger), and Andra got paired with Amy (peppermint & chocolate). Mid-round twist is to incorporate eggnog into their desserts. Winner: Jennifer Barney Eliminated: Pablo Colon Sanchez	
3	"Thanksgiving Genius"	November 20, 2017
	Preliminary Heat: Make a Thanksgiving dessert in 1 hour using a mystery canned item. (Joshua got canned plum, Stephany got pumpkin, Aristo got apricot, Ian got cranberry, Andra got peaches, Jennifer got mandarin oranges, and Amy got pineapple). Winner: Amy Strickland (Her advantage was the ability to switch dessert combinations with another baker) Main Heat: The bakers have 90 minutes to create a new Turkey Day sensation by combining two traditional desserts (written and stuffed into decorative gourds). For winning the pre-heat, Amy traded 'blueberry cobbler & chocolate mousse' for Andra's 'pumpkin pie & brownies'. Jennifer got 'lemon bar & pecan pie'. Aristo got 'apple crumble & crème brûlée', Joshua got 's'mores & apple pie', Ian got 'grasshopper pie & blondie', and Stephany got 'tiramisu & bread pudding'. Mid-round twist is to incorporate sweet potatoes into their sweet treats. Winner: Stephany Buswell Eliminated: Aristo Camburako	
4	"A New Holiday Spin"	November 27, 2017
	Preliminary Heat: The contestants have 1 hour to use yellow cake mix to make anything but a cake. Winner: Ian Barthley (His advantage is a ten-minute head start in the second round.) Main Heat: The bakers have 90 minutes to put a festive spin on a non-holiday dessert (thanks to his advantage, Ian has the full 90 minutes while the rest only have 80 minutes). The contestants picked sealed holiday cards to see what dessert they'd have to transform: Ian got 'coconut cream pie', Stephany got 'strawberry shortcake', Jennifer got 'fruit tart', Joshua got 'birthday cake', Andra got 'banana pudding', and Amy got a 'red white & blueberry trifle'. Mid-round twist is to add fresh cherries into their desserts. Winner: Stephany Buswell Eliminated: Andra Chisholm	
5	"Comfort and Joy"	December 4, 2017
	Preliminary Heat: Create a holiday flambé dessert in 1 hour. Winner: Joshua Livsey (His advantage was assigning cheeses in the second round.) Main Heat: The contestants had 2 hours to take a holiday cheese board and turn it into an unusual cheesecake. Joshua picked goat cheese and he assigned feta to Stephany, blue cheese to Ian, cheddar to Amy, and Brie cheese to Jennifer. Mid-round twist is to pick a cheese board accompaniment and incorporate it into their cheesecake (Amy grabbed almonds, Stephany grabbed pistachios, Joshua grabbed balsamic vinegar, Ian grabbed dates, and Jennifer grabbed fig jam). Winner: Joshua Livsey Eliminated: Amy Strickland	
6	"Tradition! Tradition!"	December 11, 2017
	Preliminary Heat: Bake a dozen Hanukkah jelly doughnuts, in 90 minutes, featuring two flavor combination picked blind from Hannukah gelt. (Joshua got 'blueberry & chili', Stephany got 'pear & basil', Ian got 'strawberry & ginger', Jennifer got 'apricot & citrus'.) Winner: Jennifer Barney (Her advantage is exclusive use of special ingredients and molded pans to use in the second round) Main Heat: The contestants had 2 hours to reinvent the fruitcake. Mid-round twist requires all the bakers to make butterscotch from scratch and add it to their desserts. Winner: Joshua Livsey Eliminated: Ian Barthley	
7	"Twelve Days of Christmas"	December 18, 2017
	Preliminary Heat: In 90 minutes, combine two last-minute holiday gifts into one dessert. (Stephany got 'butter cookies & popcorn', Joshua got 'Irish cream & peppermint bark', Jennifer got 'Pinot Noir & chocolate caramel pecan clusters'.) Winner: Stephany Buswell (Her advantage is three chances at picking a theme in the second round, with the ability to discard her first two choices and give them to her competitors.) Main Heat: The final three bakers have five hours to create a dessert inspired by a line from the song "Twelve Days of Christmas". Stephany had twelve numbered panels to choose from (the song lines did not correspond with the numbers). Door 7 had "12 drummers drumming" and was given to Joshua. Door 1 had "6 geese a'laying" and was given to Jennifer. On her last pick, Door 4, Stephany ended up with "8 maids a'milking". Mid-round twist is to make a dozen petit fours presents to go with the main dessert. Winner of $50,000: Jennifer Barney Runners-up: Stephany Buswell and Joshua Livsey	
8	Special: "Runners Up Redemption"^{2}	December 25, 2017
	Preliminary Heat: Baking teams must use real children's letters to Santa to inspire a holiday dessert. It must be made in 90 minutes. (Steve Konopelski & Adalberto Diaz got a letter asking for a 'deep fryer', Cheryl Storms & Shawne Bryan got a letter asking for 'roller skates', Bill Lipscomb & Naylet Larochelle got a letter asking for a 'science kit'.) Winner: Bill & Naylet (Their advantage was picking the flavor of their cupcakes in the second round, which no other team could use.) Main Heat: Teams had 2 1/2 hours to bake cupcakes and assemble them into one giant edible holiday tree. Bill & Naylet chose eggnog flavor for their cupcakes. Mid-round twist is to bake a dozen cookie ornaments to go on their cupcake tree. Winners of $10,000: Cheryl Storms & Shawne Bryan Eliminated: Bill Lipscomb & Naylet Larochelle and Steve Konopelski & Adalberto Diaz	

^Note 2: Episode 8 was a special episode. Six runner-up competitors from previous season finales returned to battle it out for a chance to win $10,000 (They were paired up into teams of two representing their respective seasons: Bill Lipscomb and Naylet Larochelle from season 1, Steve Konopelski and Adalberto Diaz from season 2, and Cheryl Storms and Shawne Bryan from season 3).

=== Elimination Table ===
Place	Contestant	Episode						
Place	Contestant	1	2	3	4	5	6	7
1	Jennifer	IN	WIN	IN	HIGH	LOW	HIGH‡	WINNER
2	Joshua	WIN	IN‡	IN	HIGH	WIN‡	WIN	RUNNER UP
2	Stephany	HIGH	HIGH	WIN	WIN	HIGH	LOW	RUNNER UP‡
4	Ian	IN	IN‡	HIGH	LOW‡	IN	ELIM	
5	Amy	IN	IN	IN‡	LOW	ELIM		
6	Andra	LOW	LOW	LOW	ELIM			
7	Aristo	HIGH	IN	ELIM				
8	Pablo	IN	ELIM					
9	Aveed	ELIM‡						

(WINNER) This baker won the competition.
(RUNNER-UP) This baker was a finalist.
(WIN) This baker had the best dish in the main challenge.
‡ This baker had the best dish in the pre-heat challenge.
(HIGH) This baker had one of the best dishes.
(LOW) This baker was last to be called safe.
(ELIM) This baker was eliminated.

== Season 5 ==
As with the previous season, 9 contestants competed in a 7-episode baking tournament where one contestant was sent home every week until the final three remain. However unlike previous seasons, the prize money has been halved this year; the winner gets $25,000 as well as a spot in Food Network Magazine and their own video on foodnetwork.com.

=== Contestants ===
- 1st – Douglas Phillips, Baking and Pastry Instructor from Ayer, Massachusetts
- 2nd/3rd – Lerome Campbell, Pastry Chef from Naples, Florida
- 2nd/3rd – Sarah Lucia Tafur, Bakery Owner from Miami, Florida
- 4th – Chantal Thomas, Bakery Owner from Windsor, Connecticut
- 5th – Dan Raymond, Pastry Shop Owner from Castleton, New York
- 6th – Julia Perugini, Self-Taught Baker from Maricopa, Arizona
- 7th – Sherry Clarke, Home Baker from East Lyme, Connecticut
- 8th – Nolan Schooley, Pastry Chef from Sanford, Michigan
- 9th – Jamie Decena, Executive Pastry Chef from Chula Vista, California

^Note 1: Julia Perugini was previously featured as a competitor on Christmas Cookie Challenge.

=== Episodes ===
Ep. #	Title	Original Air Date
1	"Holiday Essentials"	November 5, 2018
	Preliminary Heat: The contestants were challenged to make a pumpkin spice dessert in 90 minutes. Winner: Lerome Campbell (His advantage was to switch his dessert with another contestant in the next round) Main Heat: The bakers had 2 hours to make yule log mashups. For his advantage, Lerome traded his "peppermint swirl cheesecake" for Julia's "Linzer cookie". Douglas got "ginger molasses cookie". Dan got "chocolate cheesecake". Sherry got "pecan pie". Chantal got "sweet potato pie". Sarah got "pinwheel cookie". Jamie got "pumpkin cheesecake". Nolan got "apple pie". Mid-round twist is to add brandy to their dessert mashup. Winner: Douglas Phillips Eliminated: Jamie Decena	
2	"Plenty of Gratitude"	November 12, 2018
	Preliminary Heat:In a team challenge, the contestants had to make four different pies in the same sheet pan, all in 2 hours. The teams were chosen by matching up pie servers: Sarah & Dan, Chantal & Lerome, Julia & Nolan, and Douglas & Sherry Winner: Chantal Thomas & Lerome Campbell (Their advantage was first choice of cake flavor in the next round) Main Heat: The bakers had 2 hours to make stuffed cakes. Chantal & Lerome chose to stuff their cakes with "pear". Douglas chose "cherry". Dan chose "apple". Sherry chose "apple". Julia chose "blood orange". Nolan chose "cherry". Sarah chose "blood orange". Mid-round twist was to add mint into their cakes. Winner: Douglas Phillips Eliminated: Nolan Schooley	
3	"Turkey Day Delights"	November 19, 2018
	Preliminary Heat: The contestants had 90 minutes to pair a fall ingredient with cranberry. Sarah got rosemary. Julia got chocolate. Dan got pistachio. Sherry got ginger. Chantal got pumpkin. Douglas got lime. Lerome got fig. Winner: Sarah Lucia Tafur (Her advantage was 10 minutes of help from Duff Goldman) Main Heat: The bakers had 90 minutes to create a sweet treat that paired coffee with an unusual flavored coffee syrup. Chantal grabbed pomegranate syrup. Sarah grabbed peanut butter syrup. Douglas grabbed root beer syrup. Sherry grabbed green apple syrup. Lerome grabbed shortbread syrup. Julia grabbed blueberry syrup. Dan grabbed blackberry syrup. Mid-round twist is to add biscotti into the recipe. Winner: Lerome Campbell Eliminated: Sherry Clarke	
4	"Holiday Artistry"	November 26, 2018
	Preliminary Heat: The contestants had 90 minutes to make a cream puff family. Douglas had to make a Santa family. Sarah had to make a gingerbread man family. Lerome had to make a snowman family. Don had to make a penguin family. Julia had to make an elf family. Chantal had to make a reindeer family. Winner: Douglas Phillips (His advantage was a ten-minute head start in addition to the original 2 hours) Main Heat: The bakers had 2 hours to make a hand-painted holiday eggnog cake. Mid-round twist is to add a separate edible holly decoration without using fondant or gum-paste. Winner: Dan Raymond Eliminated: Julia Perugini	
5	"Light and Inspiring"	December 3, 2018
	Preliminary Heat: They had 90 minutes to make two dozen specially flavored rugelach. The bakers grabbed Hannukah gift boxes with their mandatory flavor inside; Doug got chai, Lerome got grapefruit, Chantal got guava paste, Sarah got cardamom, and Dan got peanut butter. Winner: Sarah Lucia Tafur (Her advantage being able to switch one of her second round ingredients for another contestant's ingredients) Main Heat: Each contestant had 90 minutes to create a tiramisu using two favorite ingredients of their judge of choice. Picking blindly from a wall of numbered panels, Sarah chose Duff's favorites: dates & speculoos. Doug chose Lorraine's favorites: vanilla & matcha. Chantal chose Nancy's favorites: bourbon & apple butter. Dan chose Nancy's favorites: coconut & hazelnut. Lerome chose Lorraine's favorites: coffee & ginger. Sarah opted not to use her advantage and didn't switch any ingredients. Mid-round twist was to add host Jesse Palmer's favorite ingredient: maple syrup. Winner: Lerome Campbell Eliminated: Dan Raymond	
6	"New Family Classics"	December 10, 2018
	Preliminary Heat: The bakers had 90 minutes to update a holiday chocolate dish with regular pantry ingredients. Chantal added 'strawberry jelly' and 'dried apricots' to chocolate cake. Sarah added 'olive oil' and 'balsamic vinegar' to chocolate chip cookies. Doug added 'oats' and 'coconut' to chocolate cream pie. Lerome added 'potato chips' and 'red wine' to chocolate trifle. Winner: Chantal Thomas (Her advantage was to assign ingredients to everyone in the second round) Main Heat: Everyone had 90 minutes to transform two fruitcake ingredients (one nut, and one fruit) into a new dessert. Chantal's advantage allowed her to choose first so she picked hazelnuts and candied orange. She gave Sarah almonds and candied cherries. She gave Doug walnuts and dried pineapple. She gave Lerome pecans and candied lemon. Mid-round twist was to incorporate actual fruitcake into their dessert. Winner: Douglas Phillips Eliminated: Chantal Thomas	
7	"Gifts of Greatness"	December 17, 2018
	Preliminary Heat: The contestants had to make two dozen edible ornaments in 2 hours. Winner: Lerome Campbell (His advantage was exclusive use of a cake flavor in the final round) Main Heat: The final three had 5 hours to create a holiday gift cake with a surprise inside. Lerome chose chocolate cake as his cake flavor advantage. Winner of $25,000: Douglas Phillips Runners-up: Lerome Campbell and Sarah Lucia Tafur	
8	Special: "Homecoming Special"^{2}	December 24, 2018
	Preliminary Heat: Returning champions were paired up and they had to make holiday éclair light strings in 90 minutes. Maeve and Jason were paired up (Holiday). Jen (Holiday) and Jordan (Spring) were paired up. Michelle (Halloween) and Nacho (Spring) were paired up. Winners: Jennifer & Jordan (Their advantage was assigning cake colors and ingredients in the next round.) Main Heat: Working in the same teams, the contestants had five hours to make silver or gold cakes, and include a special ingredient specific to them. Jen & Jordan chose "silver" and "25-year-old balsamic", they assigned "gold" and "saffron" to Jason & Maeve, and gave "silver" and "Manuka honey" to Michelle & Nacho. Mid-round twist is to make a dozen cupcakes in the opposite color and it had to be a different flavor from their cakes. Winners of $10,000: Jennifer Barney & Jordan Pilarski Eliminated: Jason Smith & Maeve Rochford and Michelle Antonishek & Nacho Aguirre	

^Note 2: In Episode 8, six past baking champions (from the various baking spin-offs) return in a "best of the best" competition. The judges (Nancy, Duff, and Lorraine) also served as hosts. The contestants were: Maeve Rochford from season 2, Jason Smith from season 3, and Jen Barney from season 4 of Holiday Baking Championship, Jordan Pilarski from season 3 and Nacho Aguirre from season 4 of Spring Baking Championship, and Michelle Antonishek from season 2 of Halloween Baking Championship.

=== Elimination Table ===
Place	Contestant	Episode						
Place	Contestant	1	2	3	4	5	6	7
1	Douglas	WIN	WIN	HIGH	IN‡	LOW	WIN	WINNER
2	Lerome	IN‡	IN‡	WIN	LOW	WIN	LOW	RUNNER-UP‡
2	Sarah	IN	IN	IN‡	HIGH	HIGH‡	LOW	RUNNER-UP
4	Chantal	HIGH	HIGH‡	LOW	IN	IN	ELIM‡	
5	Dan	IN	LOW	IN	WIN	ELIM		
6	Julia	IN	IN	IN	ELIM			
7	Sherry	LOW	IN	ELIM				
8	Nolan	IN	ELIM					
9	Jamie	ELIM						

(WINNER) This baker won the competition.
(RUNNER-UP) This baker was a finalist.
(WIN) This baker had the best dish in the main challenge.
‡ This baker had the best dish in the pre-heat challenge.
(HIGH) This baker had one of the best dishes.
(LOW) This baker was last to be called safe.
(ELIM) This baker was eliminated.

^Note 3: In episode 2, there was a teams event causing two people to win the advantage.

== Season 6 ==
=== Contestants ===
- 1st – Melissa Yanc, Bakery Owner from Healdsburg, California
- 2nd - Jennifer Clifford, Pastry Chef from Moultonborough, New Hampshire
- 3rd - Sarah Wallace, Bakery General Manager from Boston, Massachusetts
- 4th – Geoffrey Blount, Baking and Pastry Arts Instructor from Myrtle Beach, South Carolina
- 5th – Dwight Penney, Executive Pastry Chef from Pittsburgh, Pennsylvania
- 6th – Janet Letendre, Home Bakery Owner from Malakwa, British Columbia
- 7th – Cedrick Simpson, Pastry Chef from Atlanta, Georgia
- 8th – Kobe Doan, Home Baker from Boston, Massachusetts
- 9th – Maria Short, Bakery Owner from Hilo, Hawaii
- 10th – Devon Maciver, Home Baker from Claremont, California

=== Episodes Draft ===
Ep. #	Title	Original Air Date
1	"Gearing Up for the Holidays - Draft"	November 4, 2019
	Preliminary Heat: The ten new bakering contestants of the season have to introduce themselves by making an edible place card with their name and a one-bite signature holiday desserts of their choice in 2 hours. Winner: Sarah Wallace (Her advantage was being able to choose her holiday flavour first.) Main Heat: The contestants must bake a Danish kransekage wreath cake towers incorporating a holiday flavour: lemon, chestnuts, pistachios, graham crackers, toffee, dried cherries, chocolate covered espresso beans, dried apricots, pomegranate, and white chocolate covered pretzels in 2 hours. Sarah used her preheat advantage to choose pistachios. Mid-round twist is for everyone to add an edible bow to their wreath cake towers. Winner: Kobe Doan with a chocolate espresso beans kransekage tower. Eliminated: Devon Maciver	
2	"Filling Grateful - Draft"	November 11, 2019
	Preliminary Heat: The nine remaining bakers make holiday spiced nuts desserts in 2 hours. Flavours included turmeric-ginger spiced cashews, rosemary spiced nuts, sweet habanero peanuts, Mexican spiced chocolate nuts, smoky candied almonds, maple-bacon spiced nuts, Indian spiced nuts, pumpkin spiced pecans, and holiday mulling spiced nuts. Winner: Melissa Yanc (Advantage: The winner of preheat can switch their filling for anyone else's filling in the main heat.) Main Heat: The contestants have 2 hour to make a decorated harvest pie tower of 3 pies of different sizes with different decorations but all with the same harvest filling. Harvest fillings were ginger, cranberries, maple, plum, apple, pear, pumpkin, figs, and sweet potatoes. Melissa used her advantage to switch with Maria to get plum filling instead of ginger. Mid-round twist that each contested must create a flavoured whipped cream to go with their pies. Winner: Melissa Yanc Eliminated: Maria Short	
3	"Thanksgiving It My All - Draft"	November 18, 2019
	Preliminary Heat: The eight bakers make "Next level kicked up Apple cider donuts" with fall themes in 2 hours. Themes were pine cones, early frost, apple picking, cornucopia, cozy scarves, warm fire, mittens, and fall leaves. Winner: Dwight Penney (His advantage is an exclusive use of cutters and stencils to create his inlaid design.) Main Heat: Thanksgiving spin on Yule log. Contestants have 2 hours to create an inlaid thanksgiving roll cake. Mid-round twist is to include a fall flavours of either raisins, hazelnuts, orange, or dark chocolate. Winner: Jennifer Clifford Eliminated: Kobe Doan	
4	"Trendsetting Turkey Day -Draft"	November 25, 2019
	Preliminary Heat: The seven bakers had 90 minutes to make baked Brie and jam mini pies with jam they had to make themselves. The jam flavours were blood-orange marmalade, peach-basil, blackberry thymes, blueberry lemon, spiced pear, apricot ginger, and cardamom apple. Winner: Sarah (Her advantage is first choice of the prepared ingredients for the main heat.) Main Heat: The contestants have 90 minutes to take a prepared ingredient and use them in a novel way to make a crowd-pleasing Thanksgiving dessert. Ingredients were pumpkin butter, chocolate-hazelnut spread, cookie butter, puff pastry, boxed cake mix, canned crescent rolls, and chocolate chip cookie dough. Sarah used her advantage to gain chocolate-hazelnut spread. The mid-round twist was that canned cranberry sauce must be incorporated into their desserts. Winner: Jennifer Clifford Eliminated: Cedrick Simpson	
5	"Gettin' Gifty with It -Draft"	December 2, 2019
	Preliminary Heat: The remaining six bakers have 90 minutes to turn panettone, the classic holiday Italian sweet bread, into an entirely new dessert. Winner: Geoffrey Blount (His advantage is a 10-minute head start on the main heat.) Main Heat: The contestants have 2 hours to make a beautifully decorated cupcake pull-apart mosaic inspired by a pair of holiday pajamas. The twist was the cupcakes must have a filling, the filling flavours were cherry curd, citrus compote, spiced pastry cream, white chocolate ganache, raspberry mousse, and applesauce. Winner: Sarah Wallace Eliminated: Janet Letendre	
6	"North Pole Vaulting -Draft"	December 9, 2019
	Preliminary Heat: The five bakes create have 90 minutes to create desserts that are inspired by and look like Santa Claus. Assigned dessert types were mini layer cakes, whoopie pies, macrons, cake pops, and cream puffs. Winner: Dwight (His advantage is a basket of tools and decorating supplies.) Main Heat: The contestants have 2 hours to make an impressive cakes made to look like an igloo with meringue frosting. The twist was the bakers must also make an ice cream to go with their igloo cakes. Winner: Jennifer Clifford Eliminated: Dwight Penney	
7	"Traditions with a Twist -Draft"	December 16, 2019
	Preliminary Heat: The four remaining bakers need to make Hanukkah gelt, gold-covered chocolate coin, desserts incorporating chocolate and either pistachio, candied orange, espresso beans, smoked salt or toasted coconut. They must also make their own original, differently flavoured, handmade gelt chocolate coin. Winner: Sarah Wallace (Her advantage is to be able to choose her cheesecake crust and assign crusts to the other baker.) Main Heat: The contestants have 2 hours to make delicious cheesecakes decorated with an edible shiny ice rink on top. Assigned crust types were ginger snap, oat crumble, pretzel and graham cracker. Sarah used her advantage to pick a graham cracker crust and assigned Geoffrey a pretzel crust, Melissa a ginger snap crust, and Jennifer an oat crumble crust. The twist was that the contestants must incorporate hot cocoa mix into their dessert. Winner: Melissa Yanc Eliminated: Geoffrey Blount	
8	"Christmas Day Delights -Draft"	December 23, 2019
	Preliminary Heat: The final three bakers make a "lavious" Christmas morning brunch with 3 items each using one of the classic holiday flavors of gingerbread, cinnamon, and eggnog in 2 hours. Winner: Sarah Wallace (Her advantage is she gets to choose her colour palette and assign the colour palettes of the other cakes.) Main Heat: The contestants have 5 hours to the bakers must create holiday plaid cakes that are plaid both on the inside and the outside. Sarah used her advantage to red and black plaid for herself and gave Melissa the blue and green plaid while Jennifer got the black and white plaid. Note that there was no twist! Winner of $25,000: Melissa Yanc Runners-up: Jennifer Clifford and Sarah Wallace	

=== Elimination Table ===
Place	Contestant	Episode							
Place	Contestant	1	2	3	4	5	6	7	8
1	Melissa	LOW	WIN‡	IN	HIGH	IN	IN	WIN	WINNER
2	Jennifer	HIGH	IN	WIN	WIN	HIGH	WIN	LOW	RUNNER-UP
2	Sarah	IN‡	IN	LOW	IN‡	WIN	HIGH	HIGH‡	RUNNER-UP‡
4	Geoffrey	IN	IN	HIGH	IN	IN‡	LOW	ELIM	
5	Dwight	IN	HIGH	IN‡	IN	LOW	ELIM‡		
6	Janet	IN	IN	IN	LOW	ELIM			
7	Cedrick	IN	IN	IN	ELIM				
8	Kobe	WIN	LOW	ELIM					
9	Maria	IN	ELIM						
10	Devon	ELIM							

(WINNER) This baker won the competition.
(RUNNER-UP) This baker was a finalist.
(WIN) This baker had the best dish in the main challenge.
‡ This baker had the best dish in the pre-heat challenge.
(HIGH) This baker had one of the best dishes.
(LOW) This baker was last to be called safe.
(ELIM) This baker was eliminated.

== Season 7 ==
12 bakers enter the kitchen to compete for the $25,000 prize, a chance to be featured on the Food Network Kitchen app, and the title of Holiday Baking Champion. New this year, the bakers will be ranked on the "Naughty or Nice" list after each challenge. The lowest ranked baker after each main heat will be eliminated from the competition. However, in the first episode of the season, the lowest ranked baker after the first pre-heat was eliminated.

=== Contestants ===
- 1st - Julianna Jung, Home Baker from Champaign, Illinois
- 2nd/3rd - Lorenzo Delgado, Pastry Chef from Miami, Florida
- 2nd/3rd - Megan Rountree, Bakery Owner from Keller, Texas
- 4th - Eva Roberts, Bakery Owner from Spokane, Washington
- 5th - Lashonda Sanford, Bakery Owner from Newport News, Virginia
- 6th - Jon Buatti, Bakery Owner from Auburn, New Hampshire
- 7th - Jamaal Nettles, Pastry Chef from Atlanta, Georgia
- 8th - Kess Eshun, Pastry Chef and Bakery Owner from Frisco, Texas
- 9th - Jeffrey Gray, Home Baker from Atlanta, Georgia
- 10th - Aubrey Shaffner, Pastry Chef from Baltimore, Maryland
- 11th - Kristina Stephenson, Pastry Chef from Spokane, Washington
- 12th - Jonathan Peregrino, Pastry Chef from Detroit, Michigan

=== Episodes ===
Ep. #	Title	Original Air Date
1	"Holiday Style"	November 2, 2020
	Preliminary Heat: The bakers had 2 hours to make quick bread wreaths with a flavor combination they pulled off a mini-wreath hanging around the kitchen (maple pecan, spiced pear, orange cranberry, ginger citrus, apple cinnamon, or chocolate orange). Winner: Kess Eshun (Her advantage was first pick of the hats in the main heat.) Eliminated: Jonathan Peregrino Main Heat: The bakers had 2 hours to make winter hat cakes that looked like the hats they chose. Mid-round twist is they had to add their name onto their cake legibly and to give it an embroidered look. Winner: Megan Rountree Eliminated: Kristina Stephenson	
2	"Holiday Goodie Games"	November 9, 2020
	Preliminary Heat: The bakers had 2 hours to add a nut or seed into their dessert, but they were forbidden from making a pie. Megan grabbed walnut, Lashonda grabbed macadamia nut, Lorenzo grabbed pine nut, Aubrey grabbed poppy seed, Eva grabbed sunflower seed, Jeffrey grabbed sesame seed, Jamaal grabbed pumpkin seed, Kess grabbed almond, Julianna grabbed pistachio, and Jon grabbed hazelnut. Winner: Jamaal Nettles (His advantage was to pick the mid-round twist ingredient all the bakers had to also incorporate in their main heat dish.) Main Heat: The bakers had 2 hours to holiday up a non-holiday dessert (key lime pie, icebox cake, fruit tart, lemon meringue pie, or ice cream cake) and add a holiday spin to it they spun randomly on a wheel (dried fruits, holiday spices, or holiday spirits). Mid-round twist is to add one more non-holiday ingredient into their dish (strawberry, pineapple, or mango). Jamaal chose mango for his advantage. Winner: Lorenzo Delgado Eliminated: Aubrey Shaffner	
3	"Take Holiday Pies by Surprise"	November 16, 2020
	Preliminary Heat: The bakers were challenged to bake mini pies with holiday cookie toppings in 2 hours in an assigned flavor. Lorenzo grabbed cherry, Jamaal grabbed blackberry, Megan grabbed cookie butter, Eva grabbed butterscotch, Lashonda grabbed pecan, Jeffrey grabbed chess, Kess grabbed peppermint, Jon grabbed peanut butter, and Julianna grabbed coconut custard. Winner: Lorenzo Delgado (His advantage was exemption from the twist of including eggnog in his main heat dish.) Main Heat: The bakers were given 2 hours to make different fall-flavored holiday pies with different types of pies. Lorenzo grabbed pumpkin & cider and cream pie, Jon grabbed cranberry & almond and cream pie, Eva grabbed apple & fennel and lattice pie, Lashonda grabbed chestnut & chocolate and slab pie, Jeffrey grabbed bourbon & pear and slab pie, Kess grabbed sweet potato & pecan and double crust pie, Julianna grabbed sweet potato & chai and double crust pie, Jamaal grabbed butternut squash & maple and custard pie, and Megan grabbed apple & raisin and lattice pie. Winner: Julianna Jung Eliminated: Jeffrey Gray	
4	"Hosting the Holidays"	November 23, 2020
	Preliminary Heat: The bakers had 90 minutes to turn common breakfasts into Thanksgiving desserts. They chose in the order of their placement on the "naughty or nice" list from the previous week's main heat. Julianna/Lorenzo chose French toast, Lashonda/Eva chose toaster pastry, Jon/Jamaal chose scone, and Kess/Megan chose breakfast crepe. Winner: Jamaal Nettles (His advantage was he got to pick his teammate and assign the remaining teams.) Main Heat: The bakers had 2 hours to turn common Friendsgiving potluck dishes using an ingredient featured in them in their own dessert. The bakers worked in teams, but they competed against each other with the top team member being in the top four and the bottom team member being up for elimination. Jon/Lashonda got glazed carrots, Lorenzo/Megan got balsamic brussels sprouts, Jamaal/Eva got creamed corn, and Kess/Julianna got sage & sausage stuffing. Mid-round twist is to add champagne into their desserts. Winner: Eva Roberts Eliminated: Kess Eshun	
5	"It's What's on the Inside That Counts"	November 30, 2020
	Preliminary Heat: The bakers had 90 minutes to make an Advent calendar dessert featuring a chocolate and with a surprise inside. Jon got blonde chocolate, Megan/Lashonda got white chocolate, Jamaal/Julianna got milk chocolate, and Lorenzo/Eva got dark chocolate. Winner: Lorenzo Delgado (His advantage was he had exclusive use of a flavor for his cheesecakes that nobody else could use for any of theirs. He chose chocolate.) Main Heat: The bakers had 2 hours to make a cheesecake with 3 different flavors. Mid-round twist is to create 3 different decorations to display what flavor each section of cheesecake is and at least 2 of them had to be baked. Winner: Lashonda Sanford Eliminated: Jamaal Nettles	
6	"Topsy-Turvy Holidays"	December 7, 2020
	Preliminary Heat: In a team challenge, the bakers had 90 minutes to make a dessert inspired by Hanukkah jelly-filled doughnuts with required fried dough and jelly components. The teams were paired up by dreidels with matching colors on one side: Megan & Lashonda, Jon & Eva, and Lorenzo & Julianna. In a twist because of his love for jelly-filled doughnuts, Duff Goldman judged the preheat by himself instead of all 3 judges as normal. Winner: Lashonda Sanford and Megan Rountree (Their advantage was an exclusive basket of decorating materials to decorate their upside-down cakes including things like cookie cutters, candies, and fondant. All other decorating materials were removed from the kitchen, so no one else could use them.) Main Heat: The bakers had 2 hours to transform upside-down cakes into a holiday dessert. They picked ornaments off a tree that indicated what their fruit flavor and decorating assignment would be for the cake. Lashonda grabbed fig and holiday lights. Megan grabbed plum and tree ornaments. Julianna grabbed pear and Christmas star. Jon grabbed blood orange and poinsettia. Eva grabbed cranberry and holiday presents. Lorenzo grabbed apple and fall leaves. Mid-round twist is to include fresh rosemary into their upside-down cakes. Winner: Megan Rountree Eliminated: Jon Buatti	
7	"A Classic Christmas"	December 14, 2020
	Preliminary Heat: The bakers had 90 minutes to make a holiday trifle. They had to include three distinct layers: a cream or custard, a jam or jelly, and a cookie or cake in an assigned flavor. Megan picked pistachio, Julianna picked peppermint, Lorenzo picked cinnamon, Lashonda picked coffee, and Eva picked gingerbread. Winner: Lorenzo Delgado (His advantage was a 10-minute head start in the main heat ahead of the other bakers, so he had 2 hours and 10 minutes.) Main Heat: The bakers had 2 hours to make the ultimate Charlotte Royale fit for Santa Claus in an assigned flavor. Lorenzo picked raspberry, Eva picked ginger, Lashonda picked praline, Megan picked chocolate, and Julianna picked pumpkin. Mid-round twist is to add a baked item that looks like a holly leaf onto their Charlotte Royale. Winner: Megan Rountree Eliminated: Lashonda Sanford	
8^{1}	"Christmas Windows in Time"	December 21, 2020
	Preliminary Heat: The bakers had 3 hours to make holiday macaron trees, not in the shape of a Christmas tree, but in graduating large to small tiers. However, instead of competing for an advantage, the bakers were competing for a spot in the Main Heat with the least two successful bakers facing off against each other and the winner of that battle moving on to the Main Heat. Winner: Julianna Jung Bottom two: Eva Roberts and Lorenzo Delgado Face-off Challenge: Eva and Lorenzo had 1 hour to take peanut butter cookies or chocolate chip cookies and turn them into a new dessert. Lorenzo got to pick due to his most recent win in any challenge and he picked peanut butter, so Eva got chocolate chip. Winner: Lorenzo Delgado Eliminated: Eva Roberts Main Heat: The bakers had 5 hours to make Christmas past, present, or future cakes with a style of icing signature to that time period: marzipan icing for past, buttercream icing for present, and mirror glaze icing for future. For winning the pre-heat, Julianna got to pick her time period and assign the others. She chose present, she gave past to Lorenzo, and she gave future to Megan. There is no mid-round twist. Winner of $25,000: Julianna Jung Eliminated: Lorenzo Delgado and Megan Rountree	

^Note 1: On December 20, prior to episode 8, there was a special hour-long episode titled Sweet Secrets. This was hosted by judges Duff Goldman, Nancy Fuller, and Carla Hall. They offered a behind-the-scenes look at the set where Holiday Baking Championship is filmed and discussed topics relating to this season such as: their favorite and least favorite desserts up to this point, the road to the finale with the finalists and their strengths/weaknesses, their relationships with each other on and off set, how they went about the whole elimination process of picking the least successful baker, and also showed a small sneak peek of the finale at the end.

=== Elimination Table^{2} ===
Place	Contestant	Episode									
Place	Contestant	1		2	3	4	5	6	7	8	
1	Julianna	IN	IN	IN	WIN	HIGH	LOW	HIGH	LOW	SAFE	WINNER‡
2	Lorenzo	IN	HIGH	WIN	IN‡	LOW	IN‡	IN	IN‡	LOW	RUNNER-UP
2	Megan	HIGH	WIN	IN	LOW	IN	IN	WIN‡	WIN	SAFE	RUNNER-UP
4	Eva	IN	IN	IN	IN	WIN	IN	LOW	HIGH	ELIM	
5	Lashonda	IN	LOW	IN	HIGH	IN	WIN	IN‡	ELIM		
6	Jon	LOW	IN	LOW	IN	IN	HIGH	ELIM			
7	Jamaal	IN	IN	IN‡	IN	IN‡	ELIM				
8	Kess	WIN	IN	IN	IN	ELIM					
9	Jeffrey	IN	IN	HIGH	ELIM						
10	Aubrey	IN	IN	ELIM							
11	Kristina	IN	ELIM								
12	Jonathan	ELIM									

(WINNER) This baker won the competition.
(RUNNER-UP) This baker was a finalist.
(WIN) This baker had the best dish in the challenge.
(IN) This baker did well enough to continue in the competition. Also included in the baker's rank in that round on the "Naughty or Nice list."
‡ This baker had the best dish in the pre-heat challenge and had an advantage in the main heat.
(SAFE) This baker did not need to complete in this round and was into the next round.
(HIGH) This baker had one of the best dishes.
(LOW) This baker was last to be called safe.
(ELIM) This baker was eliminated.

^Note 2: In season 7, there were some small deviations from the elimination pattern of previous seasons: in the first episode, there was an elimination in both the preheat and the main heat; and in the finale, there were four bakers instead of three and three rounds instead of two, with all four bakers completing in the preheat, after which the two lowest performing bakers in the preheat went head-to-head in an elimination challenge, and finally the remaining three bakers competed in the final round. Additionally bakers were ranked in every round, both preheat and main heat, of every episode on the "Naughty or Nice List"

== Season 8 ==
12 bakers enter the kitchen to compete for the $25,000 prize, a chance to be featured in Food Network magazine, and the title of Holiday Baking Champion. Duff Goldman, Nancy Fuller, and Carla Hall return to judge with Jesse Palmer hosting.

New this year: in the first 5 weeks, if any baker won both the Preheat and Main Heat in the same week, they would be immune from elimination the following week and Jesse Palmer sometimes gave the bakers non-spoken indicators of when time starts, such as when a Christmas tree on set lit up in episode 1 or he chopped a log in episode 2. The lowest ranked baker after each main heat will be eliminated from the competition. However, at the end of the first episode, there was a double elimination with two bakers being sent home.

=== Contestants ===
- 1st- Adam Monette, Culinary Arts Instructor from Saint Albans, VT
- 2/3rd - Sabrina Coombs, Executive Pastry Chef from Atlanta, GA
- 2/3rd- Jody O'Sullivan, Pastry Chef/Instructor from Boston, MA
- 4th- Jose Marchan, Pastry Chef from Cleveland, OH
- 5th - Richard Akers-Barrows, Pastry Cook from Dorchester, MA
- 6th - Marilyn Santos McNabb, Pastry Chef from Chicago, IL
- 7th - Neomie Eliezer, Head Pastry Chef from Cherry Hill, NJ
- 8th - Philippe Costa, Home Baker from Seaside, CA
- 9th - Jennifer Hood, Dietitian/Home Baker from Winston-Salem, NC
- 10th - Naomi Mwangi^{1}, Home Bakery Owner from McKinney, TX
- 11th - Shayla Daniels, Pastry Chef from Odessa, FL
- 12th - Grace Lapsys, Pastry Chef from Albuquerque, NM

^Note 1: In episode 1, it was revealed Naomi was approved to be on season 7, but due to a conflict schedule with becoming a naturalized citizen at the same time as when this show was filmed the previous year, she took care of that over being on the show then and was allowed to be on the show this year.

=== Episodes ===
Ep. #	Title	Original Air Date
1	"Falling Into Winter"	November 1, 2021
	Preliminary Heat: The bakers had 2 1/2 hours to capture fall turning to winter by making one dozen fall-themed doughnuts and one dozen winter-themed doughnuts. They picked their own flavors and decorations for them, with regards to the season each donut was representing. Winner: Adam Monette (His advantage was after time started, he could switch his type of cheese with any other baker. He picked havarti and switched with Jose for brie.) Main Heat: The bakers had 2 hours to make desserts featuring apple mixed with a cheese they chose when time started, but they were forbidden to make pies. Adam/Shayla picked brie. Jose/Marilyn picked havarti. Sabrina/Naomi picked gruyère. Philippe/Grace picked manchego. Jody/Richard picked cheddar. Jenn/Neomie picked gouda. Mid-round twist was to use honey in their apple/cheese desserts. Winner: Jose Marchan Eliminated: Grace Lapsys (first) and Shayla Daniels (second)	
2	"Yule Be Merry"	November 8, 2021
	Preliminary Heat: The bakers had 2 hours to turn 3 cocktail components (a liquor, a mixer, and a garnish) into a spirited holiday dessert and worked in pre-assigned teams: Jose & Naomi, Philippe & Jennifer, Jody & Sabrina, Adam & Neomie, and Richard & Marilyn. When time started, they chose 3 separate boxes (one for each component) with the ingredients for the 3 components they had to use. Richard & Marilyn got amaretto, dark chocolate ganache, and peanut brittle. Adam & Neomie got brandy, lemon curd, and salted caramel. Philippe & Jenn got Irish cream, coffee mousse, and almond toffee. Jose & Naomi got bourbon, orange curd, and tuile cookie. Jody & Sabrina got rum, pastry cream, and coconut crumble. Winner: Jose Marchan and Naomi Mwangi (Their advantage was after time started, both could swap out their flavor combination or yule log style with any other baker they wished. Jose swapped his traditional yule log with Adam for birch yule log. Naomi swapped her red velvet cranberry flavor with Sabrina for coconut macadamia flavor.) Main Heat: The bakers had 2 hours to make a yule log in one of 5 different styles (traditional yule log, 3 small yule logs, yule stump, sleek modern yule log, or birch yule log) with a specific flavor combination. Jose got white chocolate chai and birch. Adam got white chocolate pistachio and traditional. Naomi got coconut macadamia and 3 small yule logs. Sabrina got red velvet cranberry and sleek modern. Marilyn got cookies & cream and traditional. Philippe got chocolate peanut and sleek modern. Jody got cherry almond and yule stump. Jenn got salted chocolate pretzels and 3 small yule logs. Richard got chocolate peppermint and birch. Neomie got white chocolate gingersnap and yule stump. Mid-round twist was to make a woodland creature decoration made out of marzipan on top of their yule log. Winner: Adam Monette Eliminated: Naomi Mwangi	
3	"Attitude of Gratitude"	November 15, 2021
	Preliminary Heat: The bakers had 2 hours to use a canned fruit of their choice in holiday desserts. Richard got pear, Jenn got pineapple, Marilyn got plum, Jody got cherry, Adam got peach, Sabrina got rhubarb, Philippe got nectarine, Jose got mango, and Neomie got apricot. Winner: Richard Akers-Barrows (His advantage was he could claim a pie flavor that no one else could make. He chose apple.) Main Heat: The bakers had 2 hours to make Thanksgiving pies with an edible message as decoration on top of their pies representing a Thanksgiving wish they picked. Philippe got family, Marilyn got feast, Jody got harvest, Richard got giving, Sabrina got welcome, Adam got thankful, Jenn got home, Jose got gratitude, and Neomie got gather. Mid-round twist was they had to make ice cream from scratch to go with their pie. Winner: Jody O'Sullivan Eliminated: Jenn Hood	
4	"Best Thanksgiving Ever"	November 22, 2021
	Preliminary Heat: The bakers had 2 hours to make a holiday dessert using a Black Friday kitchen gadget represented on a gift card they picked. Sabrina picked juicer, Adam picked espresso machine, Jose picked grill pan, Philippe picked spiral cutter, Richard picked deep fryer, Jody picked sous vide machine, Neomie picked smoking gun, and Marilyn picked butter churner. Winner: Jody O'Sullivan (His advantage was he got to assign the teams for the Main Heat. He chose Adam as his partner and paired Jose with Richard, Marilyn with Neomie, and Sabrina with Philippe.) Main Heat: The bakers worked in teams and had 3 hours to fill cornucopia baskets with flavored holiday breads shaped like traditional cornucopia-filled items (like apples, grapes, or corn but they did not necessarily need to include such items in their breads). The best team's cornucopia would give both bakers safety from elimination for this week^{2}, but each baker's individual bread would determine if they stayed or were eliminated. Mid-round twist is the bakers had to make a dip or spread to serve with their breads. Winner: Jody O'Sullivan^{3} Eliminated: Philippe Costa	
5	"Gifts That Keep on Giving"	November 29, 2021
	Preliminary Heat: The bakers had 2 hours to honor the miracle of Hanukkah's one night of oil lasting eight nights by making decorated olive oil cakes in an assigned flavor combination. Neomie got lemon rosemary, Jody got pomegranate ginger, Sabrina got fig hazelnut, Jose got lemon blueberry, Adam got apple walnut, Marilyn got apricot almond, and Richard got date cardamom. Winner: Adam Monette (His advantage was he could take the last dreaded holiday dessert choice at the time or take one from another baker. He took Jody's initial choice of fruitcake.) Main Heat: The bakers had 2 hours to make a dessert chosen from dreaded holiday desserts. Adam got fruitcake, Marilyn got banana pudding, Richard got crème brûlée, Jose got decorated sugar cookies, Sabrina got whoopie pies, Neomie got bread pudding, and Jody got gingerbread. Mid-round twist is they had to make eggnog from scratch and serve it on the side with their dessert. Winner: Adam Monette^{4} Eliminated: Neomie Eliezer	
6	"Make New Friends, but Keep the Old"	December 6, 2021
	Preliminary Heat: The bakers had 90 minutes to use a vegan or a gluten-free dietary restriction chosen at random to create a holiday dessert. Marilyn, Richard, and Sabrina got vegan while Jody, Jose, and Adam got gluten-free. Winner: Marilyn Santos McNabb (Her advantage was she got to choose which vintage dessert she wanted and assigned the rest to the other bakers.) Main Heat: The bakers had 2 hours to turn vintage desserts into an updated holiday dessert. Marilyn picked raspberry orange gelatin mold for her advantage and then gave ambrosia salad to Adam, grasshopper pie to Jody, bourbon balls to Richard, pineapple upside-down cake to Jose, and cherry vanilla baked Alaska to Sabrina. Mid-round twist is the bakers had to incorporate a vintage ingredient, walnuts in syrup, somewhere in their dessert. Winner: Jose Marchan Eliminated: Marilyn Santos McNabb	
7	"Holidays in All the Ways"	December 13, 2021
	Preliminary Heat: The bakers had 90 minutes to make a dessert honoring the Kwanzaa feast using sweet potatoes and an assigned spice. Richard got allspice, Jody got ginger, Sabrina got cloves, Adam got cardamom, and Jose got mace. Winner: Sabrina Coombs (Her advantage was a 10-minute head start ahead of everyone else, so she had 2 hours and 10 minutes.) Main Heat: The bakers had 2 hours to make rectangular family holiday greeting card cakes. The flavors and decorating styles were left up to the bakers. Mid-round twist was to add a decorative border around the cake to frame it like a holiday greeting card. Winner: Sabrina Coombs Eliminated: Richard Akers-Barrows	
8	"Ultimate Holiday Party"	December 20, 2021
	Preliminary Heat: Winner: Jody O'Sullivan Bottom two:Sabrina Coombs and Jose Marchan Face-off Challenge: Make a dessert with a fun surprise inside. Jose made a cheesecake with a raspberry filling surprise. Sabrina made a dessert that included 5 chocolates with a surprise chocolate sauce. Winner: SABRINA COOMBS Eliminated:JOSE MARCHAN Main Heat: Make a holiday cake with a certain party theme. Adam got gift wrapping, Sabrina got formal, and Jody got tree trimming. The final twist was to add lights somewhere in their cakes. Winner of $25,000: ADAM MONETTE Eliminated:JODY O'SULLIVAN and SABRINA COOMBS	

^Note 2: Jody and Adam made the best cornucopia, so they were both safe from elimination this week, which was announced before Jody was announced in the top two.

^Note 3: Jody won immunity from elimination for week 5, by winning the Preheat and the Main Heat on week 4, making him the first baker to win immunity on Holiday Baking Championship.

^Note 4: Adam won immunity from elimination for week 6, by winning the Preheat and the Main Heat on week 5, making him the second baker to win immunity on Holiday Baking Championship.

=== Elimination Table^{2} ===
Place	Contestant	Episode								
Place	Contestant	1	2	3	4	5	6	7	8	
1	Adam	IN‡	WIN	IN	IN	WIN‡	HIGH	LOW	SAFE	WINNER
2	Sabrina	IN	IN	IN	IN	HIGH	IN	WIN‡	WIN	RUNNER-UP
2	Jody	IN	IN	WIN	WIN‡	IN	LOW	LOW	SAFE	RUNNER-UP‡
4	Jose	WIN	IN‡	IN	HIGH	LOW	WIN	LOW	ELIM	
5	Richard	IN	IN	IN‡	IN	IN	IN	ELIM		
6	Marilyn	IN	IN	HIGH	IN	IN	ELIM‡			
7	Neomie	IN	HIGH	LOW	LOW	ELIM				
8	Philippe	HIGH	IN	IN	ELIM					
9	Jenn	IN	LOW	ELIM						
10	Naomi	LOW	ELIM‡							
11	Shayla	ELIM								
12	Grace	ELIM								

(WINNER) This baker won the competition.
(RUNNER-UP) This baker was a finalist.
(ELIM) This baker was eliminated.
(IN) This baker never had the best dish or the worst.
(HIGH) This baker had one of the best dish.
(WIN) This baker had the best dish in the main challenge.
‡ This baker had the best dish in the pre-heat challenge.
(LOW) This baker was last to be called safe.

== Season 9 ==
=== Contestants ===
- 1st- Dru Tevis, Corporate Pastry Chef from Rehoboth Beach, DE
- 2nd- Aishia Martinez, Pastry Cook from Hoboken, New Jersey
- 3rd/4th-Aaron Davis, Cake Decorator from Surprise, AZ
- 3rd/4th- Jessica Wang, Pastry Food Stylist from Los Angeles, CA
- 5th- Bill Makin, Home Baker from Brooklyn, NY
- 6th- Zakiya Newton, Pastry Chef and Home Bakery Owner from Gotha, FL
- 7th-Harshal Naik, Pastry Chef from Bedford, PA
- 8th-Kristen Weidlein, Executive Pastry Chef from Staten Island, NY
- 9th- Christine Herelle-Lewis, French Pastry Chef from New York, NY
- 10th- Sumera Syed, Home Baker Entrepreneur from Dallas, TX
- 11th- Antoine Hopkins, Pastry Chef from Philadelphia, PA
- 12th -RaChelle Hubsmith, Home Baker from Salt Lake City, UT

=== Episodes ===
Ep. #	Title	Original Air Date
1	"First Snow"	November 7, 2022
	Preliminary Heat: The bakers had 2 hours to create a non-traditional Pavlova that incorporates a fun fall flavor and includes color, in a wreathe shape. Sumera got cranberries. Aishia got persimmon. Aaron got apple. Kristen got pear. RaChelle got pomegranate. Christine got coconut. Bill got date. Dru got pumpkin. Jessica got maple. Harshal got fig. Antoine got sweet potato. Zakiya got kumquat. Winner: Aishia Martinez (Her Main Heat advantage was to be able to switch her flavor with someone else if she did not like her assigned flavor. She kept candy-cane.) Main Heat: The bakers were split up into two teams—Team Pie and Team Cake—going head-to-head with flavor. The team that had the most wins would be awarded with immunity. As there was a tie 3 to 3, the overall best bite/dish provided immunity to the team that baker was on. Jessica won best bite/dish, giving immunity to Team Pie. The twist was to make snowflake cookies. Team Pie: Aishia (candy-cane), Jessica (pecan), Antoine (butterscotch), Dru (eggnog), Zakiya (apple), Sumera (pumpkin) Team Cake: Harshal (candy-cane), RaChelle (eggnog), Bill (butterscotch), Christine (apple), Aaron (pecan), Kristen (pumpkin) Winner: Jessica Wang Eliminated: RaChelle Hubsmith	
2	"Getting Ready for Thanksgiving"	November 14, 2022
	Preliminary Heat: After a grocery delivery gone wrong, Jesse Palmer tasks the bakers with creating a dessert featuring an ingredient from Thanksgiving dinner. Winner: Aaron Davis (His Main Heat advantage was to be able to switch his mousse cake with any other baker's chosen dessert dish. He chose to keep his original dish.) Main Heat: The competitors go beyond cookies to give the jolly gingerbread man a makeover that will impress the judges. Zakiya and Antoine got trifle. Christine, Aaron, and Harshal got mousse cake. Aishia and Jessica got Swiss roll. Sumera and Bill got cheesecake. Kristen and Dru got tiramisu. The twist was to make gingerbread cookies to accompany their gingerbread-inspired dessert. Winner: Dru Tevis Eliminated: Antoine Hopkins	
3	"Feeling Sweet and Thankful"	November 21, 2022
	Preliminary Heat: Jesse has the bakers make a Thanksgiving dessert inspired by different methods of cooking turkey. The ways were bacon-wrapped (Kristen and Jessica), brined (Dru and Bill), deep-fried (Aishia and Zakiya), roasted (Aaron and Harshal), and smoked (Sumera and Christine). Winner: Bill Makin (His Main Heat advantage was getting to choose his teammate and theme; he selected Aaron and Herbal/Buttery/Bright). Main Heat: The bakers had two hours working in pairs to create a flight of three different pies, two as individuals and one a collaboration, taking the judges on a flavor trio progression. The teams were Bill and Aaron who picked herbal/buttery/bright, then Sumera and Aishia got cool/fiery/rich, Christine and Jessica got sharp/earthy/creamy, Kristen and Zakiya warm/velvety/citrus, and Dru and Harshal got floral/crisp/silky. The mid-bake twist was to add alcohol. Winner:Kristen Weidlein and Zakiya Newton Eliminated: Sumera Syed	
4	"Dining Out For the Holidays"	November 28, 2022
	Preliminary Heat:The holidays are a season for indulgence, so host Jesse Palmer asks the bakers to turn classic steakhouse desserts into decadent holiday treats. Aishia got bananas foster. Christine got coconut cake. Kristen got key lime pie. Dru got apple tarte tatin. Bill got ice cream brownie sundae. Aaron got mile high pie. Jessica got mile high cake. Zakiya got molten lava cake. Harshal got creme brûlée. Winner: Jessica Wang (Her Main Heat advantage was that she didn't have to do the mid-bake twist, though she opted to do it anyway.) Main Heat:The competitors were tasked with impressing the judges by transforming a traditional steakhouse icon (Baked Alaska) into a tasty Christmas tree, which they were also required to flambé in front of judges. Each baker was assigned specific flavors to incorporate. Kristen got cranberry and ginger; Bill got white chocolate and chia; Harshal got eggnog and coffee; Jessica got chocolate and coconut; Christine got chocolate and mint; Dru got mocha and chocolate; Aishia got cherry and pistachio; Zakiya got chocolate and orange; and Aaron got chestnut and caramel. The twist was to make an edible Christmas tree topper for their dessert. Winner: Aishia Martinez Eliminated: Christine Herelle-Lewis	
5	"Holiday Movie Magic"	December 5, 2022
	Preliminary Heat:The bakers work in pairs to create three holiday English afternoon tea party sweet treats. The teams were Jessica and Zakiya, Kristen and Harshal, Dru and Aaron, and Bill and Aishia. Winner: Aishia Martinez and Bill Makin (their advantage was to pick their theme in the Main Heat) Main Heat: Bakers had to create desserts inspired by romcom movie themes. The twist was to use popcorn somewhere in their desserts. Winner: Dru Tevis Eliminated: Kristen Weidlein	
6	"The World of Holidays!"	December 5, 2022
	Preliminary Heat: Bakers had to create any dessert using fresh corn. Winner: Bill Makin (Main Heat advantage was his choice of international desserts). Main Heat: Bakers had to put their own personal flare into an international dessert. The twist was to make mulled wine from scratch and use it somewhere in their dessert. Winner: Dru Tevis (Canadian Tarte au Sucre, or Sugar Pie) Eliminated: Harshal Naik	
7	Holiday Rush	December 12, 2022
	Preliminary Heat: The bakers Hanukkah challenge was to make Jewish ugly sweaters carved holiday cakes using various flavors of halvah. Aishia and Jessica got pistachio, Zakiya and Dru got chocolate, Bill and Aaron got vanilla. Winner: Dru Tevis (His advantage was that he could sit out the ReHeat challenge and go right to the Main Heat, or he could participate and potentially get a second advantage in the Main Heat. He decided to participate.) ReHeat: Jesse threw the bakers a curveball! There were three challenges during this week. Bakers had 60 minutes to take store-bought birthday cakes and make a holiday rush cake, to include new fillings, frostings and decoration. There was no baking, just transforming. Cake flavors are chocolate, vanilla, and confetti. Aaron and Zakiya got confetti, Dru and Aisha got vanilla, Bill and Jessica got chocolate. Winner: Jessica Wang (Her Main Heat advantage was a choice between exclusive use of all white decorations—only she would be able to use them—or she could choose that nobody else has to do the twist, which is to make a big top hat for their snowmen. She chose the latter.) Main Heat: The bakers had to make a croquembouche snowman. The mid-bake twist was to make a top hat for their snowman. Jessica used her advantage from the ReHeat to help the other competitors so no one had to do it. Winner: Bill Makin Eliminated : Zakiya Newton	
8	Happy Holidays Getaway	December 19, 2022
	Preliminary Heat: The bakers had two hours to make a holiday tart decorated with succulents, themed around a vacation to the desert. Winner: Dru won, gaining the advantage of assigning the bakers' theme bakes in the final challenge. Elimination Challenge: As the lowest ranked in the Preliminary Heat, Bill and Jessica entered an elimination bake off. They had to make cream tarts themed around a holiday ski trip. Eliminated : Bill Main Heat: For the first time in Holiday Baking Championship history, four finalists were competing in the final Main Heat. The finalists were given five hours to make a Christmas holiday dream vacation cake featuring an assigned destination location and a type of cookie. Dru used his Preliminary Heat advantage to first choose the Swiss Alps with Swedish butter cookies, then assigned the other bakers, giving Jessica Paris with macarons, Aisha the Caribbean with spice cookies, and Aaron New York City with black and white cookies. Winner: Dru	

=== Elimination Table ===
Place	Contestant	Episode								
Place	Contestant	1	2	3	4	5	6	7	8	
1	Dru	IN	WIN	IN	HIGH	WIN	WIN	LOW	WIN	WINNER
2	Aishia	IN‡	IN	IN	WIN	HIGH‡	IN	HIGH	IN	RUNNER-UP
3	Aaron	IN	HIGH‡	IN	IN	IN	IN	IN	IN	FINALIST
3	Jessica	WIN	IN	LOW	IN‡	LOW	IN	IN‡	LOW	FINALIST
5	Bill	IN	IN	IN‡	IN	IN‡	LOW‡	WIN	ELIM	
6	Zakiya	IN	IN	WIN	IN	IN	IN	ELIM		
7	Harshal	HIGH	IN	IN	IN	IN	ELIM			
8	Kristen	IN	LOW	WIN	LOW	ELIM				
9	Christine	LOW	IN	IN	ELIM					
10	Sumera	IN	IN	ELIM						
11	Antoine	IN	ELIM							
12	RaChelle	ELIM								

(WINNER) This baker won the competition.
(RUNNER-UP) This baker was a finalist.
(ELIM) This baker was eliminated.
(IN) This baker did not have the best dish or the worst dish.
(HIGH) This baker had one of the best dishes.
(WIN) This baker had the best dish in the main challenge.
‡ This baker had the best dish in the pre-heat challenge.
(LOW) This baker was last to be called safe.

== Season 10 ==
=== Contestants ===
- 1st- Ashley Landerman, Executive Bakery Owner from New Braunfels, Texas
- 2/3/4th- Kevin Conniff, Pastry Chef from Alberta, Canada
- 2/3/4th- Thoa Nguyen, Bakery Owner from Englewood, Colorado
- 2/3/4th- Justine Rota, Home Bakery Owner from Whitman, Massachusetts
- 5th- Sharrod Mangum, Executive Pastry Chef from Atlanta, Georgia
- 6th- Javier Trujillo, Pastry Chef from Chicago, Illinois
- 7th- Josh Juarez, Hotel Banquet Cook from Austin, Texas
- 8th-Greg Ballenger, Home Cook from Dallas, Texas
- 9th-Bert Alvarado, Pastry Chef from Las Vegas, Nevada
- 10th- Jennifer Carey, Bakery Owner from Brooklyn, New York
- 11th- Alex Jacks, Home Baker from Portland, Oregon
- 12th- Ali Kenis, Bakery Owner from Ventura, California

=== Episodes ===
Ep. #	Title	Original Air Date
1	"Season's Best"	November 6, 2023
	Preliminary Heat: The 12 new bakers had 2 hours to make different coffee drink flavored cinnamon rolls to present to Nancy Fuller, Duff Goldman, and Carla Hall. Winner: Ashley Landerman (Her advantage was to be able to choose a cake flavor no one else could use. She chose pumpkin.) Main Heat: The bakers were tasked to create Thanksgiving Swiss rolls. Since pumpkin was off the table, many bakers, including Alex, Sharrod, and Kevin chose to use sweet potato. The twist was to make homemade toffee from scratch, then use it somewhere in their desserts. Surprisingly everyone excelled with the toffee. Winner: Kevin Conniff Eliminated: Ali Kenis	
2	"Can't Wait for Turkey Day"	November 13, 2023
	Preliminary Heat: The 11 bakers were asked to create turkey dome desserts for an advantage in the main heat. Winner: Javier Trujillo (His advantage was to choose the dessert everyone had to make. It was either mousse cake or opera cake. He chose opera cakes.) Main Heat: The bakers were asked to make Thanksgiving Day centerpiece cakes that looked like Thanksgiving tables. The twist was to add sage somewhere in their cakes. Winner: Justine Rota Eliminated: Alex Jacks	
3	"Hallmarks of Thanksgiving"	November 20, 2023
	Preliminary Heat: The 10 bakers were asked to create 7 layer desserts (inspired by Thanksgiving football) for an advantage in the main heat. Winner: Ashley Landerman with a 7 layer tiramisu. Her advantage was to choose her pie flavour and the person she would go head-to-head against. Main Heat: The bakers had to make half-pies going head-to-head against another baker with the same flavour. The judges would taste blindly. The winner of each round would be safe and the loser would potentially be up for elimination. The twist was that they had to use cheese. Winner: Kevin Conniff Eliminated: Jennifer Carey	
4	"Holiday Whimsy"	November 27, 2023
	Preliminary Heat: The 9 bakers were asked to create whimsical Mount Blanc desserts. Winner: Thoa Nguyen. Her advantage was to use pre-made marshmallow cream in the main heat. Main Heat: The bakers had to make upside down cakes: one tier cakes decorated on the top and then flipped upside down and suspended on a piece of glass. They had to create a design that would look good smushed! The twist was that they had to make their own marshmallow to use in the cake. Winner: Josh Juarez Eliminated: Bert Alvarado	
5	"Holiday Beauty"	December 4, 2023
	Preliminary Heat: The 8 bakers were asked to create mini tart mosaics in teams of 2. Winners: Kevin Conniff and Javier Trujillo with a snowman mosaic. Their advantage was they did not have to make a cookie gift tag twist in the main heat. Main Heat: The bakers had to make double barrel cakes to look like a roll of wrapping paper. The twist was that they had to make a gift tag cookie to go on top. Winner: Javier Trujillo Eliminated: Greg Ballenger	
6	"Holiday Imagination"	December 4, 2023
	Preliminary Heat: The 7 bakers were asked to make a dessert inspired by latkes: it had to be fried, include some kind of potato, and have either apple or sour cream. Winner: Josh Juarez. His advantage was to choose the flavour twist for the main heat: eggnog or mulled wine. He picked eggnog. Main Heat: The bakers had to make a holiday bar dessert and decorate it like a letter board with a holiday pun. The twist was to make and include eggnog. Winner: Javier Trujillo Eliminated: Josh Juarez	
7	"Reasons for the Season"	December 11, 2023
	Preliminary Heat: The 6 bakers had to make desserts using plantains. Kevin got Napoleon, Justine got upside-down cake, Thoa got whoopie pie, Sharrod got brownie sundae, Javier got crumble, and Ashley got tart tatin. Winner: Justine Rota won the advantage to pick her teammates. She chose Kevin and Javier. Team Heat: In a surprise extra challenge, the bakers were split into two teams where they had to make dessert ornaments. Winners: Thoa Nguyen, Ashley Landerman and Sharrod Mangum. Their advantage was a 10-minute head start. Main Heat: The bakers had to make blitz puff pastry Christmas tree pull-aparts for Duff, Nancy and Carla. The twist was to add a sauce. Winner: Thoa Nguyen Eliminated: Javier Trujillo	
8	"Holiday Gifts Galore"	December 18, 2023
	Preliminary Heat: The bakers had to make macaron holiday wreaths. Winner: Thoa Elimination Challenge: Sharrod and Justine were the lowest ranked in the Pre-Heat and had to compete to stay in the competition. They had to make stocking éclairs and use two of the judges' favorite holiday flavors. They had to choose from sweet potato, cranberry, and bourbon; both bakers chose sweet potato and bourbon. Eliminated: Sharrod Main Heat: The remaining four bakers had to make a holiday village train stop cake that a train would actually run through. Since Thoa won the first challenge, she got to pick the theme of each cake. She took the penguin party for herself and gave Santa's elf village to Justine, teddy bears to Ashley, and gnomes to Kevin. Winner: Ashley	

=== Elimination Table ===
Place	Contestant	Episode								
Place	Contestant	1	2	3	4	5	6	7	8	
1	Ashley	IN‡	IN	HIGH‡	IN	LOW	LOW	IN^{1}	IN	WINNER
2	Thoa	LOW	IN	IN	HIGH‡	HIGH	IN	WIN^{1}	IN‡	Runners-up
2	Justine	IN	WIN	LOW	IN	IN	HIGH	HIGH‡	RISK^{2}	Runners-up
2	Kevin	WIN	IN	WIN	IN	IN‡	IN	IN	IN	Runners-up
5	Sharrod	IN	IN	IN	IN	IN	IN	LOW^{1}	ELIM^{2}	
6	Javier	IN	HIGH‡	IN	IN	WIN‡	WIN	ELIM		
7	Josh	IN	IN	IN	WIN	IN	ELIM‡			
8	Greg	HIGH	IN	IN	LOW	ELIM				
9	Bert	IN	IN	IN	ELIM					
10	Jennifer	IN	LOW	ELIM						
11	Alex	IN	ELIM							
12	Ali	ELIM								

‡ This baker had the best dish in the preheat challenge.
^{1} These bakers won the team challenge in episode 7.
^{2} These bakers were ranked lowest in the preheat and competed in an elimination bake-off.

== Season 11 ==
Season 11 is themed around holiday parties and is hosted by Jesse Palmer with Nancy Fuller, Duff Goldman, and Carla Hall as judges. This season, bakers receive a cash bonus of $1,000 each time they win a pre-heat.

=== Contestants ===
- 1st - Steven Levitt, Self taught baker from Aurora, Ontario
- 2/3/4th - Natasha Aschoff, Bakery Owner from Plymouth, Massachusetts
- 2/3/4th - Rafi Dekrmnjian, Bakery Owner from Northridge, California
- 2/3/4th - Rolf Runkel, Pastry Chef Instructor from Calgary, Alberta
- 5th - Jer Barrios, Pastry Chef from Carson City, Nevada
- 6th - Courtney Reed, Pastry Chef from Elizabeth, New Jersey
- 7th - Megan Knudsvig, Home baker from Chehalis, Washington
- 8th - Andre Ward, Culinary Instructor from Jacksonville, Florida
- 9th - Delna Patel, Chocolatier and Bakery Owner from Toronto, Ontario
- 10th - Karen Belton, Home Bakery Owner from Riverside, California
- 11th - Jonathan Cedrone, Custom cake bakery head baker from Philadelphia, Pennsylvania
- 12th - Julian Coronado, Pastry Chef from Fowler, California

=== Episodes ===
Episodes
No. in season	Title	Original release date
1	"Holiday Open House"	November 4, 2024
Pre-Heat: Inspired by an open house party's cheese ball appetizer, the bakers were given two hours to make desserts using a randomly assigned cheese and accompanying nuts or dried fruit. Winner: Andre Ward Main Heat: The bakers had two and half hours to make a dessert incorporating the flavors of their selected variety of chocolate bark. Winner: Rafi Dekrmnjian Eliminated: Julian Coronado
2	"Thanksgiving Family Feast"	November 11, 2024
Pre-Heat: The bakers had two hours to make over-the-top cupcakes for the kids' table at Thanksgiving dinner. This heat featured guest judges: past contestants from Kids Baking Championship Matt Azuma (season 5) and Summer Haque (season 10). Winner: Courtney Reed Main Heat: The bakers were given two and a half hours to make Thanksgiving pies topped with 3D decorations. Winner: Megan Knudsvig Eliminated: Jonathan Cedrone
3	"Friendsgiving"	November 18, 2024
Pre-Heat: To celebrate Friendsgiving, the bakers had two hours to make "flavor friends" desserts featuring assigned pairs of flavors. Winner: Rolf Runkel Main Heat: The competitors were grouped into Team Apple and Team Pumpkin. Each team baked five assigned desserts (tiramisu, napoleon, cheesecake, pavlova, and Swiss roll) with their featured ingredient. Desserts of the same type were judged in head-to-head matchups, and the team with the most wins was given safety from elimination. Winner: Andre Ward (Team Pumpkin) was the individual winner. However, Team Apple (Megan, Delna, Steven, Rafi, and Natasha) won the team competition. Eliminated: Karen Belton
4	"Old-Fashioned Christmas Party"	November 18, 2024
Pre-Heat: In an episode themed around Victorian era Christmas, the bakers were given two hours to make desserts featuring fruitcake blend, a mixture of dried fruit soaked in liquor and spices. Winner: Courtney Reed Main Heat: The bakers were given two and a half hours to make ornately decorated Lambeth cakes, also known as over-piped or Victorian cakes. Each competitor chose from assigned color palettes for their frosting. Winner: Natasha Aschoff Eliminated: Delna Patel
5	"Cookie Exchange Party"	November 25, 2024
Pre-Heat: The eight competitors had 90 minutes to make holiday cookies, which the judges sampled in a blind tasting. The bakers also tasted and voted on all their opponents' cookies, with the bonus cash prize being split between the judges' favorite and the bakers' favorite. Winner: Natasha won as the judges' choice, while Rolf won the bakers' choice. Main Heat: The bakers were given two hours to make cookie cakes with two different flavors of large cookies stacked in four layers. Winner: Rolf Runkel Eliminated: Andre Ward
6	"Office Christmas Party"	December 2, 2024
Pre-Heat: The bakers were given 90 minutes to make desserts decorated with Rolo candies and featuring caramel and chocolate. Winner: Jer Barrios Main Heat: Inspired by an ice luge at an office holiday party, the bakers had two hours to make boozy trifles with an assigned spirit which they selected. For the first time this season, there was a mid-round twist: the bakers had to add a decoration shaped like a desk accessory that represented their personality. Winner: Steven Levitt Eliminated: Megan Knudsvig
7	"Holiday Pajama Party"	December 9, 2024
Pre-Heat: The competitors had two hours to make large-scale macarons shaped like footie pajamas. Winner: Rolf Runkel won the pre-heat. Instead of bonus cash, he received the strategic advantage to assign all teams in the next challenge. "Tree Heat": In an additional challenge inspired by Christmas tree decorating, the bakers were grouped into teams of two to make a garland-shaped display of cream puffs. Winner: The team of Steven Levitt and Rafi Dekrmnjian won. They were rewarded with the best placement in the gift exchange in the main heat. Main Heat: The bakers had two and a half hours to make an assigned cake type (entremet, charlotte royale, or dacquoise) with a required flavor which they selected through a white elephant gift exchange. The twist required the addition of a cuddle toy decoration. Winner: Jer Barrios Eliminated: Courtney Reed
8	"Gingerbread House Party"	December 16, 2024
Pre-Heat: The bakers had two hours to make desserts that featured the appearance and flavor of a chosen type of candy. Winner: Rolf Runkel won, going directly into the final heat. "Use Your Noggin" Heat: The four competitors who did not win the pre-heat competed in an elimination challenge. They had 90 minutes to make a dessert featuring a selected variety of flavored eggnog. Eliminated: Jer Barrios Main Heat: The finalists had five hours to make a gingerbread house cake in one of four randomly selected architectural styles: Rafi had Tudor house, Steven had cozy cottage, Natasha had castle, and Rolf had modern house. Winner: Steven Levitt

=== Elimination Table ===
Place	Contestant	Episode								
Place	Contestant	1	2	3	4	5	6	7	8	
1	Steven	IN	IN	WIN	IN	LOW	WIN	IN^{1}	IN	WINNER
2	Natasha	IN	HIGH	HIGH	WIN	IN‡	IN	LOW	IN	Runners-up
2	Rafi	WIN	IN	WIN	HIGH	IN	IN	IN^{1}	IN	Runners-up
2	Rolf	IN	IN	IN‡	IN	WIN‡	LOW	HIGH‡	SAFE‡	Runners-up
5	Jer	IN	IN	IN	LOW	IN	HIGH‡	WIN	ELIM	
6	Courtney	HIGH	IN‡	LOW	IN‡	IN	IN	ELIM		
7	Megan	IN	WIN	WIN	IN	HIGH	ELIM			
8	Andre	IN‡	IN	WIN	IN	ELIM				
9	Delna	LOW	IN	WIN	ELIM					
10	Karen	IN	LOW	ELIM						
11	Jonathan	LOW	ELIM							
12	Julian	ELIM								

(WINNER) This baker won the competition.
(RUNNER-UP) This baker was a finalist.
(ELIM) This baker was eliminated.
(HIGH) This baker had one of the highest-ranked dishes in the main heat.
(LOW) This baker had one of the lowest-ranked dishes in the main heat.
(WIN) This baker had the best dish in the main heat.
(WIN) The baker won as part of a team in the main heat.
(SAFE) This baker was exempt from an elimination challenge due to winning a preheat.
‡ This baker had the best dish in the preheat challenge.
^{1} These bakers were the winning team of the "Tree Heat" challenge in episode 7.

== Season 12 ==
Season twelve is themed around "Naughty vs. Nice" with the set built as a holiday village. The season is hosted by Jesse Palmer with the judging panel of Nancy Fuller, Duff Goldman, and Kardea Brown (replacing Carla Hall). For the first time, the bakers are grouped into two competing teams from the start of the competition.

=== Contestants ===
- 1st - Charles Zimmerman, Pastry Chef from Charlottesville, Virginia
- 2/3/4th - Ashleigh Wright, Executive Pastry Chef from Frisco, Texas
- 2/3/4th -Tarek Husseini, (Note: Tarek previously competed on Kids Baking Championship season 7 at age 13, where he was 2nd/3rd runner-up in the finale.) Home Baker from St. Louis, Missouri
- 2/3/4th -Chase Maus, Baker from Santa Fe, New Mexico
- 5th - Nico Alkalay, Bakery Owner from Denver, Colorado
- 6th - Jean Carlos, Pastry Chef from Orlando, Florida
- 7th - Alyx Abreu, Pastry Chef from New Orleans, Louisiana
- 8th - Camrey Smith, Bakery Owner from Detroit, Michigan
- 9th - Erin Michelle Luttrell, Pastry consultant from Kansas City, Missouri
- 10th - Violet Zoner, Pastry student from Ithaca, New York
- 11th - Daniel Gray, Bakery Owner from High Point, North Carolina
- 12th - Jeanna 'Gia' Barnes, Bakery Owner from Troy, Alabama

=== Episodes ===
Episodes
No. in season	Title	Original release date
1	"Welcome to the Holiday Village"	November 3, 2025
Preheat: The competitors were assigned into two teams of six: Team Naughty and Team Nice. In their first challenge, bakers individually made desserts around a theme: Team Nice was assigned the theme "Warm & Toasty", while Team Naughty got "Chill & Frosty". Ashleigh won the preheat, giving Team Naughty an advantage, which they used to ban Team Nice from using chocolate in the Main Heat. Main Heat: Both teams designed a holiday village display containing a dessert made by each baker and pre-made gingerbread houses which they decorated. Chase's dessert won the main heat, giving immunity to Team Nice. Gia was eliminated.
2	"Holiday Cheer"	November 10, 2025
Preheat: Team Naughty was tasked with making desserts with the flavors of assigned holiday cocktails, while Team Nice were assigned flavors from mocktails. Nico won the challenge, gaining an advantage for Team Naughty. Main Heat: The teams made meringue-based desserts, with Team Nice given the theme "cheery" and Team Naughty the theme "cheeky". For their advantage from the preheat, Team Naughty received fresh, pre-separated egg whites, which saved time in their meringue preparation. However Alyx won the challenge, giving immunity to Team Nice. From Team Naughty, Daniel was eliminated.
3	"Crafting Holiday Magic"	November 17, 2025
This episode contained only one challenge; there was no preheat. Main Heat: The bakers made over-the-top holiday wreath desserts. They also had to express their team's Naughty or Nice theme through decoration or flavor. As winners of the previous main heat, Team Nice chose an advantage: a selection of extra decorating tools. Ashleigh won for the best dish, gaining immunity for Team Naughty. Violet was eliminated.
4	"Pies and Shine"	November 24, 2025
Main Heat: In the only challenge of this episode, the bakers each had to make two identical holiday pies. After baking, in a surprise twist, each team had to taste their team's pies and select only two to present to the judges. Team Nice chose Chase and Jean Carlos, while Team Naughty chose Tarek and Charles. Tarek was the winner, gaining immunity for Team Naughty. Because the judges did not taste all the pies, Team Nice had to vote by secret ballot to decide which of their bakers would be eliminated. Erin was eliminated.
5	"Snowed in Sweets"	December 1, 2025
As winners of the previous heat, Team Naughty gained the advantage to steal a member from Team Nice; they chose Alyx. Main Heat: In the only challenge of the episode, Jesse asked the bakers to make desserts themed around snow day activities, which were randomly selected from packages. Charles won the challenge, gaining immunity for Team Naughty. Camrey was eliminated.
6	"Jingle Mingle"	December 8, 2025
Main Heat: To celebrate Chrismukkah (a blend of Christmas and Hanukkah), the bakers were asked to make a platter of Christmas cookies, sufganiyot, and rugelach. For winning the last challenge, Team Naughty gained the advantage to use proof boxes to aid the proofing of their sufganiyot dough. The platters were judged blindly. Chase won, giving immunity to Team Nice. Alyx was the lowest ranked of Team Naughty and was eliminated.
7	"Retro Christmas"	December 15, 2025
Entering the semifinals, the teams were dissolved, making this an individual competition. For this episode, Halloween Baking Championship judge Stephanie Boswell stood in for Duff Goldman, who was absent due to sickness. Preheat: The bakers made assigned retro desserts. As the winner of the last challenge, Chase chose grasshopper torte and assigned the other recipes: champagne cake, pineapple upside down cake, coconut cake, bread pudding with brandy sauce, and German chocolate cake. Ashleigh won, gaining the advantage to advance directly into the finals if she won the Chance Heat. Chance Heat: The bakers had to make desserts with a gelatin layer in an assigned flavor which they picked. Ashleigh won, gaining a direct pass into the finals. Main Heat: The bakers made desserts using retro packaged pie fillings. As the runner up in the last challenge, Charles gained the advantage to assign everyone's required ingredient. Tarek won. Jean Carlos was eliminated.
8	"Naughty & Nice Christmas"	December 22, 2025
For this episode, Halloween Baking Championship judge Zac Young stood in for Duff Goldman. Preheat: The bakers made "naughty elf" themed desserts with difficult required ingredients. In an auction, Charles traded 20 minutes of his own baking time to assign the ingredients to all bakers. Chase won, gaining the advantage to skip the next heat. Hot Hot Heat: The bakers made "nice" hot cocoa themed desserts. Ashleigh won. Nico was eliminated. Main Heat: In the final challenge, the bakers had five hours to make a multi-tiered cake with assigned naughty vs. nice themes. As the winner of the previous heat, Ashleigh could assign all themes; she chose "Naughty Nutcracker vs. Sugar Plum Fairy". Chase got "Scrooge vs. Santa", Charles got "coal vs. holiday gifts", and Tarek got "naughty reindeer vs. nice reindeer". Charles won the championship with a coal mine and holiday gifts themed maple pecan cake with pecan praline.

=== Elimination Table ===
Place	Contestant	Team	Episode								
Place	Contestant	Team	1	2	3	4	5	6	7	8	
1	Charles	Naughty	IN	IN	IMM	IMM	WIN	IN	HIGH	IN	WINNER
2	Ashleigh	Naughty	HIGH‡	IN	WIN	IMM	IMM	LOW	SAFE‡ (Note: In episode 7, Ashleigh won the Chance Heat, bypassing the Main Heat and going directly into the finals.)	IN (Note: In episode 8, Ashleigh won the Hot Hot Heat, gaining an advantage in the Main Heat.)	Runners-up
2	Chase	Nice	WIN	IMM	LOW	HIGH	HIGH	WIN	IN	SAFE‡	Runners-up
2	Tarek	Naughty	LOW	LOW	IMM	WIN	IMM	IN	WIN	IN	Runners-up
5	Nico	Naughty	IN	HIGH‡	IMM	IMM	IMM	HIGH	LOW	ELIM	
6	Jean Carlos	Nice	IMM	IMM	IN	IN	LOW	IMM	ELIM		
7	Alyx	Naughty (Note: Alyx began on Team Nice, but was recruited to Team Naughty in episode 5.)	IMM	WIN	HIGH	LOW	IMM	ELIM			
8	Camrey	Nice	IMM	IMM	IN	LOW	ELIM				
9	Erin	Nice	IMM	IMM	IN	ELIM					
10	Violet	Nice	IMM	IMM	ELIM						
11	Daniel	Naughty	IN	ELIM							
12	Gia	Naughty	ELIM								

(WINNER) This baker won the competition.
(RUNNER-UP) This baker was a finalist.
(ELIM) This baker was eliminated.
(HIGH) This baker had one of the highest-ranked dishes in the main heat.
(LOW) This baker had one of the lowest-ranked dishes in the main heat.
(WIN) This baker had the best dish in the main heat.
(IMM) This baker was immune from elimination due to being on the winning team in the main heat.
(SAFE) This baker bypassed an elimination challenge due to winning a previous heat.
‡ This baker had the best dish in the preheat challenge.

== Season 13 ==
Season thirteen is themed around Santa's Workshop and the Reindeer Crew vs. Elf Squad. The season is hosted by Jesse Palmer with the judging panel of Kardea Brown, Duff Goldman, and Molly Yeh (replacing Nancy Fuller).

=== Contestants ===
- Andy de la Cruz, Pastry Chef from West Covina, California
- Audri Fleming, Bakery Owner from Dallas, Texas
- Christina Schumacher, Pastry Sous Chef from Shelton, Connecticut
- Dyana O'Brien, Bakery Owner from Sacramento, California
- Hailey Lemberger, Pastry Cook from Washington, D.C.
- Isabell Manibusan, Pastry Chef Consultant from Los Angeles, California
- Jeremy "JerBear" Intille, Executive Pastry Chef from Philadelphia, Pennsylvania
- Jessie Lopez, Pastry Chef Instructor from Houston, Texas
- Montanna Brumfield, Private Event Executive Chef from Palm Coast, Florida
- 10th - Fin Belson, Pastry Cook from Newton, Massachusetts
- 11th - Curtis Lamar Scott, Executive Pastry Chef from Atlanta, Georgia
- 12th - Jean Andrew, Home Bakery Owner from Logan, Utah

=== Episodes ===
Episodes
No. in season	Title	Original release date
1	"Welcome to Santa's Workshop"	November 2, 2026
Preheat: Twelve contestants were grouped into two teams: the Elf Squad and Reindeer Crew. The bakers were asked to make "employee profile" desserts illustrating their personal holiday favorites. Elf Squad were the winners. Main Heat: The bakers made cakes inspired by stained glass. For winning the Preheat, the Elf Squad gained use of extra supplies for making stained glass decor. The Reindeer Crew won, gaining immunity from elimination, and Andy was named the overall winner. Jean was eliminated.
2	"The Time of Your Life"	November 9, 2026
Preheat: The teams were asked to incorporate mint into their desserts. Reindeer Crew were the winners. Main Heat: The teams made red velvet desserts inspired by Santa's suit, with each baker using a selected dessert type and fabric pattern. For winning the Preheat, the Reindeer Crew forced the Elf Squad to incorporate chestnuts into their desserts. However, The Elf Squad won, gaining immunity from elimination, and an advantage of thirty minutes of extra time, with each member receiving three 10-minute increments to use throughout the whole season. Jessie was named the winner. Curtis was eliminated.
3	"Snow Business"	November 16, 2026
Main Heat: The teams were dissolved; the competition became individual from this point forward. The bakers were asked to make trifles with a snow globe theme depicting a personal holiday memory. In a twist, they had to add an edible Christmas tree decoration. Isabell was the winner. Fin was eliminated.

=== Elimination Table ===
Place	Contestant	Team	Episode		
Place	Contestant	Team	1	2	3
	Andy	Reindeer	WIN	IN	IN
	Audri	Reindeer	IMM	LOW	IN
	Christina	Reindeer	IMM	HIGH	IN
	Dyana	Reindeer	IMM	IN	IN
	Hailey	Reindeer	IMM	IN	IN
	Isabell	Elf	IN	IMM	WIN
	JerBear	Elf	IN	IMM	HIGH
	Jessie	Elf	LOW	WIN	LOW
	Montanna	Elf	IN	IMM	IN
10	Fin	Elf	IN	IMM	ELIM
11	Curtis	Reindeer	IMM	ELIM	
12	Jean	Elf	ELIM		

(WINNER) This baker won the competition.
(RUNNER-UP) This baker was a finalist.
(ELIM) This baker was eliminated.
(HIGH) This baker had one of the highest-ranked dishes in the main heat.
(LOW) This baker had one of the lowest-ranked dishes in the main heat.
(WIN) This baker had the best dish in the main heat.
(IMM) This baker was immune from elimination due to being on the winning team in the main heat.

== Specials ==
=== Christmas in July (2019) ===
Four bakers and self-professed holiday fanatics, competed in a special summer episode of Holiday Baking Championship where the winner got $10,000. The host was Jesse Palmer and the judges were the same as always: Nancy Fuller, Duff Goldman, and Lorraine Pascale.

==== Contestants ====
- 1st – Alessandro Caria, Home Baker from Windermere, Florida
- 2nd/3rd/4th – TyNesha Hills, Pastry Chef from Philadelphia, Pennsylvania
- 2nd/3rd/4th – Jonathan Ramirez, Bakery Owner from Fredericton, Canada
- 2nd/3rd/4th – Jennifer Jacobs, Bakery Owner from Clearwater, Florida

Ep. #	Title	Original Air Date
1	"Christmas In July"	July 8, 2019
	Preliminary Heat: Contestants had 2 hours to make a dozen melted snowman desserts. They rushed to grab hats off prop snowmen with desserts written on the back. Jennifer had to make cupcakes. TyNesha had to make cookies. Jonathan had to make bars. Alessandro had to make brownies. Winner: TyNesha Hills (Her advantage was first pick of the flavor profile in the second round) Main Heat: The bakers had five hours to make a Christmas ice cream cake. They grabbed holiday mugs with different holiday flavors on it that they had to highlight in their cake. For her advantage, TyNesha got to pick cinnamon. Jonathan got eggnog, Jennifer got peppermint, and Alessandro got pumpkin. Mid-round twist was to add an ice cream mix-in to put into their ice cream cake. Jonathan got shredded coconut, Alessandro got granola, TyNesha got pistachios, and Jennifer got toffee. Winner of $10,000: Alessandro Caria Eliminated: TyNesha Hills, Jonathan Ramirez, and Jennifer Jacobs	

== Holiday Baking Championship: Gingerbread Showdown ==
Holiday Baking Championship: Gingerbread Showdown is a spin-off series featuring competitive gingerbread house builders which aired two seasons (2021-2022). The series is hosted by Jesse Palmer (season 1) and Carla Hall (season 2). In season 1, the judges are Kardea Brown, Nacho Aguirre, and Breegan Jane; in season 2 the judges are Carla Hall, Stephanie Boswell, and Kalen Allen.

The format of the series varies from others in the Baking Championship franchise. Every episode features a different group of competitors, and a $10,000 prize is awarded each episode. Because of the large scale of the gingerbread displays, the bakers can prepare components at home in advance, then have 10 hours in the studio to assemble it with the aid of a baking assistant.
