= Crank and Boom Ice Cream =

Coordinates: 38°03′23.6″N 84°31′09.7″W

Crank and Boom
- Industry: Food service
- Founded: 2013; 12 years ago
- Area served: Retail stores serve Lexington, Kentucky. Pints are sold in grocery stores statewide.
- Products: Ice cream, packaged sweets, apparel
- Owner: Toa Green and Mike Green
- Website: www.crankandboom.com

Crank and Boom Ice Cream is an ice cream lounge that was founded in Lexington, Kentucky. The shop has two locations in Kentucky and 40+ retail partners. Crank and Boom provides multiple flavors of ice cream from all natural ingredients. The small business works in the community to reduce their environmental impact while interacting with local charities.

== History ==
Crank and Boom is owned by Toa and Mike Green, who created the business after experimenting with ice cream flavors in their Thai restaurant, Thai Orchid Cafe. They debuted Crank and Boom in 2013 at Thursday Night Live, a weekly live music event, and after that continued to sell ice cream at more mobile events. The Greens opened their first location at the Lexington Distillery District in June 2015, followed by a second location at The Summit at Fritz Farm in September 2017.

== Products ==
=== Ice cream ===
The Crank and Boom website states that their ice cream is made in-house with all natural ingredients from local farms. Most of their toppings are made from scratch and all of the ice cream that does not contain baked goods are marked as egg free, gluten free, and contain no artificial sweeteners or flavorings. The ordering of ice cream can be by single/double scoop or there is a sampler flight of four different flavors of choice. For adults, there is an option to have your ice cream spiked with various alcoholic beverages.

Their signature flavors are marked as Bourbon & Honey, Kentucky Blackberry & Buttermilk, Dark Chocolate Truffle, Coffee Stout, Vanilla Bean, Blueberry Lime Cheesecake, Superfudge, Fresh Strawberry, banana and chocolate, coconut, chocolate fudge brownie, cookies and cream, and Salted Caramel. Crank and Boom also provides fruit sorbets such as Raspberry, Mango, and a Strawberry Balsamic. During the holidays, Crank and Boom adds seasonal flavors such as White Chocolate Peppermint, Blood Orange Cranberry Sorbet, Chocolate Hazelnut, Gingersnap, and Snickerdoodle.

=== Signature Sundaes ===
Crank and Boom offers a variety of sundaes such as a Bourbon Ball, Salted Caramel Brownie, S'Mores, Peanut Butter Cup, Dirt Cup, and a Strawberry Balsamic Sundae.

=== Ice Cream Cocktails ===
At the Lexington Distillery District, there are multiple ice cream cocktails infused with different alcoholic beverages like Stout Dreams, Berry White, Salted Caramel S'Mores Barrel, Coco-Boom, and a Limon Pie concoction.

=== Baked goods ===
Crank and Boom also makes from scratch marshmallows and caramels. The two flavors of the marshmallow are vanilla and bourbon. The two flavors of the caramel are sea salt and bourbon. Once the holiday season commences, there are additional baked goods that are for sale like their white chocolate peppermint bark, gingerbread marshmallows, and a SuperFudge hot chocolate mix.

== Recognition ==
In the June 2018 issue of People Magazine, Crank and Boom was a part of the national list of "100 Reasons to Love America!" In May 2018, Kaley Cuoco thanked Lexington, KY "for the best bourbon ice cream I've ever had!" The most recent coverage was a feature on the show The Best Thing I Ever Ate on The Cooking Channel. The episode was "Voted Most Popular". Jason Smith, a food network star 2017 winner, reviews Crank and Boom bourbon honey ice cream. "They are taking good staple southern flavors and intensifying the flavor."

== Community Involvement ==
In March 2017, Crank and Boom was featured in Kentucky Living magazine which they had a group of Kentucky Proud products reviewed. The owner spoke about how they want to build a value-added system from the farmer all the way to the customer. As the business continued to grow, there were more mentions in local articles about Crank and Boom Ice Cream. The article Crank & Boom's New Chapter was published by SharetheLex. It contained the origin story of Crank and Boom to its next stages in becoming a new addition to the region's first food hall in The Summit at Fritz Farm. For their ingredients, Crank and Boom works with multiple local producers and purveyors such as JD Country Milk, Eckert's - Boyd Orchard, Windstone Farm, Stone Cross Farm, Nate's Coffee, Hosey's Honey, Barrel House Distilling, Ethereal Brewing, and West Six Brewing.

=== Charity Work ===
Crank and Boom Ice Cream interacts with multiple non-profit organizations such as On the Move Art Studio, Nourish Your Neighborhood, Seedleaf, and much more. The art studio co-sponsors a monthly Kids' Art Day which has free art classes, snacks, and ice cream. A portion of the profit of the peanut butter cup sundae goes towards Nourish Your Neighborhood's mission to help feed underserved families in Lexington. A portion of the profit of the dirt cup sundae benefits Seedleaf's mission to nourish communities. The owners emphasize on reaching out to their community and supporting others.
