= Barking =

Barking may refer to:

== Places ==
- Barking, London, a town in East London, England
  - London Borough of Barking, 1965–1980
  - Municipal Borough of Barking, 1931–1965
  - Barking (UK Parliament constituency)
  - Barking (electoral division), Greater London Council
- Barking, Suffolk, a village and civil parish in the Mid Suffolk district of Suffolk, England

== Arts and entertainment ==
- Barking (album), by Underworld
- "Barking" (song), by Ramz
- Barking (TV series), a 1998 British sketch comedy show
- Barking!, a 2004 British children's series

== Other uses ==
- Bark (sound), the sound dogs and some other animals make
- Barker (occupation), someone who attempts to attract patrons to entertainment events
- Barking Rugby Football Club, an English rugby union club in Barking, London

== See also ==
- Barking Lodge, a village in Jamaica
- Barking Sands, Hawaii, United States
- Barking station, Barking, East London, England
- Bark (disambiguation)
