= Mendiant =

Traditional French confectionery

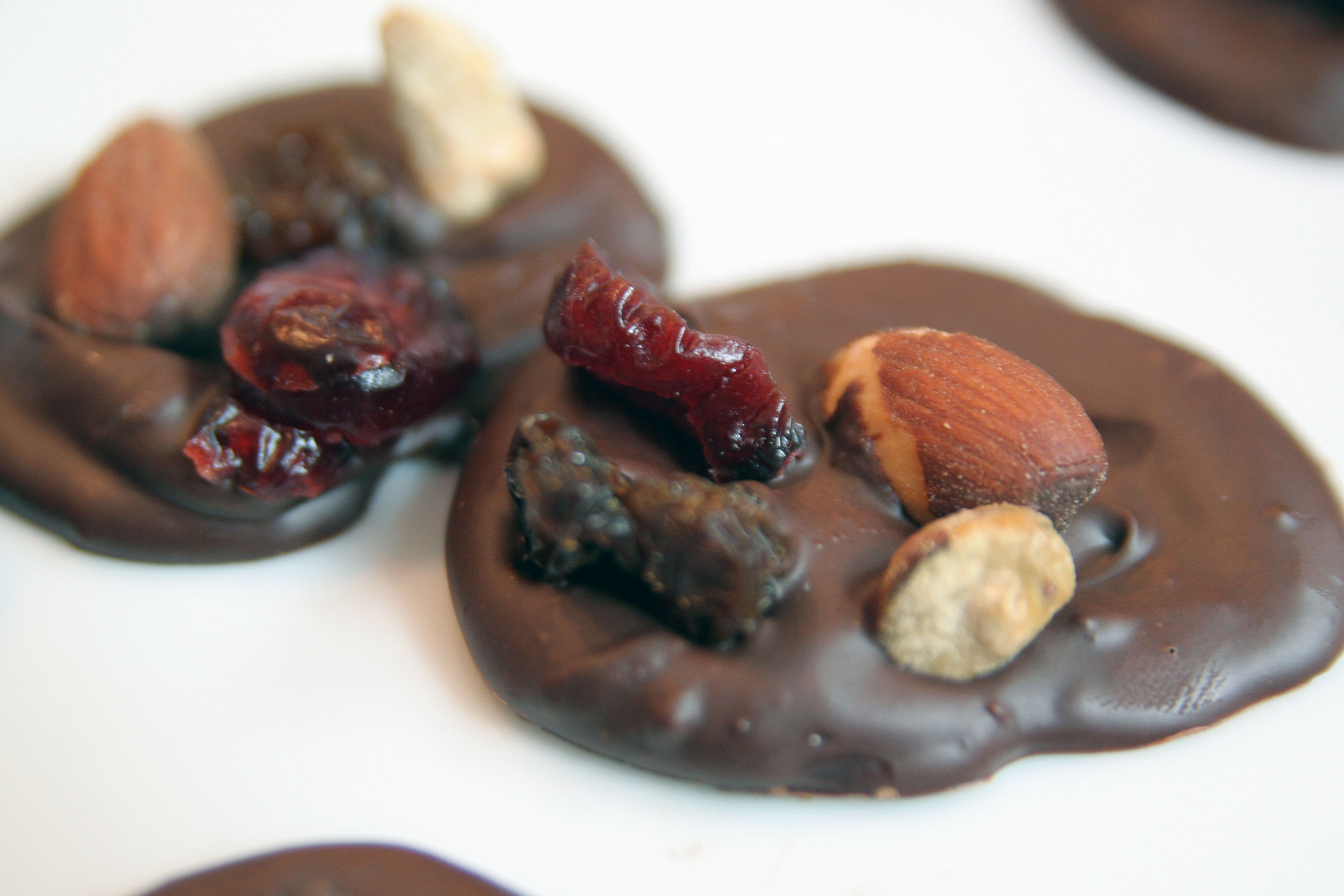
- Four mendiants: pistachio, almond, raisin and candied orange peel
- Type: Confectionery
- Place of origin: France
- Main ingredients: bittersweet chocolate, nuts, dried fruits

A mendiant is a traditional French confection composed of a chocolate disk studded with nuts and dried fruits representing the four mendicant religious orders. Each of the ingredients used refers to the color of monastic robes. Tradition dictates that raisins stand for the black-robed Augustinians, hazelnut for the brown and white habit of the Carmelites, dried fig for the brown-robed Franciscans, and almond for the Dominicans' white robes.

They are usually produced during Christmas. The recipes for this confection have diverged from the traditional combination of nuts and fruits to incorporate seeds, fruit peels, and other items.

== See also ==
- Peppermint bark
- Almond bark
