= Barks =

Barks may refer to:

== People ==
- Al Barks (1936–2018), American baseball player
- Carl Barks (1901–2000), American cartoonist, author, and painter
- Coleman Barks (1937–2026), American poet and academic
- Eddie Barks (1921–1989), English footballer
- Erica Barks-Ruggles (born 1967), American diplomat
- Horace Barks (1895–1983), British Labour politician
- Samantha Barks (born 1990), Manx actress and singer
- Wilfred Barks (1908–1968), English footballer
- William Tecumseh Barks (1840–1906), American civic leader

== Places ==
- Barks, Perry County, Missouri, United States

== Other uses ==
- Bark scale, a psychoacoustical scale proposed by Eberhard Zwicker and named after Heinrich Barkhausen
- 2730 Barks, asteroid from the asteroid belt

== See also ==
- Bark (disambiguation)
- Berks (disambiguation)
- Barks Music News
- Barq's
