= Almond bark =

Almond confection

- Type: Chocolate substitute
- Main ingredients: Vegetable oil, food colouring and flavouring

Almond bark (also known as vanilla flavored candy coating) is a chocolate-like confection made with vegetable fats instead of cocoa butter and with coloring and flavors added. It can be bought in packages, blocks, or round discs where candy and baking supplies are sold. The confection is commonly used to cover or dip fruits, caramel, oats, granola, nuts, cookies, or crackers, in place of real chocolate.

The term is also applied to a type of candy consisting of sheets or chunks of semisweet or milk chocolate to which almonds or almond pieces, and/or cherry almond flavoring have been added.

== See also ==
- White chocolate
- Dark chocolate
- List of almond dishes
- Mendiant
- Peppermint bark
