= Breegan Jane =

American interior designer, TV host, and author

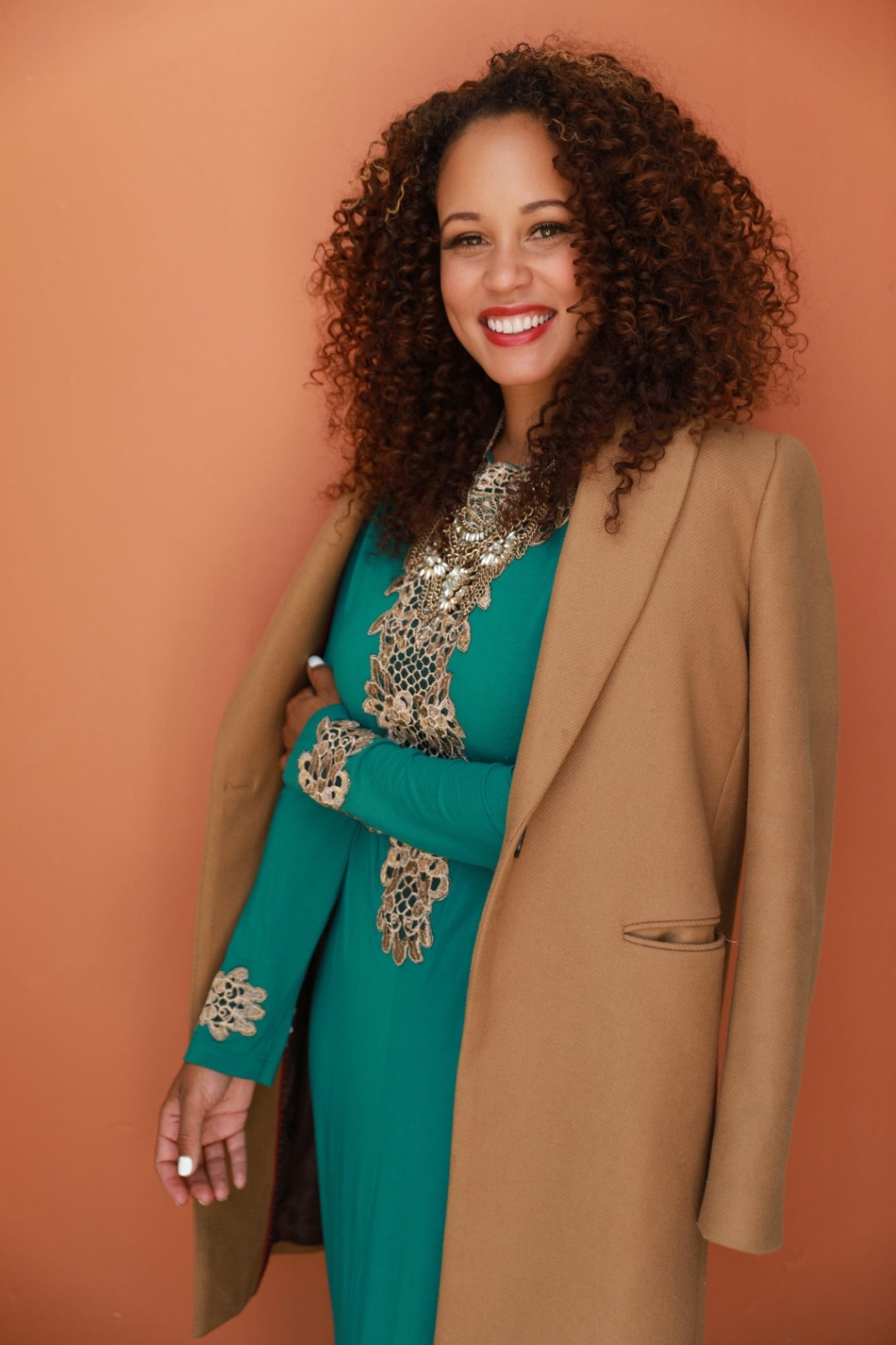
- Citizenship: United States
- Occupations: Interior designer, tv host, and author
- Notable work: Carbie
- Television: Extreme Makeover: Home Edition; Property Brothers; House Party; The House My Wedding Bought; HGTV Dream Home; HGTV Dream Home 2024 Special
- Board member of: Single Moms Planet
- Website: breeganjane.com

Breegan Jane is an American interior designer, philanthropist, TV host, and author. Previously, she co-hosted 100 shows of Mom Life Yo radio show with T Lopez for Dash Radio.

== Career ==
Before her career in interior design, Jane worked as a creative director for a yacht manufacturer.

In 2020, Jane was selected as an interior designer for the show, Extreme Makeover: Home Edition, on HGTV.

In 2022, she started HGTV Dream Home. In the same year, she formed a partnership with Hooker Furnishings. A year later, Jane collaborated with Habitat for Humanity of Greater Los Angeles to help simplify the homeownership application process for prospective homeowners.

In February 2024, Jane worked with U.K.-based Clarke & Clarke to release her debut collection of textiles and wallpaper, which were displayed at Kravet showrooms. In the same year, she was selected to host the HGTV Dream Home 2024 Special television show on HGTV. Previously, she has also appeared on Food Network, Discovery+ and HBO Max.

Jane owns and operates an interior design business based in Southern California. Her design work in Bel Air has been featured on the Netflix series Selling Sunset.

== Writing ==
Jane has written children's books as well as design-focused nonfiction. Her book Carbie, first published by Archway Publishing in 2019, tells the story of a piece of coal transformed under pressure and was presented as a lesson in perseverance for young readers.

In 2025, Gibbs Smith published California Beach House Luxury, written with Kristin Feaster and Terrence Dove. In its review, Publishers Weekly described the volume as a visually elaborate account of the design of Jane's Venice Beach home.

== Personal life ==
Jane is a single Black mother and also serves on the board of Single Moms Planet. She works with World Vision to advocate for women's rights, with initial projects targeting the welfare of women and children in Kenya.

== Filmography ==
- Extreme Makeover: Home Edition
- Property Brothers
- House Party
- The House My Wedding Bought
