= Jane Bark =

Swedish illustrator (1931–2023)

Jane Ulla Margareta Bark
- Born: Jane Ulla Margareta Årfelt; 9 April 1931; Stockholm, Sweden
- Died: 14 January 2023 (aged 91)

Jane Ulla Margareta Bark née Årfelt (9 April 1931 – 14 January 2023) was a Swedish illustrator. She worked first as a commercial artist for Dagens Nyheter and went on to illustrate stories in various magazines including Femina in the 1960s and 1970s. She later contributed portraits of Swedish celebrities to the magazine Fokus. Her awards included the Swedish advertising prize Platinaägget (The Platinum Egg) in 1985.

== Early life and education ==
Born in Stockholm on 9 April 1931, after completing girls school in 1949, Jane Ulla Margareta Årfelt studied advertising and book art at Konstfack, graduating in 1953. It was there she befriended fellow student Stig Bark, whom she later married. She completed her education at Högre konstindustriella skolan (Higher Art Industrial School, HKS).

== Career ==
On graduating, Bark first worked for an advertising agency, then in the studio at Dagens Nyheter (1956–58). The then worked freelance, contributing illustrations to a variety of newspapers and journals. In particular, she illustrated the short stories published in Femina in the 1960s and 1970s, often depicting portraits of women in her colourful, undulating style. From 2005 to 2012, she contributed portraits to Fokus in connection with the people interviewed there each week.

Her illustrations of women in Femina depict bodies which look elastic and almost always in motion. Those she drew for the fashion manufacturer Wahls emphasized the clothes, as she correctly interpreted the needs of her assignments. By the 1990s, in line with the times, her style became more subdued. She also designed attractive covers for all kinds of books, whether detective stories, poetry or novels.

After suffering from Alzheimers for a lengthy period, Bark died on 14 January 2023, aged 91.

Her work is preserved at MoGA, the digital graphic art museum run by her children John and Molly Bark.

== Awards ==
As early as 1961, Bark was awarded Guldägget (The Golden Egg) at the advertising sector's first gala. In 1985, she received Platinaägget (The Platinum Egg), Sweden's highest award for advertising and design.
