= Peppermint bark =

Chocolate candy

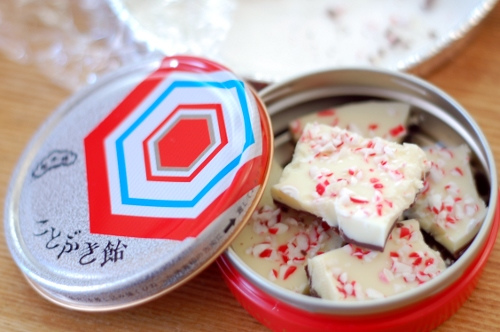
- Type: Chocolate
- Main ingredients: White chocolate, dark chocolate, peppermint

Peppermint bark is a chocolate confection. Generally, it consists of peppermint candy pieces, such as candy canes, in white chocolate on top of dark chocolate, but peppermint bark can refer to any chocolate with peppermint candy pieces in it.

It is especially popular around the Christmas season. Companies known for selling it seasonally include Williams Sonoma, Ghirardelli, and Dove. Though they do not label it as peppermint bark, Hershey's also sells peppermint Hershey's kisses.

In the United States, peppermint bark is also sold by some Girl Scout troops as part of an expanded range of items other than cookies. Jelly Belly also sells a combination of its dark chocolate and candy cane jelly beans as a "Peppermint Bark Recipe Mix".

== History ==
The origins of peppermint bark are unclear. Williams Sonoma introduced its version and popularized it in 1998, though the confection existed as early as 1966 in the United States. Peppermint bark is a variation on chocolate bark, which is thought to be derived from traditional French mendiants, though the true origins of this connection have been lost.

== Recipes and ingredients ==
The recipe for peppermint bark uses few ingredients, with only chocolate and mint candies required. Some recipes also add peppermint flavoring. The candies used may be candy canes. The candies should be broken up, and the chocolate is melted. These two ingredients are combined on a baking sheet and then chilled until firm. The bark is then removed from the sheet and broken into pieces in a similar way to peanut brittle.

Variations on peppermint bark can include a two-toned layered type, where a bottom layer of dark chocolate is covered with the white chocolate and crushed mint layer on top. This particular variation also includes Ghirardelli's Peppermint Bark Squares.
