= List of Swedish women photographers =

This is a list of women photographers who were born in Sweden or whose works are closely associated with that country.

== A ==
- Sofia Ahlbom (1803–1868), feminist, practiced as a photographer from the 1860s
- Elise Arnberg (1826–1891), miniaturist and photographer

== B ==
- Beata Bergström (1921–2016), photographer, known for her dance and theatre work
- Arvida Byström (born 1991), photographer and model based in Los Angeles

== C ==
- Anna Clarén (born 1972), photographer and educator

== D ==
- Lotten von Düben (1828–1915), early amateur photographer

== E ==
- Hélène Edlund (1858–1941), views of buildings and nature of Skansen
- Hedda Ekman (1860–1929), writer and photographer

== F ==
- Ingrid Falk (born 1960), installation artist
- Hanna Ferlin (1870–1947), photographer and suffragist
- Lisa Fonssagrives (1911–1992), model, dancer, sculptor, and photographer
- Maria Friberg (born 1966), painter, photographer, video artist

== G ==
- Marianne Greenwood (1916–2006), photographed Picasso and other artists in Antibes after the Second World War, later photographing the peoples of the Pacific islands and parts of Asia

== H ==
- Johanna Hald (born 1945), screenwriter, photographer
- Caroline Hebbe (1930–2018), art photographer with the Fotofrom movement
- Brita Sofia Hesselius (1801–1866), Sweden's first professional female photographer, opening a studio in Karlstad in 1845
- Martina Holmberg

== J ==
- Selma Jacobsson (1841–1899), royal court photographer
- Erika Jonn (1865-1931), Swedish painter
- Lina Jonn (1861–1896), early Swedish professional photographer in Helsingborg and Lund, remembered for her documentary work
- Maria Jonn (1855-1910), photographer and businesswoman

== K ==
- Edit Kindvall (1866–1951), Storvik photographer and women's rights activist
- Marie Kinnberg (1806–1858), painter and pioneering photographer
- Caroline von Knorring (1841–1925), one of Sweden's first professional female photographers

== L ==
- Wilhelmina Lagerholm (1826–1917), portrait and genre painter, photographer
- Annika Larsson (born 1972), contemporary artist, photographer
- Tuija Lindström (1950–2017), noted for her black-and-white pictures of women in a black lake addressing feminist issues

== M ==
- Gunnie Moberg (1941–2007), photographer in Orkney, Shetland and the Faroes

== O ==
- Elisabeth Ohlson (born 1961), photographs sexual minorities, noted for her 1998 Ecce Homo portraying Jesus among homosexuals

== P ==
- Katarina Pirak Sikku (born 1965), Swedish Sami painter and photographer

== R ==
- Mathilda Ranch (1860–1938), early professional photographer who ran studios in Varberg and the surrounding area
- Anna Riwkin-Brick (1908–1970), portrait and dance photography, photo-journalistic work

== S ==
- Emma Schenson (1827–1913), early professional photographer
- Kristina Schmid (born 1972), fine art photographer
- Helene Schmitz (born 1960), photographer, writer
- Olga Segerberg (1868–1951), photographer and suffragist
- Hilda Sjölin (1835–1915), one of Sweden's first professional female photographers, opening a studio in Malmö in 1861
- Rosalie Sjöman (1833–1919), highly regarded portrait photographer
- Hedvig Söderström (1830–1914), first woman to open a studio in Stockholm

== T ==
- Anastasia Taylor-Lind (born 1981), photojournalist
- Maria Tesch (1850–1936), professional photographer, studio in Linköping
- Ida Trotzig (1864–1943), photographer, ethnographer, Japanologist, painter and writer

== V ==
- Bertha Valerius (1835–1915), official photographer of the Royal Swedish court

== W ==
- Berit Wallenberg (1902–1995), archaeologist, art historian, photographer

== See also ==
- List of women photographers
