= Hilda Sjölin =

Swedish photographer (1835–1915)

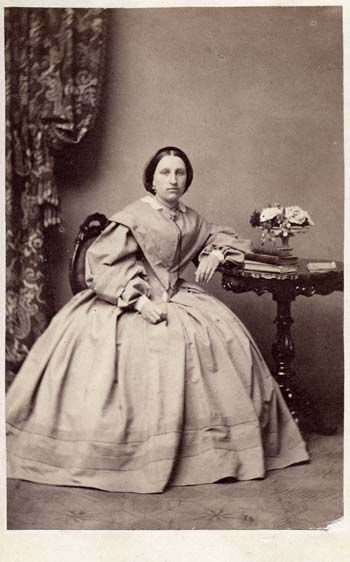
- Born: Hilda Sjölin; 1835; Sweden
- Died: 1915 (aged 79–80); Sweden
- Occupation: photographer

Hilda Sjölin (1835–1915) was a Swedish photographer, one of the first known professional woman pioneer photographers in her country.

== Life ==
Hilda Aurora Amanda Sjölin (1835-1915) was raised in Malmö as one of four daughters, where she was the youngest, and a brother Rudolf Theodor Sjölin. On 24 May 1860 she advertised in Malmö that she performed photography on glass, waxcanvas and paper, and by February 1861, she opened her own studio on Västergatan 64 (today number 8), in the house where she was raised.

Hilda Sjölin was soon the "competent rival" of the other photographer of the city, Carl Magnus Tullberg, and no longer had to advertise. She was known for her card – and portrait photography, and was from 1864 also employed as a photographer of the city views. She was the first photographer to take stereographic images of Malmö. She is not known to be active after 1870. She left Malmö in 1884 with her likewise unmarried elder sister Minni Rosaura Sjölin (born 1829), and they moved in to her brother Rudolf, in 1900 the sisters moved to Sätofta and then they moved to Hörby in 1910.

Hilda Sjölin belonged to the pioneer generation of female professional photographers in Sweden after Brita Sofia Hesselius: the same time as she became active, Hedvig Söderström in Stockholm (1857), Emma Schenson in Uppsala and Wilhelmina Lagerholm in Örebro (1862), among others, became the first professional photographers of their respective cities: during the 1860s, they were at least 15 confirmed female photographers in Sweden, three of whom, Rosalie Sjöman, Caroline von Knorring and Bertha Valerius belonging to the elite of their profession. In 1888, the first woman, Anna Hwass, became a member of the board of the Photographic Society.

== Samples of photographic work ==
- Malmö Museer - Hilda Sjölin
