= Edlund =

Edlund is a Swedish surname. Notable people with the surname include:

- Ben Edlund (born 1968), American comic book artist and writer
- Christoffer Edlund (born 1987), Swedish Bandy player
- Erik Edlund (1819–1888), Swedish physicist
- Helen Edlund (born 1968), Swedish curler
- Hélène Edlund (1858–1941), Swedish photographer
- Johan Edlund (born 1971), Swedish singer, guitarist and keyboardist
- Lars Edlund (1922–2013), Swedish composer, organist and music teacher
- Lenea Edlund (1891–1937), Swedish-born American politician
- Madelaine Edlund (born 1985), Swedish footballer
- Oskar Edlund (born 2002), Swedish hurdler
- Pär Edlund (born 1967), Swedish ice hockey player
- Richard Edlund (born 1940), American special effects cinematographer
- Sylvia Edlund (1945–2014), Canadian botanist
