= Mathilda Ranch =

Swedish photographer (1860–1938)

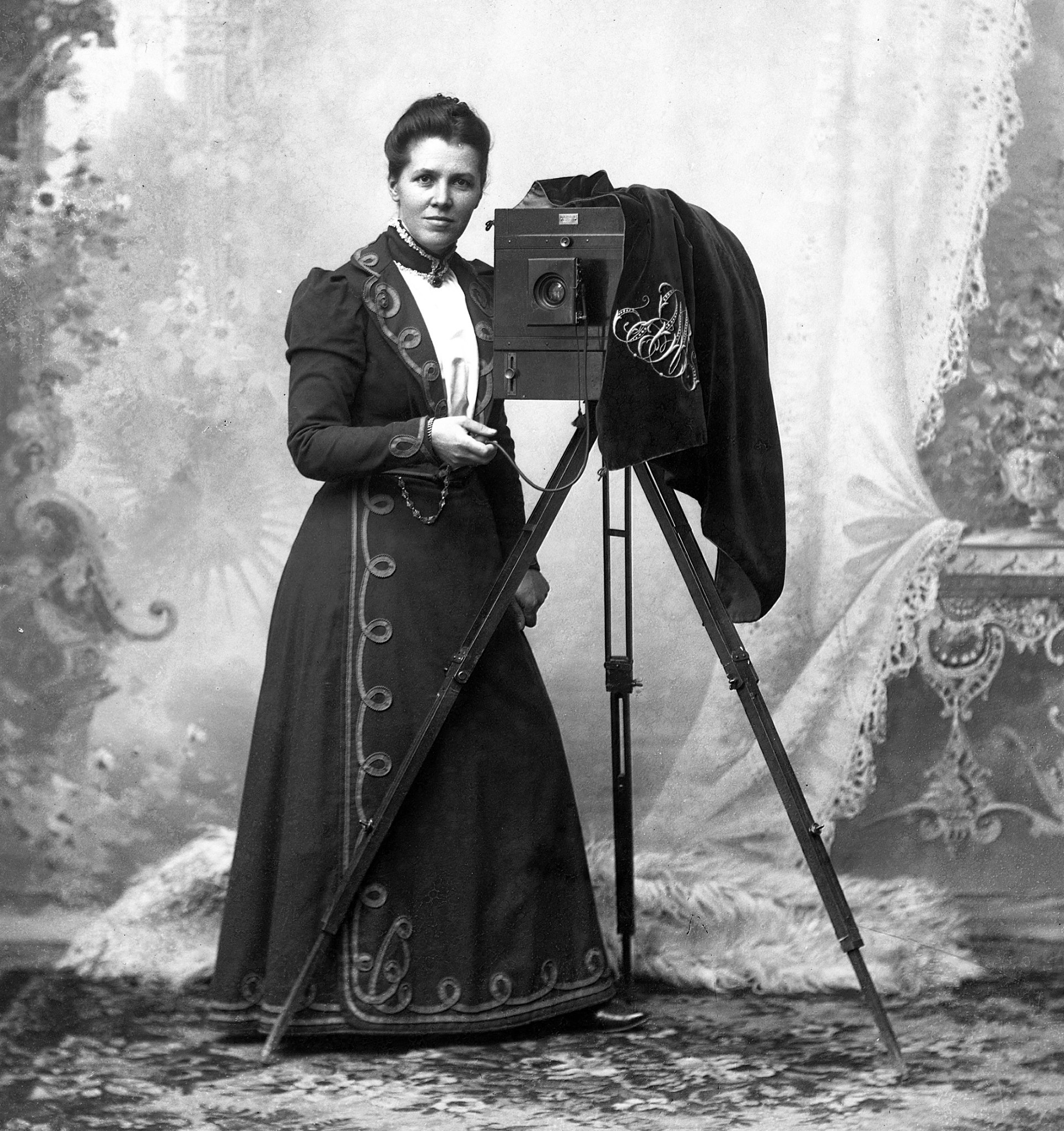
Ranch in her Varberg studio

Carolina Mathilda Ranch (23 June 1860 – 11 June 1938) was a Swedish female photographer who ran a studio in Varberg in south-western Sweden. A pioneer amongst female photographers, she produced thousands of photographs, many of which are preserved in the archives of the Halland Museum of Cultural History.

== Biography ==
Born on 23 June 1860 in Copenhagen, Denmark, Mathilda was the daughter of the photographer and engineer Wilhelm Ranch (died 1906). She moved to Sweden with her family when she was 10, first to Gothenburg and then to Varberg where her father established a photographic studio in 1871.

In 1882, when she was only 22, her father transferred the studio to her, preferring to act as a shipping agent. She proved not only to be a good photographer but a successful businesswomen, soon opening branches in Slöinge, Horred and Kungsbacka. She engaged up to five employees to assist her in her work, mostly women, except for Elof Ernwald whom she hired in 1894. Ernwald took care of the administrative work while Ranch handled the photography.

In addition to portraits and wedding photographs, Ranch took many landscapes and street photographs in Varberg and the surroundings. Her work includes images of train derailments, air shows and royal visits. She also took photographs for the newspaper Hvar 8:e Dag and the tourist publication Svenska Turistföreningens årsskrift. Ranch was also an active feminist, fighting for women's rights under her motto kvinnor kan (women can).

Mathilda Ranch died in Varberg on 11 June 1938.

== Gallery ==
Photographs by Mathilda Ranch

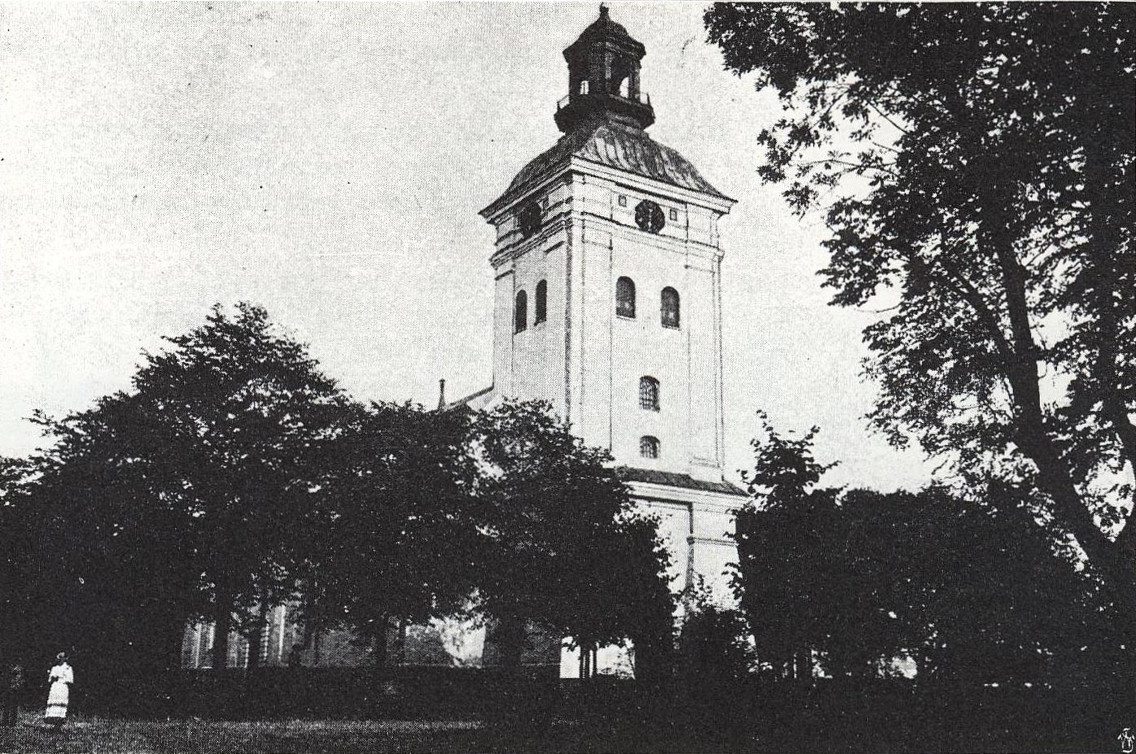
Varberg Church

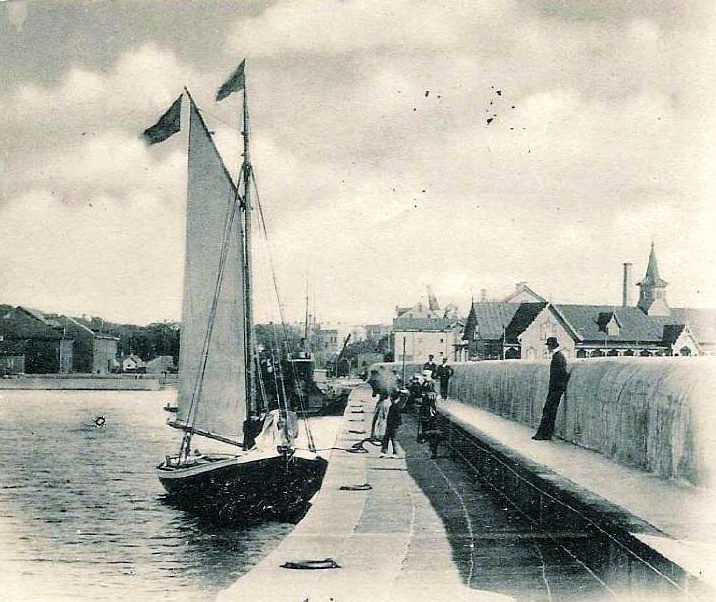
Varberg harbour ca. 1900

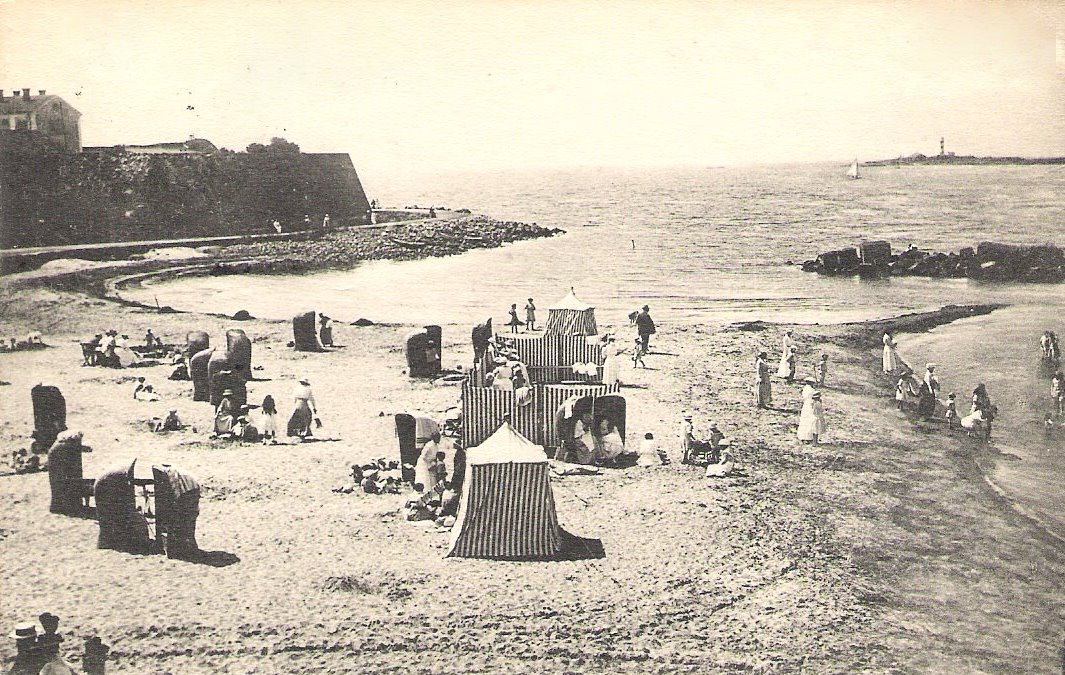
Varberg beach (postcard)

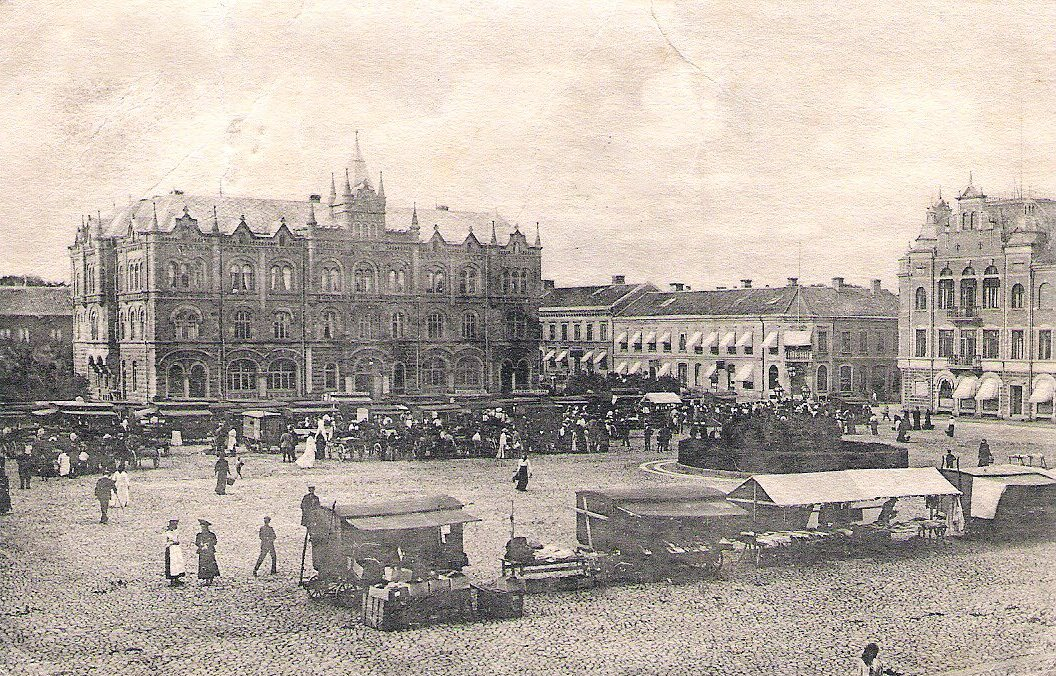
Varberg market square
