= Adelaïde Leuhusen =

Swedish artist (1828–1923)

- Born: Amalia Aurora Adelaïde Valerius; December 1, 1828; Stockholm, Sweden
- Died: 1923 (aged 94–95)
- Known for: Painting, singing
- Spouse: Axel Reinhold Leuhusen (m. 1858)

Amalia Aurora Adelaïde Leuhusen, née Valerius (1 December 1828 – 1923), was a Swedish baroness, painter and concert singer. She was a teacher and benefactor of the famous Swedish opera singer Christina Nilsson, whom she introduced to Paris, where Nilsson started her international career. She was a member of the Royal Swedish Academy of Music. During her lifetime, she was famous throughout Sweden and known for her work outside of her native country.

== Life ==
She was born to the chancellor Johan David Valerius and Kristina Aurora Ingell and the sister of Bertha Valerius. Early on, she displayed talent within both the art of singing, and of painting, and was given private tuition in both fields. From 1852, she studied art in Dresden. In parallel, she studied singing as a student for Fanny Schäfer in Leipzig, and Ludwig Rellstab in Berlin. She performed as a singer at several concerts in Germany.

In 1858, she married baron Axel Reinhold Leuhusen (1815–1886), and moved to Gothenburg, where she established herself as a singing teacher. In parallel, she continued to make trips abroad to study art and singing in Germany and France. At one of her study trips to Paris, she brought her student Christina Nilsson, who was thereby launched internationally.

Leuhusen lived in Stockholm from 1870, where she was a singing teacher of some repute. From 1874, she studied and worked as a painter under Marhall in Dresden and Florence. She participated in the exhibitions of the Royal Swedish Academy of Arts.

Adelaïde Leuhusen was inducted to the Royal Swedish Academy of Music in 1872.

The Finnish artist Albert Edelfelt was a family acquaintance and painted a portrait of Adelaïde Leuhusen in 1872.
