= Emma Schenson =

Swedish photographer (1827–1913)

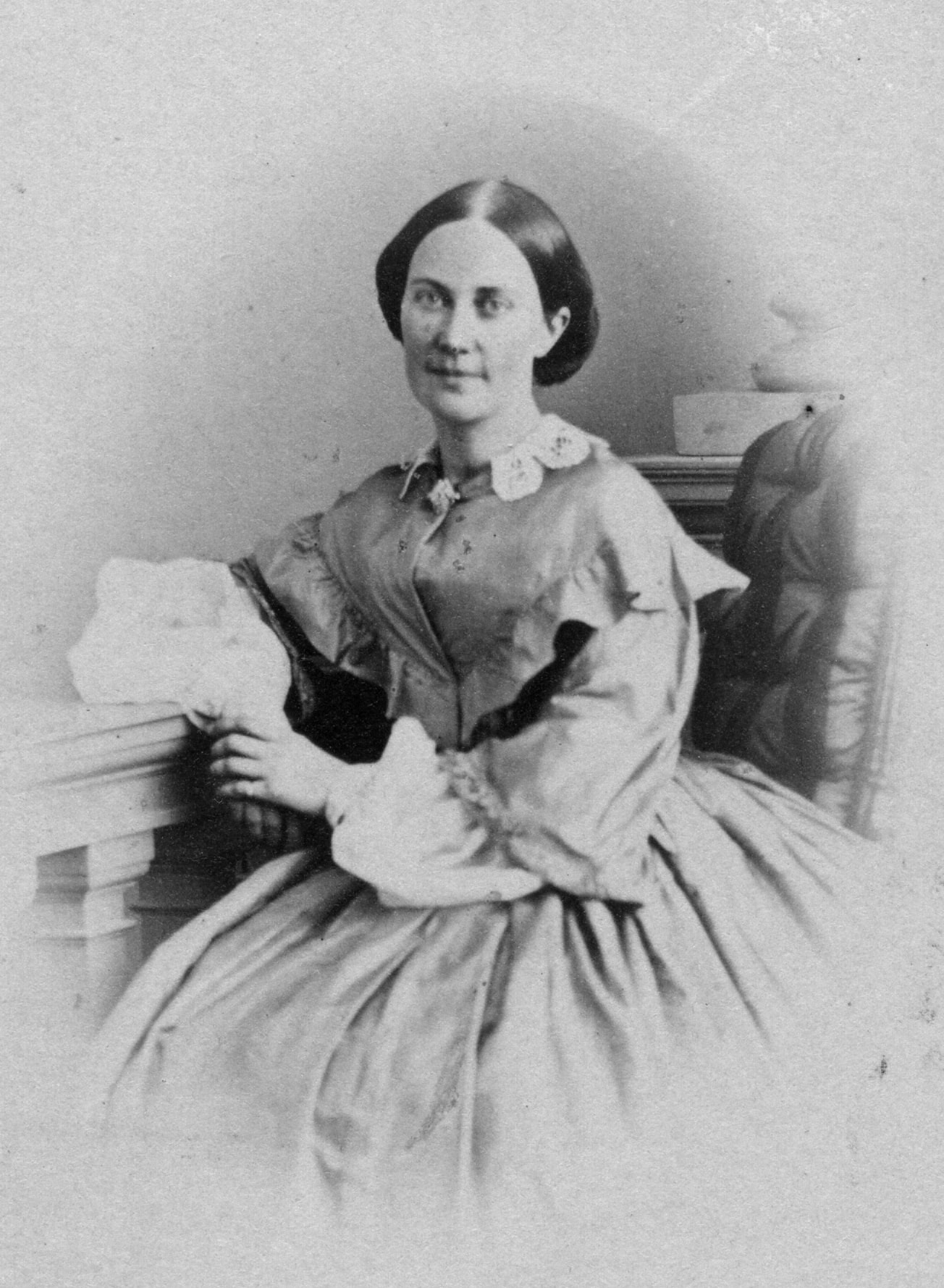
Emma Schenson

Emma Sofia Perpetua Schenson (21 September 1827 – 17 March 1913) was a Swedish photographer and painter. She was one of the earliest female professional photographers in Sweden.

== Biography ==
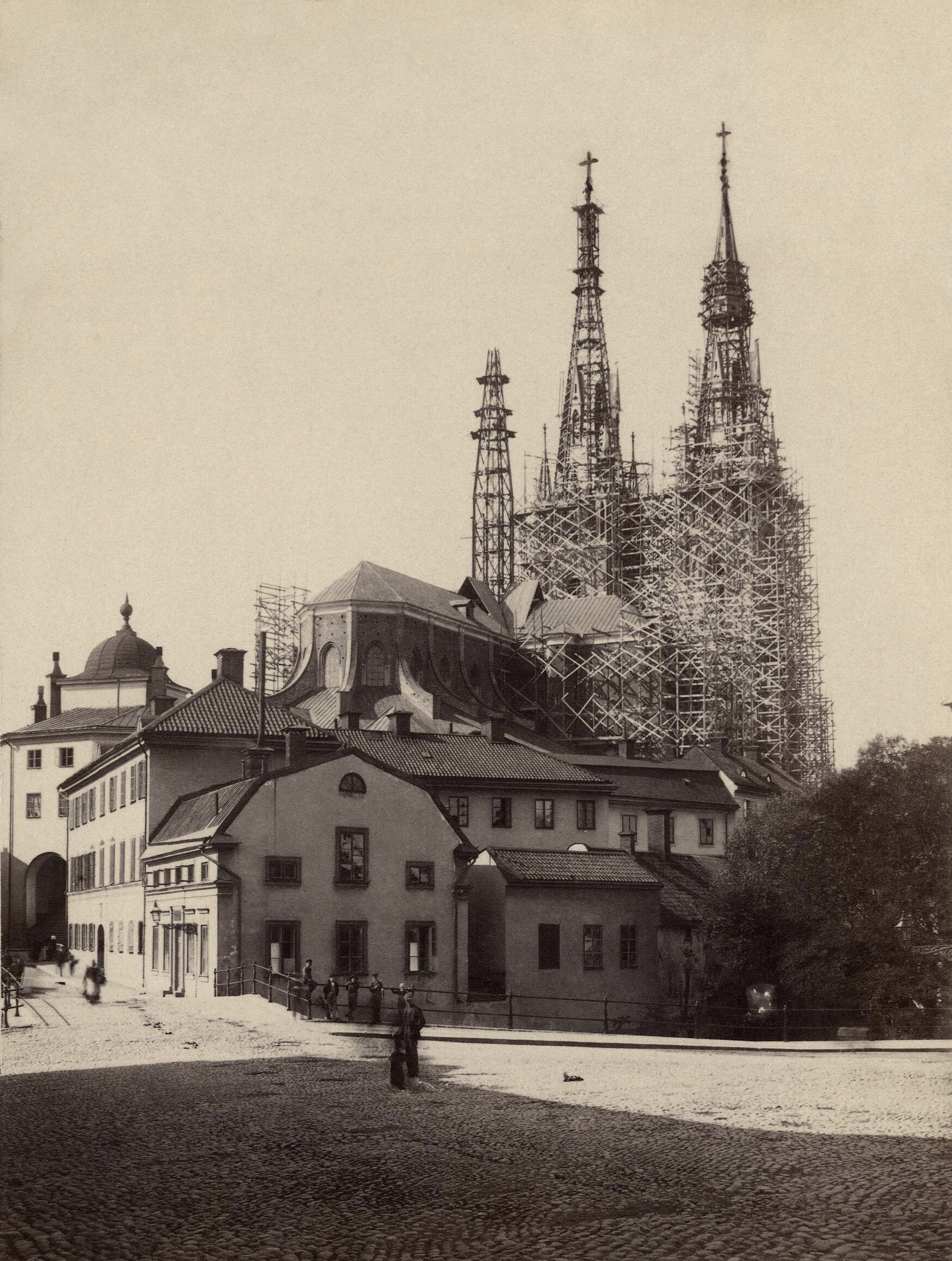
Photograph of Uppsala Cathedral, 1889

Born in Uppsala on 21 September 1827, Schenson was the daughter of the academy treasurer John Schenson and the school administrator Maria Magdalena Hahr. There are no records of her education or of how she became familiar with photography.

By the 1860s, she had opened a studio in Uppsala, becoming one of Sweden's earliest female professional photographers and the first to establish a business in Uppsala. In addition to photographs of Uppsala Cathedral, she produced a series of some 20 albumen prints as a tribute to the Swedish botanist Carl Linnaeus (1707–1778). In the 1880s and 90s, she produced a further technically perfect series of the cathedral showing the progress and results of restoration work. The images reveal not only her technical skills but also her aptitude at positioning the camera to obtain architecturally excellent images. Although Schenson's negatives have disappeared, her photographs of the cathedral under repair can be seen in an album at the university library.

Emma Schenson died in Uppsala on 17 March 1913. She is remembered as one of Sweden's earliest female professional photographers along with Rosalie Sjöman in Stockholm, Hilda Sjölin in Malmö and Wilhelmina Lagerholm in Örebro.

== See also ==
- Brita Sofia Hesselius

== Gallery ==
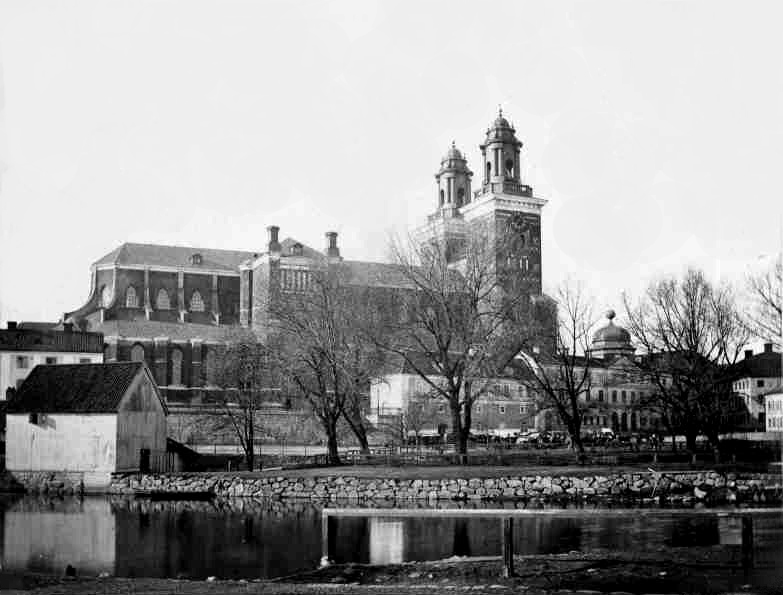
Uppsala Cathedral, 1860

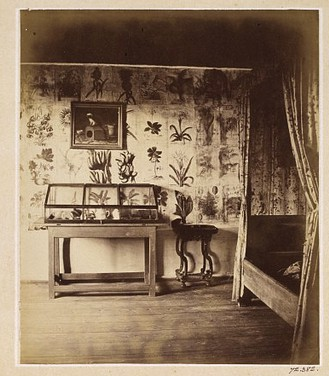
Linnaeus bedroom, 1864

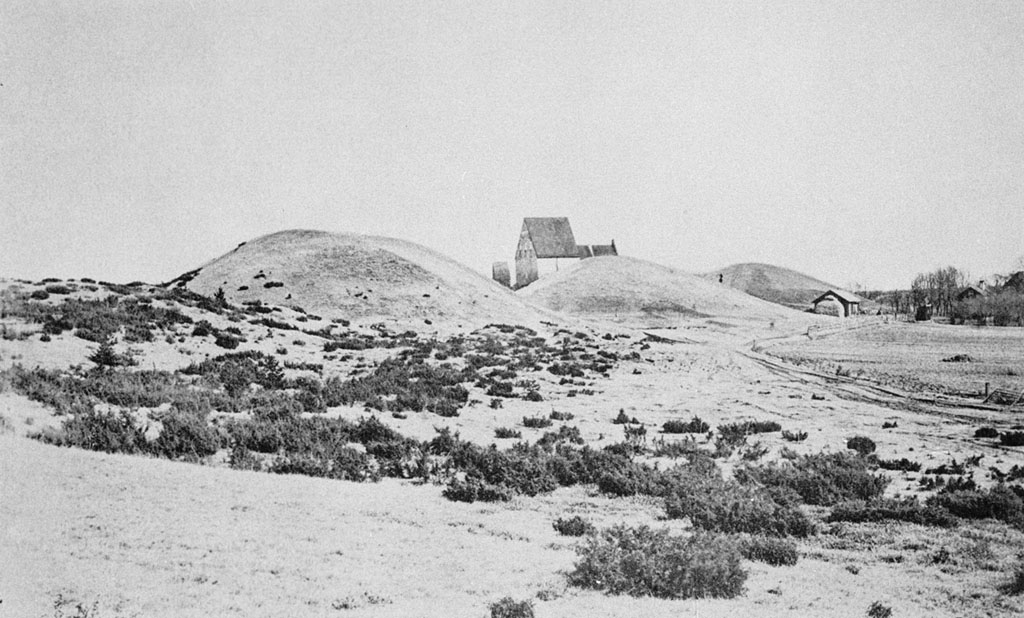
Uppsala Mounds, 1895
