= Rosalie Sjöman =

Swedish photographer (1833–1919)

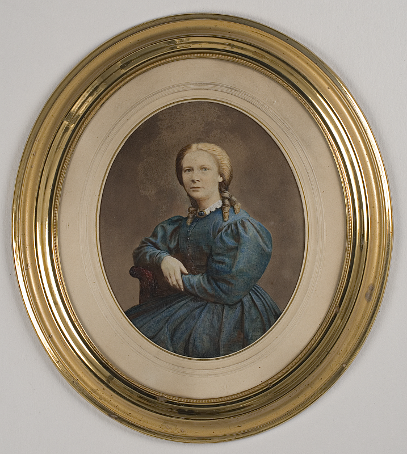
Rosalie Sjöman, self-portrait c.1875

Rosalie Sofie Sjöman (née Hammarqvist, 1833–1919) was an early Swedish female photographer. From the mid-1860s, she became one of Stockholm's most highly regarded portrait photographers.

== Biography ==
Born on 16 October 1833 in Kalmar in the south of Sweden, Sjöman was the daughter of John Peter Hammarqvist, a captain in the merchant navy. When she turned 22, she married Captain Sven Sjöman, who was 15 years senior to her. After moving to Stockholm in 1857, the couple had two sons and a daughter. When her husband died of alcoholism in 1864, she worked as the assistant to the photographer Carl Johan Malmberg who had established one of the city's earliest photographic studios in 1859. She later took over his studio and operated it in her own name.

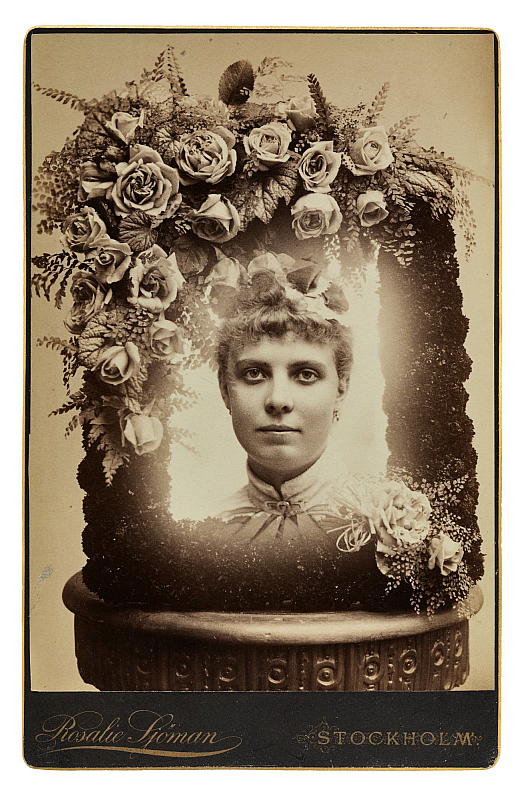
Rosalie Sjöman: Alma, c.1880

Sjöman soon gained a reputation as one of Stockholm's best portrait photographers. She eventually employed a staff of some ten assistants, opening studios in Kalmar, Halmstad and Vaxholm. She was also conversant with the latest techniques, coating her images with a thin film of collodion to gain a glossy effect. She also produced coloured portraits with tinting, several of which can be seen in Stockholm's Nordic Museum. Artur Hazelius bought 26 of her works for his collection in 1877, four years after he founded the museum. Examples of her portraits can also be seen in the Royal Library.

In 1875, she married the photographer Gustaf Fredrik Diehl who had been active in Vyborg, Finland. After giving birth to a third son and a second daughter, in 1881 she moved with her five children to a new property of Regeringsgatan where she opened a new studio, soon separating from Diehl. In the early 1880s, she took her most celebrated portrait, a photograph of her daughter Alma surrounded by roses. She continued to run her studio on Regeringsgatan until 1905.

Sjöman died in Stockholm in 1919, aged 86. She is remembered as one of Sweden's earliest female professional photographers along with Emma Schenson in Uppsala, Hilda Sjölin in Malmö and Wilhelmina Lagerholm in Örebro

== See also ==
- List of Swedish women photographers
