= Maria Jonn =

Swedish photographer and businesswoman)

- Born: 3 May 1855; Stora Råby, near Lund.
- Died: October 16, 1910 (aged 55); Lund
- Known for: Photographer and businesswoman

Maria Jonn (3 May 1855 – 16 October 1910) was a Swedish photographer and businesswoman.

== Early life and education ==
Maria Jonn was born on 3 May 1855, the fourth of seven children born to Hanna (née Pålsdotter) and Jöns Johnsson, tenant farmers in Stora Råby, near Lund. Her siblings were Anna, Jonas, Hanna, Pål, Carolina, and Erika. Maria was nicknamed Maja by the family.

In 1875, after their father's death from blood poisoning, the family moved into the town of Lund. Their eldest brother, Jonas, became the guardian of his younger siblings. Unmarried women were legally under the guardianship of a male relative until marriage at this time in Sweden. They remained a close-knit family throughout their lives despite worldwide travel and emigration.

In 1878, Maria Jonn undertook a teacher training course in Ystad. She then went to work as a teacher at a junior school.

== Photography career ==
In 1886, Jonn travelled to Helsingborg with Lina Jonn, her youngest sister, when the latter got a job at a photography studio run by Finnish photographer Per Alexiz Brandt. Over the following years, Lina built up her photographic skills there, assisted by both Maria and their older sister Hanna.

In September 1889, Maria Jonn made a solo journey by ship across the Atlantic Ocean to Argentina to help run her brother Pål's household there. He worked as a mining inspector across North and South America. In 1891, Jonn returned to Sweden to support her sister Lina in her new business venture Fotografisk Atelier Lina Jonn, a photographic studio in Lund. Maria Jonn worked as a photographic assistant in the business. She also supported the fledgling business with some of the capital needed to launch it.

The studio at Bantorget 6 in Lund was both a financial and artistic success. Lina Jonn was the face of the business and became famous throughout Sweden as a photographer, particularly after a photo of Oscar II of Sweden taken in May 1893 was widely circulated. Maria Jonn also worked as a photographer in the business but appears to have preferred to remain in the background.

In 1895, Lina Jonn married a Norwegian farmer she had met three years earlier when on holiday with their sister Erika Jonn, an artist. Lina emigrated to Norway, and Maria Jonn took over the running of the business, building on its success. She kept the name "Lina Jonn" as it was an established brand with a reputation for quality. The business became increasingly successful under Maria's leadership, winning competitions and being covered in the Swedish media.

Jonn was an effective businesswoman. Although she occasionally still worked as a photographer, she expanded the business by recruiting good photographers to work for her. Per Bagge, later a well-known photographer in Lund, had his professional start in the Jonn studio. Jonn concentrated on the business side and expanded the business, opening further photography studios in the towns of Malmö in 1904 and in Arlöv in 1905.

The same year, she sold the Lund branch at Bantorget to Per Bagge, who then ran the shop under the name of Lina Jonns Efterträdare (Lina Jonn's successors).

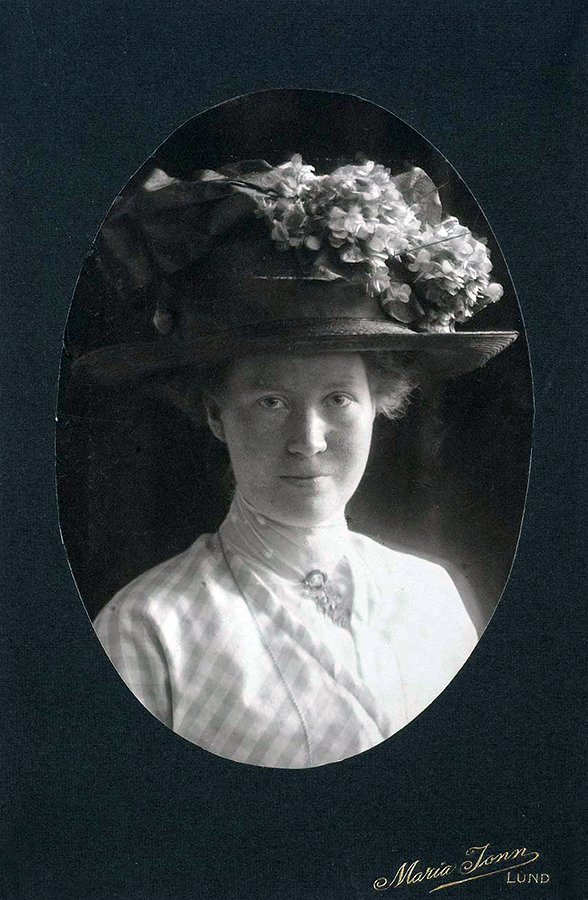
Portrait of Ida Ekelund taken by Maria Jonn

At this point, Maria Jonn changed the business name to Atelier Jonn. Jonn began to expand her portfolio beyond portrait photography and started producing photographs of significant events and printing them up as souvenir postcards. This became particularly popular in the earliest years of the twentieth century. Her image of the visit by Crown Prince Gustaf Adolf and Crown Princess Margareta to Malmö in 1905 was particularly popular.

In 1908, Maria Jonn sold the Malmö branch of her photography business to another photographer named Ragnar Küller, who also ran the Ystad branch under the name of Atelier Lina Jonn.

Around 1905, Jonn bought a property at Stora Gråbrödersgatan 12 in Lund and had a modern commercial photography studio built. Completed in 1908, the photographic studio was on the top floor to make good use of daylight from a large roof window during the day. At night, electrical lighting was used, still a rarity at the time—the ground-floor shop sold photographic equipment. The building had Jonn emblazoned on the frontage and a carved stone camera at the apex of the façade. Photographer Ida Ekelund ran the studio and took over the business, running it under the name of Atelier Jonn – Ida Ekelund following Jonn's death.

== Personal life ==
In 1896, Maria's sister Lina gave birth to a son, John Tandberg (1896–1968), in her new home in Norway, but died of heart failure a few weeks later. Maria Jonn travelled to Norway, organised her sister's burial, and then brought her nephew home with her to Lund. She raised him with her sisters, Erika and Hanna. He went on to become a physicist, industrial chemist, author, and humorist.

By 1901, Jonn had bought a building in Stora Tomégatan in Lund. The extended Jonn family moved in there together. By 1903, Jonn was one of the most highly taxed residents in Lund.

Maria Jonn died on 16 October 1910 from cancer of the spine and was buried in St Peter's Kloster cemetery.

Her obituary in Svenska Dagbladet paid tribute to "an unusually hardworking woman, who was highly interested in her art, and very sympathetic in her demeanour, whose life's work is a telling example of how a diligent and practically minded woman can in our time find ample pastures to suit her inclination and aptitude".
