= Lina Jonn =

Swedish photographer (1861–1896)

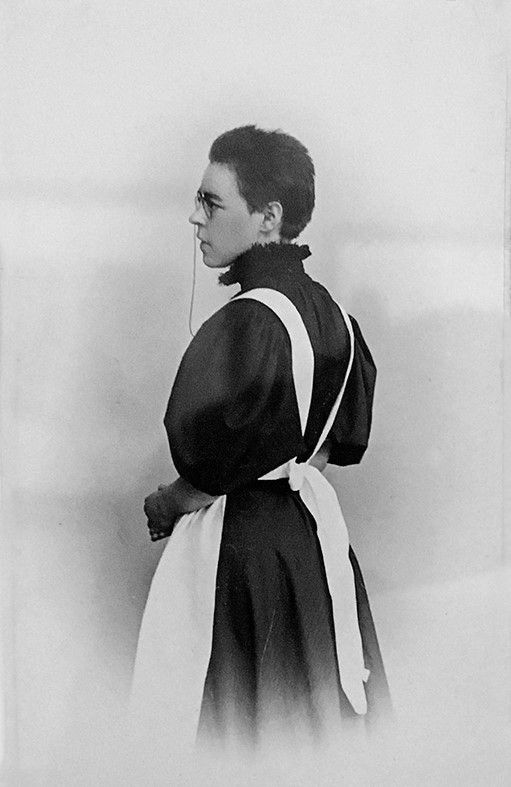
Lina Jonn

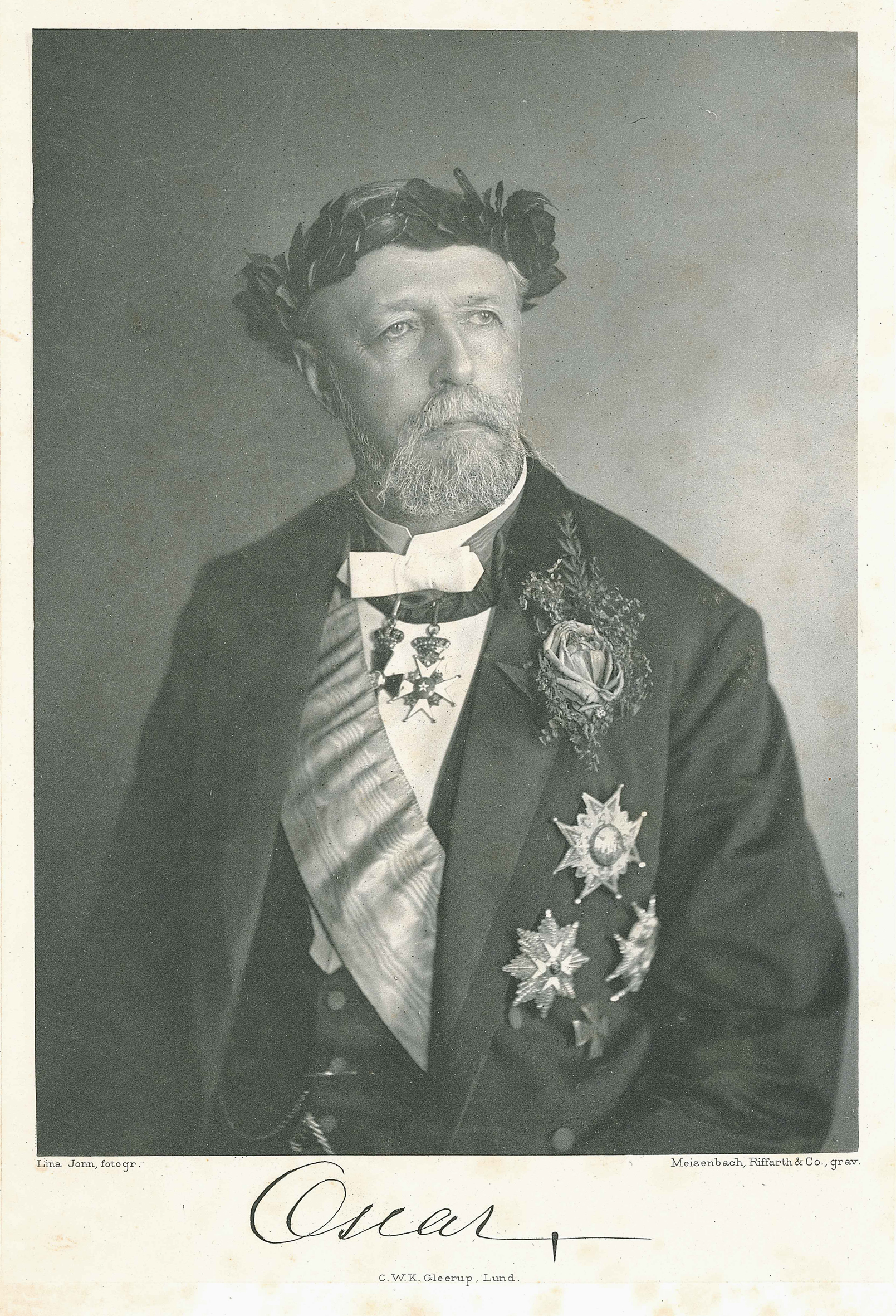
Photograph of King Oscar II of Sweden taken by Lina Jonn in 1893

Lina Jonn, birth name Carolina Johnsson (8 March 1861 – 25 December 1896), was a Swedish professional photographer.

== Early life ==
Jonn was born as Carolina Johnsson on 8 March 1861 in Stora Råby near Lund in Scania, south-western Sweden. Daughter of the farmer Jons Johnsson and his wife Hanna Pålsdotter, she was the sixth of seven children. Her sisters included Hanna, photographer and entrepreneur Maria Jonn and artist Erika Jonn.

When she was 16, Jonn found work as a governess on an estate near Höör. After studying German and French for a short period in Lund, in 1879 she went to Neuchâtel, Switzerland, to continue her studies. In 1880, she moved to England where she taught music, languages and art. She contemplated becoming a physical education teacher but was unable to do so as a result of a back ailment. After spending a further period in Switzerland studying painting, she returned to Sweden where she became a photographer.

== Career ==
Jonn appears to have learnt photography in Paris but her first professional work was in the Swedish city of Helsingborg where she joined the Finnish photographer Per Alexis Brandt who ran a studio there. In 1891, she opened her own studio in Lund which soon attracted many influential customers. Portraits for family albums or for visiting cards were becoming increasingly popular at the time. Business prospered and Jonn received several awards for her work.

In 1893, while on holiday in Norway with her sister Erika, Jonn met her husband to be, Gudbrand Ole Tandberg, a Norwegian farmer. Impressed by his earnest, knowledgeable and idealistic approach, she was immediately taken by him although he was 16 years her senior. They married in 1895. Her sister Maria Jonn took over running the photography business, retaining the name Lina Jonn for its high quality reputation.

The following year Lina, gave birth to a son, John. Some two months later, on 25 December 1896, she died of heart failure at the age of 35. Her newborn son was sent to Sweden to live with his aunts Erika, Maria and Hannah, who raised him in Lund. John Tandberg (1896–1968) grew up to be a physicist, industrial chemist, author and humorist.
