= Selma Jacobsson =

Swedish photographer (1841–1899)

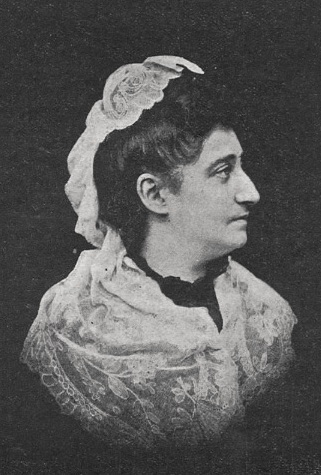
- Self portrait

Selma Ida Jacobsson (27 January 1841, in Stockholm – 30 March 1899, in Stockholm) was a Swedish photographer.

Selma Jacobsson was born to the merchant Levi Abraham Jacobsson and Sally Pohl, the sister of the opera singer Agnes Jacobsson and the architect Ernst Jacobsson, and married the Armenian linguist Norayr de Byzance in 1881.

She was a student of Bertha Valerius. She opened her own photographic studio in Stockholm in 1872. She was a successful photographer with clients within the diplomatic corps and high society. In 1899, she was appointed "Kungl. Hoffotograf" ('Photographer of the Royal Court').

== Gallery ==
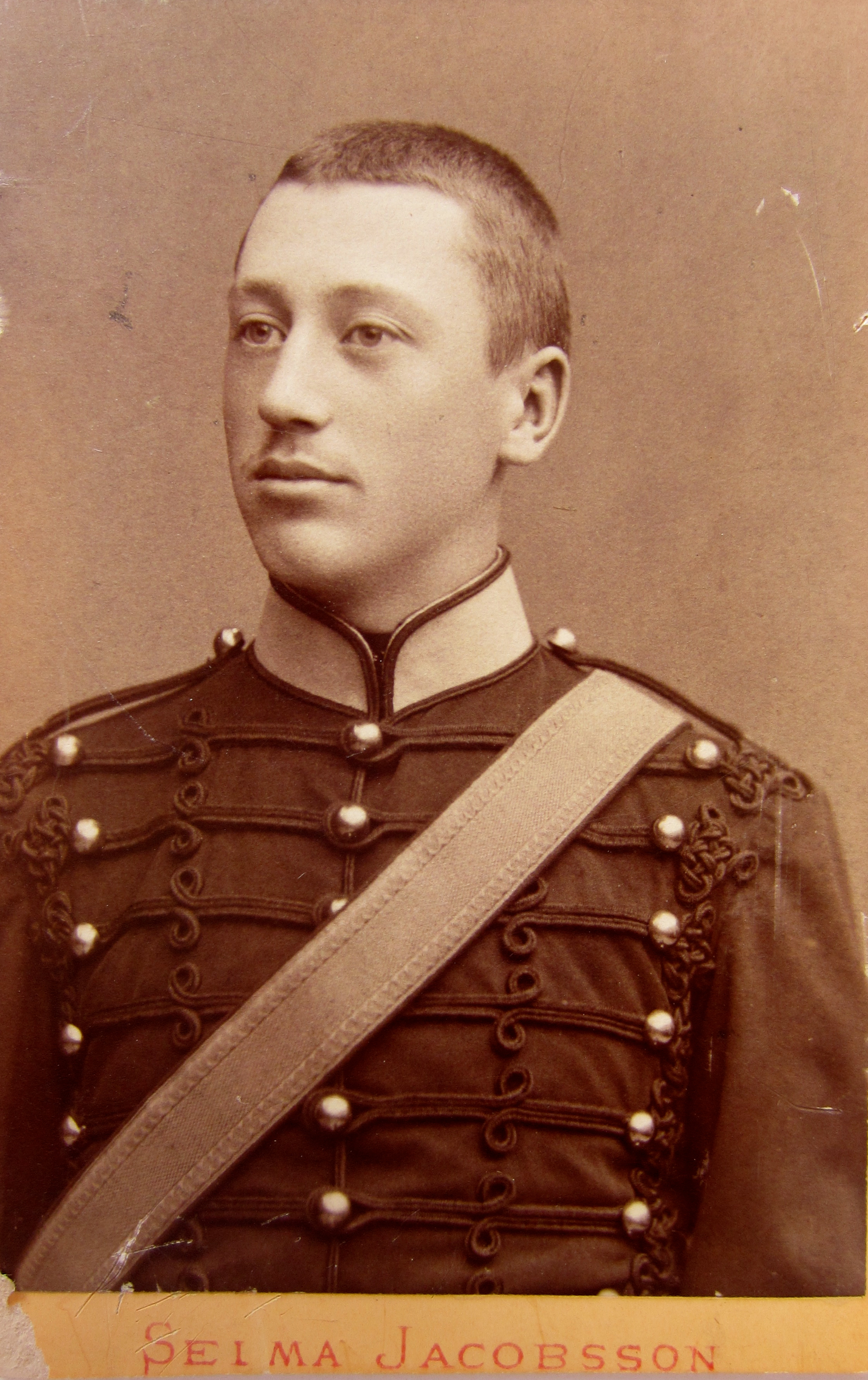
Allan Abenius.

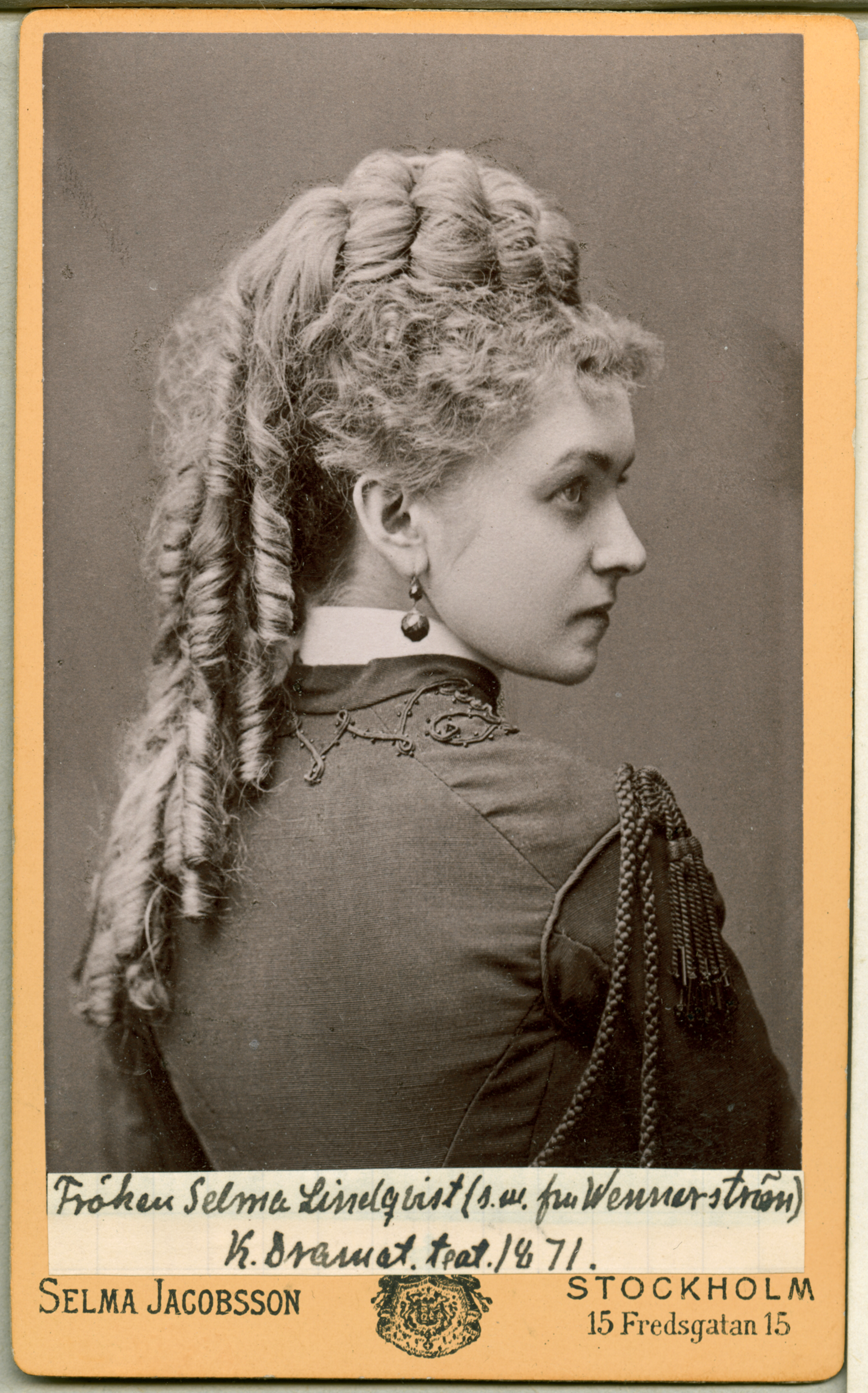
Zelma Lindqvist, actress.

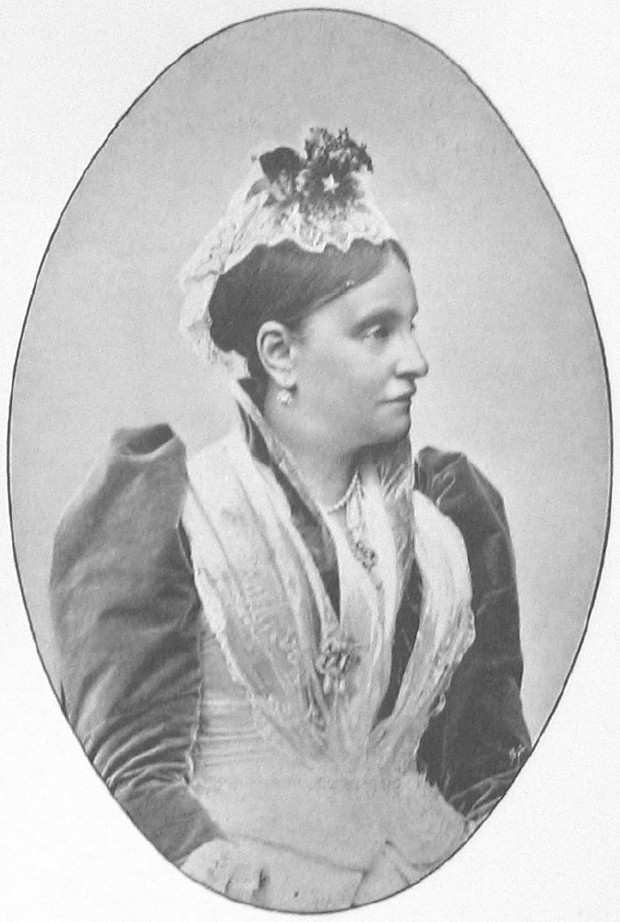
Princess Therese of Saxe-Altenburg
