= Wilhelmina Lagerholm =

Swedish artist (1826–1917)

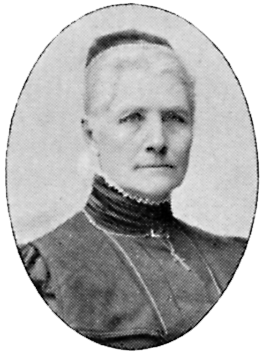
- Born: 25 March 1826; Örebro
- Died: 19 June 1917 (aged 91); Stockholm

Wilhelmina Catharina Lagerholm (1826–1917) was a Swedish painter and an early professional female photographer. After first studying and practising painting, she turned mainly to photography in 1862, opening a studio in Örebro in central Sweden.

== Life ==
Born on 25 March 1826 in Örebro, Lagerholm was the daughter of the surveyor Nils Fredrik Wilhelm Lagerholm and his wife Anna Elisabeth Ekman. She studied art in Stockholm, Paris and Düsseldorf, becoming proficient as a portraitist. From 1862 to 1871, she worked as a photographer in Örebro but then moved to Stockholm where she became a portrait and genre painter. In 1871, she became a member of the Royal Swedish Academy of Arts.

Lagerholm died in Stockholm on 19 June 1917. She is remembered as one of Sweden's earliest professional female professional along with Emma Schenson in Uppsala, Hilda Sjölin in Malmö and Rosalie Sjöman in Stockholm.

== Gallery ==
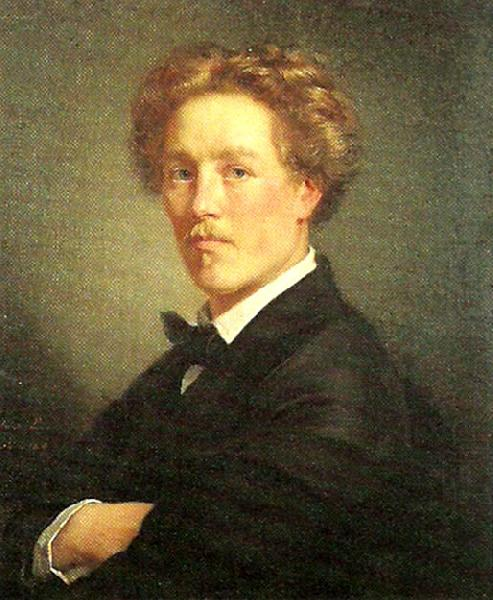
Lagerholm's oil portrait of Professor August Malmstrom.

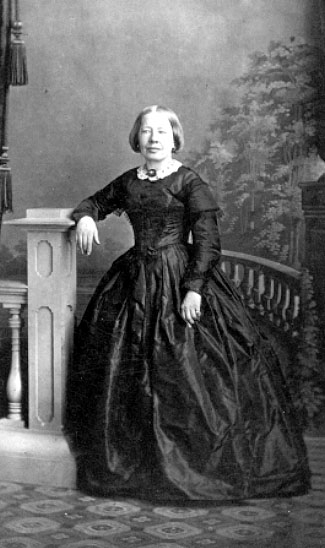
Lagerholm's photography of Emelie Risberg, 1862.
