= Horred =

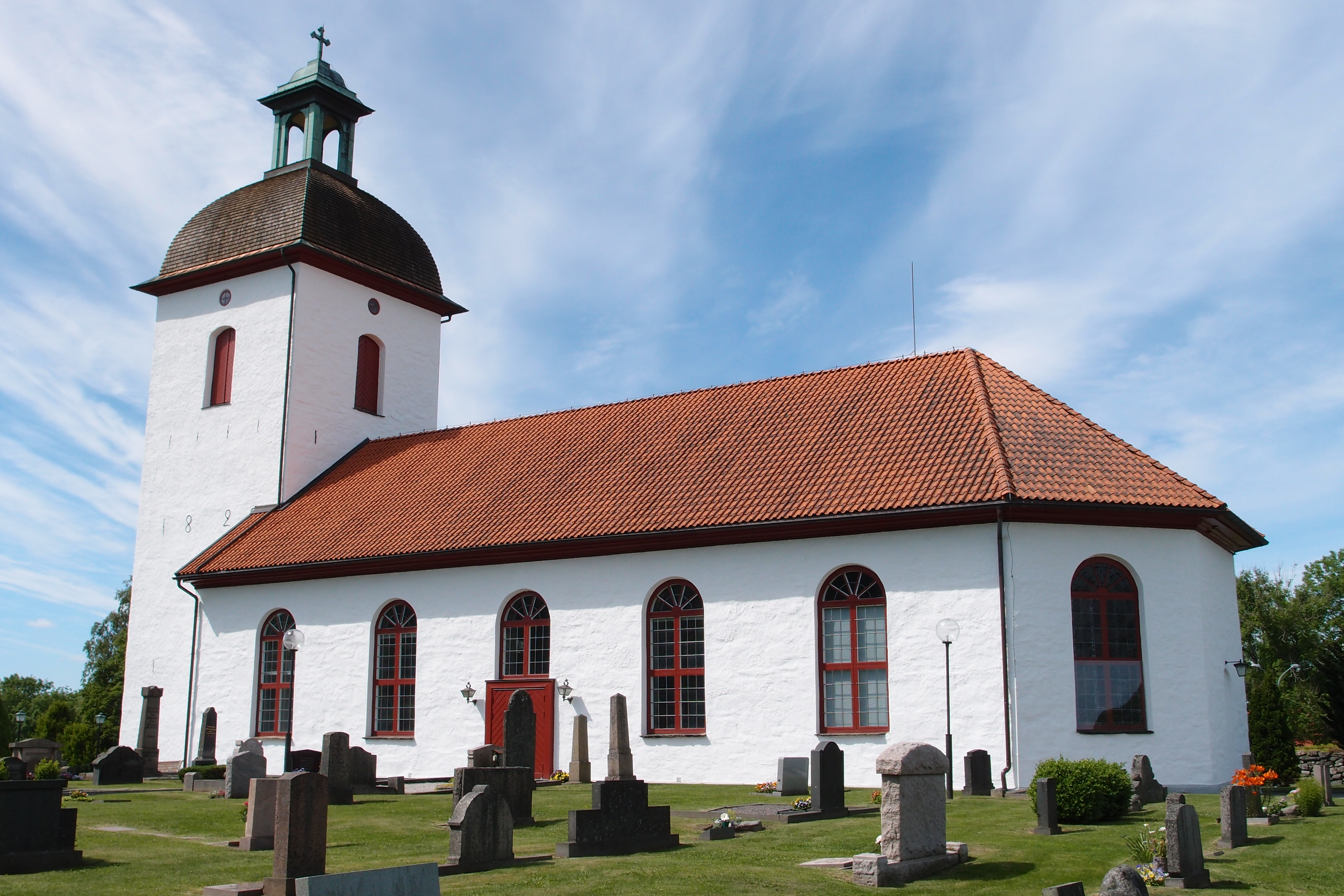

- Location within Västra Götaland Location within Sweden
- Coordinates: 57°21′N 12°28′E
- Country: Sweden
- Province: Västergötland
- County: Västra Götaland County
- Municipality: Mark Municipality

Area
  - Total: 1.53 km^{2} (0.59 sq mi)

Population (31 December 2010)
  - Total: 1,271
  - Density: 830/km^{2} (2,100/sq mi)
- Time zone: UTC+1 (CET)
  - Summer (DST): UTC+2 (CEST)

Horred (Swedish pronunciation: [ˈhʊ̌rːɛd]) is a locality situated in Mark Municipality, Västra Götaland County, Sweden. It had 1,271 inhabitants in 2010.
