= Erika Jonn =

Swedish painter (1865–1931)

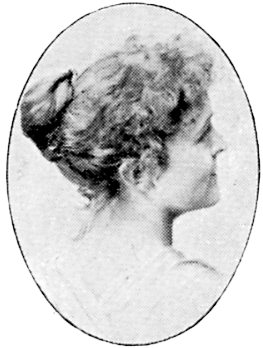
- Born: 9 August 1865; Stora Råby, near Lund
- Died: 1931 (aged 65–66); Lund
- Occupation: Artist

Erika Jonn (9 August 1865 – 1931), was a Swedish artist.

== Early life ==
Erika Jonn was born on 9 August 1865 in Stora Råby, near Lund, in Scania to Hanna (née Pålsdotter) and Jöns Johnsson who were tenant farmers. She was one of seven siblings in a close knit family, included sisters Lina Jonn and Maria Jonn, who both became photographers of some distinction.

In 1875 her father left farming and took on running a grist mill in Lund, but died suddenly in July and the family moved into Lund town. The young sisters were then placed in the guardianship of their older brother Jonas.

== Career ==
Jonn studied painting in Copenhagen and Paris at the Académie Colarossi and in Germany. She specialised in landscape and genre painting. Jonn travelled extensively in Europe and exhibited in Paris, but her work was not displayed in Sweden during her lifetime.

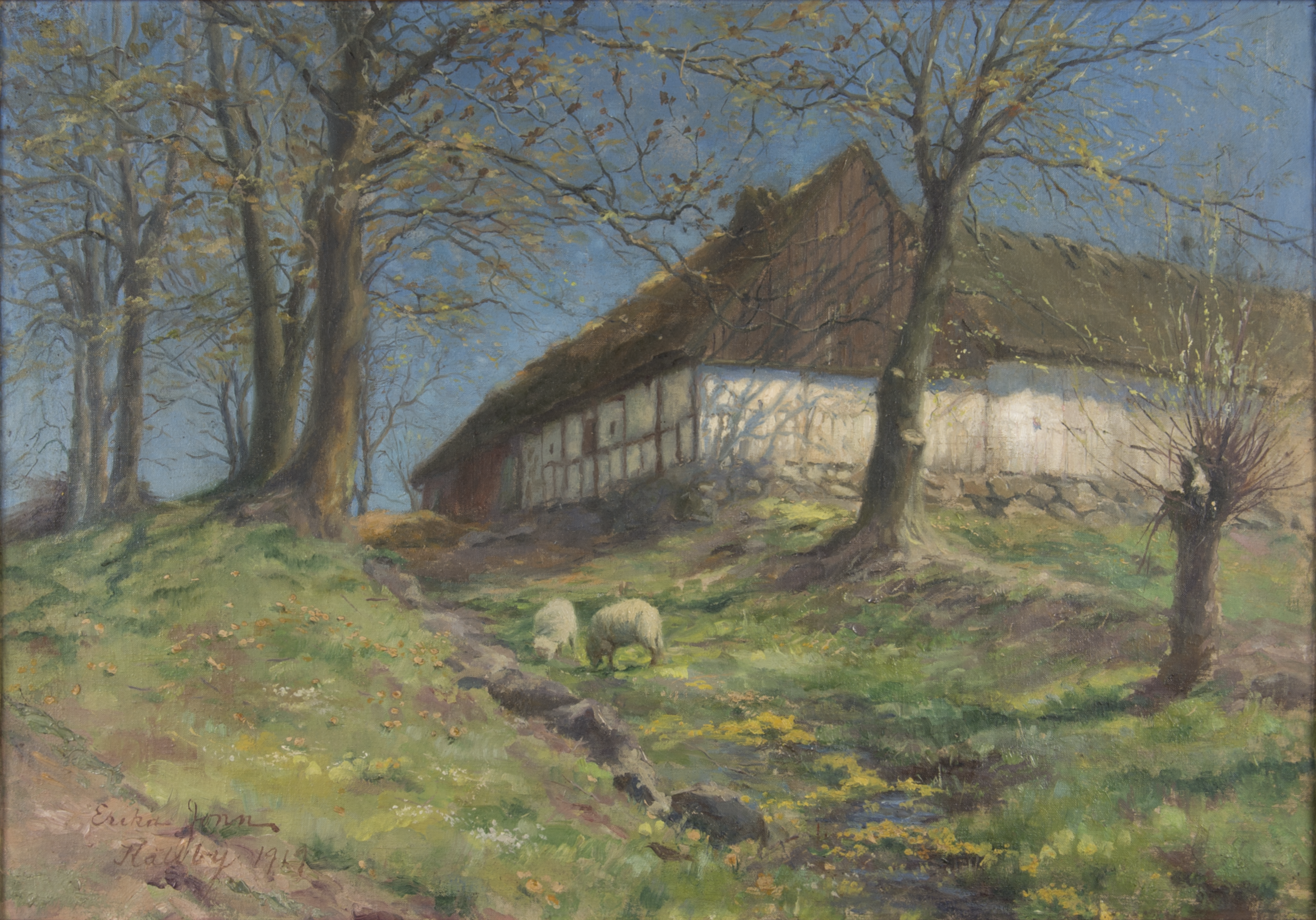
Farm in Skåne by Erika Jonn, held in Sweden's Nationalmuseum

Her work is now held in the collections of National Museum of Sweden.

== Personal life ==
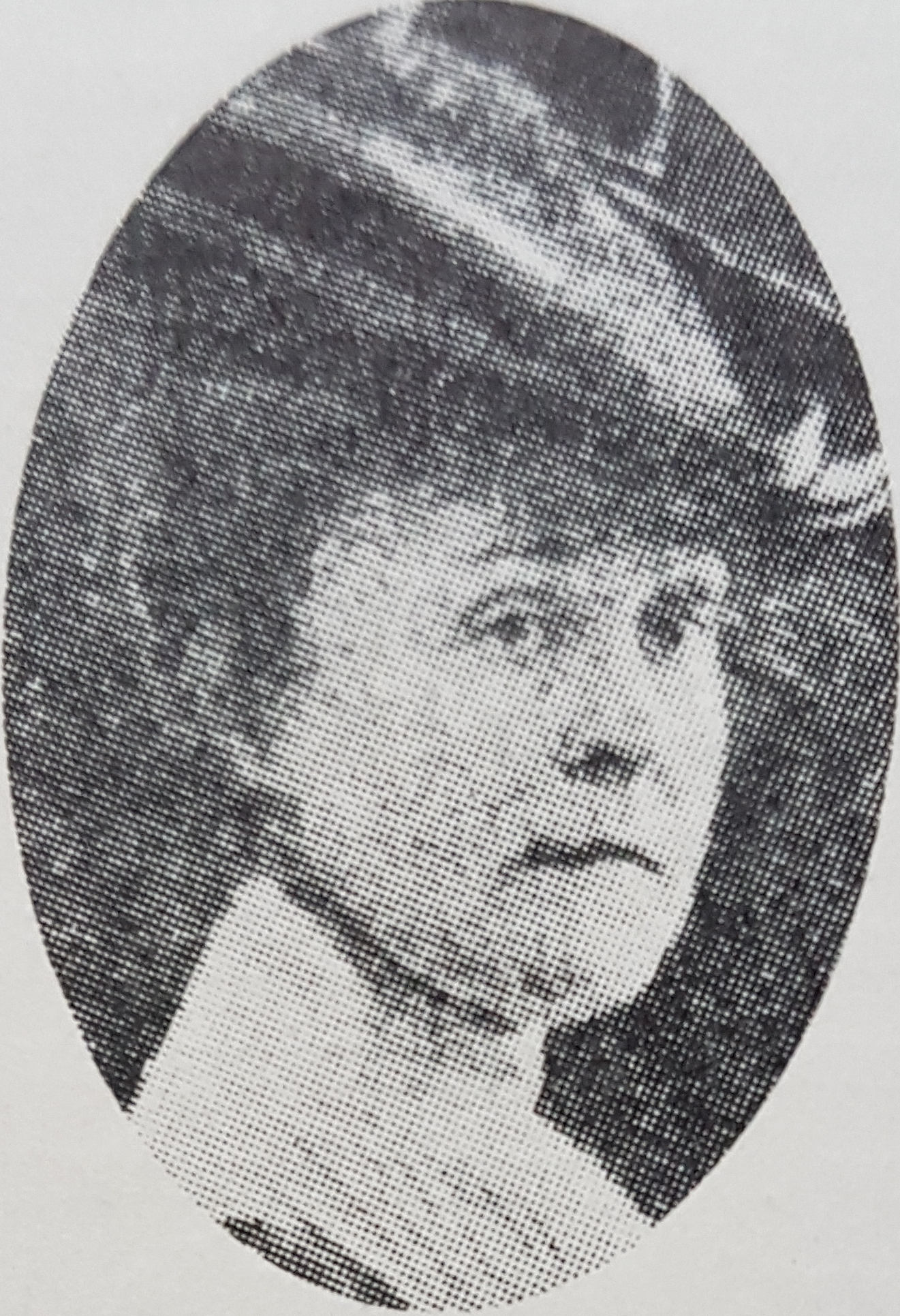
Erika Jonn in a photographic portrait from Allhem's Swedish Dictionary of Artists.

In the summer of 1893, Jonn travelled to Norway with her sister Lina. They stayed in Hönefoss at a boarding house run by Gudbrand Ole Tandberg. Lina Jonn and Tandberg fell in love and later married in December 1895. Erika was supportive of their marriage. Lina moved to Norway, handing over her photography business to Maria Jonn. Erika moved into her sister Maria's house and set up a studio there.

Lina had a child, John, in November 1896 but died of heart failure a few weeks later. The newborn John was sent to Lund in Sweden to live with his aunts Erika, Maria and Hannah, who raised him. John Tandberg (1896–1968) grew up to be a physicist, industrial chemist, author and humorist.

Erika Jonn died in Lund in 1931.
