= Marie Kinnberg =

Swedish photographer (1806–1858)

Marie Kinnberg (1806–30 March 1858) was a pioneering Swedish photographer and painter. In 1851, she learnt how to operate the daguerreotype process and the following year opened a studio in Gothenburg.

Active as a portrait painter, Marie Kinnberg was a student of Bernhard Bendixen and Adolf Meyer, two photographers from Germany, who introduced the then new photographic technique with pictures on paper in Sweden, and gave lessons in this technique during their stay in Gothenburg in the summer of 1851. Marie Kinnberg thus belonged to the pioneers of the new photographic technique in Sweden when she opened her own professional studio in Gothenburg on 8 May 1852. Her study did not last many years, but she was a pioneer both as one of the first to use the new photographic art in Sweden, as well as one of the first women of her profession alongside Brita Sofia Hesselius.
