= Hedvig Söderström =

Swedish photographer (1830–1914)

Hedvig Charlotta Söderström (1830–1914) was a Swedish photographer.

She was born to the janitor Carl Johan Söderström and Hedvig Christina Möller 1793. She was given some artistic instruction, and gave lessons to women in drawing in 1853–1854.

She is known as the first woman to open a photographic studio in Stockholm, in 1857. She was long referred to as the first professional female photographer in Sweden, but this distinction actually belongs to Brita Sofia Hesselius. Her studio closed in 1862 at the latest, since it was by then registered under the name of a male colleague. The same year, 1862, she is registered to be living with her brother, who was a merchant. She lived with her brother for five years, but after 1869, she is registered in the profession of an "artist".

She was also active as a draughtswoman, an illustrator and a painter. She participated with oil paintings in the exhibitions of Royal Swedish Academy of Fine Arts of 1856 and 1873. She is represented at the Nationalmuseum with a drawn portrait of a lady.
