= Bertha Valerius =

Swedish photographer, artist (1824–1895)

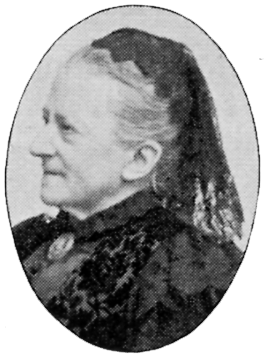
- Bertha Valerius, from the Svenskt Porträttgalleri
- Born: Aurora Valeria Albertina Valerius; 21 January 1824; Stockholm, Sweden
- Died: 24 March 1895 (aged 71); Stockholm, Sweden
- Known for: Painting, Photography
- Style: portraiture

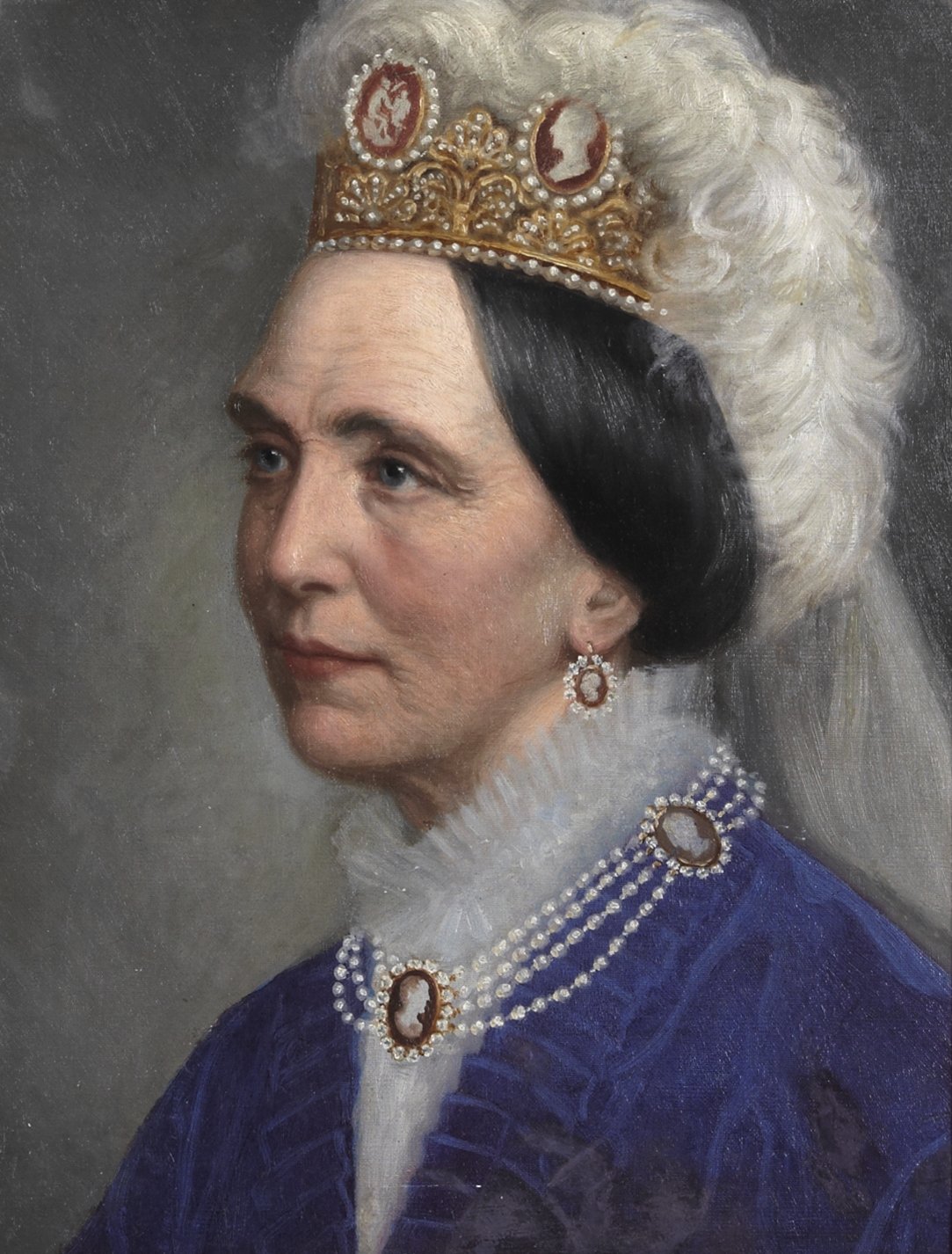
Portrait of Josephine of Leuchtenberg

Aurora Valeria Albertina Valerius, known as Bertha (21 January 1824, Stockholm – 24 March 1895, Stockholm), was a Swedish photographer and painter.

== Biography ==
Bertha Valerius was born to Chancellor Johan David Valerius, a member of the Swedish Academy, and Kristina Aurora Ingell. Her sister was the singer and painter Baroness Adelaïde Leuhusen.

Beginning in 1849, she studied at the Royal Swedish Academy of Fine Arts and received a scholarship to study in Düsseldorf, Dresden and Paris. Upon her return, she entered a career as a portrait painter. In 1853 and 1856, she participated in exhibitions at the Academy. Later, she had the opportunity to accompany her sister and the opera singer Christina Nilsson to Paris, acting as her chaperone. During her second stay in Paris, she became interested in photography and, upon her return in 1862, she opened her own studio in Stockholm; soon becoming one of Stockholm's most notable photographers.

In 1864, she was appointed official portrait artist of the Royal Court and produced 120 business cards for the Royal Family. At the exhibition in the Kungsträdgården in 1866, she was awarded an honorary diploma. From 1868 to 1872, her studio was in the Hotel de la Croix in Norrmalm. Sometime around 1880, she closed her studio and devoted herself to portrait painting. It was taken over by her colleague, the photographer Selma Jacobsson, who was also appointed royal photographer, in 1899.

One of her most popular, and often reproduced, images shows Jesus as a petitioner at the Edelweiss Chapel. She was involved in numerous charitable causes and, although not wealthy, donated over 150,000 Kronor to the needy over the course of her career.

Her works may be seen at the Royal Academy, Uppsala University Library, the Academy of Sciences and the Linköpings museum.
