= Caroline von Knorring =

Swedish photographer (1841–1925)

Caroline Gustafva Eleonora von Knorring (6 October 1841 – 4 August 1925) was a Swedish photographer and one of the first professional woman photographers in Sweden.

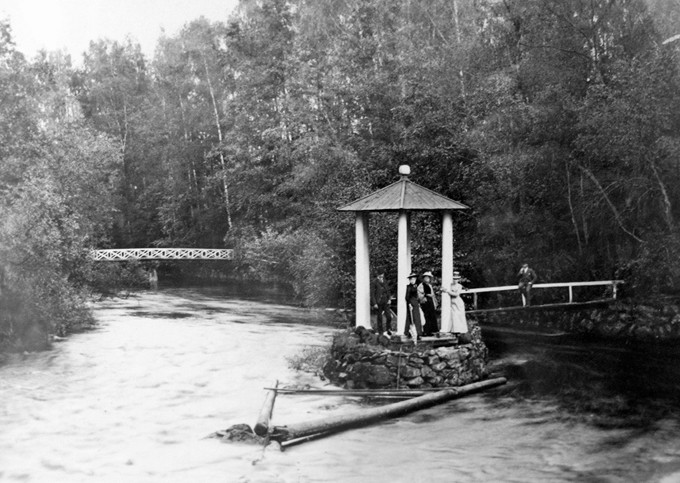
The premises of her mansion in Ludvika, probably photographed by her in the 1900s.

== Early life ==
Caroline von Knorring was born in Gothenburg, Sweden on 6 October 1841 to Major and Baron Gustaf Isak von Knorring, a member of the von Knorring noble family. When her father failed in business, she was encouraged to take up photography as a profession, as it was considered a respectable trade.

== Career ==
Von Knorring moved from Gothenburg to Stockholm and opened a photo studio at Jakobsbergsgatan, which she ran between 1864 and 1871. Of Stockholm's one hundred registered photographers in the 1860s, there were only 15 women. She participated at the Industrial Exhibition in Stockholm in 1866.

== Personal life ==
In 1872, she married Ehrenfried Roth, a wealthy politician. After marriage, she closed her studio in Stockholm and moved to a mansion in Sunnansjö. At Sunnansjö, she photographed landscapes for pleasure. She lived there until the death of her husband in 1905. Following her husband's death, she moved to Ludvika mansion, and used the Sunnansjö mansion as her summer residence. Caroline von Knorring died in 1925 and her remains rest in Roths' family grave at Ludvika Ulrica church's cemetery.

== Notable photographs taken by von Knorring ==
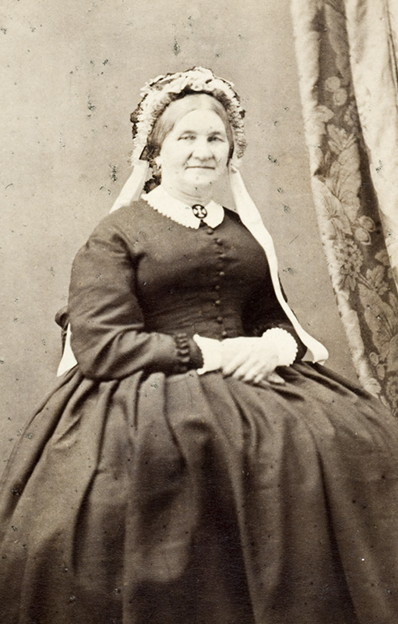
Amalia Spaak

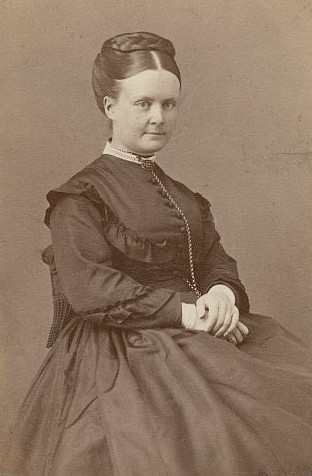
Unknown woman

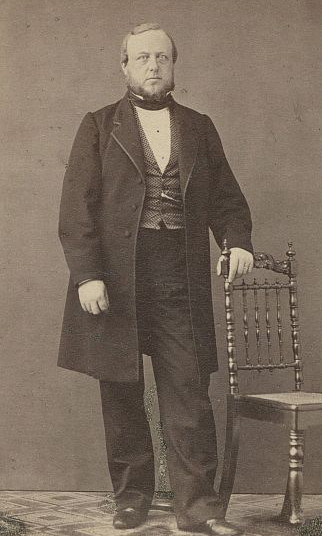
Carl Edward Roth
(her brother-in-law)

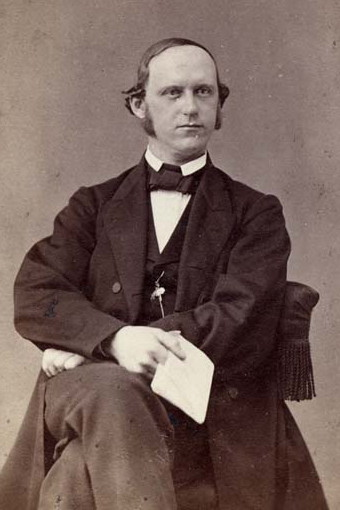
Frans Huss

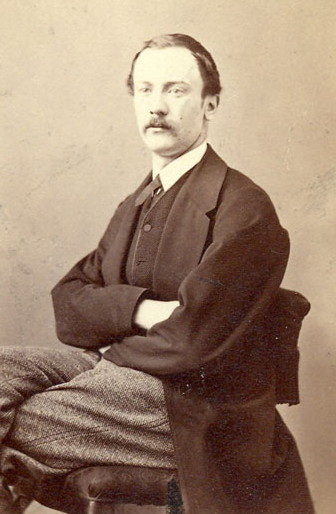
Unknown man

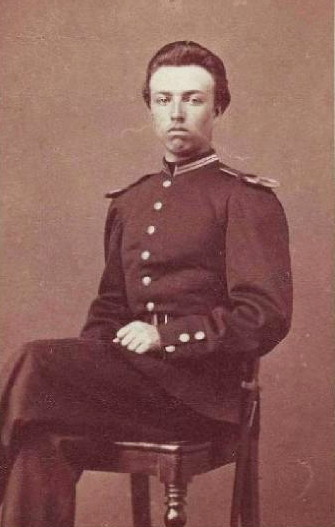
Gustaf Fredrik Wistrand
