= Hélène Edlund =

Swedish photographer

Hélène Sofie Edlund (20 October 1858 – 30 June 1941) was a Swedish photographer.

In the 1890s, Edlund collaborated with Artur Hazelius documenting the buildings and nature of Skansen.

Her nineteenth century photographs of folk costume are used to decorate locker doors in the Nordic Museum.
