= Brita Sofia Hesselius =

Swedish photographer (1801–1866)

- Born: 1801; Alster parish in the Karlstad Municipality, Sweden
- Died: 1866 (aged 64–65); Menton, France
- Citizenship: Sweden
- Occupation: Photographer

Brita Sofia Hesselius (1801–1866) was a Swedish daguerreotype photographer. She was likely the first professional female photographer of her country.

Hesselius was born in Alster parish in the Karlstad Municipality as the daughter of Olof Hesselius, inspector of an estate, and Anna Katarina Roman. From 1845 to 1853, she managed a girl school in Karlstad. In parallel, she was active with a daguerreotype photographic studio. She was as such the first professional female photographer of her country: before Hedvig Söderström, the first female photographer who opened a studio in Stockholm in 1857, who was long believed to be the first, and prior to Marie Kinnberg, who performed photography as an assistant and student of Bendixen and Adolph Meyer in Gothenburg in 1851.

Hesselius was additionally one of the first professional photographers in Sweden at all, as she was active but a few years after Johan Adolf Sevén opened the first photographic studio in Sweden in 1841, and one of the first female professional photographers in the world, active only shortly after Bertha Beckmann.

Hesselius also performed portraits in oil. In 1853, she moved her studio and school to Stockholm. She eventually settled in France, where she died in Menton.
