= Svante Kede =

Swedish artist and painter (1877–1955)

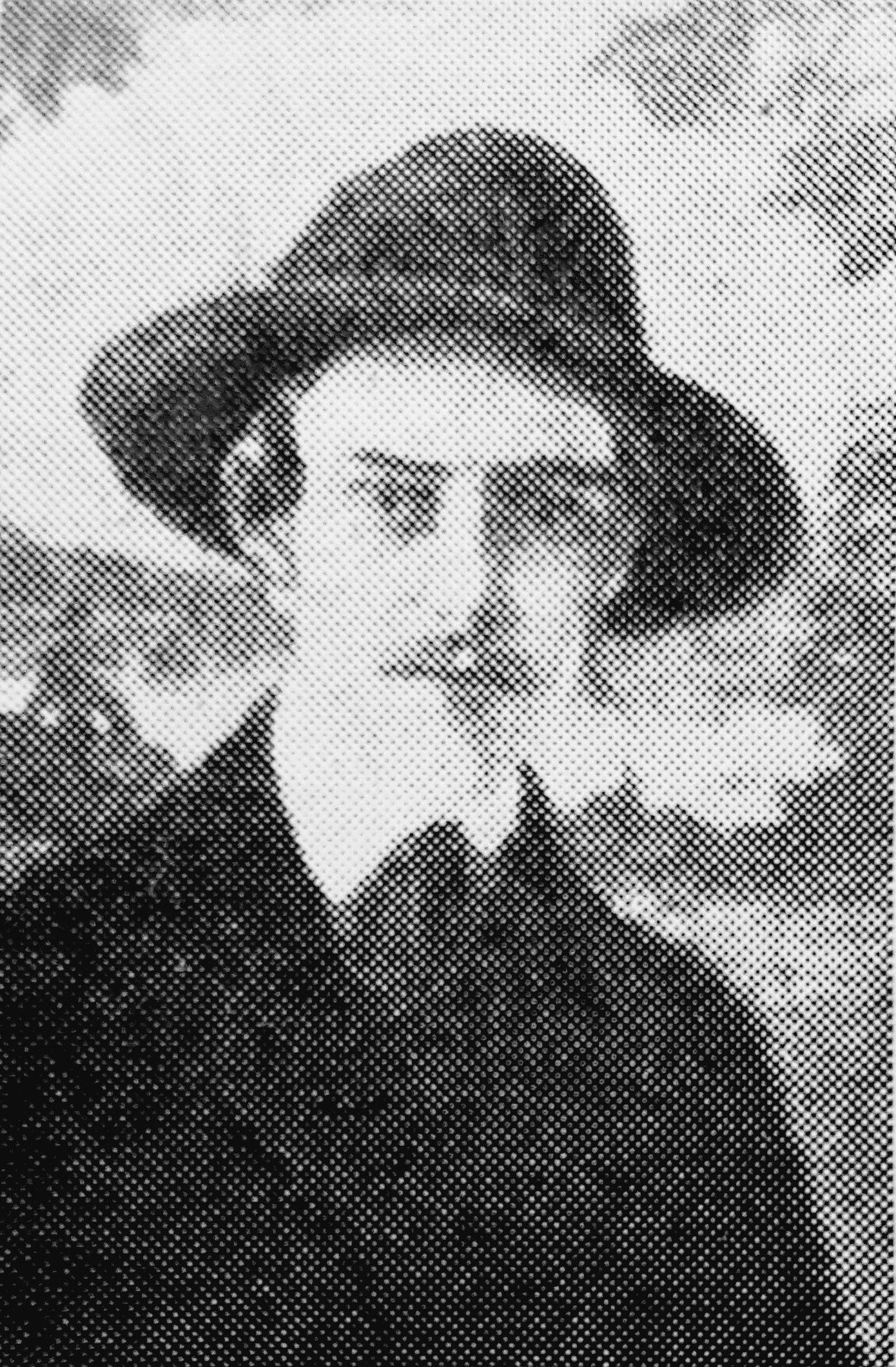
Kede

Svante Gustav Adolf Kede (1877–1955) was a Swedish artist and painter.

Kede was born in Stockholm. He studied in Paris from 1904 to 1908. Some of his artist friends while studying in Paris were Erik Tryggelin, David Wallin, Otto Strandman, Svante Nilsson, and Fritz Lindström. Lindström was already then a member of Rackstad colony artists, Rackengruppen in Värmland in Sweden, where Gustaf Fjaestad was the leading artist.

He also spent some time in Tahiti in the 1920s. He made trips to Spain, Morocco and the Pacific Islands. Kede has painted landscapes and figure motifs from Spain and Northern Africa, the mountains of Lapland and landscapes, and figure motifs from Tahiti.

Kede died in Stockholm. He is represented in Nationalmuseum in Stockholm, Moderna Museet i Stockholm and the art museums Norrköpings konstmuseum in Norrköping, Västerås konstmuseum in Västerås, and Karlskrona konstmuseum in Karlskrona.

== Sources ==
- Svante Kede in Konstnärslexikonett Amanda (Swedish)
