= Konstnärsförbundets skola =

Former art school in Stockholm, Sweden

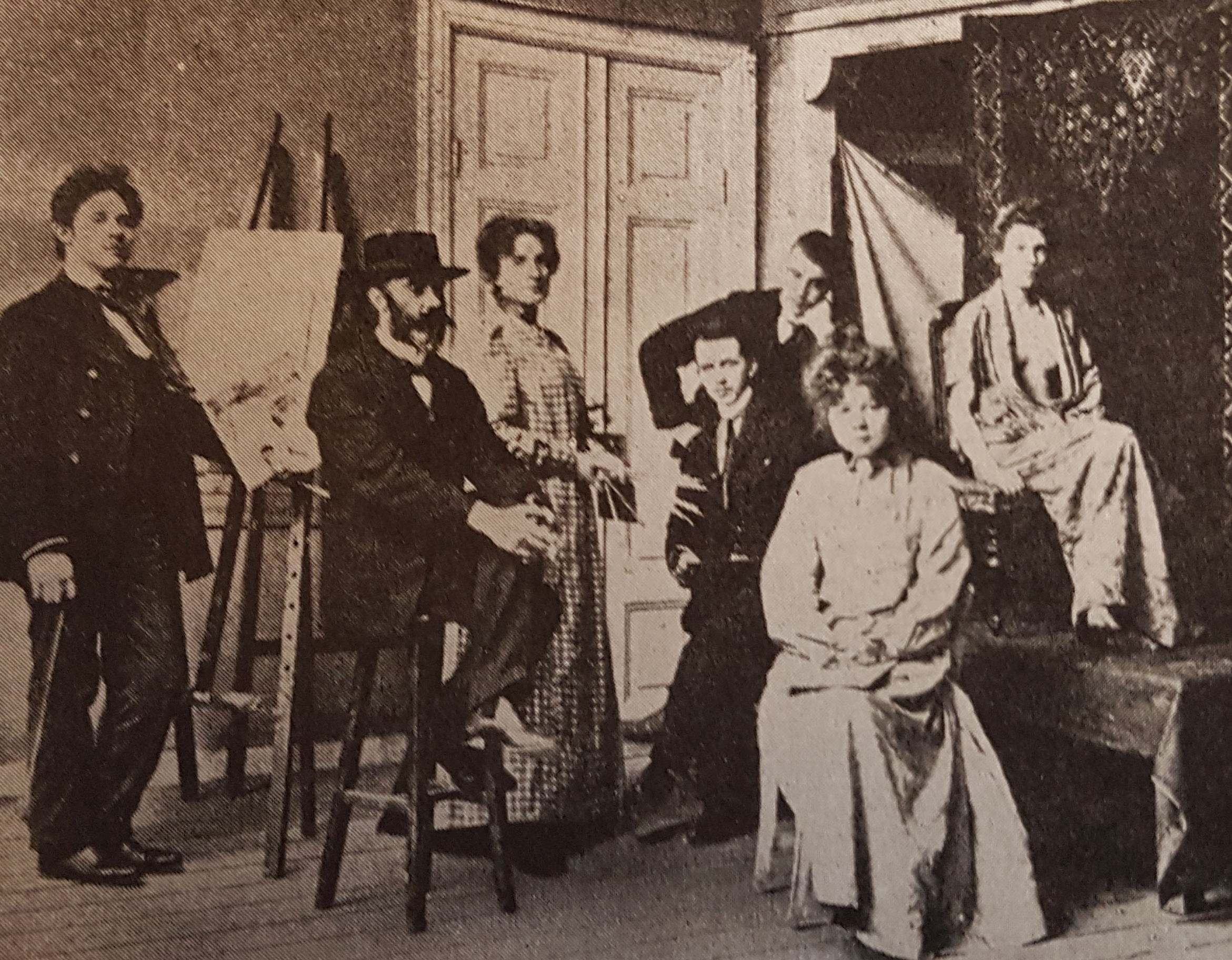
Richard Bergh at the Konstnärsförbundets skola

Konstnärsförbundets skola was a painting school in Stockholm, Sweden, which was offered by Konstnärsförbundet ('the Artists' Society') 1890–1908. The latter association was in turn established in opposition to the Royal Swedish Academy of Fine Arts. One of the school's co-founders was Richard Bergh. The school had several well-known teachers, including Anders Zorn, Nils Kreuger and Karl Nordström, in addition to Bergh himself. Several of the alumni would distinguish themselves on the contemporary Swedish visual arts scene. The group De unga, for example, consisted mainly of pupils from the school.

== First school 1890–1896 ==
In 1886, Konstnärsförbundets skola was formed due to dissatisfaction with the Royal Swedish Academy of Fine Arts. With this came a desire for an independent art school. In Denmark there were already two art schools outside the academy, Krøyer's and Zahrtmann's schools. Konstnärsförbundet therefore decided to start teaching and Richard Bergh would be the one to lead it. As a teacher, he was considered generously oriented in his relations with the students, although according to Axel Erdmann, he "reasoned incomprehensibly learnedly about complementary colours and colour clashes that few conceive of...". The school distinguished itself by letting the pupils take the initiative and teaching was done through a continuous discussion of their work. Pupils who felt they could afford it had to contribute to the cost of rent and heating.

The first school in 1890–1896 was run by Bergh. Patrons such as Eva Bonnier, Prince Eugen, Pontus Fürstenberg and Ernest Thiel sponsored the school. A quarter of the pupils, ten in number, were women.

=== Teachers ===
- Richard Bergh
- Anders Zorn
- Per Hasselberg

=== Selected students ===
- Aron Gerle
- Fritz Lindström
- Björn Ahlgrensson
- Ester Almqvist
- Maja Fjæstad née Hallén
- Albert Engström
- Ivan Aguéli
- Gösta von Hennigs
- Axel Erdmann
- Olof Sager-Nelson
- Artur Bianchini
- Berta Wilhelmson
- Harriet Sundström
- Eva Löwstädt-Åström

== Second school 1899–1901 ==
The school was run by Bergh and sponsored by Zorn, Fürstenberg and Messrs Lamm.

=== Selected students ===
- Ivar Arosenius
- Gerhard Henning
- Fritz Kärfve
- Bror Lindh
- Hilding Nyman
- Helmer Osslund
- Gerhard Gyllenhammar
- Hilding Werner

== Third school 1905–1908 ==
The school was run by Bergh. Robert Thegerström made himself unpopular and was forced to resign as a teacher. Several of the students from this last group went on to form De unga and exhibited their work at Hallin's art shop in Stockholm in 1909. This is often regarded as the breakthrough of modernism in Swedish art. The last school had 31 men and nine women.

=== Teachers ===
- Richard Bergh
- Christian Eriksson
- Aron Gerle
- Eugène Jansson
- Nils Kreuger
- Karl Nordström

=== Students ===
- Eva Adler-Arosenius-Dich
- Einar Almgren
- Gregori Aminoff
- Ture Ander
- Kristian Anderberg
- Tor Bjurström
- Henry Bonnevie
- Albert Eldh
- Leander Engström
- Elsa Giöbel-Oyler
- Isaac Grünewald
- Jane Gumpert-Ullman
- Edward Hald
- Albert Hoffsten
- Eva Jancke-Björk
- Knut Janson
- Einar Jolin
- Hadar Jönzén
- Brita Lagerström-Hald
- Brita Liljefors-Haquinius
- Erik Lindwall
- Ragnar Ljungman
- August Lundberg
- Gunnar Lundh
- Gotthard Lundquist
- Einar Nerman
- Arvid Nilsson
- William Nording
- Aram Norrman (according to Einar Nerman)
- Arvid Olson
- Arthur Percy
- Erik Rafael-Rådberg
- Carl Ryd
- Artur Sahlén
- Anna Sahlström
- Gösta Sandels
- Birger Simonsson
- Ingrid Günther
- Milly Slöör
- Gabriel Strandberg
- Berta Strömberg
- Per Tellander
- Sigfrid Ullman
- Filip Wahlström

Carl Kylberg was enrolled but fell ill a few days before the start of school.
