= Anna Sahlström =

Swedish painter and graphic artist

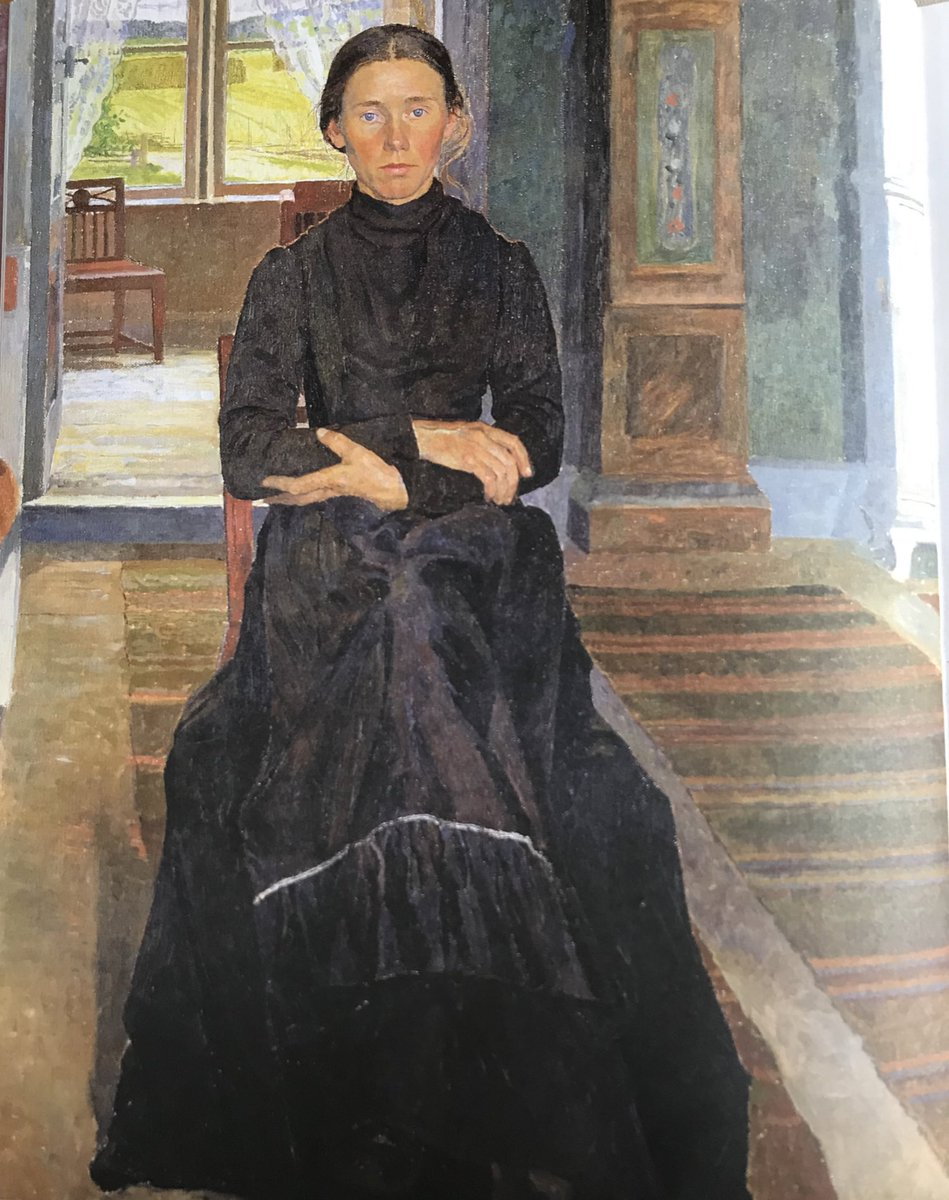
Portrait of Anna Sahlström by Carl Wilhelmson (c. 1901)

Hanna (Anna) Maria Sahlström (1876–1956) was a Swedish painter and graphic artist. In 1905, she began studying under Richard Bergh and Karl Nordström at the school run by the Artists' Association (Konstnärsförbundet), later developing expertise in woodcuts under Tekla Nordström. By 1911, she could exhibit her work in Gothenburg and at the Art Academy. Emulating Paul Gauguin and Wassily Kandinsky, she adopted an abstract, stylized approach. Sweden's Nationalmuseet has 15 of her woodcuts in its collection.

== Biography ==
Born on 7 January 1876 on a farm near Fryksände, Hanna Maria Sahlström was the daughter of the forester and politician Per Sahlström (1834–1917) and his wife Marit née Nilsdotter. She was one of the family's eight children. After attending her village school and the girls' school in Karlstad, it was not until 1905 that thanks to the efforts of her brother Bror, who was a designer, that she was able to begin painting classes with Richard Bergh at the Konstnärsförbundet school. She was one of several women studying at the school at the time, such as Elsa Giöbel-Oyler and Eva Jancke-Björk. Her teacher Karl Nordström encouraged her to develop her engraving skills in order to create woodcuts. As a result, she trained under Tekla Nordström. Still interested in painting, from 1907 she spent a couple of years furthering her training in painting under Karl Nordstöm.

For the rest of her life, she created both paintings and woodcuts. While her paintings were mainly portraits, her woodcuts depicted landscape scenes including Myr (1910), Skära hafre (1912), Fårklippning (1915) and Regnet hotar (1930). As for portraits, she is remembered for those of Carl Wilhemson, for example Wilhelmson lägger upp Juniafton (1900) while Wilhemson painted several of her, using her as a model. Her works are in the collections of museums in Sweden and abroad, including Nationalmuseet which has 15 of her woodcuts in its collection.

Anna Sahlström died on 13 February 1956 in Torsby, aged 80.
