= Fjæstad =

Fjæstad is a surname. Notable people with the surname include:

- Gustaf Fjaestad (1868–1948), Swedish artist
- Maja Fjæstad (1873–1961), Swedish artist
