= Erik Tryggelin =

Swedish artist, drawer and photographer (1878–1962)

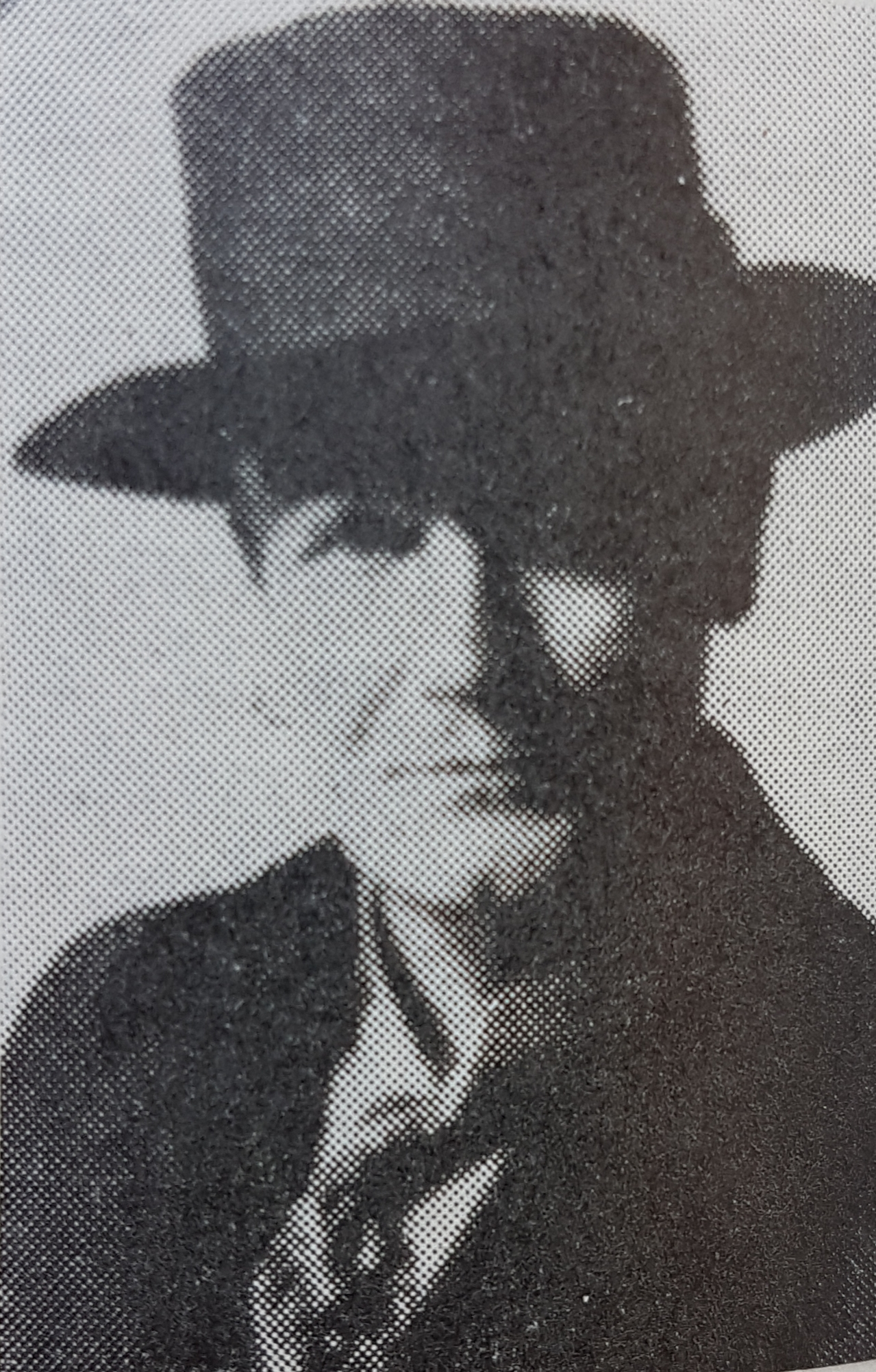
Erik Tryggelin, photographed image from Allhem's Swedish artists' dictionary.

Erik Viktor Tryggelin, born 25 June 1878 in Stockholm, died 9 August 1962 in Stockholm, was a Swedish artist, drawer and photographer.

== Biography ==
Erik Tryggelin studied at the Royal Swedish Academy of Arts (Konstakademien) in Stockholm. Then he studied in Paris for some time, during the period of October 1911 until January 1913. In Paris he lived a normal artists' life with his Swedish fellows, for instance David Wallin (1876–1957), Svante Kede (1877–1955), Otto Strandman (1871–1970), Fritz Lindström (1874–1962) and Svante Nilsson (1869–1942).

In Paris he accompanied the art scene and he discovered modernism. In the springtime of 1912 he went to the gallery Bernheim-Jeune and saw the futurists. In 1906 Galerie Bernheim-Jeune was installed in 25, Boulevard de la Madeleine in Paris. Originally an art dealer in Brussels, Alexandre Bernheim moved to Paris in the late 1880s. He opened a gallery there, where his two sons, Joseph, known as Josse, and Gaston, soon came to work. Josse and Gaston Bernheim ran the Paris art firm Bernheim-Jeune, established by their father Alexandre Bernheim. Around 1900, the gallery specialised in Impressionist paintings and the works of later artists. Closely associated with the Nabi painters, in particular Pierre Bonnard and Félix Vallotton – who in fact married one of their sisters – the two brothers not only sold, but also bought and collected many Nabi works. Later, they commissioned several family portraits from them. Among others Josse and Gaston exhibited and moreover Pierre Bonnard, Édouard Vuillard, Paul Cézanne, Georges Seurat, Kees van Dongen, Henri Matisse, Henri Rousseau (he was also known as Le Douanier, the customs officer), Raoul Dufy, Maurice de Vlaminck, Amedeo Modigliani and Maurice Utrillo exhibited. Galerie Bernheim-Jeune became the centre of the avant-garde of the 20th century. Erik Tryggelin also visited Gertrude Stein’s collection with works by Picasso and Matisse.

In Paris Erik Tryggelin also met Karl Isakson and John Sten, and he was surprised by their positive attitude. With the breakthrough of modernism he and his conservative fellows felt that their art was a thing of the past. The first world war vanished the Stockholm that he had portrayed with tender love. After the World War I he disappeared into anonymity, he lived as a bachelor, he was 84 years old.

Tryggelin mainly performed figurative compositions and cityscapes, often with fine evening mood, and with motifs often from Stockholm, Visby and Vadstena. He is a reporter and stroller and in his art you see the people first, and then you think of the environment.

== Represented ==
Among other places Erik Tryggelin is represented at

- Nationalmuseum, Stockholm
- Nordic Museum (Nordiska museet), Stockholm
- Stockholm City Museum (Stockholms stadsmuseum), Stockholm
- Uppsala University Library ( Uppsala universitetsbibliotek), Uppsala
