= Bror Lindh =

Swedish artist (1877–1941)

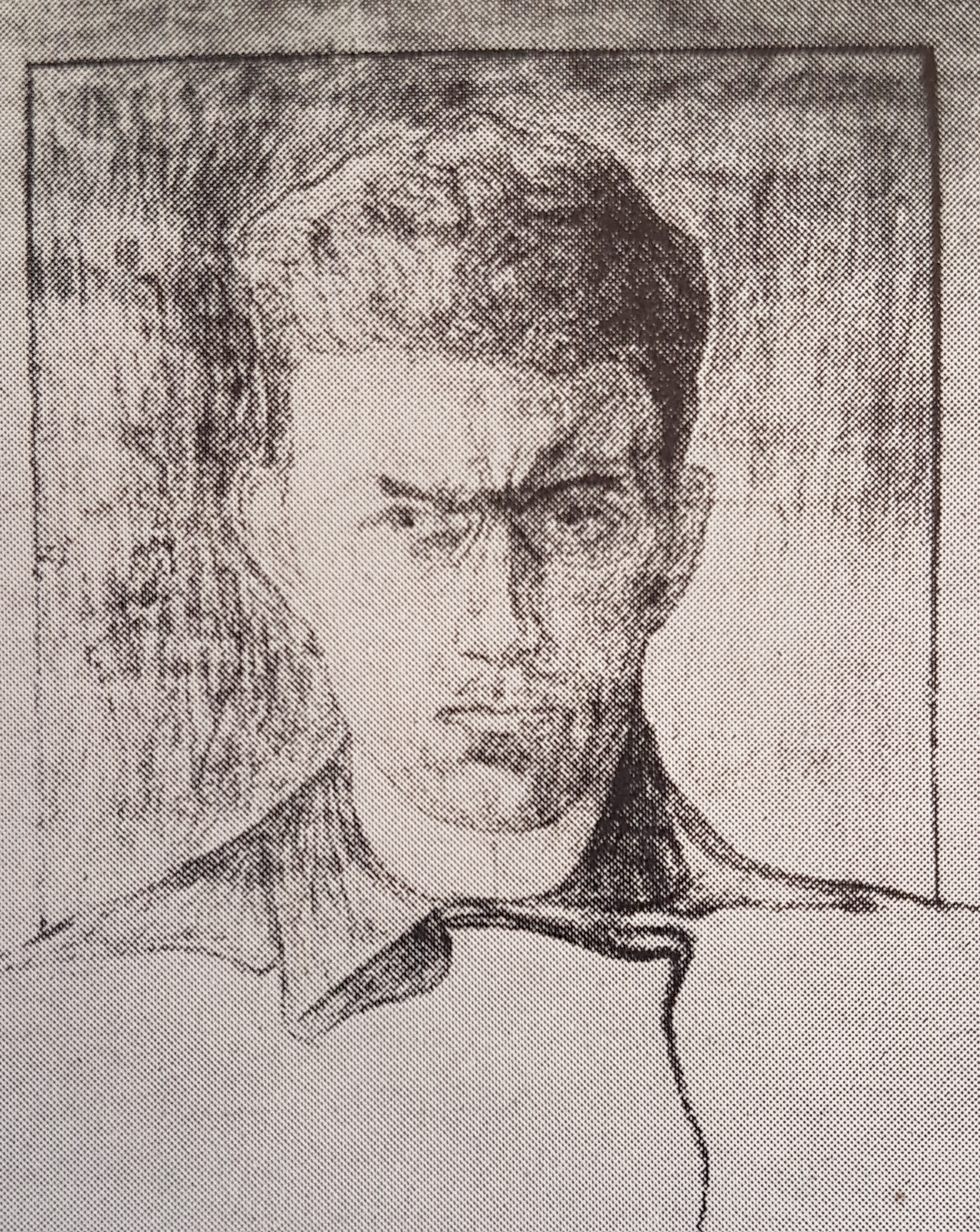
Self-portrait (date unknown)

Bror Johan Lindh, born Bror Jansson (19 July 1877 –6 February 1941) was a Swedish painter, graphic artist and cartoonist. He specialized in winter landscapes.

== Life and work ==
He was part of the Jansson family, whose members had worked as painters since the 1700s. His father, the artist Carl Jansson (1844-1914), added Lindh to their name during a trip to Stockholm in 1863. He had it legally changed a few years before his death.

His initial art lessons came from his father, a versatile craftsman who decorated homes and painted furniture. When he had learned his craft, he began working as a decorative painter at a shop in Arvika. He also continued serving as an assistant to his father. Later, he took professional lessons from the artist and designer, Gustaf Fjæstad, who was impressed by his talent, and recommended that he apply for admission at the Swedish Artists' Association painting school. He was accepted in 1899, but proved to be more interested in student life than studying.

While in Stockholm, he fell in love with Elsa Klein, a fashion critic for one of the local newspapers. She did not respond to his advances, and he was emotionally devastated. During this time, he had met Walter Hülphers, a journalist who expressed his desire to get away from civilization and devote himself to writing. Together, they moved to Värmland, where they swore a vow of chastity and poverty; reportedly subsisting on mushrooms and porridge. Lindh did, however, maintain contact with a nearby artists' colony called the Rackengruppen.

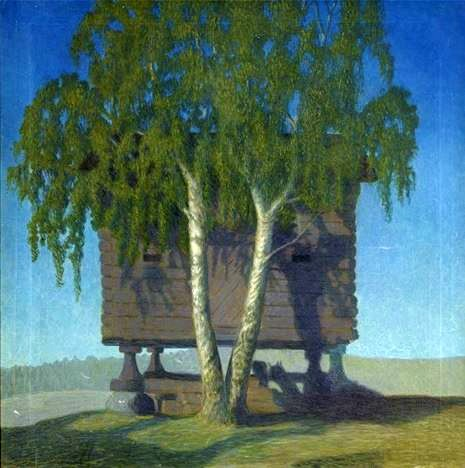
Shadow Play

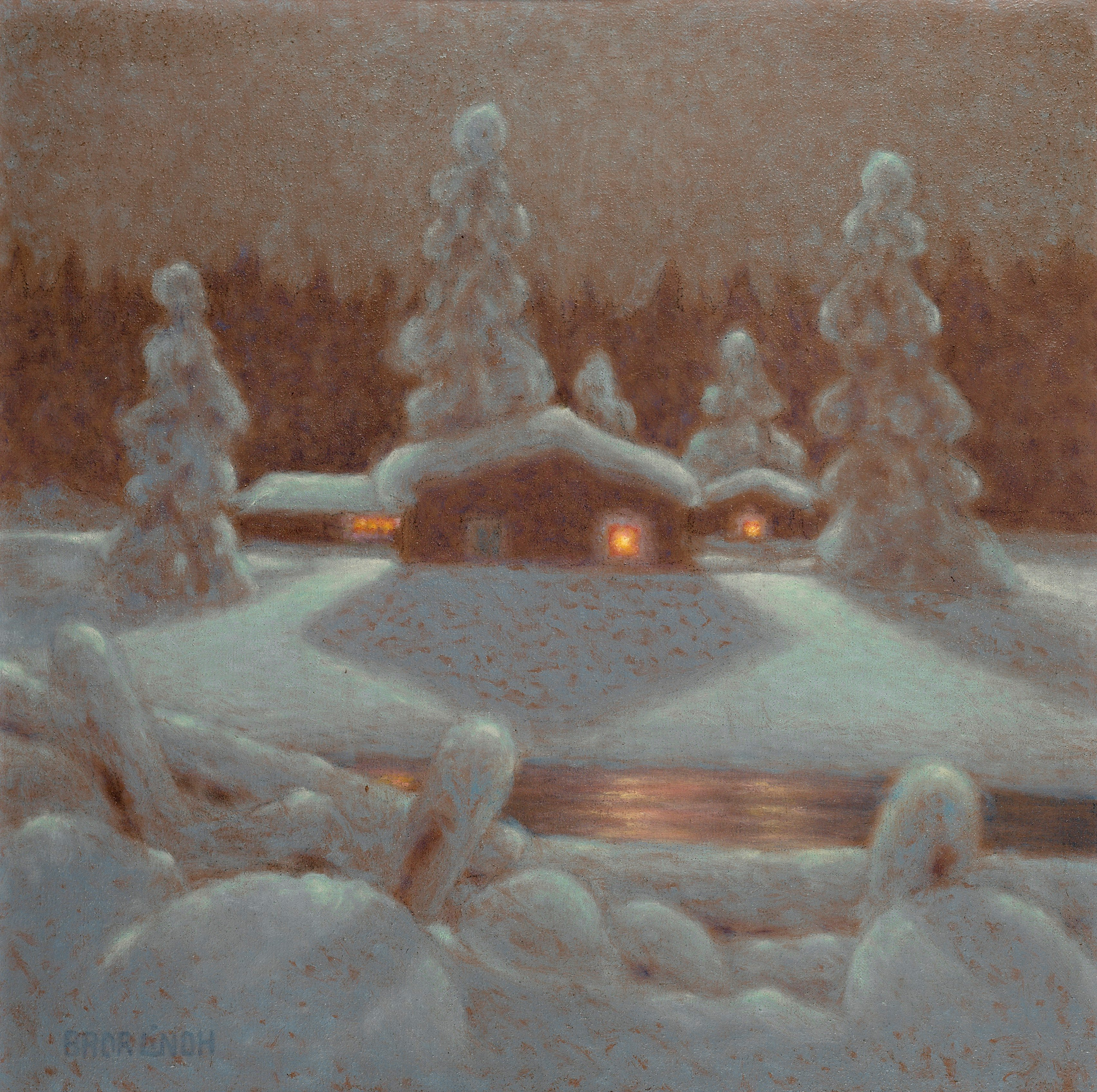
Winter Night

Hülphers would stay there for four years. Lindh began to emerge not long after, and began taking more lessons from Fjæstad, who was associated with the Rackengruppen. It was then that he developed his signature style, featuring muted colors. In the 1920s, for reasons that are unclear, he withdrew from social life and lived in isolation. In his final years, he was a virtual hermit, at an old farmhouse in Grönäs.

His works may be seen at the Moderna Museet, the Göteborgs Konstmuseum, and the Värmlands Museum.
