= Björn Ahlgrensson =

Swedish painter (1872–1918)

- Portrait of Ahlgrensson by Aron Gerle, 1899
- Born: Björn Emil Ahlgrensson; 5 August 1872; Stockholm, Sweden
- Died: 11 October 1918 (aged 46); Arvika, Sweden
- Notable work: The Twilight Glow
- Movement: Racken Group
- Spouse: Elsa Alexandra Lindström (m. 1901)

Björn Emil Ahlgrensson (5 August 1872 – 11 October 1918) was a Swedish painter associated with the Racken Group.

== Biography ==
Ahlgrensson was born in Stockholm on 5 August 1872 to singer Hilma Konstantia Hermanson and Fritz Ahlgrensson, a scenic painter employed by theatres.

A few years after his birth, the family relocated to Denmark, where his father found work for the Royal Danish Theatre. Following a dispute with the theatre's management, they again relocated to Paris. By age fourteen, Ahlgrensson's parents and sister, Inga Salwén, had returned to Sweden without him. Ahlgrensson practised violin and lived in a Bohemian environment throughout the following years, boarding with friends and a neighbouring family of musicians.

In 1890, Ahlgrensson returned to Sweden at the request of his mother. Subsequently, both of his parents would die of tuberculosis. To make ends meet, he began a career as a painter, studying under Carl Grabow, a family friend employed by the Royal Swedish Opera. He also befriended Fritz Lindström while the two attended evening classes together at the Artists' Association's painting school in Stockholm. At the advice of the Association's Richard Bergh, Ahlgrensson applied for a travel grant to Paris.

Upon his return to Sweden, he married Lindström's sister Elsa in 1901. The couple struggled financially. After meeting fellow artist Gustaf Fjæstad, they were given a set of keys to the home of sculptor Christian Eriksson in a village outside of Arvika. Ahlgrensson would find success as a portrait, landscape, and interior artist in the local Racken community. Following this success, the couple moved into a former schoolhouse nearby.

Later years of Ahlgrensson

Ahlgrensson developed a sense of isolation living in the countryside, and his paintings would take on a melancholic tone. He left his wife and friends to move between Copenhagen, Paris, Stockholm, Visby, and lastly the mountains of Jämtland. The change of scenery did not give him the inspiration he had hoped for, however, and he returned home in 1915. Not long after, he fell ill with tuberculosis and was committed to the Värmland County Sanatorium in Arvika, where he would die on 11 October 1918 of the Spanish flu, aged 46.

== Gallery ==
Landscape (1901)

The Shore (1902)

The Approach of Spring (1903)

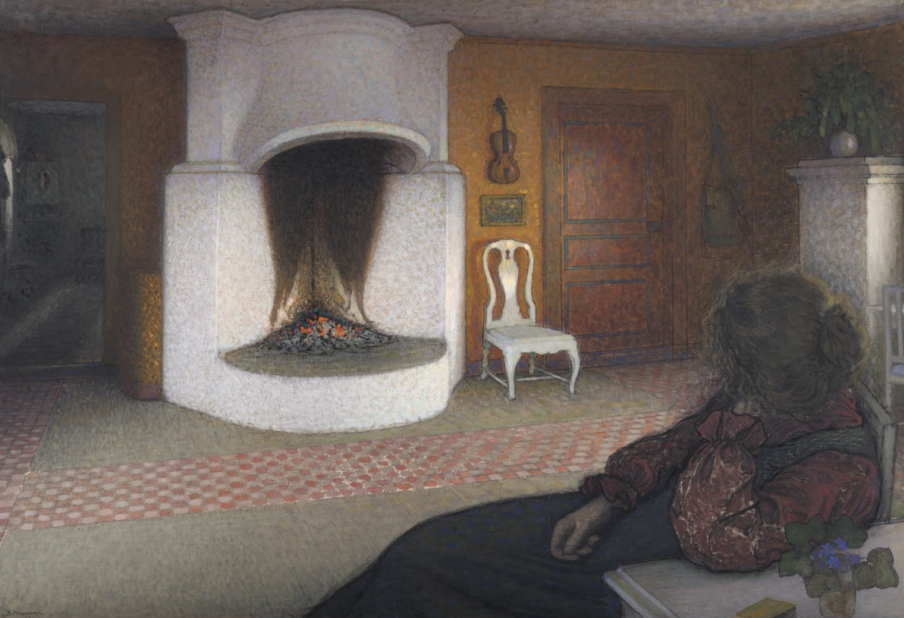
The Twilight Glow (1903)

It's Snowing Outside (1905)

Altarpiece in Trefaldighetskyrkan, Arvika (1911)

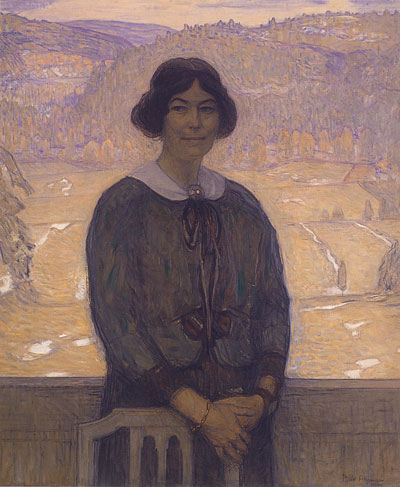
Portrait of Maja Fjæstad (1914)

Portrait of Ragnhild Franzén-Ander (c. 1914)
