= Svante Nilsson =

Svante Nilsson may refer to:

- Svante Nilsson (artist), a Swedish medal engraver, medal artist, lyricist and lute singer.
- Svante Nilsson (regent of Sweden) (1460-1512)
