= Ingesund College of Music =

University department in Arvika, Sweden

Coordinates: 59°37′47″N 12°35′22″E

- Musikhögskolan Ingesund
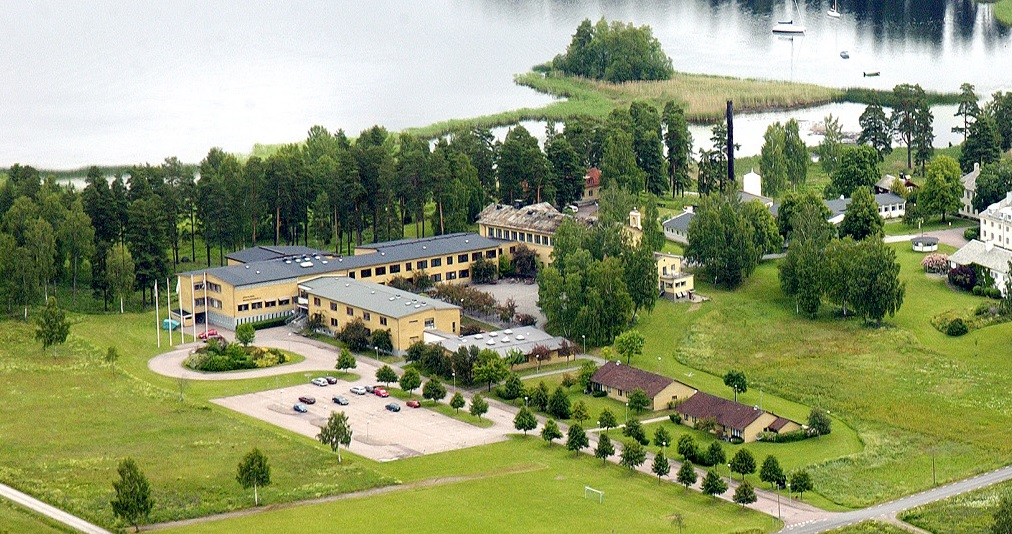
- The College in 2004
- Type: Public
- Established: 1923
- Affiliation: Karlstad University
- Location: Arvika, Värmland, Sweden
- Website: www.imh.se

Ingesund College of Music (Swedish: Musikhögskolan Ingesund) is located in Arvika in the Swedish province of Värmland. It is the music department of Karlstad University.

The college was founded in 1923 as a folk high school, run by a foundation. It became a university college under the County Council of Värmland County in 1978. It has been a department of Karlstad University since 2002.

The college trains music teachers, audio engineers and music therapists. It also gives high music education for singers and instrumentists with the Bachelor, Master and Artist Diploma programs. There are also preparatory education for students aiming to qualify for higher education in music.

The musical styles that are represented at the college are classical music, jazz, and traditional music.
