= Nils Kreuger =

Swedish painter (1858–1930)

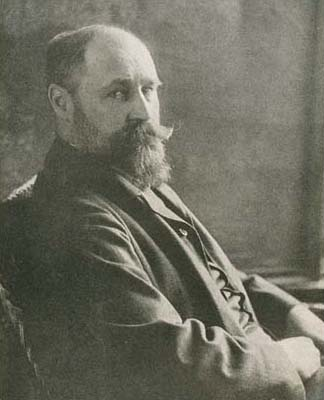
- Born: 11 October 1858; Kalmar, Sweden
- Died: 11 May 1930 (aged 71); Stockholm, Sweden

Nils Edvard Kreuger (11 October 1858 – 11 May 1930) was a Swedish painter. He specialized in landscapes and rural scenes.

== Biography ==
His father, Johan August (1821–1887), operated a lumber and wood products business. In 1874, he began his studies at the Royal Swedish Academy of Fine Arts, but was forced to discontinue them due to illness. In 1878, he was able to resume studying at the private painting school of Edvard Perséus. He then went to Paris, in 1881, and studied with Jean-Paul Laurens at the Académie Colarossi. Much of his time was spent painting en plein aire in Grez-sur-Loing. As his style progressed, he showed a preference for painting at dawn or dusk, in haze or rain. His first exhibition at the Salon came in 1882.

After 1885, he was a supporter of the Opponenterna, a group that was opposed to the outmoded teaching methods at the Royal Academy. He was also active in creating the Konstnärsförbundet (Artists' Union). At this time, he abandoned painting en plein aire in favor of Romantic nationalism. In 1886, he married Bertha Elisabeth von Essen (1857–1932), the daughter of an army officer, and settled in Bourg-la-Reine.

In 1887, he returned to Sweden, looking for a quiet place to paint, and chose Varberg, where he worked with Richard Bergh and Karl Nordstrom to establish what came to be known as the Varbergsskolan; a term coined by Prince Eugen, himself an amateur artist. It was a reaction to the prevailing realistic style of landscape painting and may have been inspired by Bergh's attraction to the works of Paul Gauguin. He was also influenced by Van Gogh, whose paintings were exhibited in Copenhagen in 1893.

In 1896, he moved to Stockholm, but visited Öland in the summers, where he painted cows and horses. After 1900, his palette lightened and he began adding dots to his work. He also did illustrations, designed furniture and produced some humorous paintings called the historiska baksidor ('historic backs'), showing famous rulers from behind. Between 1904 and 1905, he executed some large wall paintings at the Engelbrektsskolan. In his final years, he had problems with his eyesight, but was able to continue painting.

His works may be seen in the Nationalmuseum, Prins Eugens Waldemarsudde, the Thiel Gallery, and the Gothenburg Museum of Art.

Industrialist Ivar Kreuger was his cousin.

== Selected paintings ==
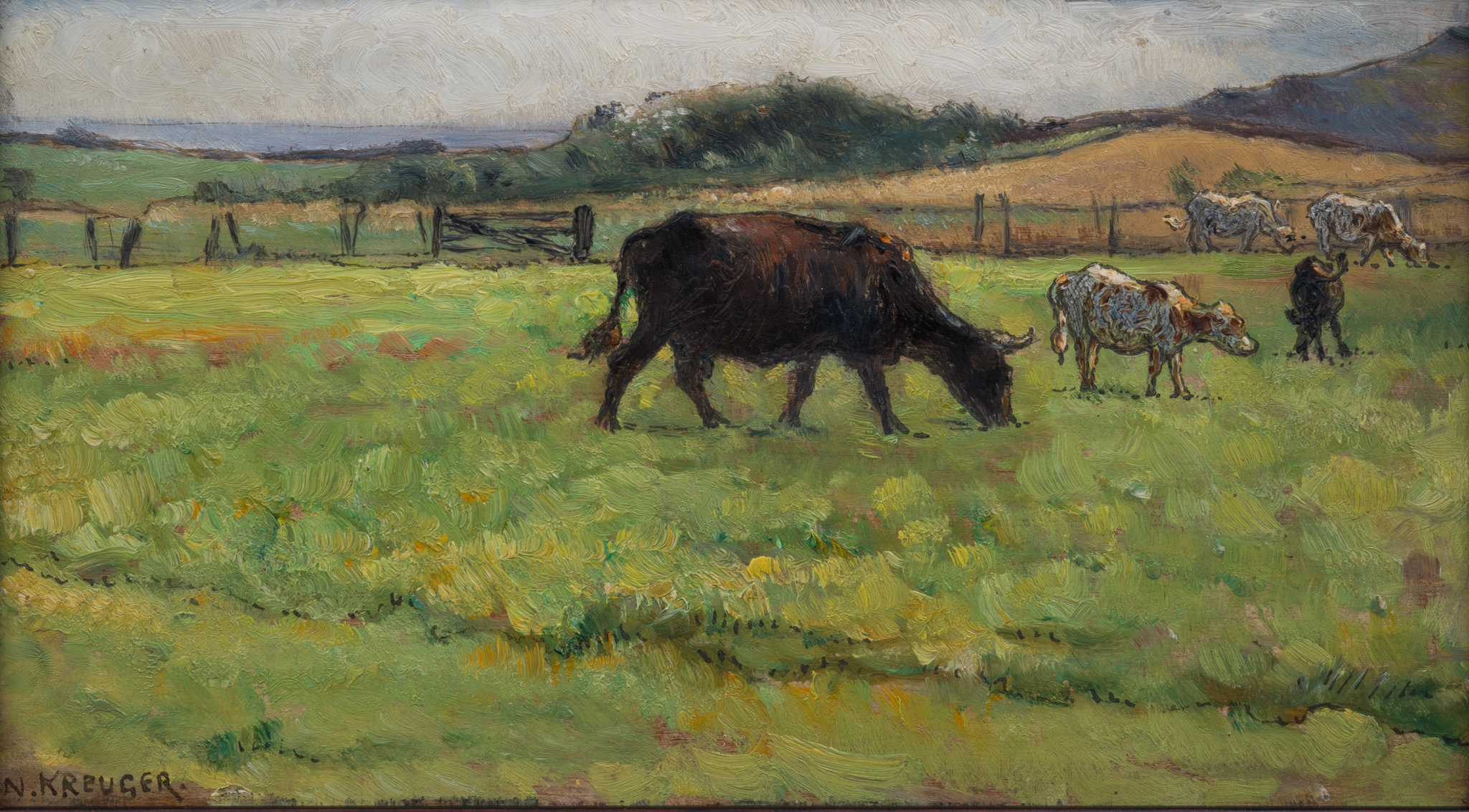
Cattle on the Meadow

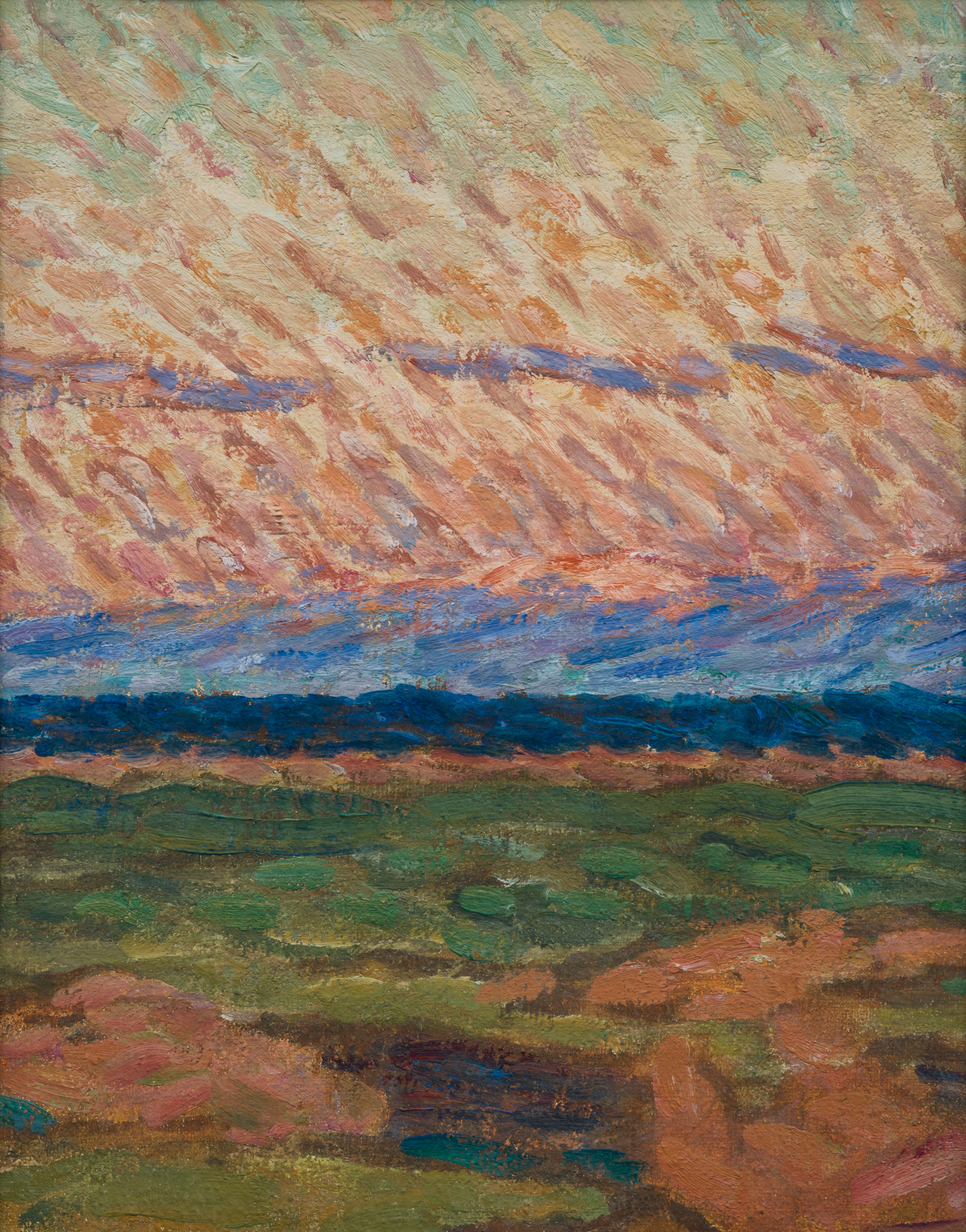
Landscape View from Öland, Sweden, C. 1905

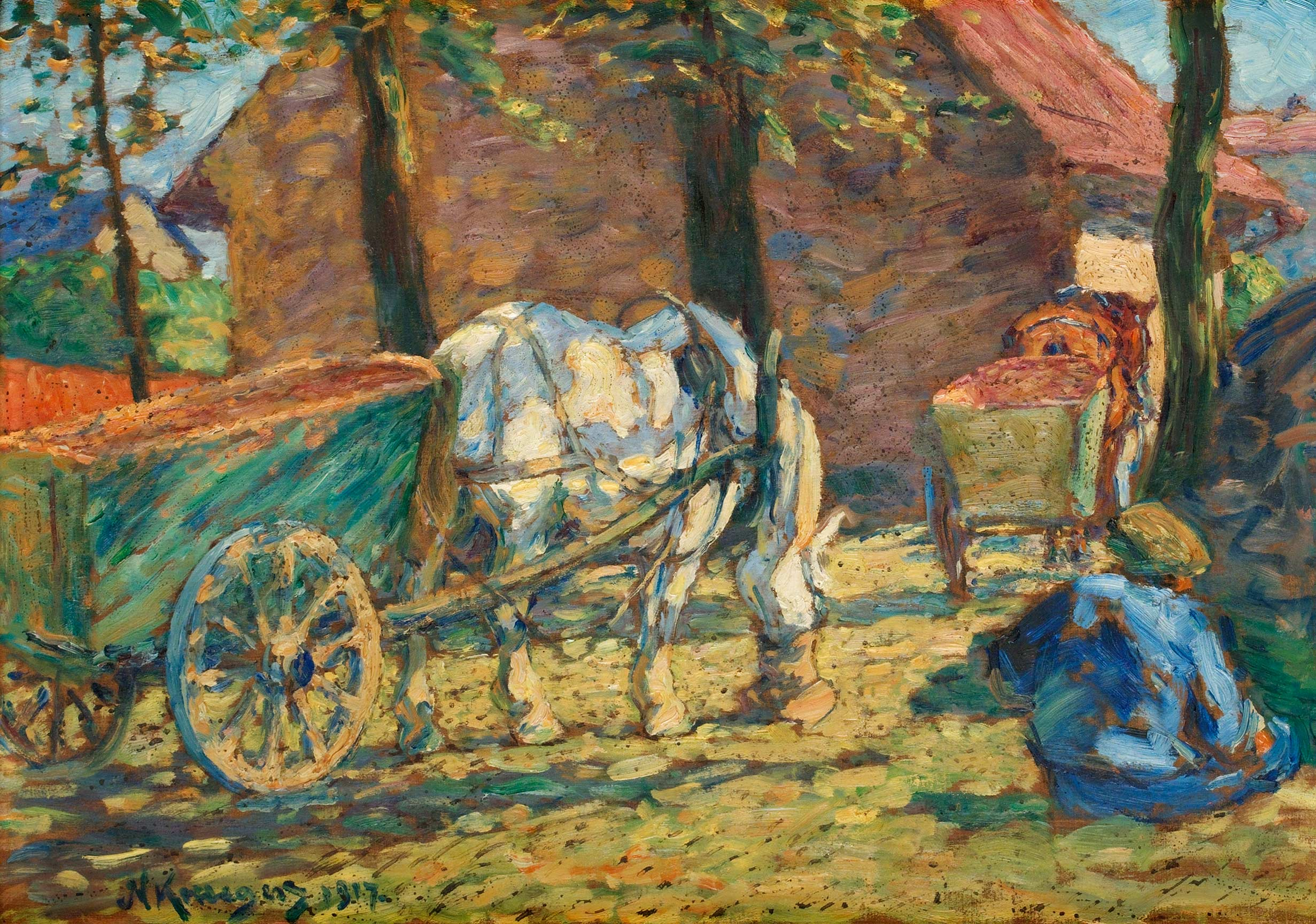
Mid Day Rest

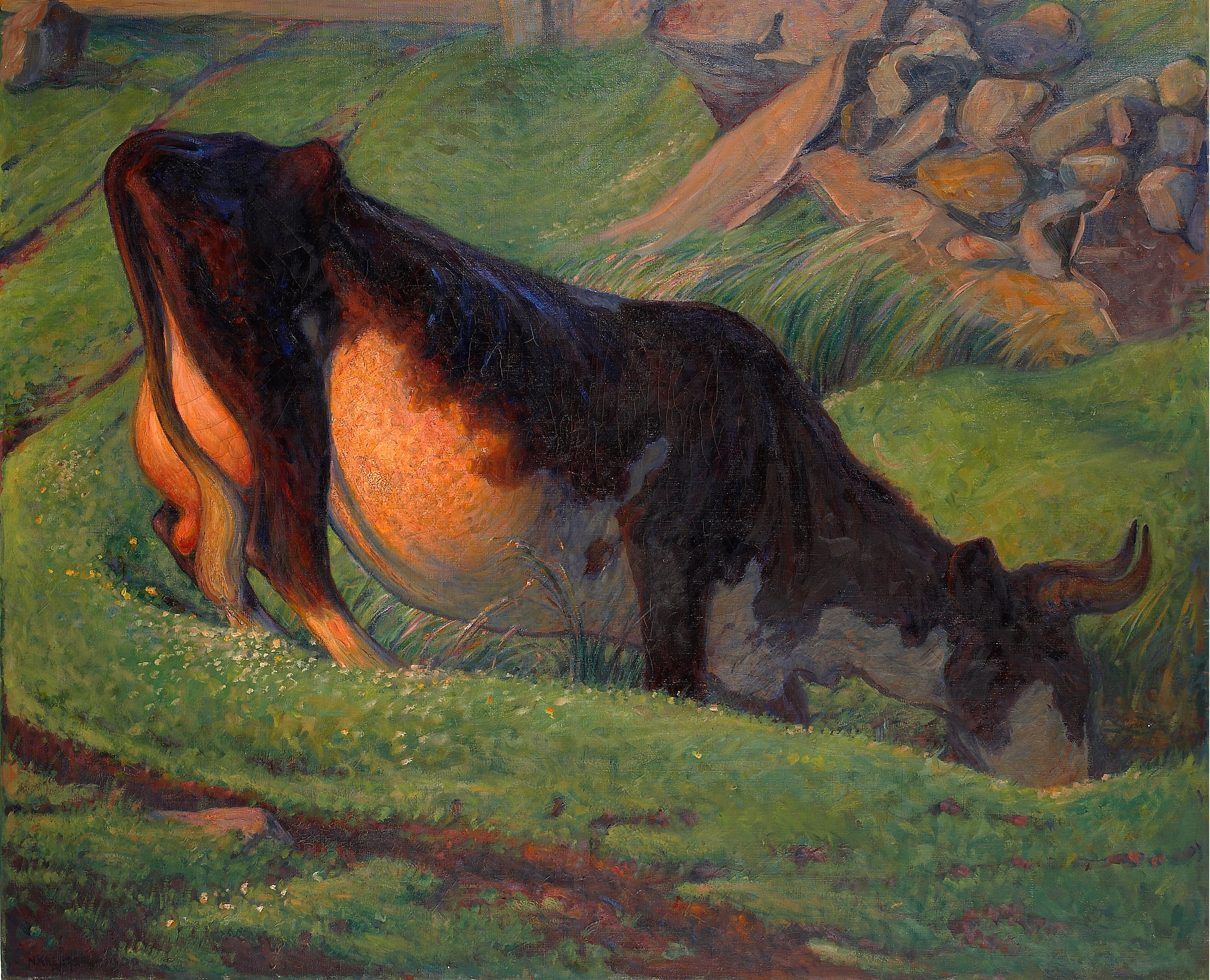
Grazing Cow

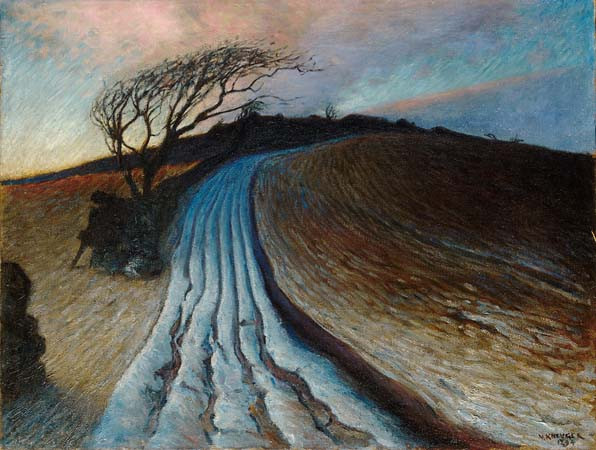
October Evening at Apelviken (Varberg)

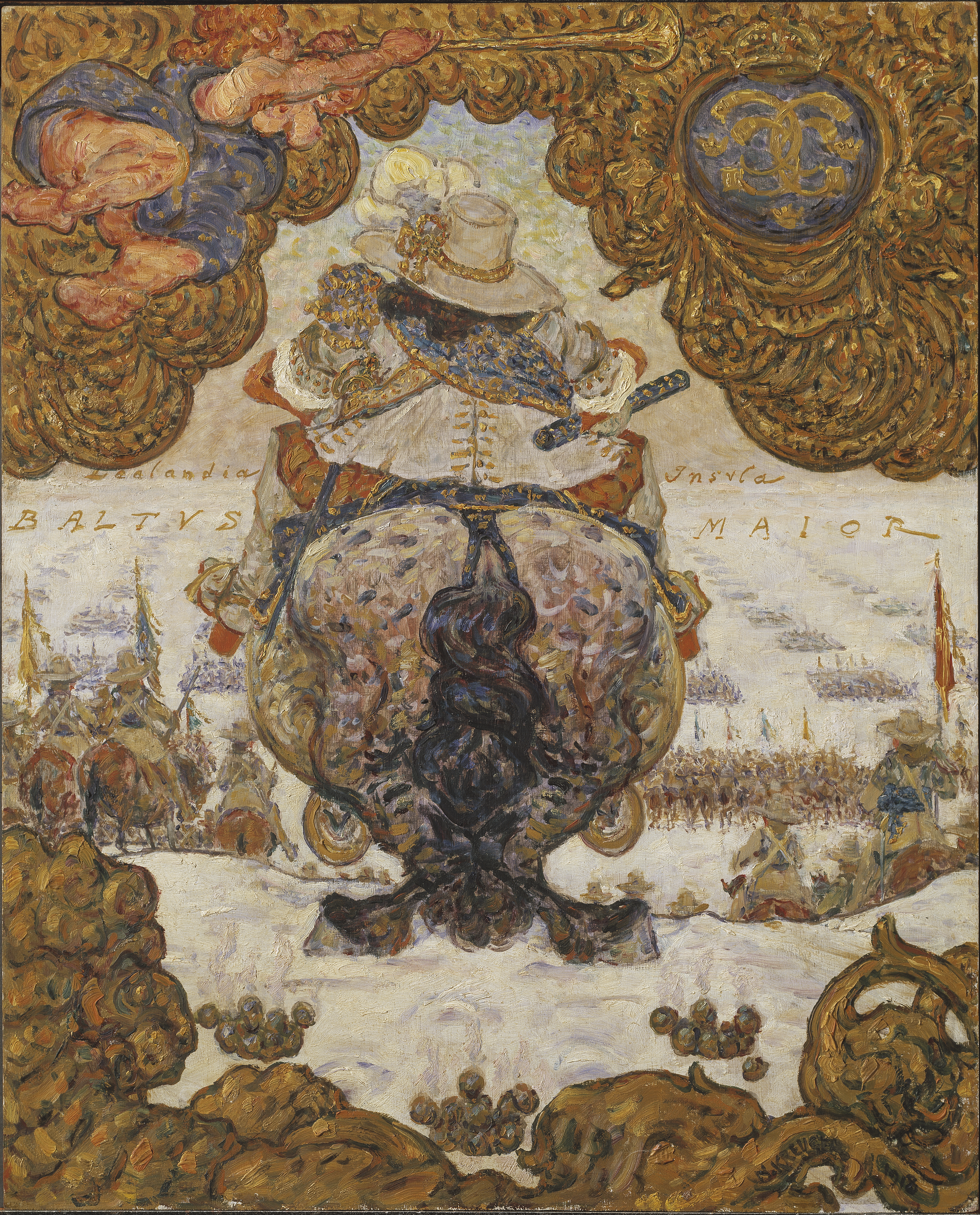
King Karl X, from "Historic Backs"

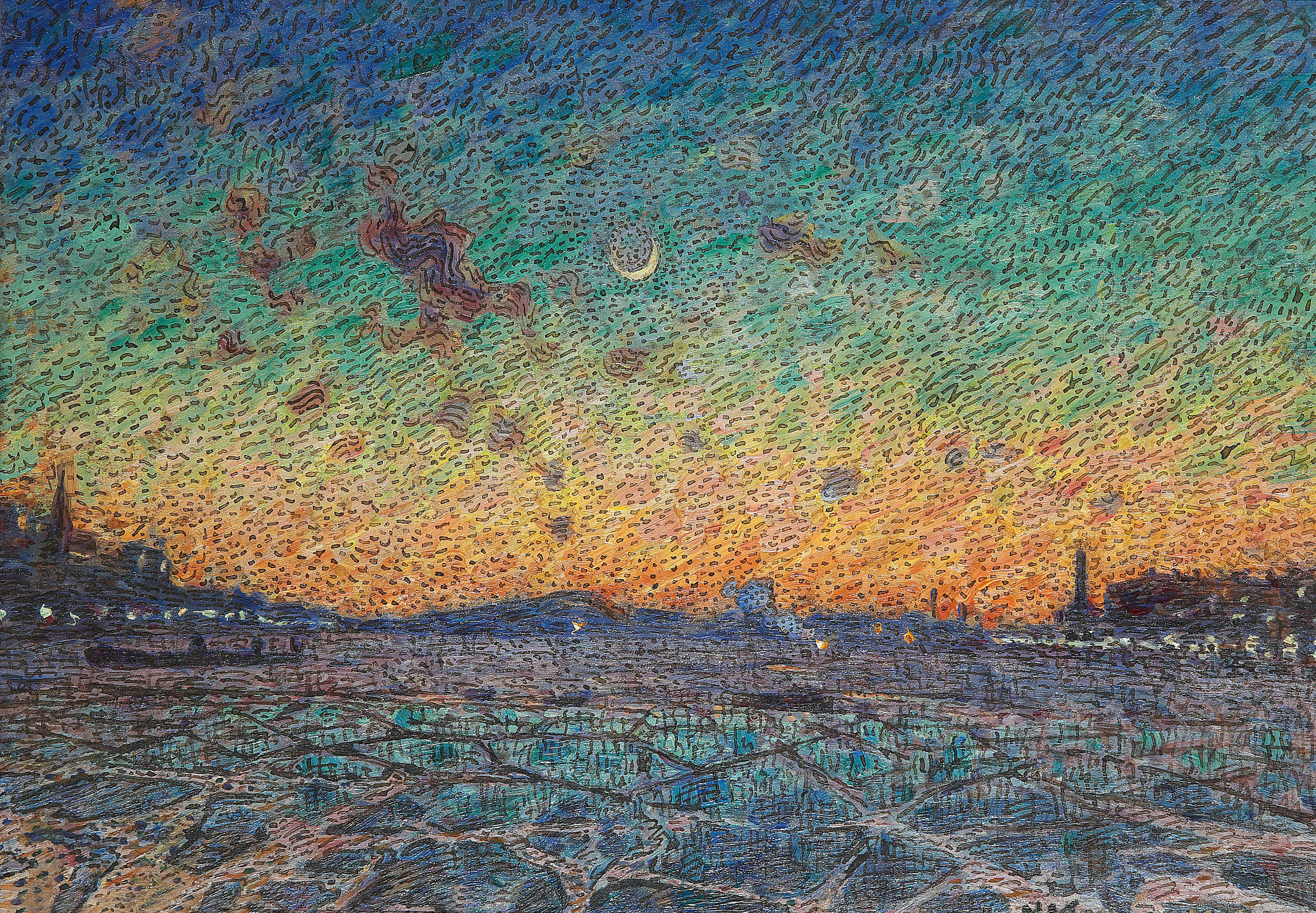
Evening in March

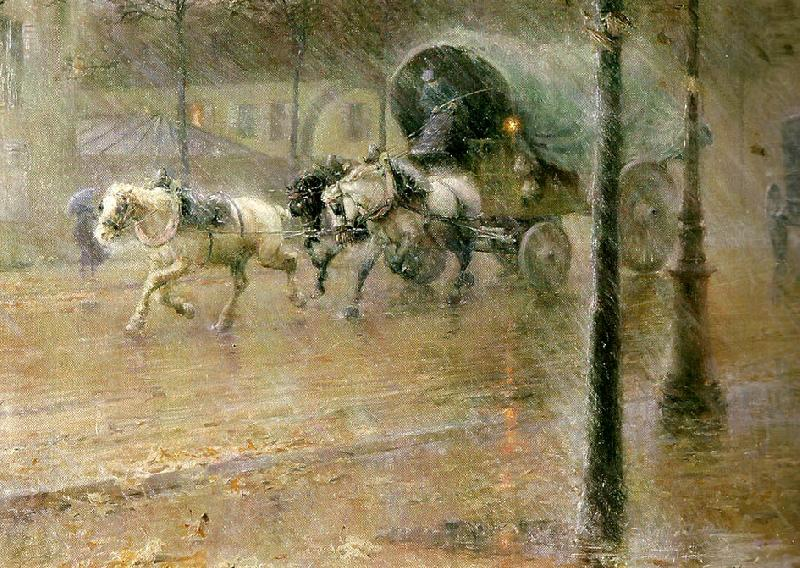
In the Rain (Paris)
