= Fritz Lindström =

Swedish landscape and portrait painter (1874–1962)

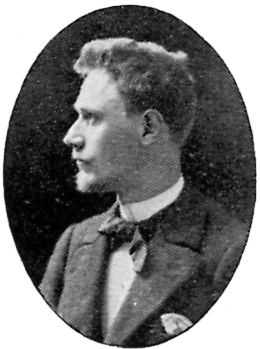
Lindström, c. 1901

August Fredrik (Fritz) Lindström (5 July 1874 – 4 January 1962) was a Swedish landscape and portrait painter.

== Biography ==
Lindström was born in Stockholm, Sweden. He first studied with the decorative painter Carl Grabow (1847–1922) at Karlavägen in Stockholm and then attended the Konstnärsförbundet school where he trained with Richard Bergh in 1892–1894 and 1895–1896. He studied with Carl Larsson at Valand Academy 1894–1895. He conducted study trips to Copenhagen and Paris in 1897–1899.

In 1903, he moved to Arvika in Värmland with his wife Anna Lindström (1875–1909) and two children. He was attracted to Arvika by artist Björn Ahlgrensson (1872–1918) who was married to his sister, Elsa. Here he was part of the artist community which is referred to as the Racken colony (Rackstadkolonin) and which included artists including Christian Eriksson (1858–1935), Gustaf Fjæstad (1868–1948) and his wife Maja Fjæstad (1873–1961). He died in 1962 at Arvika.
