= Gösta von Hennigs =

Swedish painter

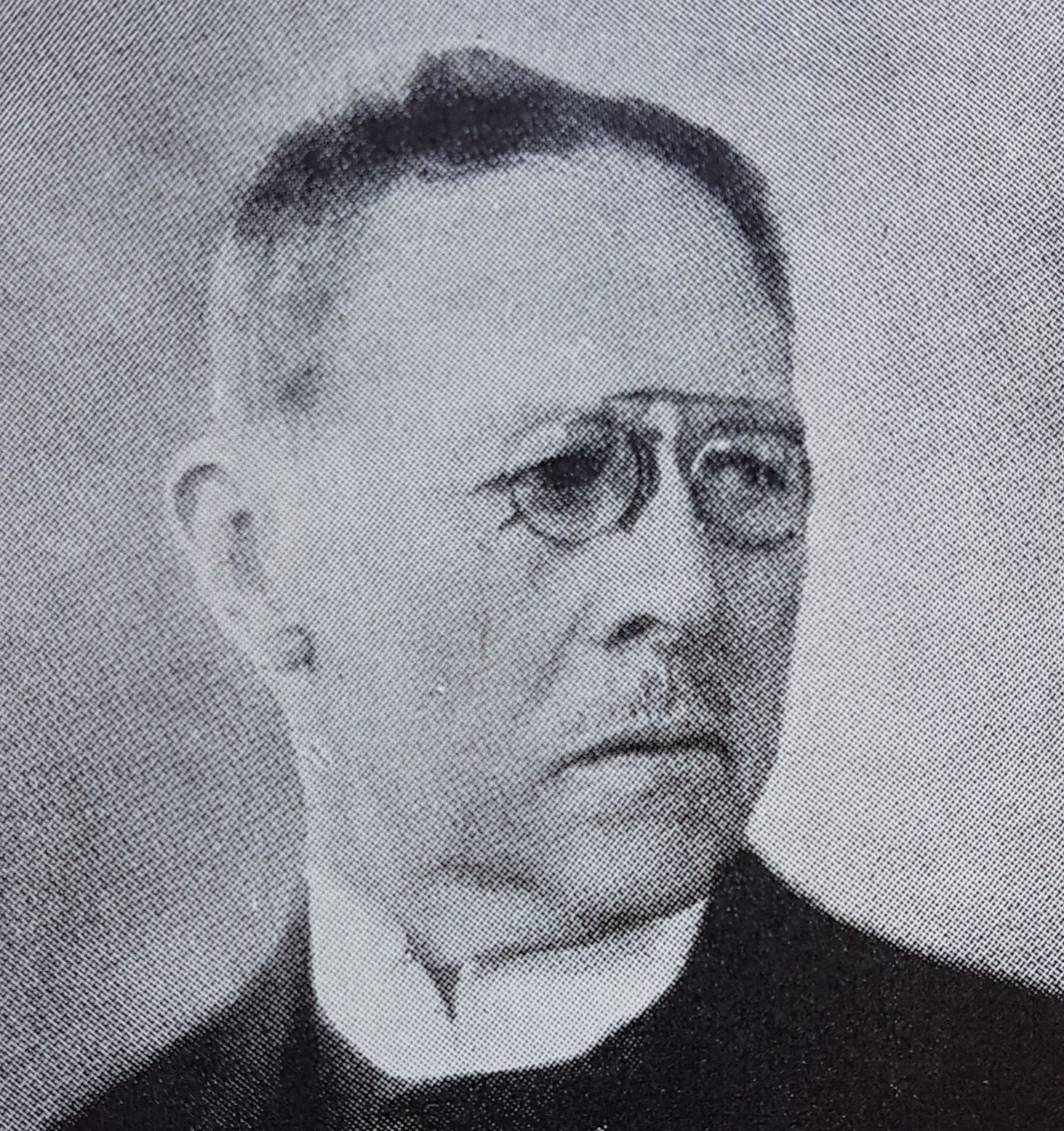
- Born: 15 April 1866; Vadstena, Sweden
- Died: 26 December 1941 (aged 75); Stockholm, Sweden
- Occupation: Painter

Gösta von Hennigs (15 April 1866 – 26 December 1941) was a Swedish painter. His work was part of the painting event in the art competition at the 1932 Summer Olympics.

== Works ==
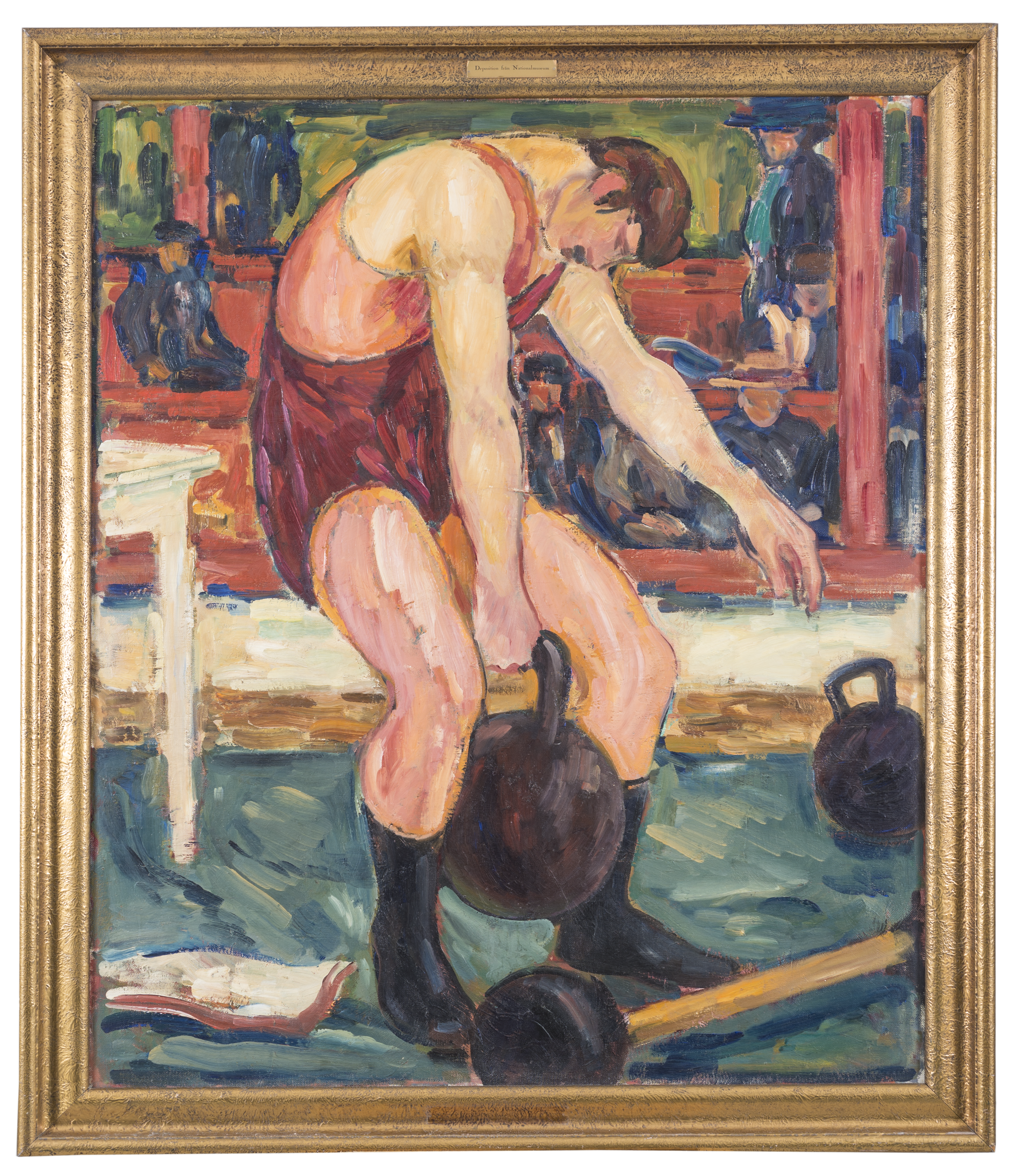
Athletes

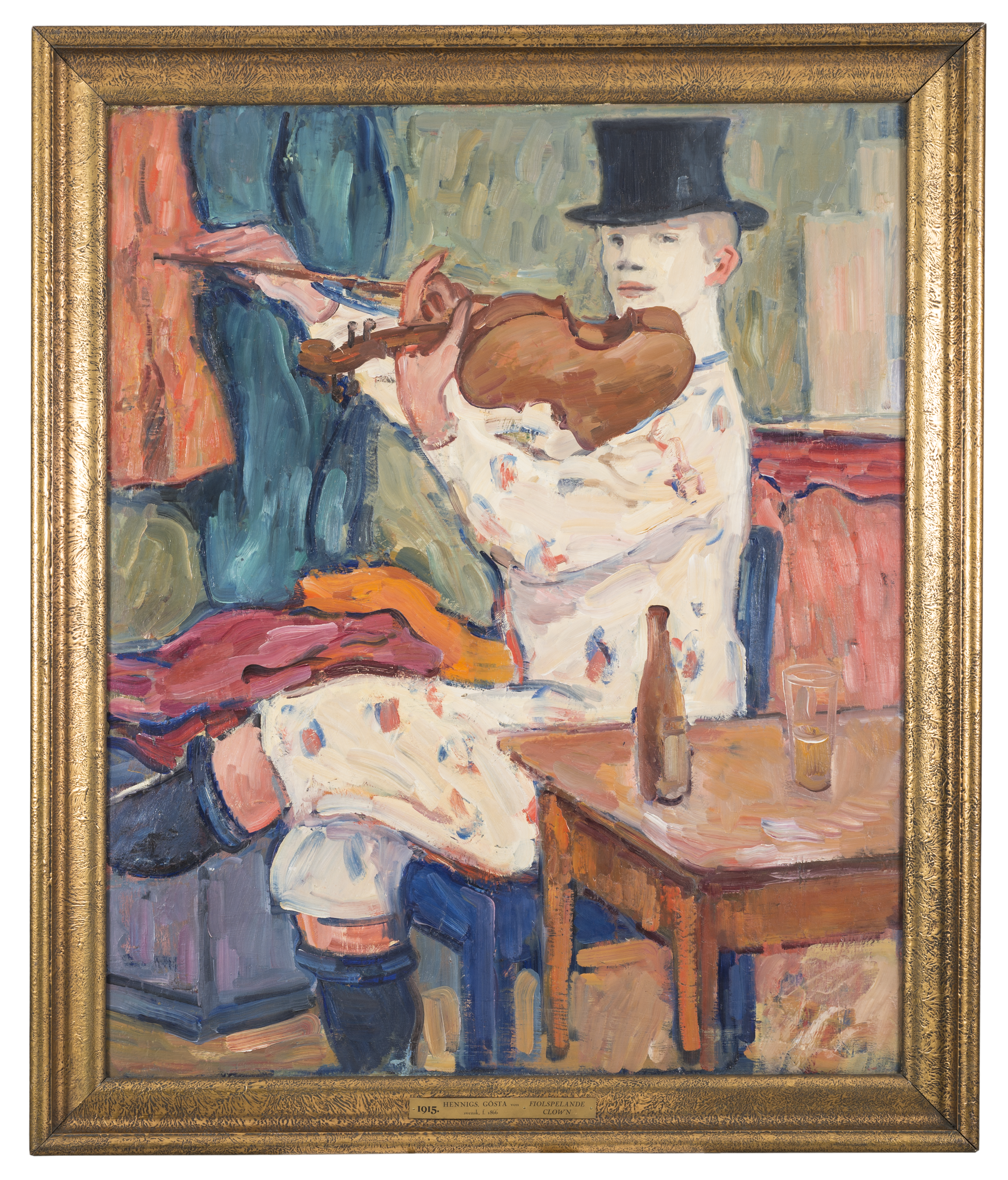
A Clown Playing the Violin

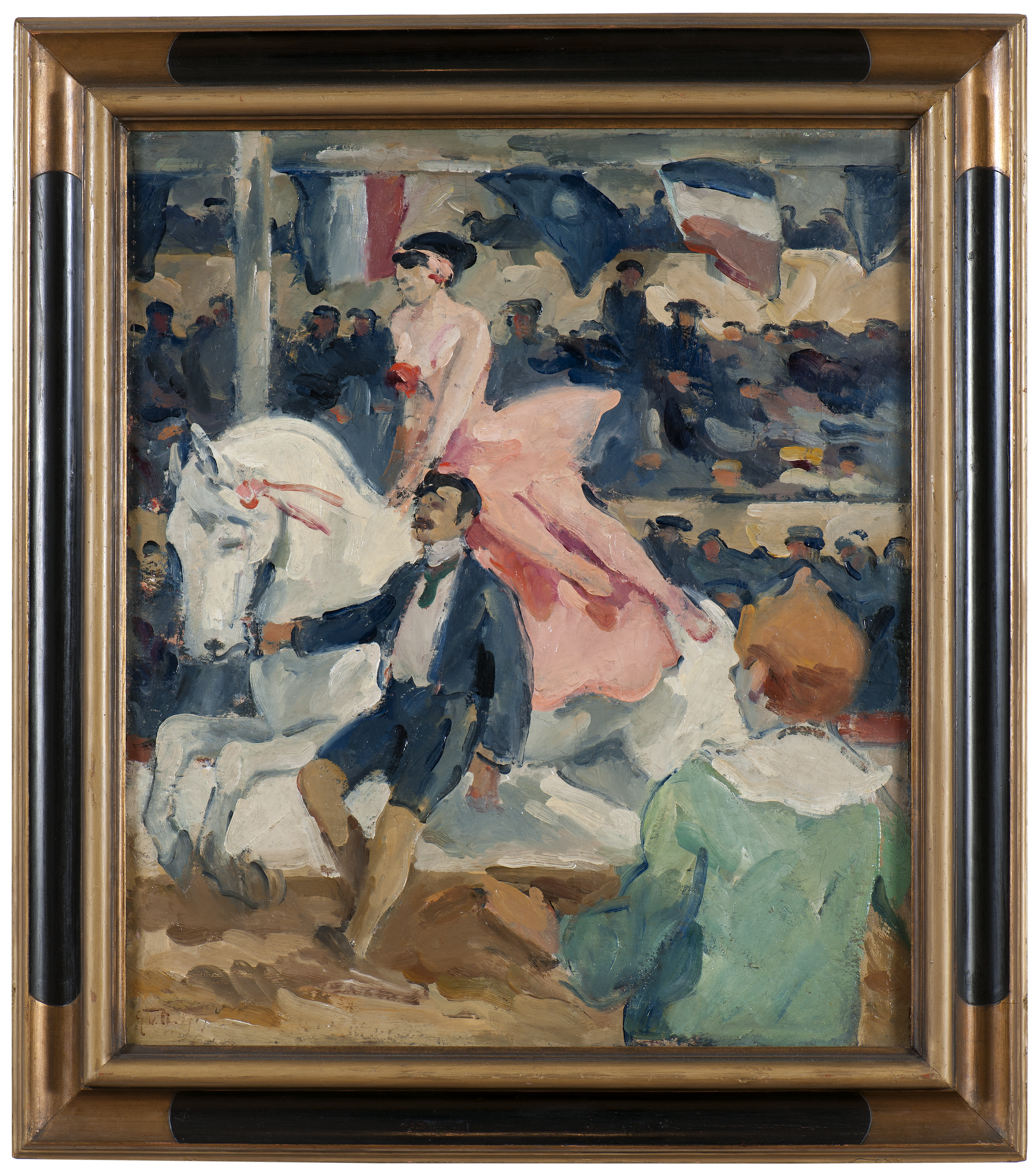
Horsewoman

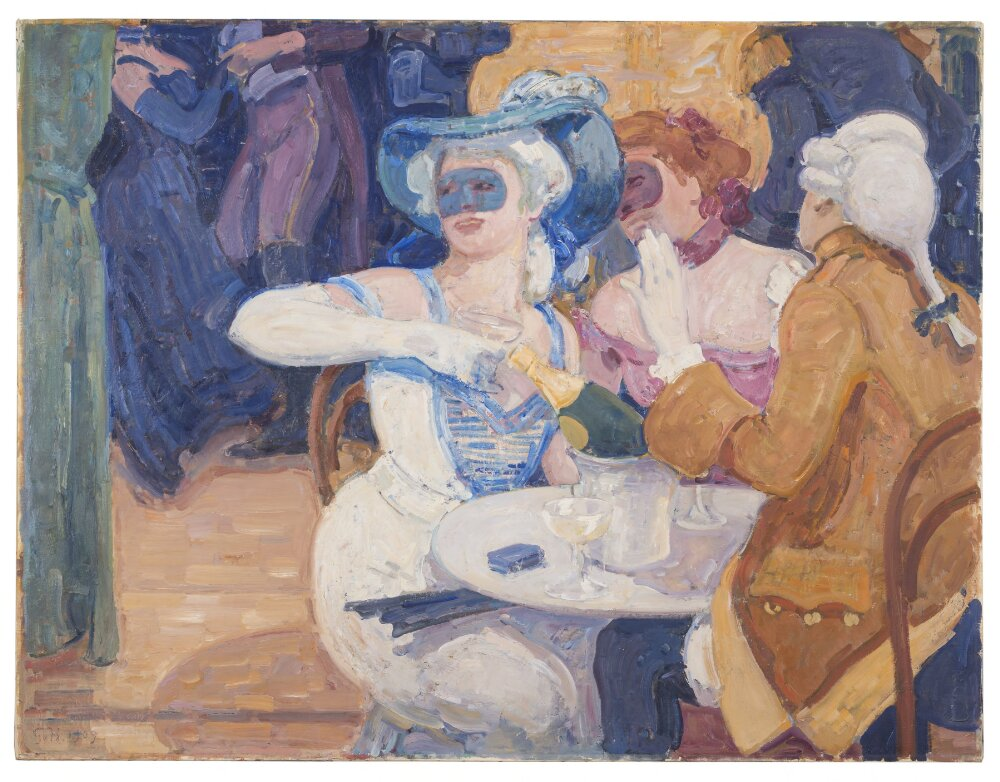
Carnival

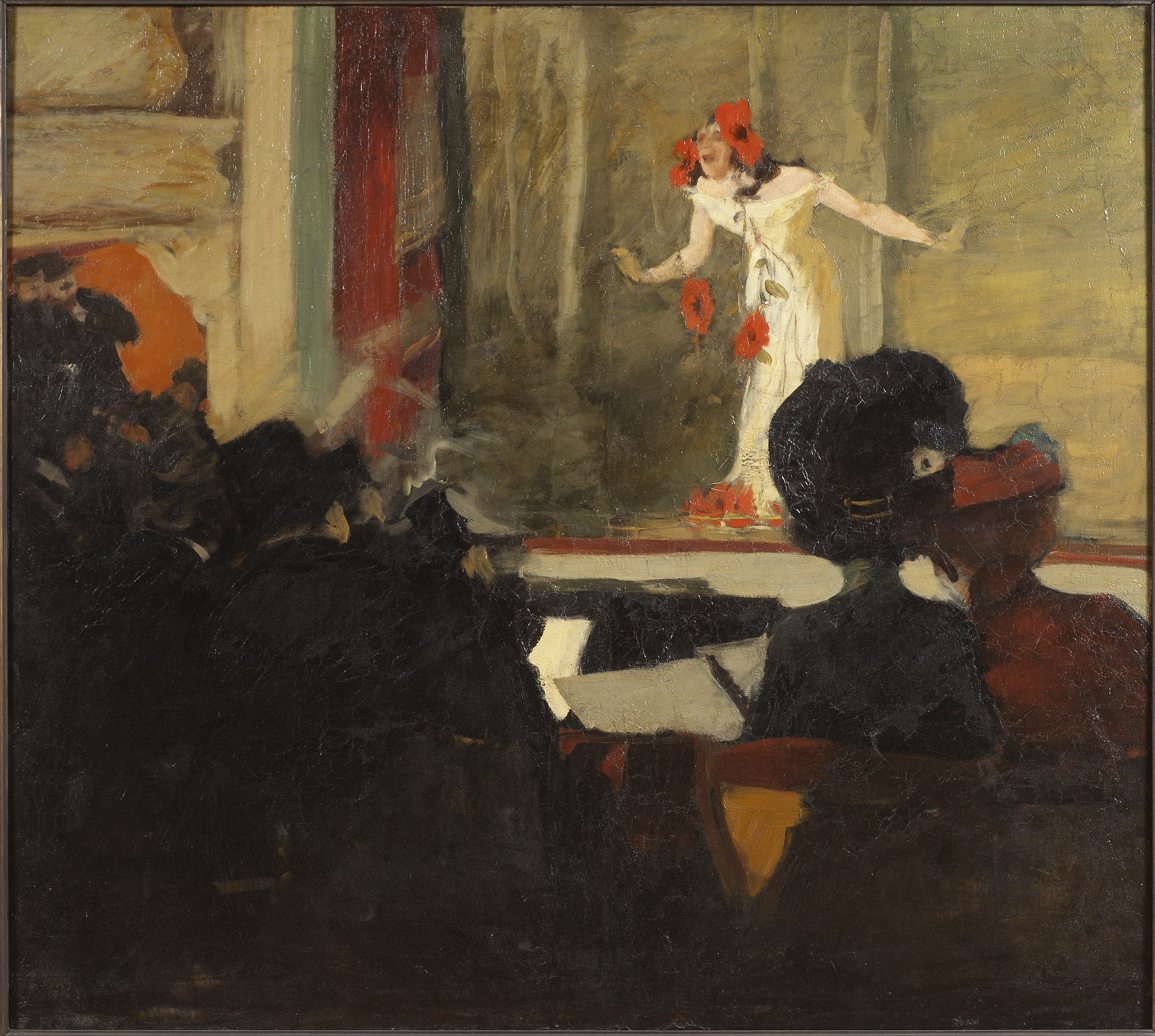
Music-Hall Scene

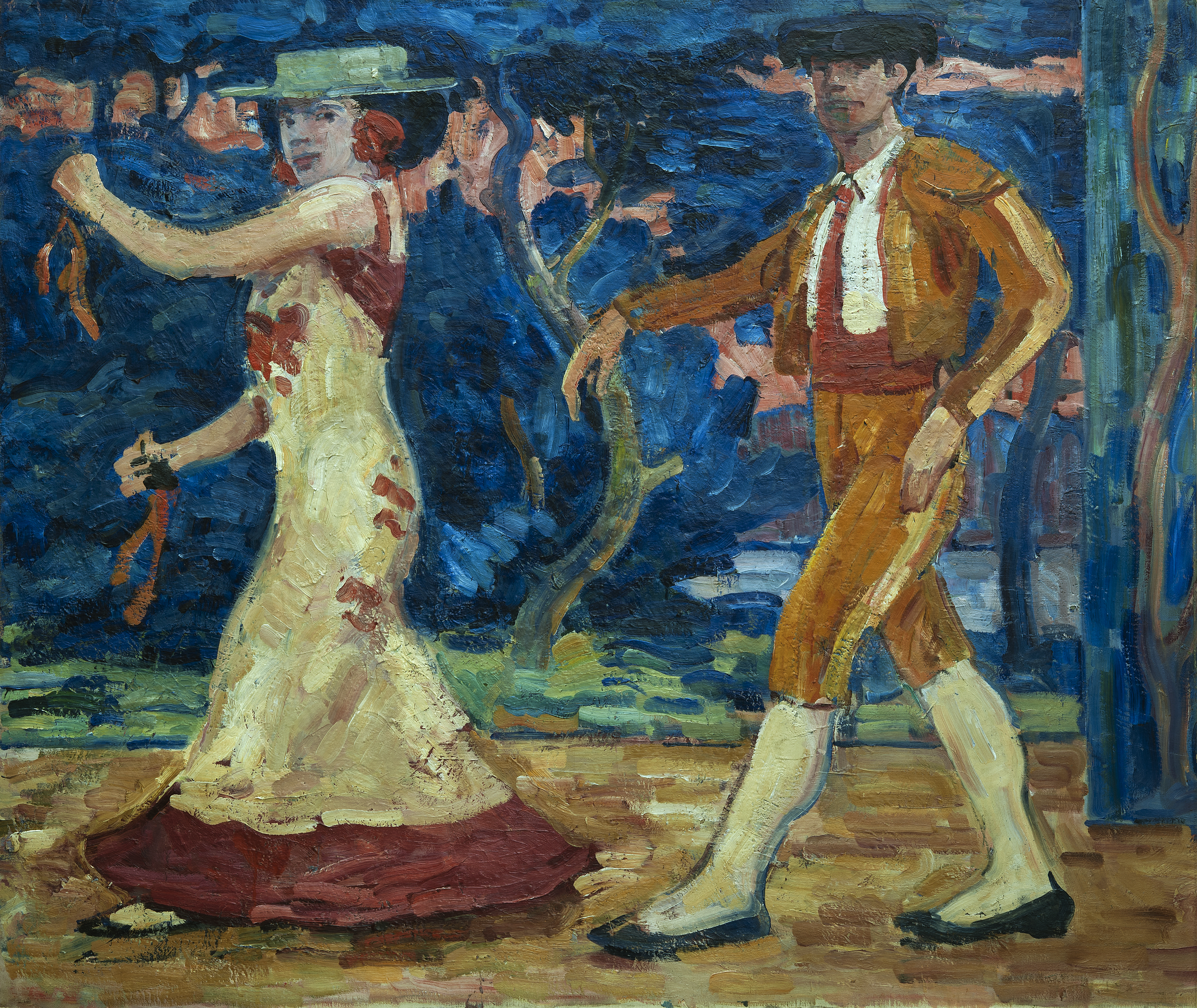
Spanish Dance

Horse Racing

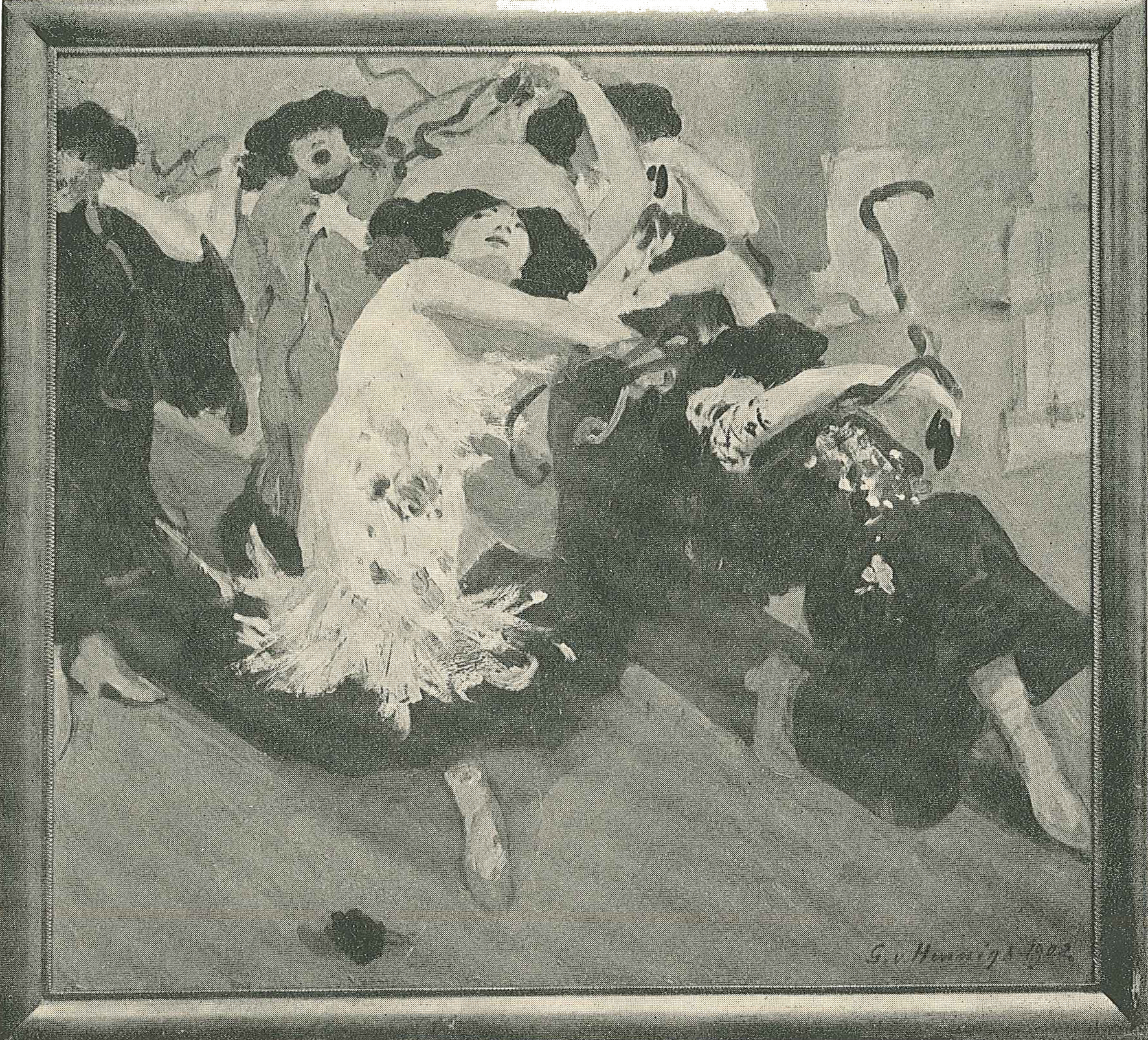

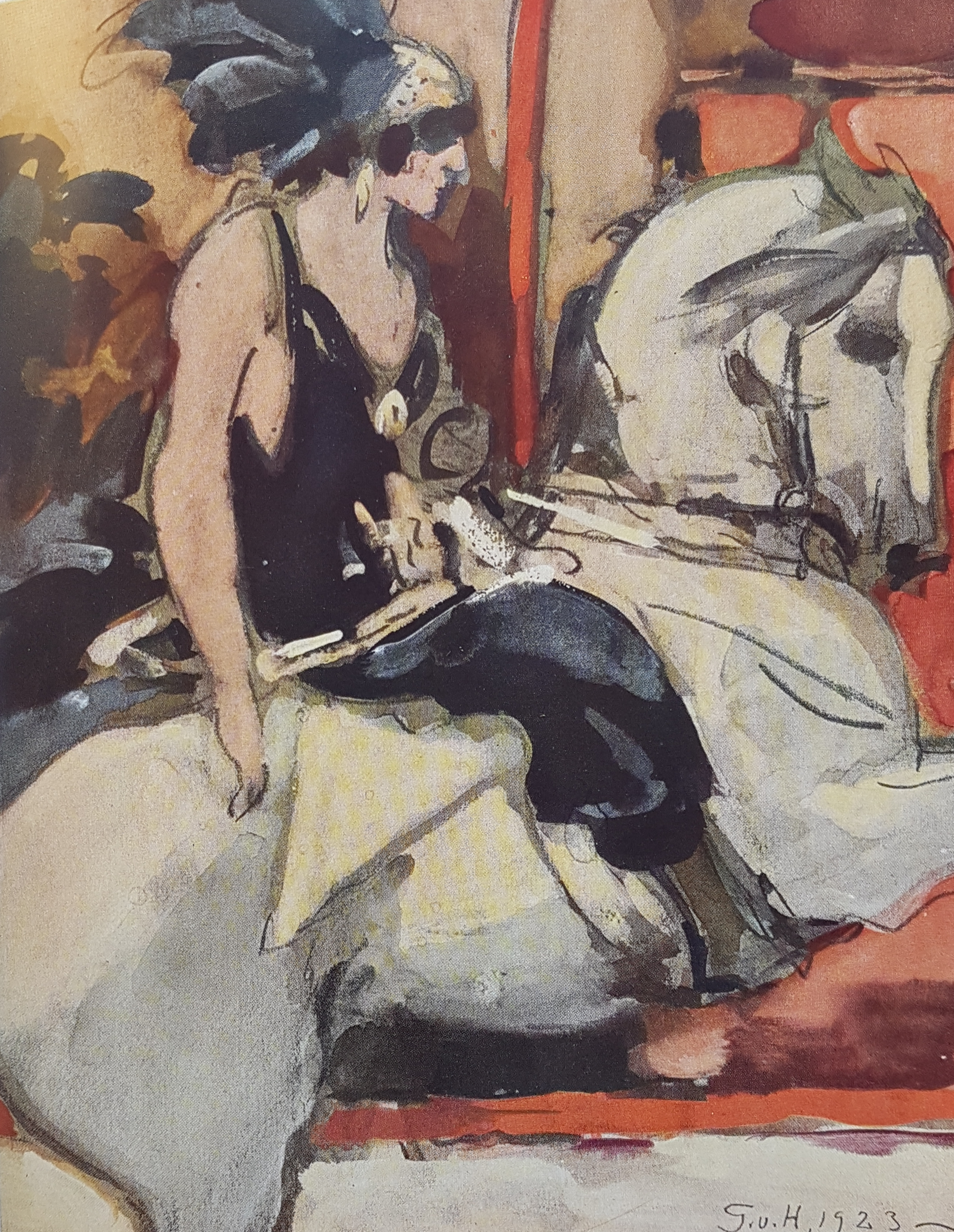
