= Arvika =

Locality in Värmland, Sweden

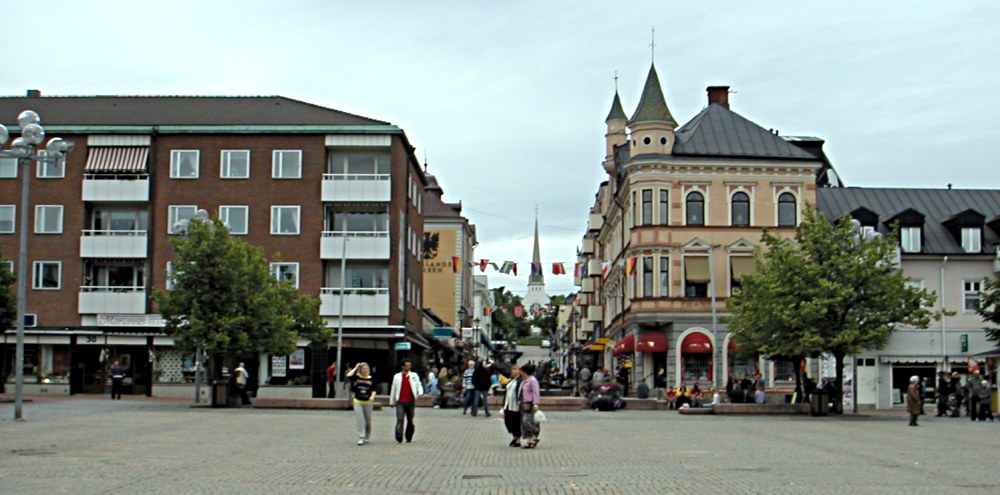
- Central Arvika in June 2004

- Location within Sweden
- Coordinates: 59°39′15″N 12°35′29″E
- Country: Sweden
- Province: Värmland
- County: Värmland County
- Municipality: Arvika Municipality
- Established: 1911

Area
  - Total: 10.62 km^{2} (4.10 sq mi)
- Elevation: 58 m (190 ft)

Population (31 December 2010)
  - Total: 14,244
  - Density: 1,341/km^{2} (3,470/sq mi)
- Time zone: UTC+1 (CET)
  - Summer (DST): UTC+2 (CEST)
- Postal code: 671 xx
- Area code: (+46) 570
- Website: Official website

Arvika is a locality and the seat of Arvika Municipality, Värmland County, Sweden with 27,032 inhabitants in 2026.

== Geography ==
The town of Arvika is situated at Kyrkviken, a bay of Glafsfjorden, Sweden's only inland fjord, a remnant of the time following the last ice age (once a fjord of the Ancylus Lake). The town is located approximately 380 km west of Stockholm, 250 km north of Gothenburg, 150 km east of Oslo, and 50 km from the Norwegian border.

The area is hilly with the tallest hill Storkasberget close to the town centre.

Arvika and its surroundings have excellent water infrastructure. In fact, Arvika has the innermost harbour in the whole of Sweden. Through a system of canals, lake Vänern can be reached, and from there the Göta Canal allows further passage to Gothenburg and Sweden's west coast.

== History ==
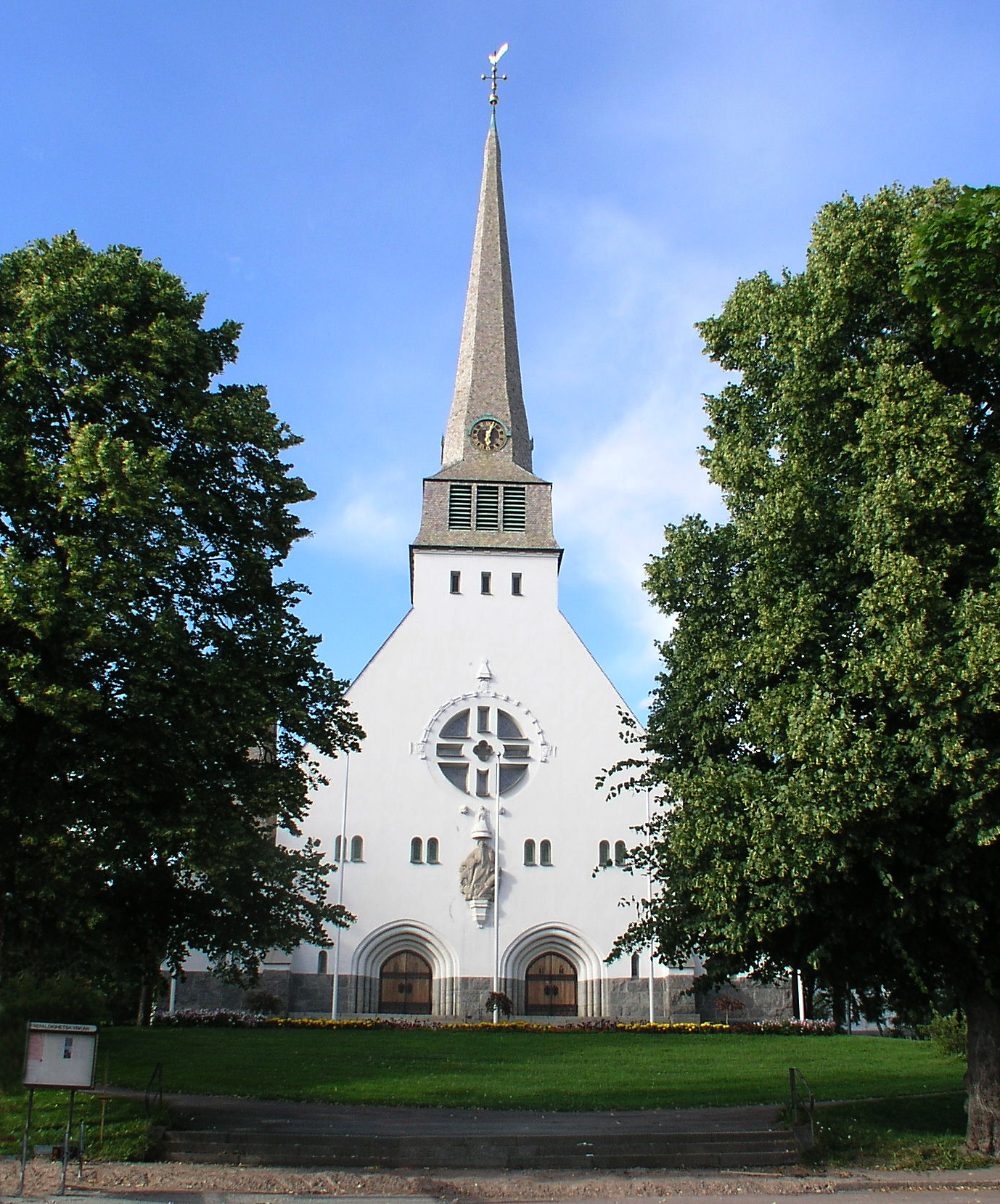

Ten kilometers west of the city, in Bergs Klätt, there are remnants of a younger Stone Age and Nordic Bronze Age settlements in the form of graves.

The town was a village until 1811 when it was given town privileges by royal charter under the name Oscarsstad in order to improve the economy of the area. This attempt was unsuccessful, and the town privileges were repealed in 1821 and the town was instead given the status of köping (township) and renamed Arvika. The town privileges were reinstated at the founding centennial in 1911, and the name Arvika remained. The city status is now obsolete, but Arvika is since 1971 the seat of the larger Arvika municipality.

The church Mikaelikyrkan is from 1647, and the church in the centre, Trefaldighetskyrkan, is from the same year as the town, 1911.

== Industry ==
Arvika has several heavy industrial production facilities which employ the majority of the population, among these Thermia, Volvo Construction Equipment (Wheel loaders), Arvika Gjuteri (nodular and grey iron foundry) and Coffee Queen, a coffee machine factory.

== Culture ==
Arvika is known for the turn of the century (around 1900) artist commune Rackstad just outside the city. Here, several famous Swedish artists lived and worked, the most well-known probably being Christian Eriksson and Gustaf Fjæstad and his wife Maja Fjæstad. Other talents that lived in Rackstad include Björn Ahlgrensson and Fritz Lindström. Arvika is also home of NHL player Jacob De La Rose, drafted by the Montreal Canadiens in 2012.

The Arvika Festival (since 1992) was the biggest annual event in the area, with several international bands visiting the town during three days in July every summer. In recent years such bands as Einstürzende Neubauten, Hot Chip, Robyn, The Knife, Ministry, New Order, Kraftwerk and Franz Ferdinand have performed here. The 2009 festival was headlined by Depeche Mode, Nine Inch Nails, Röyksopp and Korn and was the biggest edition of the festival ever.

One of the six university colleges of music in Sweden, Ingesund College of Music, a department of Karlstad University, is situated in Arvika.

== International relations ==
=== Twin towns — Sister cities ===
Arvika has four twin cities:

(Norway)	Kongsvinger, Norway
(Denmark)	Skive Municipality, Denmark
(Finland)	Ylöjärvi, Finland
(Hungary)	Szigetszentmiklós, Hungary

== Climate ==
Arvika has a humid continental climate (Köppen Dfb) that borders being subarctic (Dfc) using the official reference period 1961-1990. It has partial maritime influence, but retains its classification due to cool nights throughout the year courtesy of its inland position with less maritime influence than the Värmland capital of Karlstad on Lake Vänern. The highest recorded temperature since the weather station's inception in 1945 is 33.9 °C (93.0 °F) on August 7, 1975, and the lowest is −38.0 °C (−36.4 °F) from February 9, 1966.

Climate data for Arvika (temperature & precipitation 2002–2018 — extremes 1945–present)
Month	Jan	Feb	Mar	Apr	May	Jun	Jul	Aug	Sep	Oct	Nov	Dec	Year
Record high °C (°F)	10.2 (50.4)	14.0 (57.2)	20.4 (68.7)	25.5 (77.9)	30.2 (86.4)	33.8 (92.8)	33.7 (92.7)	33.9 (93.0)	28.0 (82.4)	20.4 (68.7)	16.1 (61.0)	13.0 (55.4)	33.9 (93.0)
Mean maximum °C (°F)	6.6 (43.9)	6.8 (44.2)	13.5 (56.3)	18.8 (65.8)	25.0 (77.0)	27.4 (81.3)	29.2 (84.6)	27.0 (80.6)	22.5 (72.5)	16.6 (61.9)	11.4 (52.5)	7.7 (45.9)	30.2 (86.4)
Mean daily maximum °C (°F)	−0.7 (30.7)	0.6 (33.1)	5.6 (42.1)	11.7 (53.1)	17.2 (63.0)	21.0 (69.8)	23.3 (73.9)	21.3 (70.3)	17.0 (62.6)	10.0 (50.0)	4.8 (40.6)	0.5 (32.9)	11.0 (51.8)
Daily mean °C (°F)	−4.5 (23.9)	−3.8 (25.2)	−0.1 (31.8)	5.3 (41.5)	10.6 (51.1)	14.5 (58.1)	17.0 (62.6)	15.4 (59.7)	11.3 (52.3)	5.4 (41.7)	1.5 (34.7)	−3.2 (26.2)	5.8 (42.4)
Mean daily minimum °C (°F)	−8.3 (17.1)	−8.2 (17.2)	−5.8 (21.6)	−1.1 (30.0)	4.0 (39.2)	7.9 (46.2)	10.7 (51.3)	9.5 (49.1)	5.6 (42.1)	0.7 (33.3)	−1.9 (28.6)	−6.9 (19.6)	0.5 (32.9)
Mean minimum °C (°F)	−21.7 (−7.1)	−20.4 (−4.7)	−15.3 (4.5)	−7.6 (18.3)	−3.7 (25.3)	1.6 (34.9)	4.7 (40.5)	2.3 (36.1)	−2.8 (27.0)	−7.2 (19.0)	−10.9 (12.4)	−18.7 (−1.7)	−25.4 (−13.7)
Record low °C (°F)	−35.5 (−31.9)	−38.0 (−36.4)	−30.0 (−22.0)	−16.0 (3.2)	−6.7 (19.9)	−3.4 (25.9)	1.2 (34.2)	−1.9 (28.6)	−7.0 (19.4)	−14.5 (5.9)	−24.0 (−11.2)	−31.9 (−25.4)	−38.0 (−36.4)
Average precipitation mm (inches)	46.6 (1.83)	31.5 (1.24)	26.6 (1.05)	32.8 (1.29)	57.5 (2.26)	60.8 (2.39)	82.7 (3.26)	85.7 (3.37)	53.7 (2.11)	59.3 (2.33)	55.2 (2.17)	42.4 (1.67)	634.8 (24.97)
Source 1:
Source 2:
