= Maja Fjæstad =

Swedish artist (1873–1961)

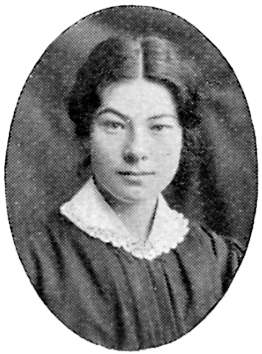
Maja Fjæstad (1901)

Kerstin Maria (Maja) Fjæstad née Hallén (1873–1961) was a Swedish artist who was successful as a portrait painter, as well as a textile artist and an engraver. Together with her husband Gustaf Fjæstad, at the turn of the century she became an active member of the Rackstad Artists Colony in Värmland. In nearby Arvika, in 1922 she was one of twelve artists who established the crafts association Arvika Konsthantverk which she chaired until 1948. She is remembered in particular for her many woodcuts from the 1910s, combining Nordic and Asian traditions with depictions of cherry branches or spring flowers. Some are to be found in the collections of the Victoria and Albert Museum and the British Museum.

== Early life ==
Born on 30 May 1873 in Hörby, Skåne, Kerstin Maria Hallén was the daughter of the cleric Lars Hallén and his wife Sofia Benedikta née Trädgårdh. After completing her school education in Landskrona, she continued her studies at the Technical College in Malmö, receiving private tuition in painting. With assignments from the Lund Cultural History Museum, she focused on textile art. After being refused admission to the Swedish Academy of Fine Arts, in the early 1890s she studied painting under Kerstin Cardon and from 1893 to 1895 attended the Artists' Association School studying under Richard Bergh, Carl Larsson and Anders Zorn.

== Career ==
In 1895, Maja Hallén became a member of the Artists' Association where she met the artist Gustaf Fjӕstad. After they married in 1898, they moved into a studio home in Arvika belonging to the sculptor Christian Eriksson. They later moved into their own spacious home, designed by Gustaf Fjӕstad where they encouraged cultural friends from Stockholm as well as local artists and craftsmen to visit them. This led to the artists' colony known as the Racken Group (Rackengruppen), consisting of a number of players with varying cultural interests. Prominent members included the artists Fritz Lindstrom (1874–1962) and Björn Ahlgrensson (1872–1918).

In addition to her creations with textiles, Maja Fjæstad was also involved in carpentry designs and continued to paint. In 1901, she established her own weaving workshop. Her designs were based on local vegetation, often in geometrical arrangements. Her earlier work is considered to be more imaginative than her later creations. Around 1915, she began to work with woodcuts depicting plants and flowers, creating a total of some 170 subjects. Generally printed on Japanese paper, they were widely exhibited in the 1920s and 1930s, not only in Sweden but in England and the United States. Examples are to be found in London's Victoria and Albert Museum and at the British Museum.

In 1922, together with twelve local artists, she founded Arvika Crafts (Arvika Konsthandverk) which she chaired until 1948.

Maja Fjæstad died on 15 November 1961 and is buried in Arvika.
