= Engelbrektsskolan =

Coordinates: 59°20′43″N 18°04′14″E

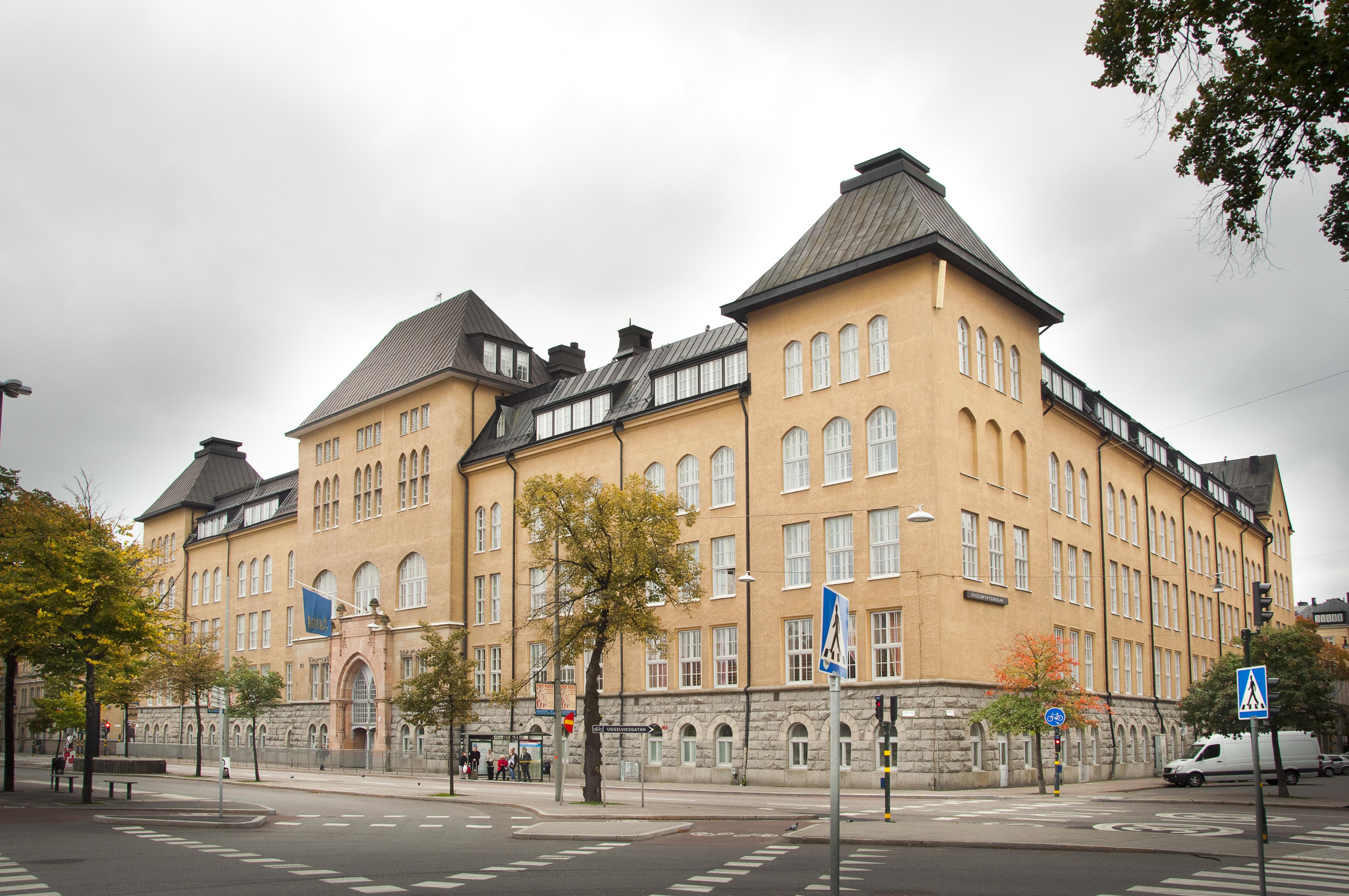
Engelbrektsskolan in 2010

Engelbrektsskolan is a school with grades F - 9 (see the Swedish school system) in the central parts of Stockholm, the capital of Sweden (located on Valhallavägen 76). It has about 1,000 students and offers programs for talented individuals in both mathematics and football.

== History ==
Engelbrektskolan was founded in 1902 and was inaugurated by King Oscar II. The cost to purchase the land was 480,000 SEK (in 1899 value), and the construction of the building amounted to 895,000 SEK. Initially, the school was planned to accommodate 2,400 pupils, but after a few years, the actual attendance was only 1,200 children.

== Education for talented individuals in mathematics ==
The classes for talented students in mathematics consist of about 30 students, who are permitted to enter the class after a test that takes place during the spring of sixth grade (when they are about 12 – 13 years old). Students must have at least a B in mathematics to participate. In addition to the compulsory mathematics education in high school, the students will also complete the mathematics curriculum for the next three grades.

== Education for talented individuals in football ==
In collaboration with "Djurgårdens ungdomsförening," Engelbrektsskolan has a program for students with a special interest in soccer. They will have two extra lessons per week that include practical and theoretical education in soccer.
