= Elsa Giöbel-Oyler =

Swedish painter (1882–1979)

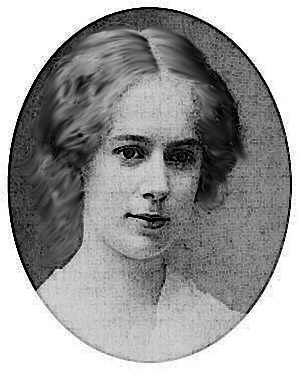
- Elsa Maria Giöbel-Oyler
- Born: 16 October 1882; Hällefors, Sweden
- Died: 11 February 1979 (aged 96); Nora, Sweden
- Known for: Oil painting
- Style: Figurative, landscape, still life
- Spouse: Philip Oyler

Elsa Maria Giöbel-Oyler (1882–1979) was a Swedish painter.

== Biography ==
Giöbel-Oyler was born in the small hamlet of Hällefors, Sweden to father, Adrian Giöbel and mother, Maria Matilda Carolina Giöbel. She had three sisters, Anna Maria Björk, Louise Maria Hayward and Gerda Maria Lummis; and two brothers, Karl Fredrik Giöbel and Christian Gunnar Giöbel. Her aunt, Selma Giöbel, was a well-known textile artist. In 1911, she married the writer Philip Oyler and in 1913 they had a daughter, Soldanella Oyler, who became an illustrator.

== Work ==
She is known for her still life, figurative and landscape paintings. In 1928 and 1929, her work was shown at the Southampton Art Society, England. Also in 1929 she had an exhibition at the Royal Academy in London. In 1937 her work was exhibited at the Renaissance Art Galleries, London. In 1952 she was given a retrospective exhibition at the Örebro Museum.

== Collections ==
Giöbel-Oyler is represented in the permanent collection of Nationalmuseum in Stockholm.

== Death ==
Giöbel-Oyler died in 1979 in the small town of Nora in the county of Örebro, in Sweden.
