= Eva Jancke-Björk =

Swedish ceramist, painter and textile artist

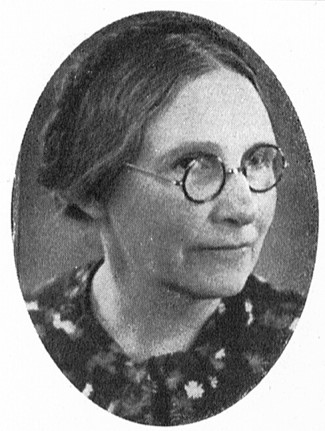
Eva Janke-Björk

Eva Henriette Jancke-Björk (1882–1981) was a Swedish ceramist, painter and textile artist. She became a prominent porcelain designer, working for Rörstrand, S:t Eriks Lervarufabriker and Bo fajans before establishing her own business in Mölndal near Gothenburg. She produced simply designed bowls, flower pots and tableware, both decorated and monochrome. Jancke-Björk also painted watercolours, created textile patterns and worked with glassware. Her works are in the collections of the Swedish National Museum of Fine Arts and the Röhsska Museum.

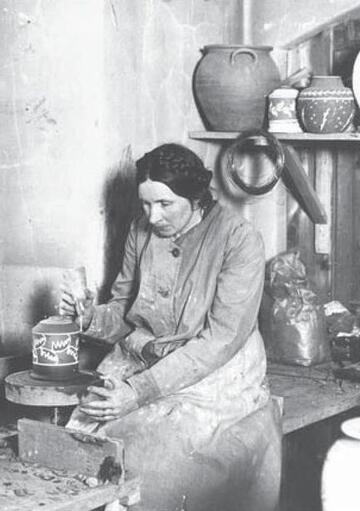
Jancke-Björk at work

== Biography ==
Born on 25 December 1882 in Kungsängen, Upplands-Bro Municipality, Eva Henriette Jancke was the daughter of the district judge Per Gustaf Jancke (1827–1900) and Maria Matilda Aimé née Björkenstam (1852–1945). In 1910, she married the physician Karl Gustaf Adolf Björk (1885–1919) with whom she had five children: Strindar Leif (1907), Arne (1910), Ann Eivor Margareta (1912), Lennart (1914) and Kaj Åke (1918). When she was 17, Eva Jancke attended the Technical School in Stockholm (1899–1904). After spending a year in Paris, she continued her studies of arts and crafts at the Artists' Association's school, later known as Konstfack.

She initially worked as a textile artist, creating patterns for Licium and Handarbetets vänner, and as an illustrator for the magazine Ord och Bild. In 1914, she moved with her husband to Gothenburg where he became a physician at the city's hospital. In 1966, she was introduced to Orrefors glassworks. The works she designed were included the following year in an exhibition at the NK department store in Stockholm, receiving acclaim in Stockholms Dagblad.

But it was increasingly in ceramics that Jancke-Björk developed her design work, first for the Rörstrand porcelain factory (1915–1921), then for Sankt Erik Lervarufabriker (1921–1925) and finally for Bo Fajans (1925–1956). After her husband died in 1919, she opened her own pottery in Mölndal, employing the potter Hugo Säfström from the local handicrafts school as well as other assistants. Designed in a simple, traditional style from locally soured clay, her works proved popular. In 1921, they were displayed in Gothenburg's central arcade and at Galleri Ny Konst. Thanks to a travel grant from the Swedish Arts and Crafts Association (Slöjdföreningen), she was able to study ceramics in Germany and Italy.

When her workshop burnt down a few years later, Jancke-Björk became a teacher at the Slöjdföreningen school which later became the School of Design and Crafts while continuing to work with Bo Fajans until 1956. Her early work included tea and coffee services, later designing bowls, vases, tableware and ceramic lampstands decorated with cornflowers or birds. In 1954, she developed the abstract design she called Pierrot.

Eva Jancke-Björk died in Stockholm on 2 January 1981, aged 98. Her works are included in the collections of many museums, including the Swedish National Museum of Fine Arts and the Röhsska Museum in Gothenburg.
