= Svante Nilsson (artist) =

Swedish engraver and musician (1869–1942)

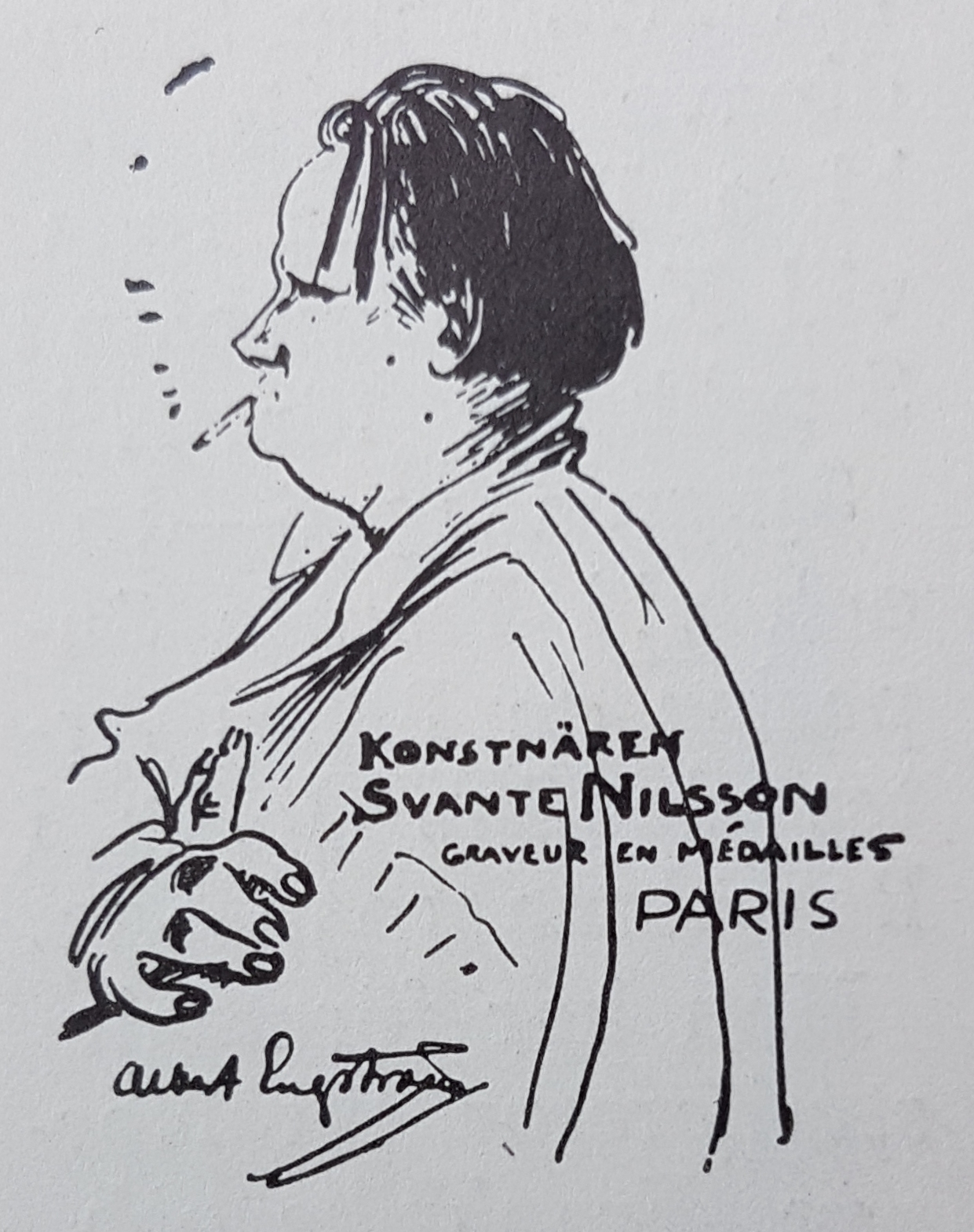
Svante Nilsson depicted by Albert Engström in 1909, photographed image from Allhem's Swedish Artists' Dictionary.

Svante Edvin Nilsson (10 June 1869 in Stockholm, Sweden – 21 May 1942 in Stockholm) was a Swedish medal engraver, medal artist, lyricist and lute singer.

== Biography ==
When Svante Nilsson was thirteen years old he began to study medal engraving for the Swedish engraver Adolf Lindberg (1839–1916) in Stockholm. Adolf Lindberg was a prestigious and reputable medal engraver in Sweden during the 1800s. After ten years of teaching in Stockholm Svante Nilsson mastered the art of producing the medal stamps. Then he was awarded the scholarship of Kommerskollegium in 1893, that he used to further education in Paris and Rome. Svante Nilsson remained in Paris. He collaborated with the Swedish medal engraver Sven Kulle (1860–1945), who resided in Paris in France. Sven Kulle had established a studio in Paris in 1891 where, among others, Svante Nilsson was employed. At the same time Nilsson also studied at École des Arts Décoratifs, a public university of art and design in Paris, the school is one of the most prestigious French grande école, and at Académie Colarossi, another art school in Paris. Svante Nilsson participated in several exhibitions during his years in Paris and he played a significant role in the Swedish art colony. His home became a gathering place for the Swedish art students. He stayed in Paris from 1893 to 1914. He returned to Sweden when the first world war broke out in 1914.

== Meritorious medals and plaques ==
Svante Nilsson has made many meritorious medals and plaques of famous people, such as the Swedish architect Ragnar Östberg, the Swedish architect and interior designer Carl Westman, the Swedish governor and senator Gustaf Tornérhjelm and the Swedish politician, party leader and Prime Minister of Sweden Hjalmar Branting.

== Represented ==
Svante Nilsson is represented at Nationalmuseum in Stockholm, Kungliga Myntkabinettet in Gamla stan in Stockholm, a Swedish museum in the Old Town of Stockholm. Sweden's premier, very rich coin and medal collections are to be found in Kungliga Myntkabinettet, not to be confused by Kungliga Myntet, Stockholm, where most of the medal stomping are stored. Svante Nilsson is also represented in Svenska statens porträttsamling at Gripsholm Castle in Mariefred. Now the castle is a museum which is open to the public, containing paintings and works of art. Part of the castle houses the National Collection of Portraits (Statens porträttsamlingar), one of the oldest portrait collection in the world.

== Musician ==
As a musician Svante Nilsson was an appreciated and popular lute singer. His speciality was Carl Michael Bellman (1740–1795), a Swedish poet and composer in the 18th century, and old French songs.

== Sources ==
- Svante Nilsson in Konstnärslexikonett Amanda (Swedish)
- Svante Nilsson in Projekt Runeberg, Svensk Konst, Nordisk Familjebok, page 677 (1926) Nordisk Familjebok, Uggleupplagan. 38. Supplement. Riksdagens bibliotek-Öyen. Tillägg. Page 677-678, 1926.
