= Gustaf Fjæstad =

Swedish painter (1868–1948)

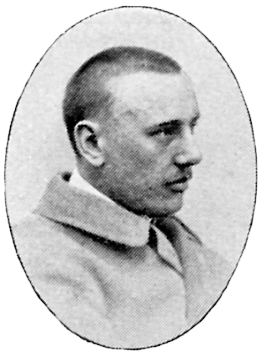
Gustaf Adolf Fjaestad

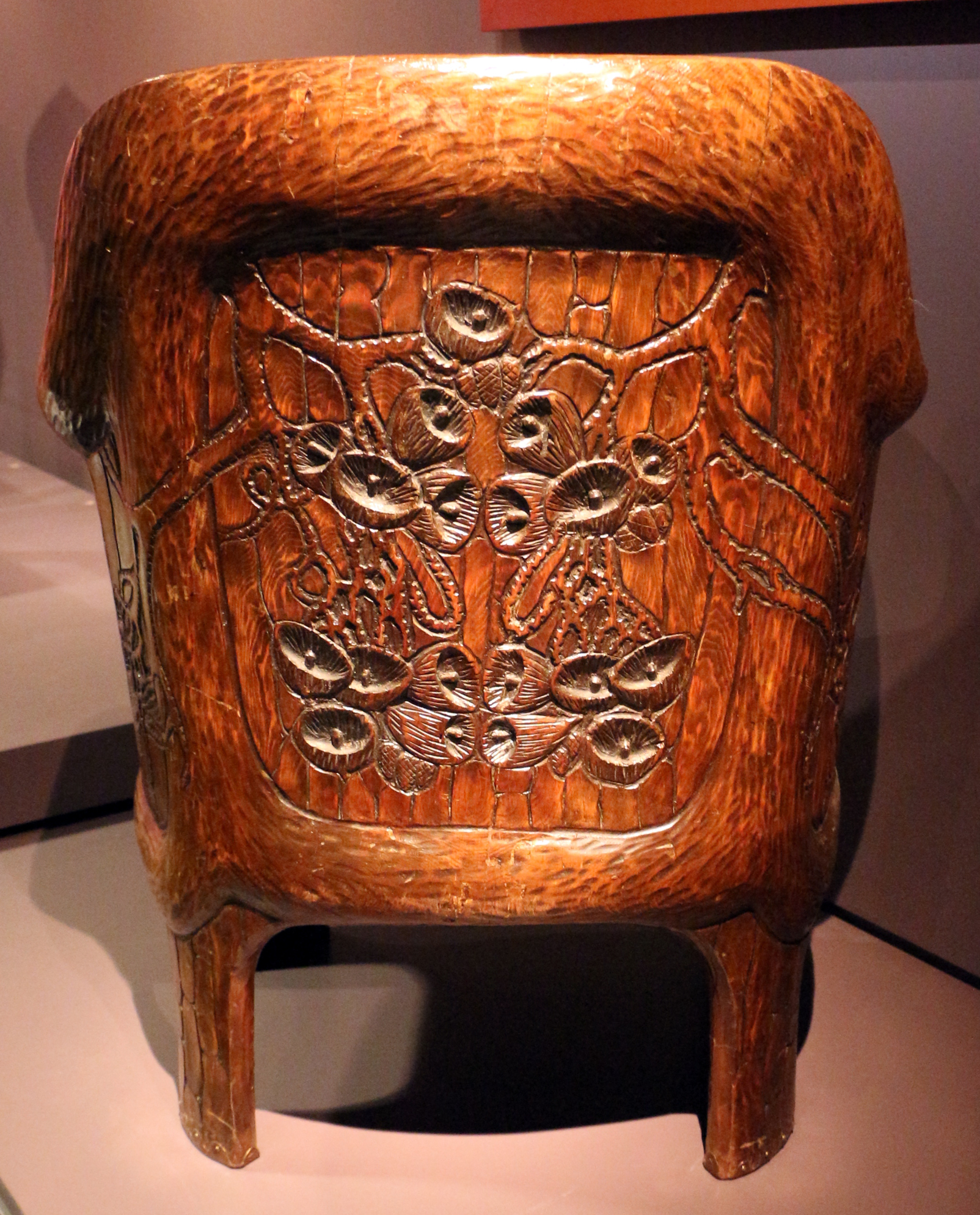
Armchair by Gustaf Fjæstad, 1905 ca., Musée d'Orsay, Paris

Gustaf Fjaestad (22 December 1868 – 17 July 1948) was a Swedish painter.

== Biography ==
Gustaf Adolf Christensen Fjæstad was born in Jakobs parish in the Diocese of Stockholm, Sweden. He was the son of Peder Christensen Fjæstad and Kristina Andersson. He studied at the Royal Swedish Academy of Fine Arts in 1891–1892 and then during 1893 at the Academy of the Arts (Konstnärsförbundets skola) operated by Richard Bergh in Stockholm.

Fjæstad belonged to the Artists' Association (Konstnärsförbundet). He assisted Bruno Liljefors during his decorative work for the Biological museum in Stockholm and collaborated with Carl Larsson on the murals now at the Stockholm National Museum. In 1897, he moved to Taserud near Arvika in Värmland. He held his first solo exhibition in Stockholm in 1908. In 1910 he again exhibited in Stockholm, in 1914 at Berlin and in 1927 at London. In 1932, a large exhibition of his works from later periods was shown at Värmlands Museum. After the first decade of the 20th century, he devoted himself principally to woodcraft. His work is found in many national and international collections. His work was part of the painting event in the art competition at the 1936 Summer Olympics.

== Personal life ==
Apart from painting, Fjæstad was also an accomplished cyclist. He won the inaugural Mälaren Runt around Lake Mälaren in 1892.

In 1898, he was married to artist Maja Fjæstad (1873–1961). They were the parents of four children including author Agneta Fjaestad (1901–1997). Both he and his wife were members of the Rackstad colony of artists at Arvika in Värmland, Sweden. He was buried at Arvika Cemetery.

== Gallery ==
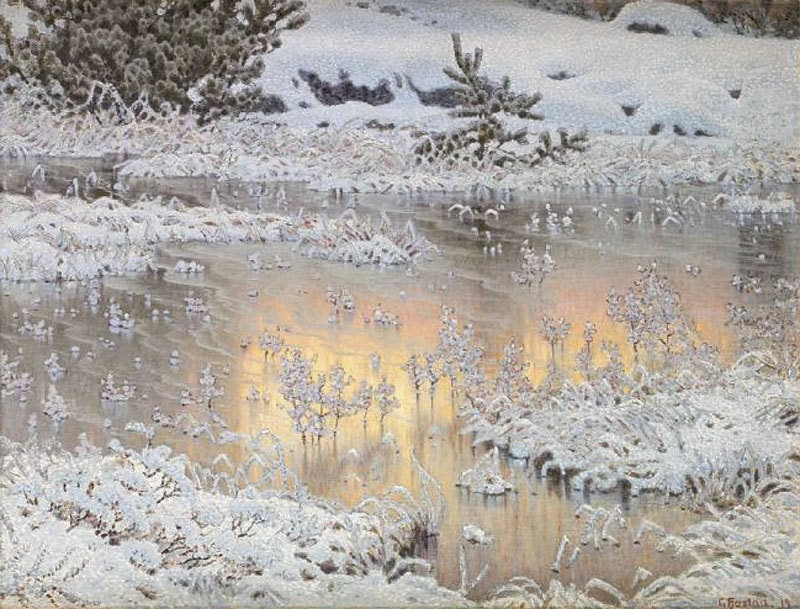
Frosty Morning (1919)

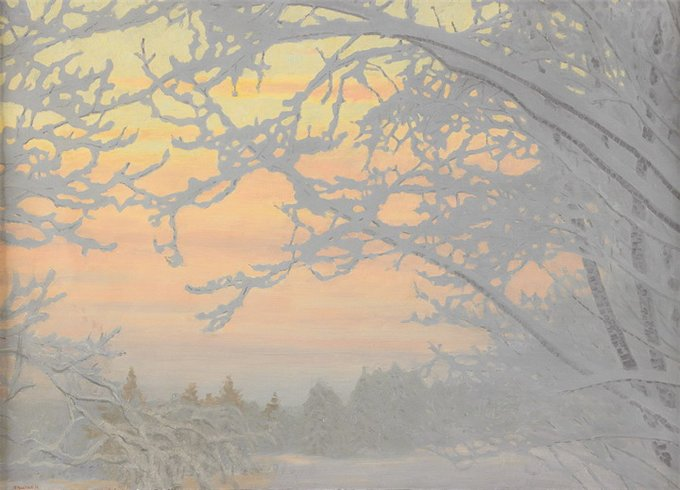
Cold winter evening (1897)

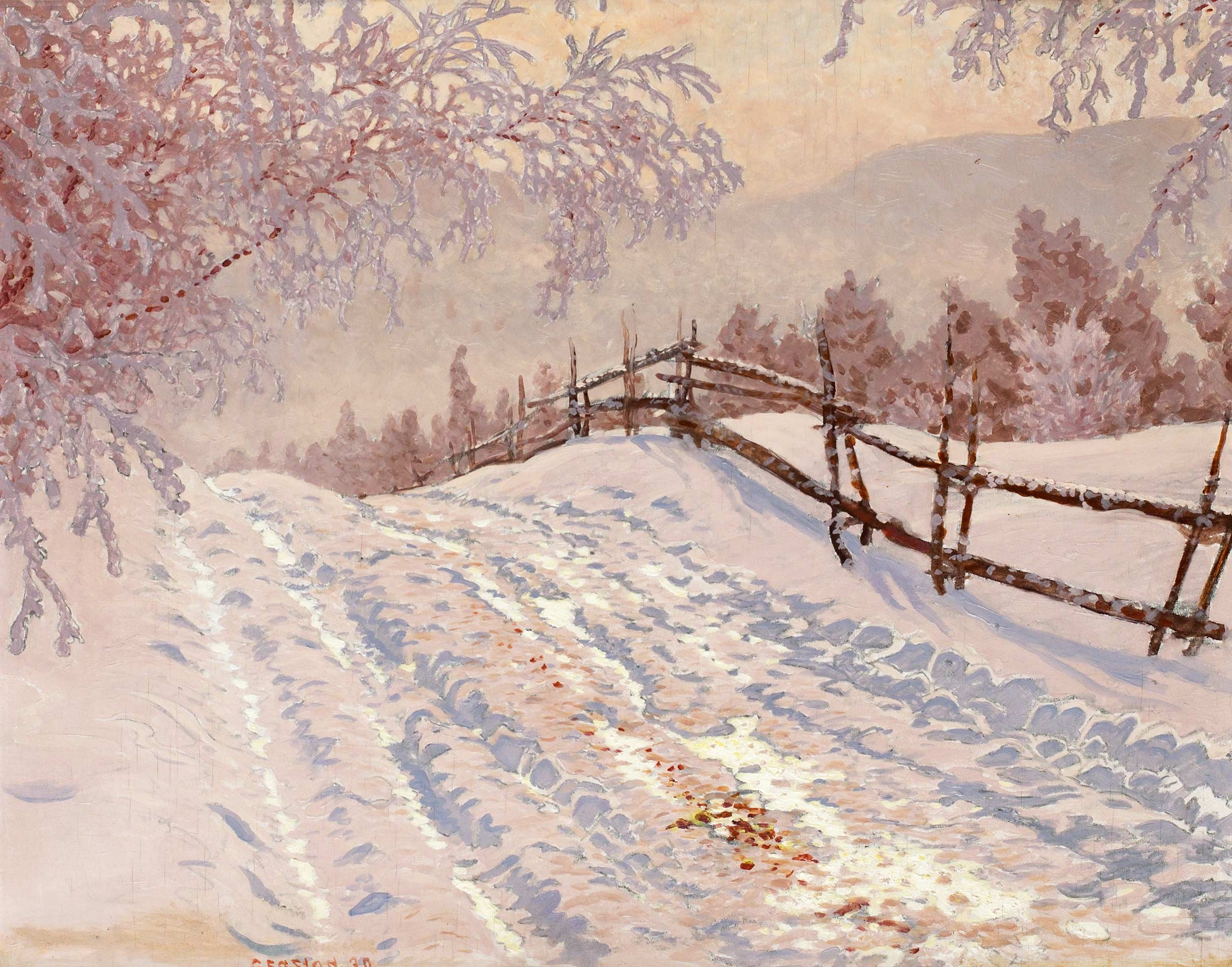
Snow Covered Road with Fence (1930)

== Other sources ==
- Fjaestad, Agneta (1981) Gustaf och Maja Fjaestad : ett konstnärspar (Karlstad: NWT Media AB)
- Nasgaard, Roald (1984) The Mystic North: Symbolist Landscape Painting in Northern Europe and North America, 1890-1940 (Toronto: University of Toronto Press)
- Holmquist-Wall, Erika (2006) The Idea of North: The Art of Gustaf Adolf Fjaestad (1868-1946) (Saint Paul, MN: University of St. Thomas)
