= Tekla Nordström =

Swedish artist (1856–1937)

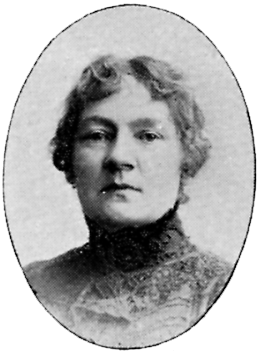
Tekla Nordström, from the Svenskt Porträttgalleri XX

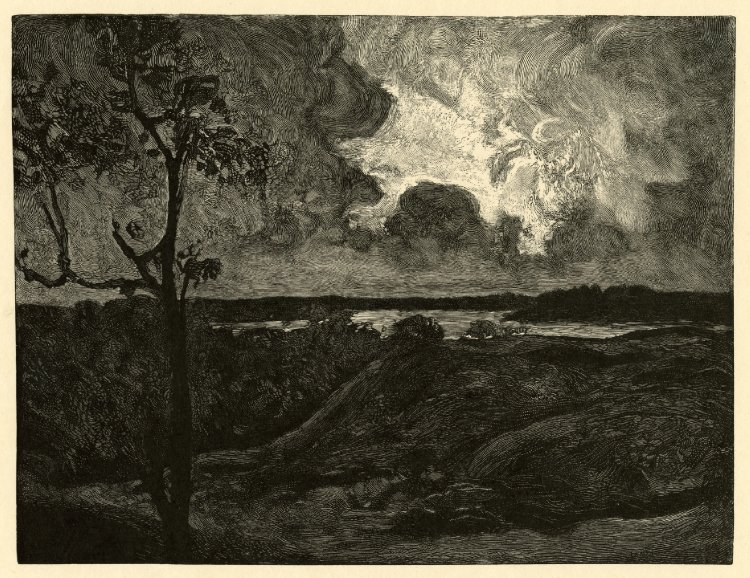
Autumn Moonlight Over Brunnsviken

Tekla Wilhelmina Nordström, née Lindeström (11 February 1856, Stockholm – 27 May 1937, Stockholm) was a Swedish xylographer.

== Biography ==
Her father, Nils Peter Lindeström, owned a company that made matches. In 1872, she became a student at the Tekniska skolan where she studied engraving with Johanna Carolina Weidenhayn and drawing with Henrik Nerpin. She decided to pursue xylography, studying first with Wilhelm Meyer then Jonas Engberg. From 1878 to 1880, she lived in Paris, where she studied with Engberg's teacher, Auguste Trichon, who was known for her engravings of bible illustrations by Gustave Doré. While there, she also worked for several periodicals, including L'Univers, and exhibited at the Salon.

From Paris, she went to the Swedish artists' colony at Grez-sur-Loing which, in 1882, included Carl Larsson, her future husband Karl Nordström, Richard Bergh, Johan Tirén, Karin Bergöö, Julia Beck and Emma Löwstedt. There, she began to produce her own illustrations, beginning with Larsson's drawings for Samlade skaldeförsök (Collected Poetic Essays), by Anna Maria Lenngren. In 1885, these and other works received honorable mention at the Salon. The following year, she married Nordström and they returned to Sweden; settling in Stockholm in 1888. Their daughter, Elsa Nordström, also became an artist.

She spent the following years making engravings and woodcuts of works by her husband, Bruno Liljefors, Richard Bergh, Georg Pauli, Eugène Jansson, Alfred Wahlberg and Nils Kreuger. She created many of her works using a freely applied burin. The responsibilities involved in raising three children often affected her artistic development. This was especially the case after 1918, when their son died of the Spanish flu and Karl became despondent.

Although she is mentioned in every history of xylography, her works are seldom reproduced. By the time of her death, her methods were considered to be old-fashioned. Some of her works may be seen at the Nationalmuseum and Prins Eugens Waldemarsudde.
