= Konstnärsförbundet =

Swedish artists' association

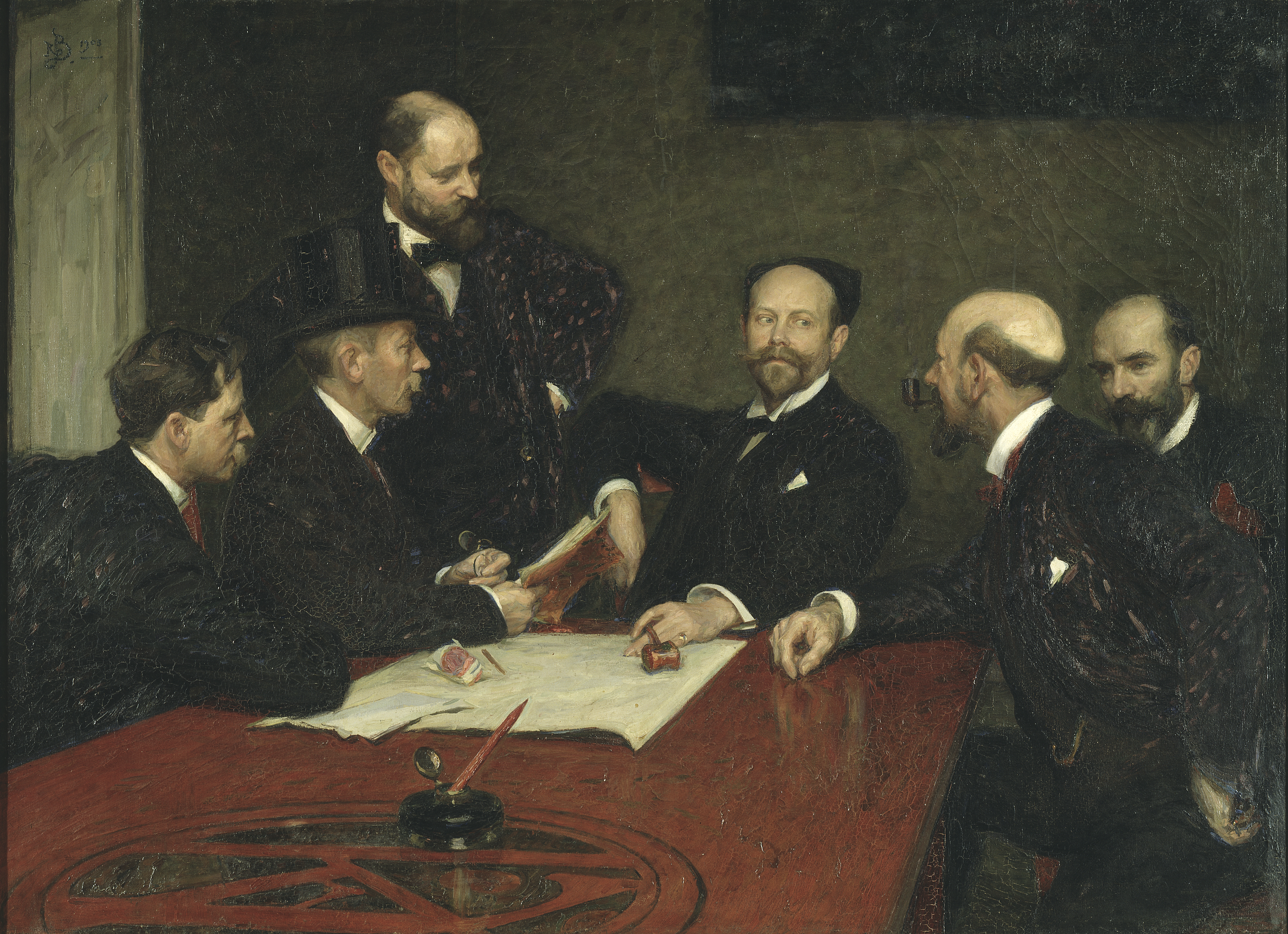
Konstnärsförbundets styrelse painted by Richard Bergh, 1903. From left: Christian Eriksson, Eugène Jansson, Nils Kreuger, Karl Nordström (chairman), Robert Thegerström and Richard Bergh

Konstnärsförbundet ('the Artists' Association') was an association of Swedish artists founded in 1886 in opposition to the Royal Swedish Academy of Fine Arts.

== Background and members ==
The association demanded reforms in the Academy's organization, education and exhibition activities. The association's two exhibitions, "Från Seinens strand" ('From the Shores of the Seine') and "Opponenternas utställning" ('The Opponents' Exhibition'), are regarded as the breakthrough for French-inspired plein air painting in Swedish art. Some of the most important members were Nils Kreuger, Karl Nordström, Richard Bergh, J. A. G. Acke, Per Ekström, Gustaf Fjæstad, Per Hasselberg, Eugène Jansson, Ernst Josephson, Björn Ahlgrensson, Eva Bonnier, Bruno Liljefors, Carl Larsson, Axel Sjöberg, Carl Wilhelmson, Christian Eriksson, and Hanna and Georg Pauli.

The association dissolved in 1920.

== History ==
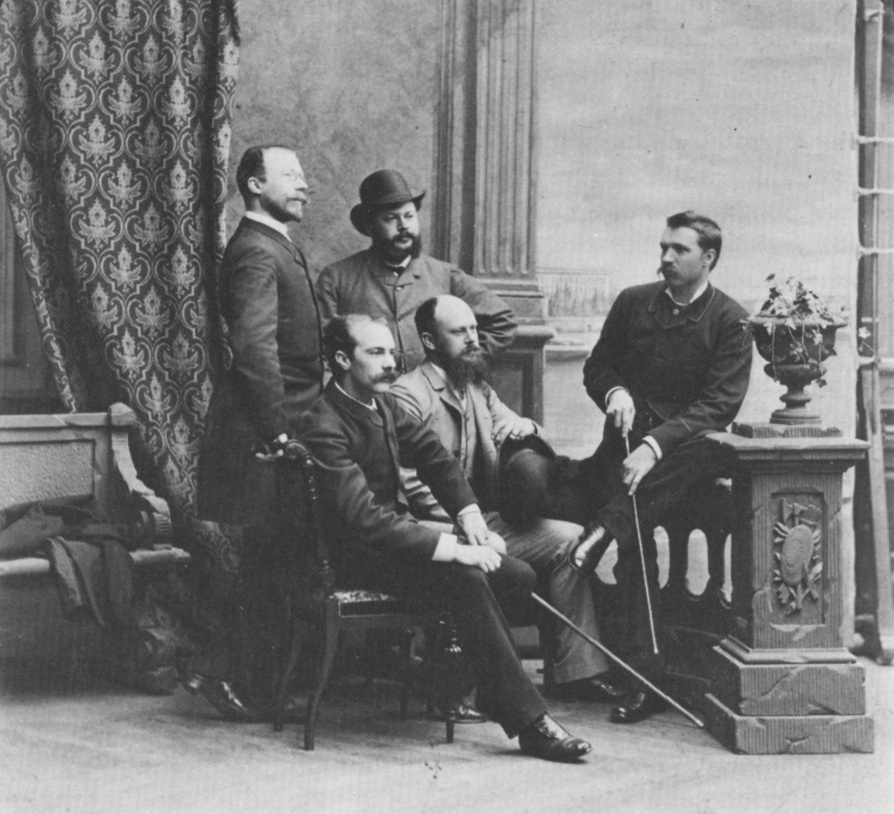
Studio photograph with some of the leaders of Opponenterna. Standing from left: Carl Larsson and Ernst Josephson. Sitting from left: Richard Bergh, August Hagborg and Per Hasselberg.

=== Dissatisfaction with the academy ===
Konstnärsförbundet emerged from the opposition movement, a resistance to the organization of the Academy of Fine Arts in the mid-1880s. The Academy's slowness in organizing exhibitions prompted the Swedish artists' colony near Paris to plan its own exhibition in Stockholm. The matter was discussed and settled in the spring of 1884 when it was decided that the exhibition would take place the following spring. In November 1884, the Academy of Fine Arts also decided to organize an exhibition in connection with the 150th anniversary of the Academy in the autumn of the following year.

During this time, there was some friction in the Stockholm art world. Ernst Josephson published two sensational articles in Dagens Nyheter on 29 November and 10 December, "Om den konstnärliga uppfostran i Stockholm" ('On artistic education in Stockholm').

=== Letter submitted to the Academy ===
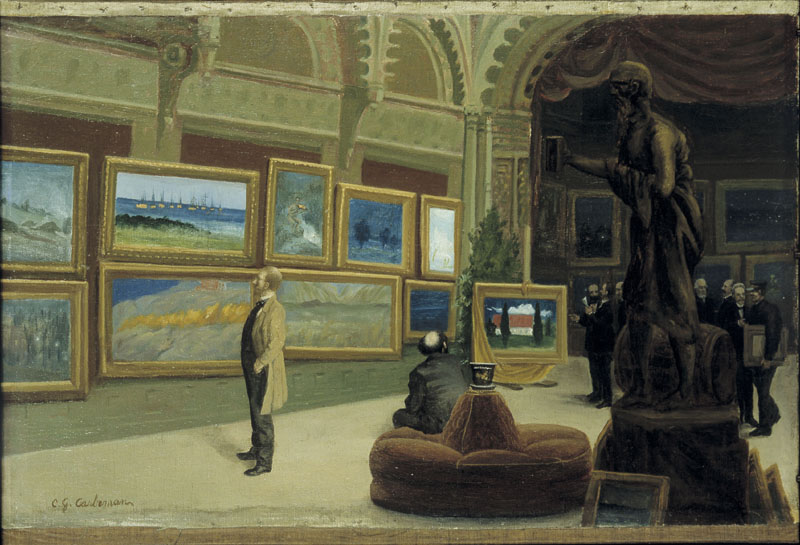
Blanch's art salon in the 1890s, painting by Gustaf Carleman. The two revolutionary exhibitions were held here: Från Seinens strand and Opponenternas utställning.

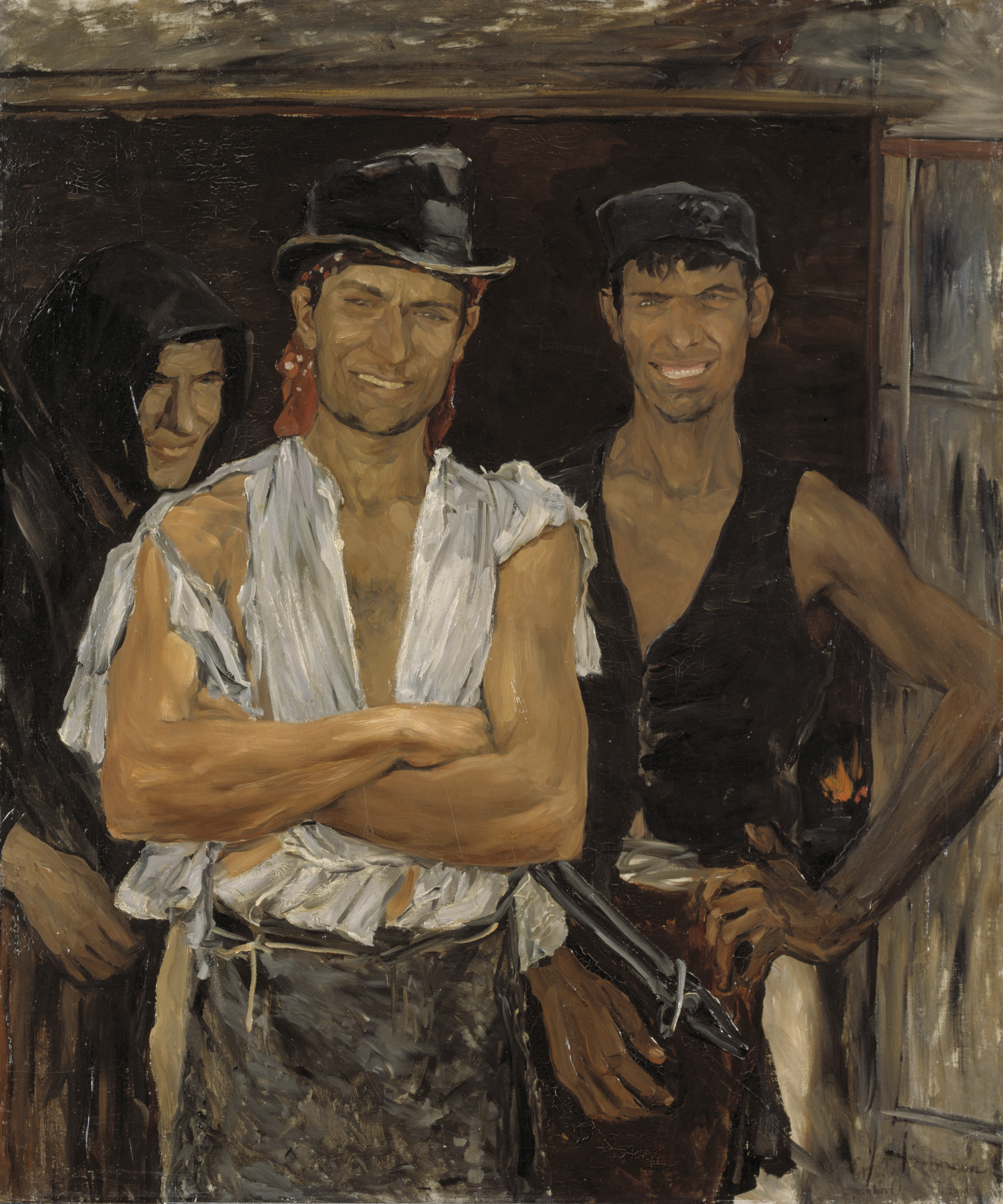
Spanska smeder by Ernst Josephson. One of the paintings in the exhibition Från Seinens strand.

When Ernst Josephson returned to Paris from Stockholm at Christmas time, the artists there agreed to write a letter to the Academy requesting "action to be taken to set up a committee of Swedish artists, half of whom would be elected by the Academy and half by the undersigned, to draw up proposals for the reorganization of the Academy". A number of desirable objectives for the reforms were also mentioned in the letter.

The letter was signed by 84 Swedish artists in Paris, London, Düsseldorf, Stockholm and elsewhere. Those who signed were from varying age groups and backgrounds. The group of female artists who signed included Julia Beck, Hildegard Thorell, Emma Löwstädt-Chadwick, Anna Nordgren, Jenny Nyström and Julia Strömberg. The letter was then submitted to the Academy on 27 March 1885 by Ernst Josephson.

In April, the exhibition of the Swedish artists near Paris "Från Seinens strand" ('From the Shores of Seine') opened in Theodor Blanch's art salon. It included 100 works by 18 exhibitors.

On 30 May, the Academy declined to answer the Opponents' letter and referred them to the king. A large number of them had pledged that if the Academy ignored their request, they would terminate all contact with the Academy and accept no awards from it. They could therefore not participate in the academic anniversary exhibition. Instead, they decided to organize their own exhibition at the same time. Thus the "Opponenternas utställning" ('Opponents' Exhibition'), which opened on 15 September in Blanch's art salon, featured 155 works of art by 50 exhibitors.

In the summer of 1886, artists from both camps participated in the Scandinavian exhibition, which took place in Gothenburg, organized by the Valand company. Pontus Fürstenberg, a patron of the arts, supported the effort. Then came the news that King Oscar II had refused their request for the appointment of the committee.

=== Konstnärsförbundet is founded ===
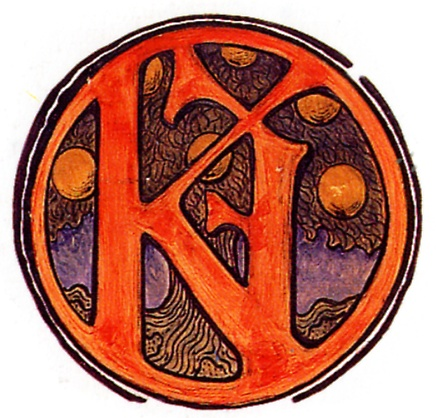
Konstnärsförbundet's emblem, painted by Nils Kreuger

The Opponents, who had already agreed at the beginning of the year to join in an association, formed Konstnärsförbundet at a meeting on 18 August in Hotell Christiania in Gothenburg. Their aim was "to oppose all antiquities which may be injurious, and to promote all reforms which may be considered beneficial to our domestic art and art industry". One of the most pressing tasks was the organization of annual exhibitions, and as early as 8 October the first exhibition bearing the name of Konstnärsförbundet was opened in Stockholm. It included 150 works by 59 exhibitors.

The association had two co-operating boards – one in Stockholm and one in Paris (the latter dissolved around 1892). They produced a small pamphlet, "Hvad bör staten göra för konsten?" ('What should the state do for art?') (1887) which can be considered their platform. It proposed simplifying and economizing the organization of the Academy, which would allow greater sums to be allocated to the purchase of works of art. Exhibitions were held in Gothenburg in 1887 and in Stockholm in 1888, after which Konstnärsförbundet took the initiative to ensure that Swedish art was represented at the 1889 World's Fair in Paris – all without support from the state.

=== New conflicts ===
The following years brought sharp breaks in the artistic world. The Academy's new statutes of 1887 did not satisfy the reformers, who essentially fought for the artists' right to decide on artistic matters. The question of how the annual public exhibitions should be organized was the most pressing one, and the wish was expressed that artists from both sides should unite in a single association to take charge of these exhibitions.

Money for the construction of an exhibition building had been collected since 1882 on the initiative of Konstnärsklubben ('the Artists' Club') through art lotteries, one of which was organized by Konstnärsförbundet. On 19 August 1890, on the initiative of both parties, Svenska konstnärernas förening ('the Swedish Artists' Association') was formed with the aim of bringing together competing groups within the artists' community and creating a legal entity that would be the owner of the proposed Konstnärshuset ('Artists' House').

However, new conflicts soon arose. The Academy, which had received a state grant in 1890 to rebuild its building, began to prepare for its own extensive exhibition floor. This was while the proposed exhibition building of the artists' association crept together into one room, which was furnished in Konstnärshuset. The Academy offered the artists' association free use of the Academy's new exhibition hall for two months each year, but this was rejected by Konstnärsförbundet.

The position of Konstnärsförbundet within the Swedish Artists' Association was unclear from the outset. The association refused to support Konstnärsförbundet's demands and soon there was a definitive break between the two groups.

=== During the 1900s ===
For a number of years, Konstnärsförbundet fought for its right, when participating in major exhibitions, to perform as its own group and with its own jury – an arrangement that was first fully consistently implemented at the exhibition in Munich in 1901 and which was subsequently taken up by other Swedish artists' groups as well.

The association organized a number of exhibitions in Stockholm, Gothenburg, Malmö, Uppsala, Copenhagen, Helsinki and Berlin. It participated in the major exhibitions in Chicago in 1893, Berlin in 1896, and in Stockholm in 1897 with its own jury. At the World's Fair in Paris in 1900, Konstnärsförbundet organized the Swedish art section.

In 1890, the association started its own art school, Konstnärsförbundets skola ('the Artists' Society School'), which operated until 1908, with a few interruptions. Teachers there included Richard Bergh, Anders Zorn, Christian Eriksson, Karl Nordström, Eugène Jansson, Nils Kreuger, Robert Thegerström and Knut Kjellberg, who taught anatomy. Some of its students then made their public debut with "De ungas utställning" 'the Youth Exhibition' in the spring of 1909.

In 1886, the association counted its membership at 92. In 1890, the number reached 96. After the outbreak of conflict, the number was significantly reduced and in 1910, the number was down to 21 members, and artists such as Carl Larsson, Anders Zorn and Georg Pauli left. Karl Nordström became the leader of Konstnärsförbundet in its later years. Alongside him was Richard Bergh, who in 1905 published the book Hvad vår kamp gällt ('What Our Struggle Has Concerned'). 1910 saw the last foreign exhibition in Berlin, and 1916 the last Swedish exhibition. Konstnärsförbundet was dissolved in 1920.
