= Edvard Perséus =

Swedish painter

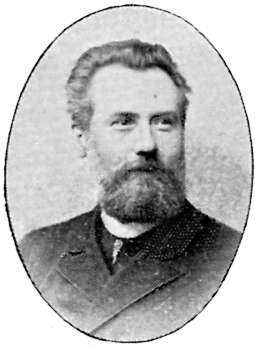
Edvard Perséus, from the Svenskt Porträttgalleri XX

Edvard Perséus, originally Persson (23 December 1841, in Lund – 7 October 1890, in Stockholm) was a Swedish painter and hovintendent (a form of superintendent) at the Royal Court of Sweden. He specialized in historical and genre scenes.

== Biography ==
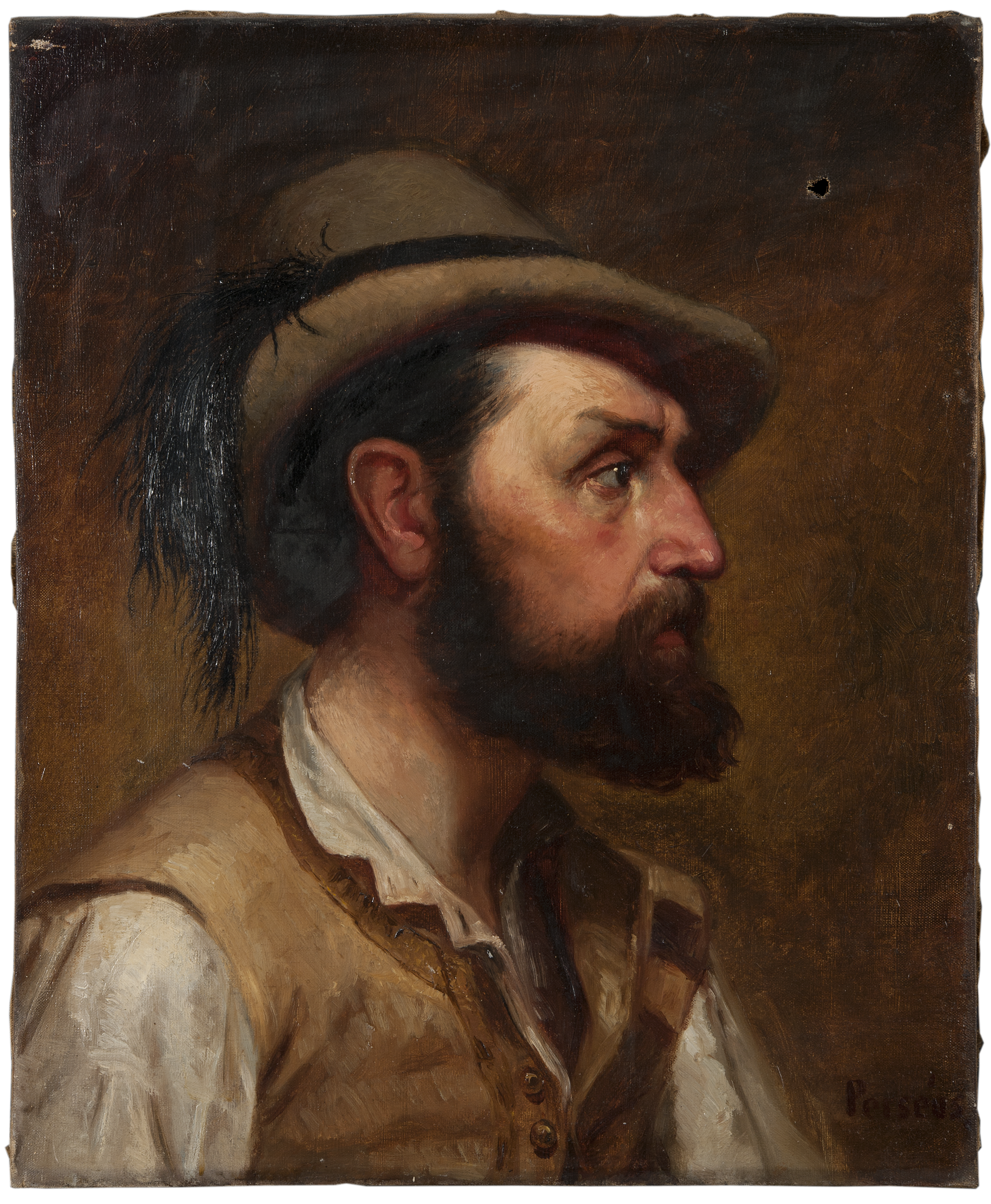
Self-portrait as a Hunter

He was born to a working-class family and originally worked as a commercial painter in Lund. During his apprenticeship, he decided to become an artist and took the name Perséus. His first lessons came from a local artist, Magnus Körner. In 1861, he was able to go to Stockholm and enroll at the Royal Swedish Academy of Fine Arts, where he studied with Johan Christoffer Boklund. He moved to Düsseldorf in 1867, then went to Munich and worked in the studios of Karl von Piloty. While there, in 1873, he married Agnes Claesson.

A scholarship enabled him to complete his studies in Italy and France. In 1875, he returned to Stockholm and opened a private painting school, which was very successful. His style was said to be informal; generally coming to class in slippers with a cigar in his mouth. He was apparently also quite talkative and often showed his students items from his collections of old books and engravings. In addition, he would try to interest them in painting his own favorite historical subjects, but anything was acceptable as long as it came naturally. He often behaved as a companion for his youngest students.

From 1879 to 1889, he received an artist's fee and a share of their tuition from the Royal Academy. He never subscribed to any reforms or protests about current teaching methods or styles. The key to his success was simple encouragement; believing that if you were honest and diligent and "if you were alive", you could learn to paint.

Among his best known students were Richard Bergh, Oscar Björck, Nils Kreuger, Eugène Jansson, Carl Fredrik von Saltza, J. A. G. Acke, Robert Thegerström, Johan Tirén, Johan Krouthén, Axel Jungstedt and Karl Nordström. Most of them later graduated from the Royal Academy.

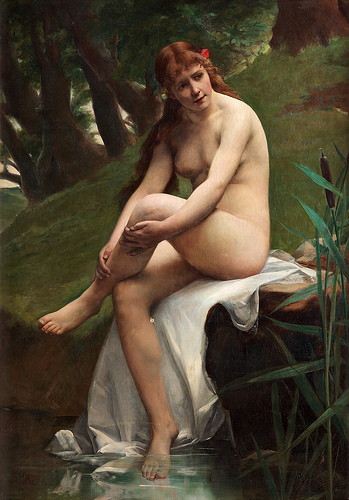
Nude Model (1872)

In 1882, he was appointed hovintendent and was responsible for King Oscar's art collection. His works may be seen at the Nationalmuseum, Göteborgs konstmuseum and the Waldemarsudde. He is buried at the Norra begravningsplatsen.
