= Robert Thegerström =

Swedish painter and graphic artist

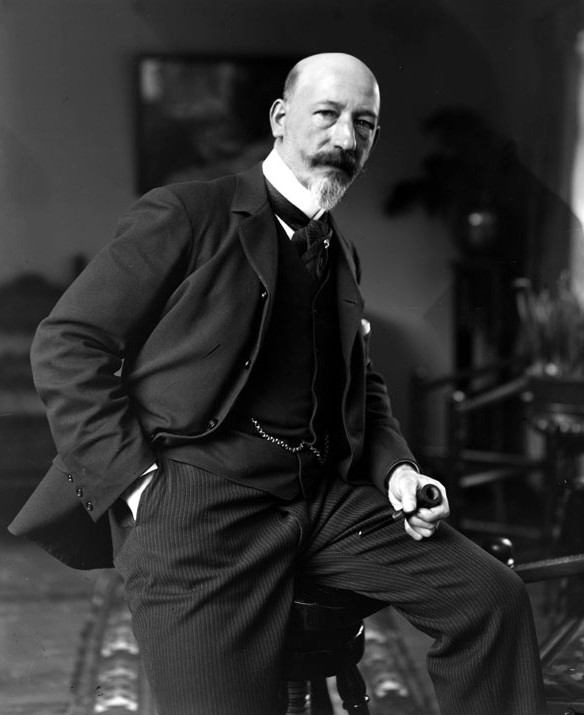
Robert Thegerström (1907)

Robert Thegerström (6 January 1857 – 9 August 1919) was a Swedish painter and graphic artist.

== Biography ==
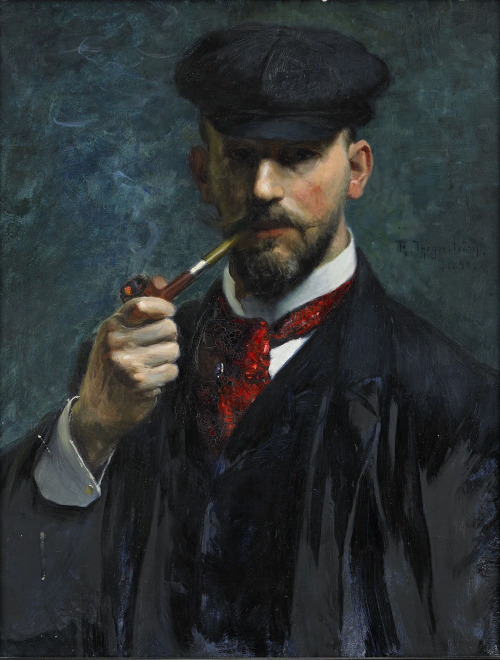
Self-portrait (before 1895)

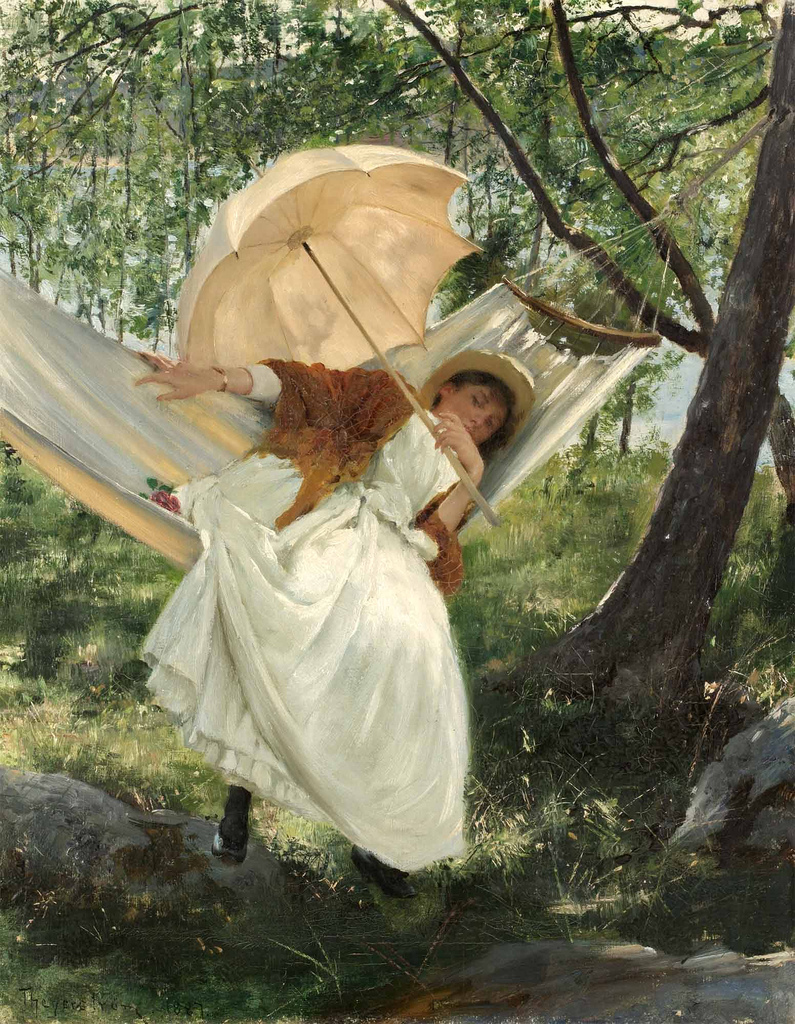
Lättja (1887)

Robert Thegerström was born in London where his father, Johan Robert Thegerström, was a wholesale merchant. After finishing his primary education, he worked in his father's company for a year before entering the Royal Swedish Academy of Fine Arts. His fellow students there included Ernst Josephson, Carl Larsson, Bruno Liljefors and Richard Bergh, who would later join to create a dissident group known as the Opponent movement (Opponenterna) who were seeking modernization and reform of art education, exhibition activities and artist support. After finishing his studies in 1880, he went to Paris. He would remain in France for twelve years.

He studied figure and landscape painting at several famous studios, including the Académie Julian. Being financially sound was one of the things that made him a central figure in the expatriate Swedish art community. In 1881, he travelled with Swedish painters Karl Nordström and Allan Österlind to paint in Lyons-la-Forêt and spent several summers at the art colony in Grez-sur-Loing.

In 1887, he met Elin Lamm (1865–1931), a cousin of Emma Zorn (1860–1942), wife of the painter, Anders Zorn. He and Zorn became good friends; accompanying him on a study trip to Spain and Morocco. After his return, he married Elin Lamm and they took their honeymoon in Egypt, where he made numerous sketches of the people and architecture. In 1889, he won third-class medals for his pastels at the Exposition Universelle. Later, together with Zorn and Bergh, he made visits to Dalarö, Sweden, where he had the opportunity to paint a portrait of August Strindberg in 1891.

He and his family returned to Sweden to stay in 1892. He soon began producing moody landscapes from Djursholm and Särö. After 1893, he built and lived at Villa Tallbacken, one of the first houses in Djursholm, designed by Ferdinand Boberg. It eventually became a gathering point for the artistic community.

From 1895 to 1896, he studied graphic arts with Axel Tallberg, and began creating mezzotints. He also produced paintings for the staircase at the Royal Dramatic Theatre. In 1911 and 1918, he held major exhibitions at the Swedish Public Art Association (Sveriges allmänna konstförening). Several more filled the years leading up to World War I including, the Baltic Exhibition of 1914. He occasionally served as a teacher at the Artists' Association School (Konstnärsförbundets skola).

His works is exhibited at the Nationalmuseum, Prins Eugens Waldemarsudde, Gothenburg Museum of Art and the Östergötlands nation in Uppsala.

== Sources ==
- Svenskt konstnärslexikon Part V, pgs. 415–416, Allhems Förlag, Malmö
- Biography from the Nordisk Familjebok @ Project Runeberg
- Biography from the Svenskt Biografiskt Handlexikon @ Project Runeberg
