= Hedvig Hamilton =

Swedish painter (1870–1949)

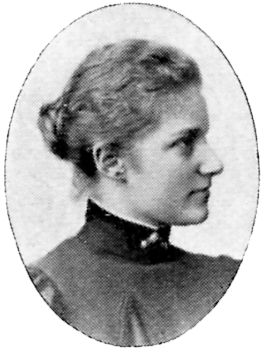
- Born: 9 December 1870; Lund
- Died: 11 December 1949 (aged 79); Hedvig Eleonora Parish
- Occupation: painter

Hedvig Eleonora Hamilton (9 December 1870 – 11 December 1949) was a Swedish portrait painter working in watercolour and oils.

== Life ==
Hamilton was born in Lund in 1870.

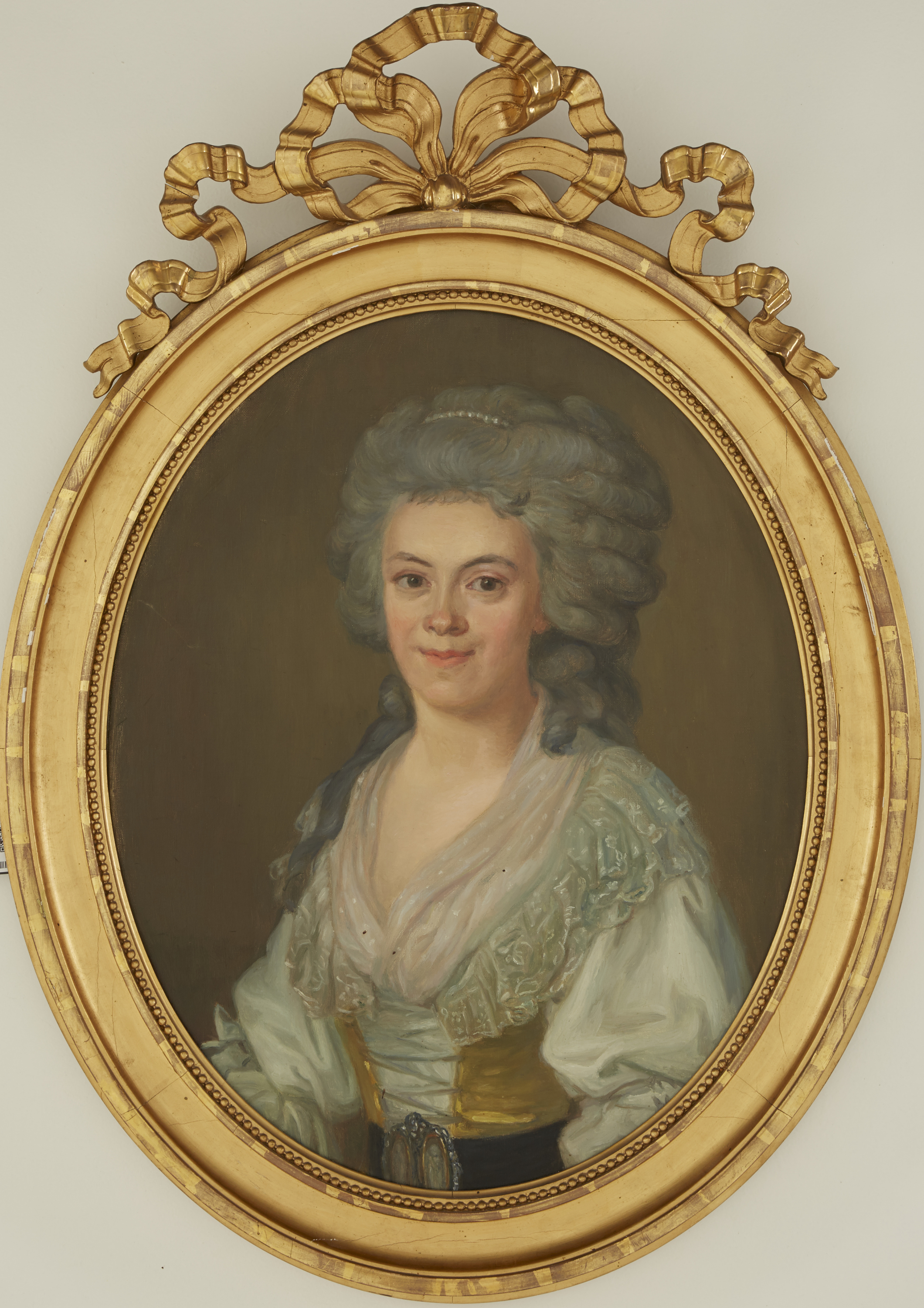
Beata Elisabeth Hamilton By Hedvig Hamilton after (prob.) Lorens Pasch

She painted portraits, self portraits, and landscapes with Stockholm motifs in oil and watercolor. She attended the Tegne- og Kunstindustriskolen for Kvinde in Copenhagen. She studied further with the artist Richard Burgh in Stockholm under Richard Bergh. She studied further in France and Germany.

Hamilton died in Stockholm in 1949. She was buried locally.
