= Opponenterna =

19th-century Swedish artist group

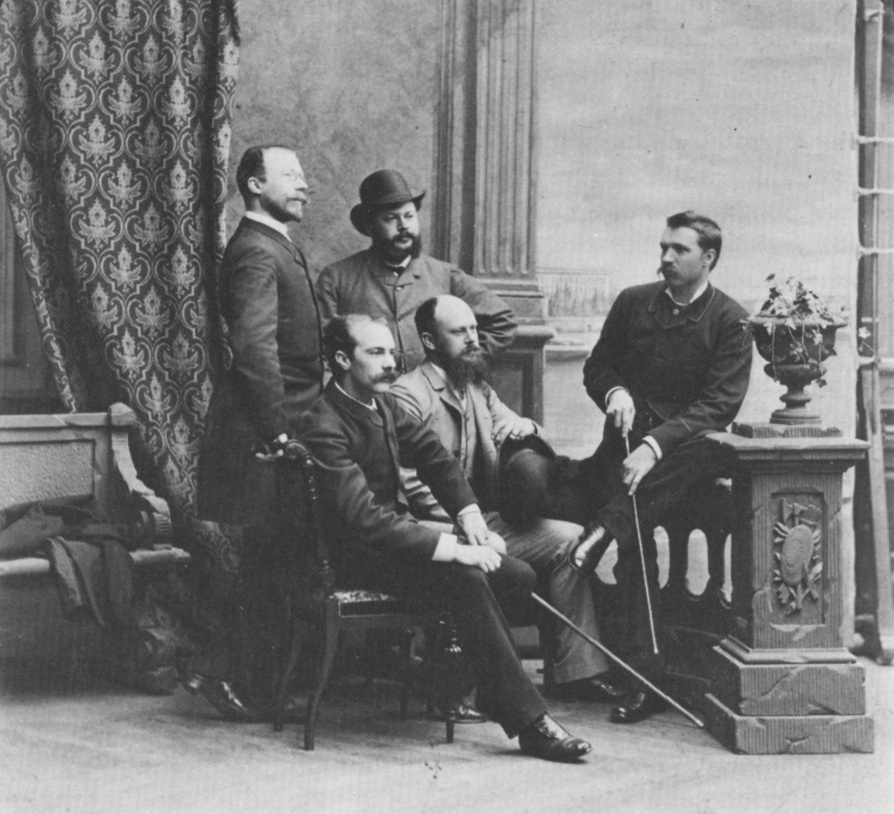
Studio photo with some of the leaders of the Opponents. Standing from left: Carl Larsson and Ernst Josephson. Seated from left: Richard Bergh, August Hagborg and Per Hasselberg.

Opponenterna ('the Opponents') was a group of 84 Swedish artists who, under the leadership of Ernst Josephson, organized the Opponent Movement (Opponentrörelsen) in the 1880s. On 27 March 1885, the members submitted their written demands to the Royal Swedish Academy of Fine Arts for a modernization and reform of art education, exhibition activities and support for artists. However, their demands were rejected, which in turn led to the formation of the Konstnärsförbundet ('the Artists' Association') the following year.

== Members ==
The movement primarily consisted of young artists, who had been to Paris and the Swedish artists' colony in Grez-sur-Loing and were influenced by French painting, which soon had a great impact on the Swedish public as well. Some of the Opponents included August Hagborg, Per Hasselberg, Gusten Lindberg, Ernst Josephson, Carl Larsson, Eugène Jansson, Richard Bergh, Arvid Mauritz Lindström, Karl Nordström, Johan Krauthén, and Georg Pauli. Most of them were stationed on Dalarö in the summers.

== Exhibitions ==
The Opponents' first exhibition took place at Theodor Blanch's art salon in Stockholm on 15 September 1885. The vernissage consisted of 155 exhibited works by 59 different artists.

== See also ==
- Konstnärsförbundet
- Konstnärsförbundets skola
