= Eugène Jansson =

Swedish painter (1862–1915)

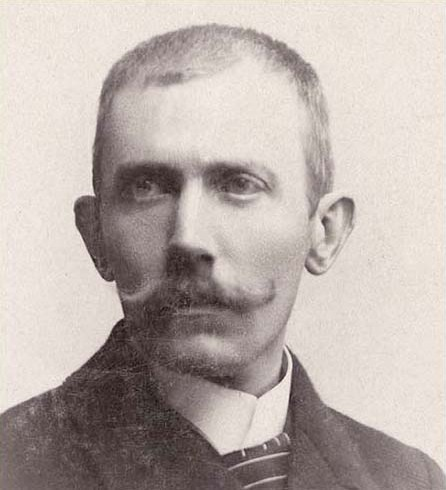
Eugène Jansson

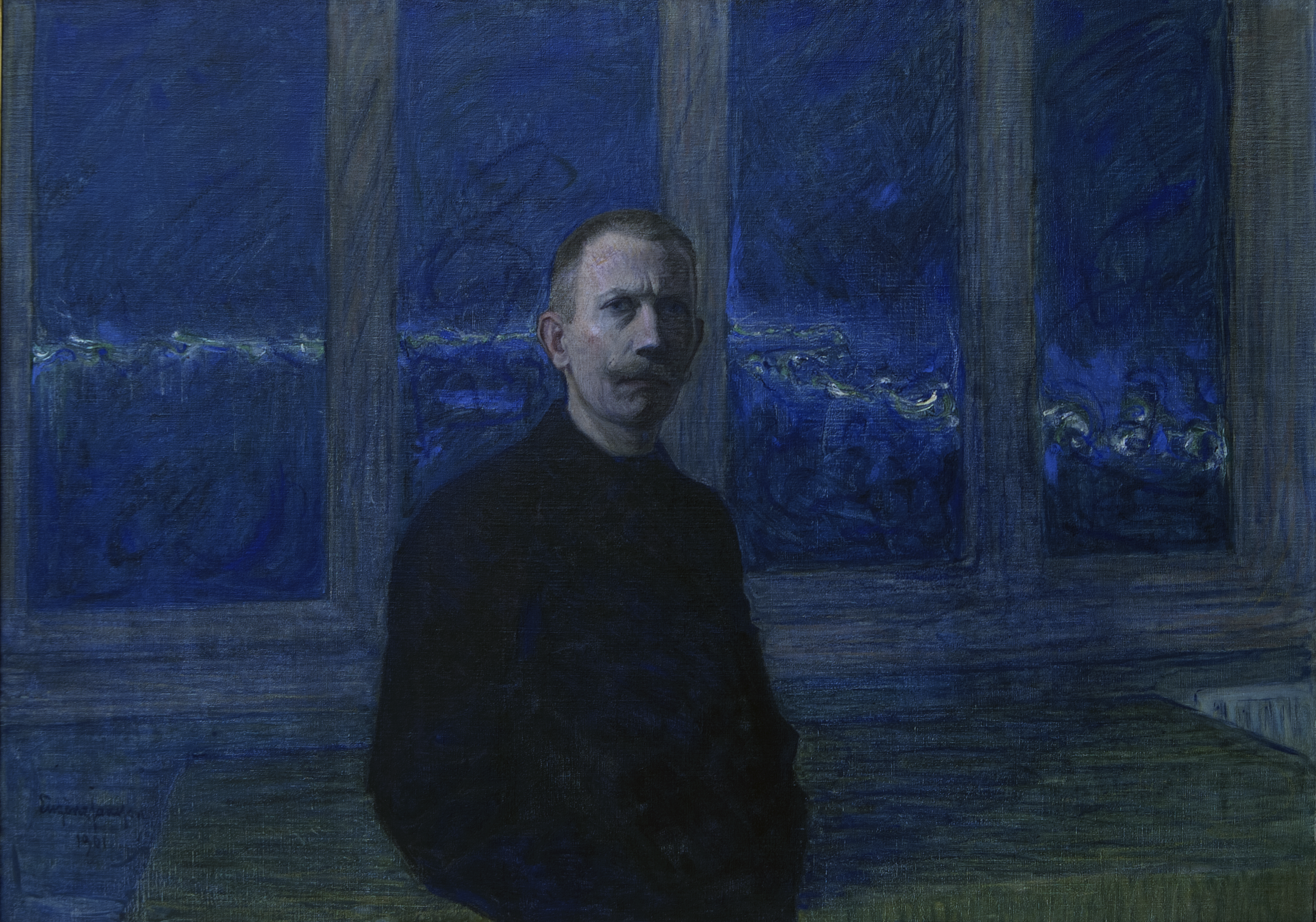
I. Self-portrait, 1901 The Thiel Gallery

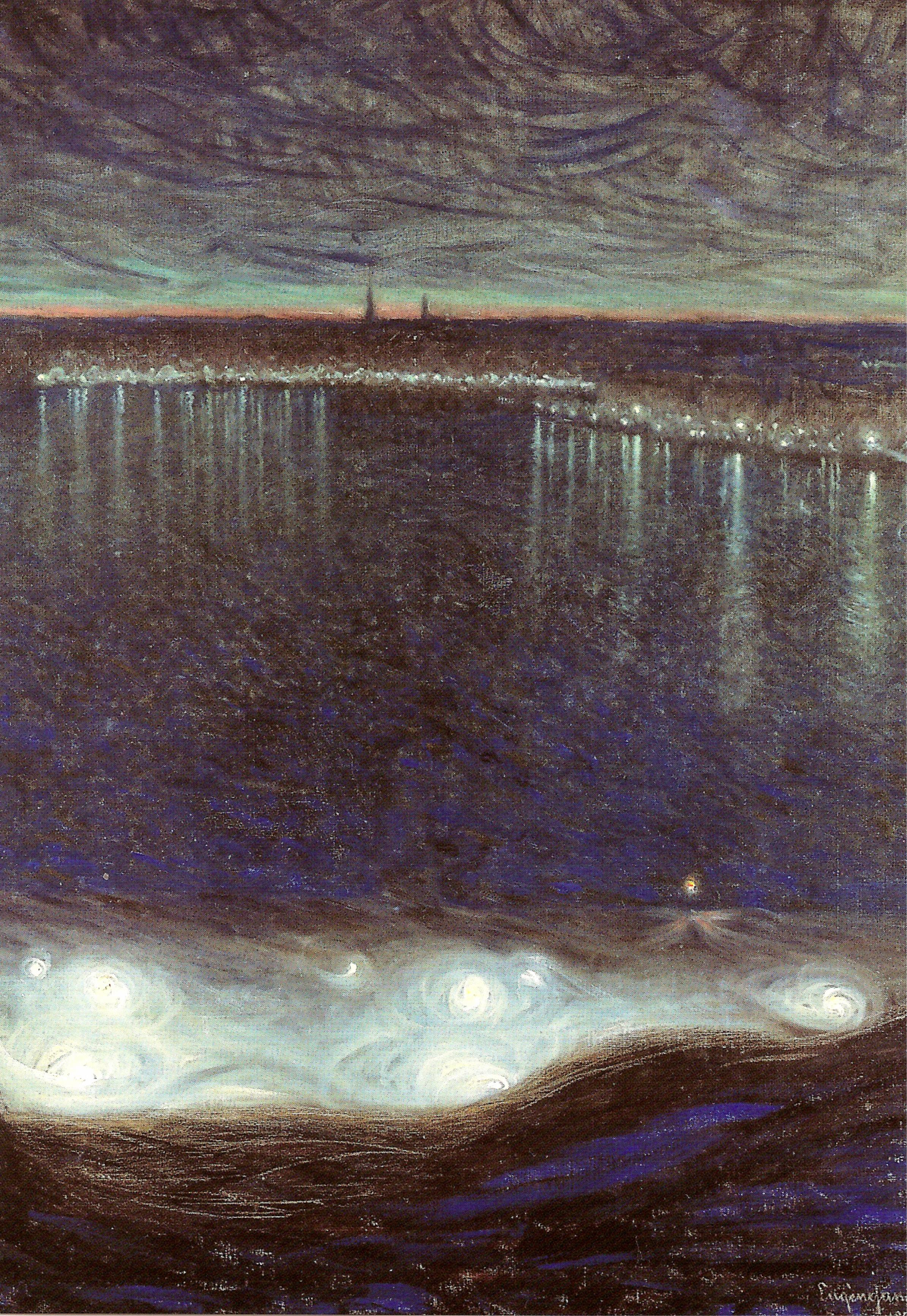
Riddarfjärden in Stockholm, 1898, Nationalmuseum (cropped image)

Eugène Fredrik Jansson (18 March 1862 – 15 June 1915) was a Swedish painter known for his night-time land- and cityscapes dominated by shades of blue. Towards the end of his life, from about 1904, he mainly painted male nudes. The earlier of these phases has caused him to sometimes be referred to as blåmålaren, "the blue-painter".

Queer commentators have described Jansson as Sweden's first gay artist, a reputation based primarily on his male nudes.

== Life ==
Jansson was born in Stockholm. His parents, Eugenia and Frederik, belonged to a social stratum straddling the working and the lower middle class, but they were interested in art and music and ambitious for their two sons, Eugène and his younger brother Adrian. His father was a postal messenger, and a skilled amateur flautist, while his wife had aspired to be a professional singer and painted still lifes for her own enjoyment. Eugène went to the German School in Stockholm and took piano lessons. After a retinal detachment and diagnosis of a severe congenital heart conditioner, an attack of scarlet fever at the age of fourteen caused him health issues from which he suffered for the rest of his life, including bad eyesight and hearing and chronic kidney problems.

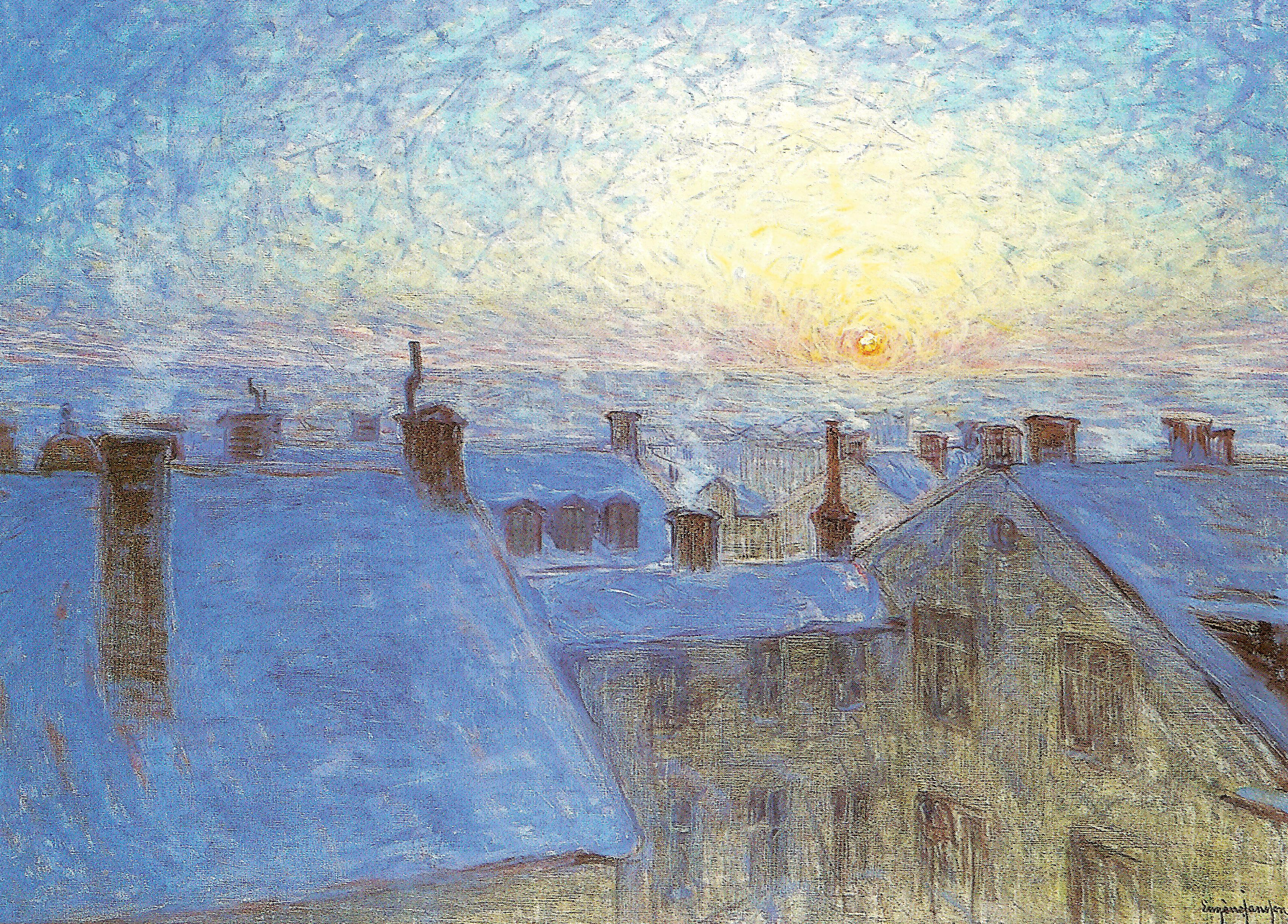
Sunrise over the rooftops, 1903 (Nationalmuseum, Stockholm (image is cropped)

Jansson enrolled in the Tekniska skolan (now Konstfack) in 1878 and studied with Edvard Perséus, a painter who ran a private art school in Stockholm. He was accepted into the Antique school of the Royal Swedish Academy of Arts in 1881, but did not have the means to follow most of his contemporaries to Paris for further studies. Remaining in Stockholm, which supplied him most of his motifs, his first trip outside the Nordic countries would come in 1900, when he had already become well-established as a painter and his economic situation had started to improve. In his youth, he assisted Perséus in his portrait production and painted some still lifes, but he eventually found his favourite motifs in the city surrounding him. Perséus was a leader in the Oppenenterna, a group of radical artists who wished to revolutionized cultural life in Sweden, and Jansson, a committed socialist, participated in the movement. He was also a founding memory of the Artists' Union in 1886 which intended to provide an alternative to the Academy and develop artists. He had many friends through his artist groups, including Perséus and Karl Nördstrom.

After the death of Perséus in 1890, Jansson depended on financial support from his father, but Frederik died of pleurisy in 1891 and Jansson became head of household. He moved with his mother and brother at Södermalm, the economically-depressed southern part of Stockholm. They eventually settled in a flat at No. 40 Bastugatan, on a height with a view over most of central Stockholm including the Riddarfjärden bay and the Old town. Most of his paintings from the 1890s up to 1904 are night views over Riddarfjärden, as he would have seen it from his home, or street views from various parts of Södermalm. They are dominated by shades of blue and very visible brush strokes, often crossing one another. Over the years his paintings moved towards increasing simplification and abstraction, and at the end of his "blue" period, little more than the street lights and their reflections in the waters can be discerned from the mass of blue of the canvas. During this time, he was heavily influenced by Edward Munch, James McNeill Whistler, and Vincent van Gogh, who was promoted by Swedish artist Nils Kreuger. His art reflected recent industrial and technological developments and their impact on the urban environment around him in Stockholm.

In 1898, upon the recommendation of Nördstrom, Ernest Thiel, a wealthy banker, visited Jansson's studio and bought three paintings. Thiel purchased many more of Jansson's paintings and became the owner of the largest single collection of Jansson's work, on display at the Thielska Galleriet which was built on his estate and donated to the city of Stockholm. Thiel's patronage improved Jansson's economic standing, and many other collectors began to purchase Jansson's cittyscapes.

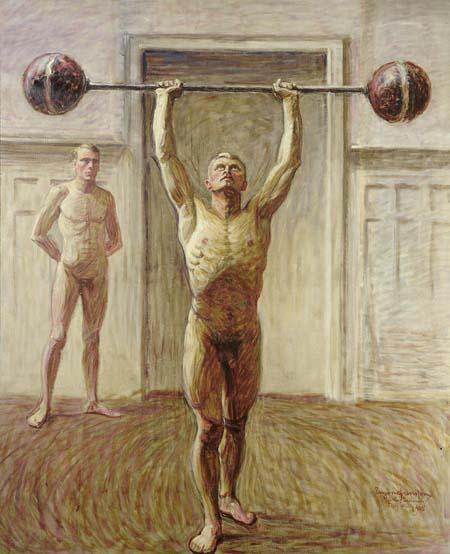
Pushing Weights with Two Arms, II, 1913–14 (in a private collection)

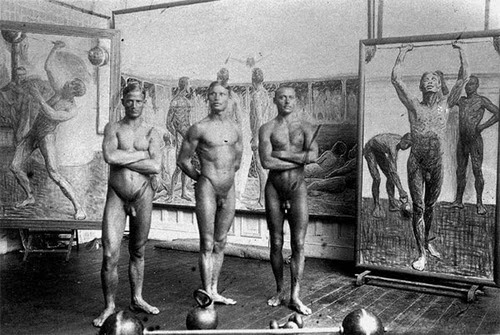
Eugène Jansson with models

After 1904, when he had already achieved success with his Stockholm views, Jansson confessed to a friend that he felt absolutely exhausted and had no more wish to continue with what he had done until then. He stopped participating in exhibitions for several years and went over to figure painting around 1907. To combat the health issues he had suffered from since childhood, he became a diligent swimmer and winter bather, often visiting the navy bathhouse (Flottans badhus), where he found the new subjects for his paintings. He painted groups of sunbathing sailors, and young muscular nude men lifting weights or doing other physical exercises. He painted Naken yngling (Naked Young Man ) in 1907 of his close companion Knut Hyman, a friend he had met at the naval bathhouse, and the two men shared a home in Jansson's studio until around 1912. He died in Nacka.

Art historians and critics have long avoided the issue of any possible homoerotic tendencies in this later phase of his art, but later studies (see Brummer 1999) have established that Jansson was in all probability homosexual and appears to have had a relationship with at least one of his models. His brother, Adrian Jansson, who was himself homosexual and survived Eugène by many years, burnt all his letters and many other papers, possibly to avoid scandal (homosexuality was illegal in Sweden until 1944). Eugène died of a cerebral hemorrhage in 1915.

== Gallery ==
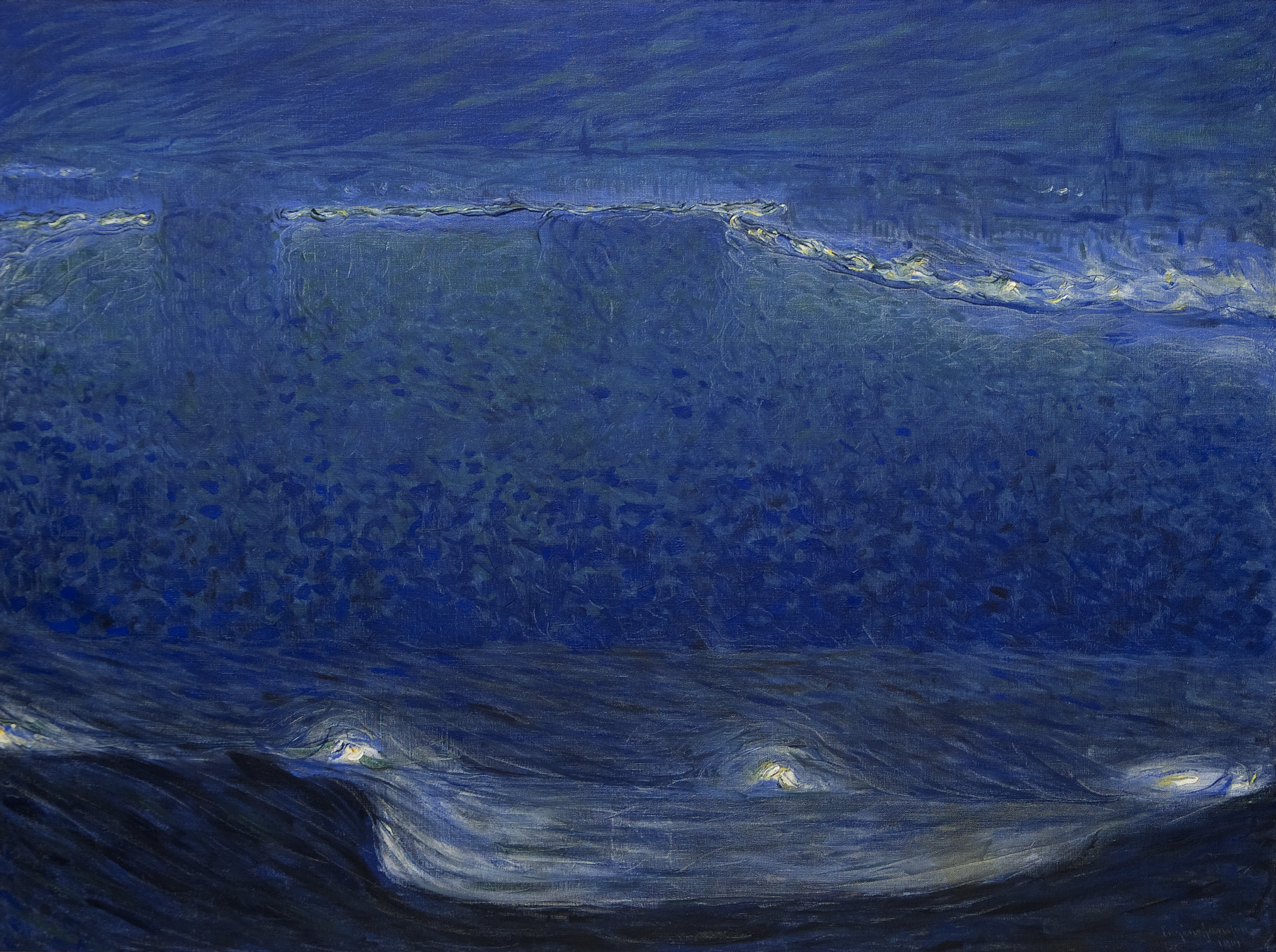
Nocturne (1901)

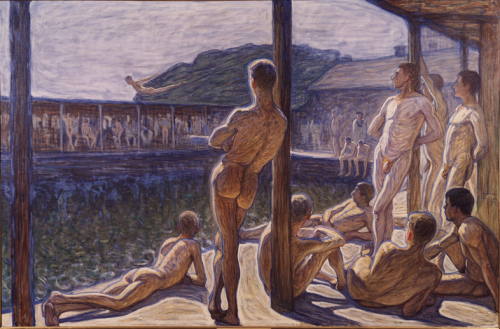
Naval Bathhouse (1907)

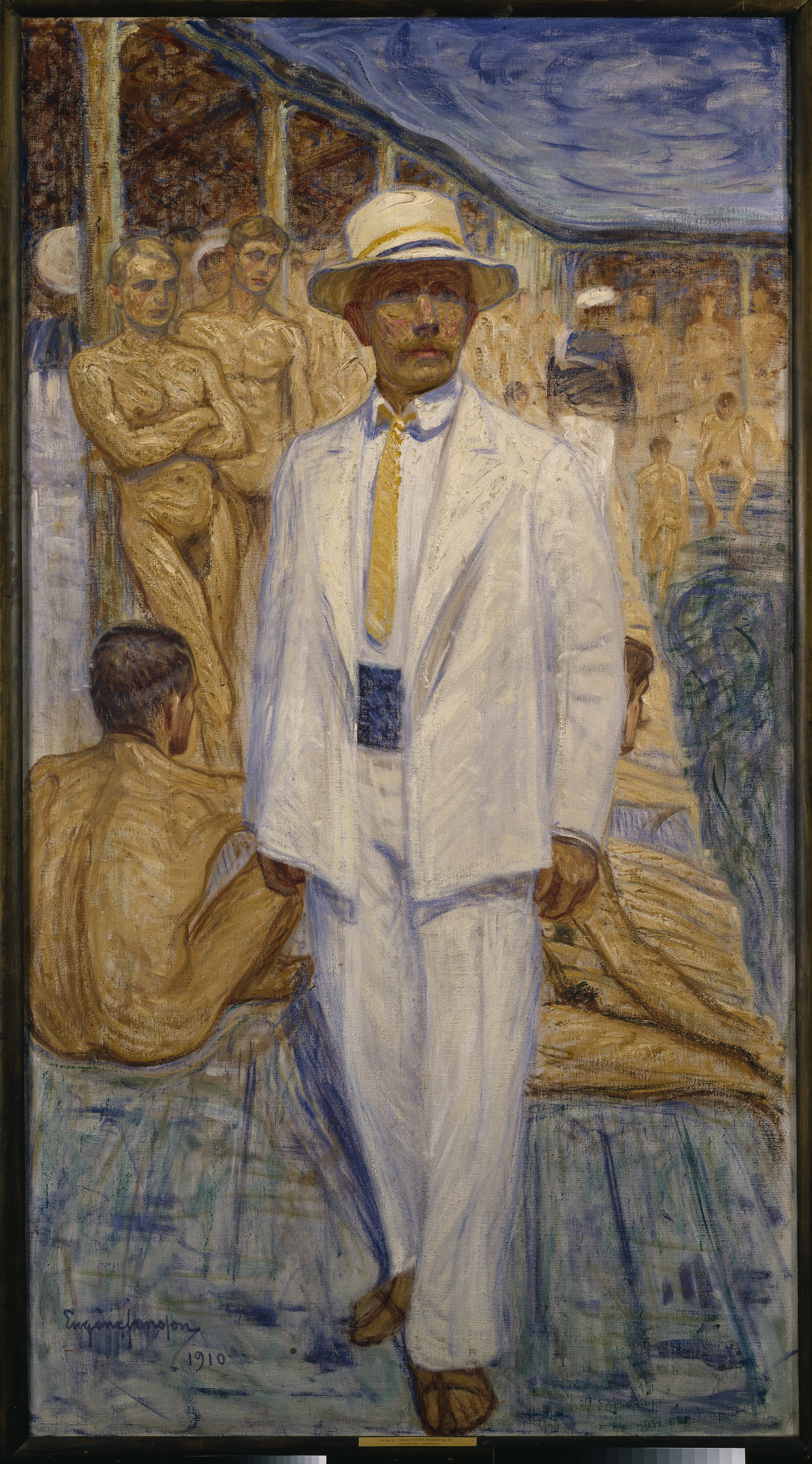
Self Portrait (1910)

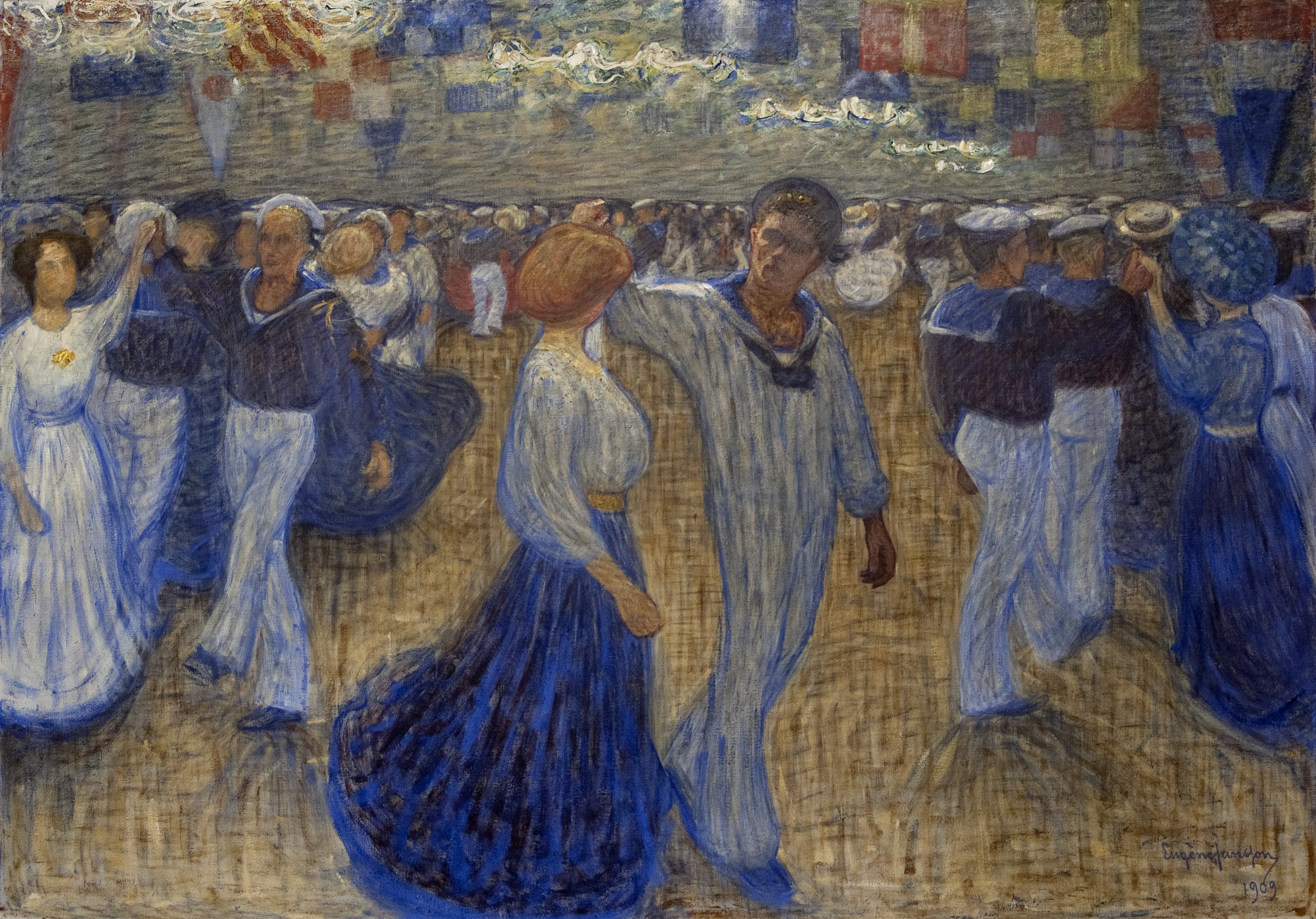
Le Bal des marins (1912)

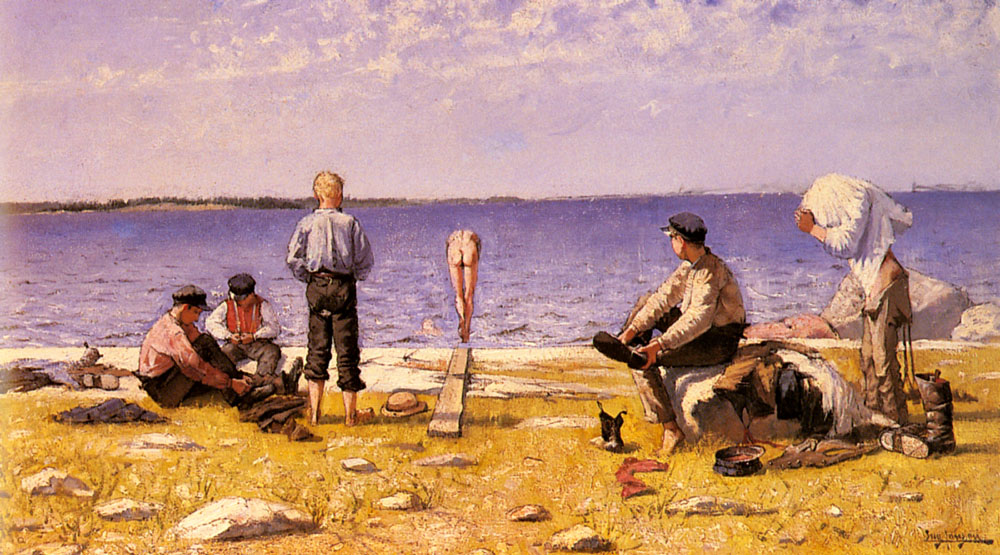
Boys on the beach (1884)

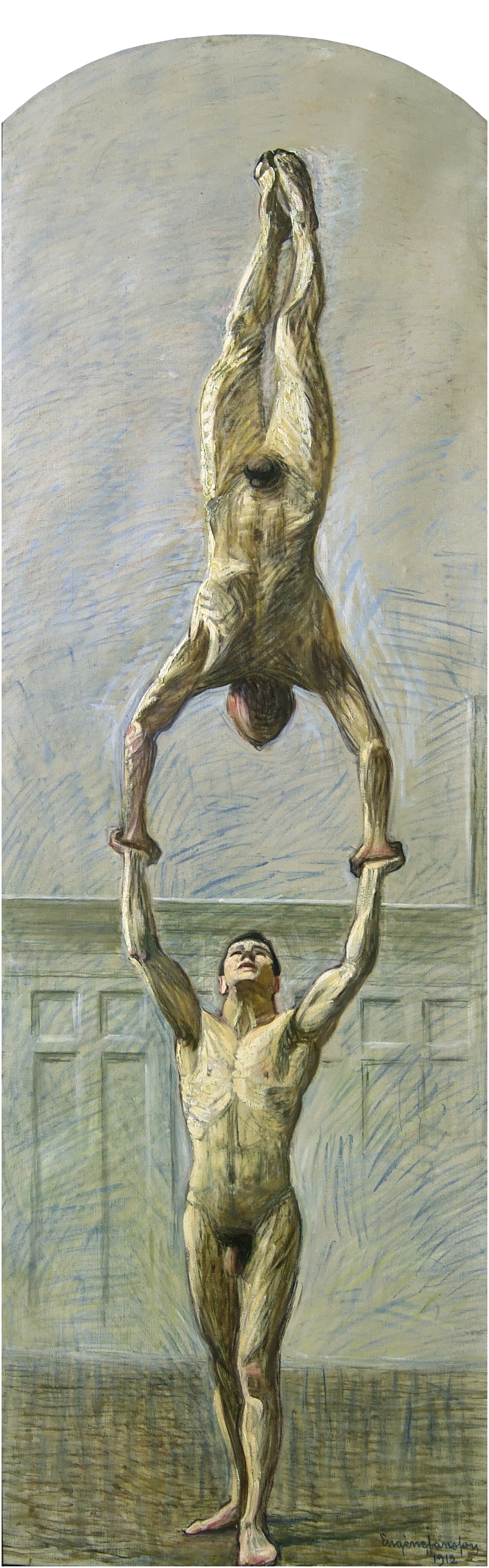
Acrobats (1912)

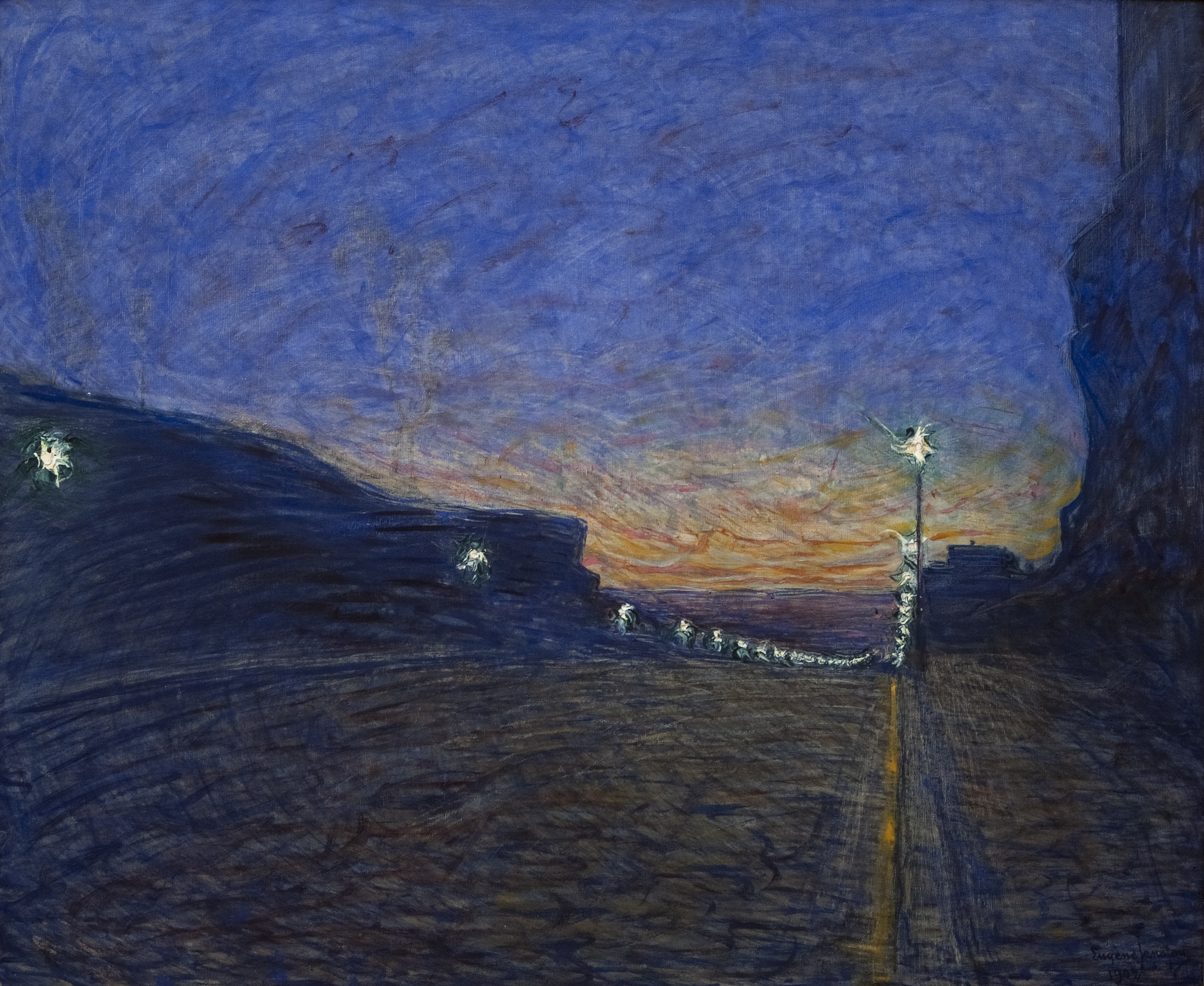
Hornsgatan (1902)

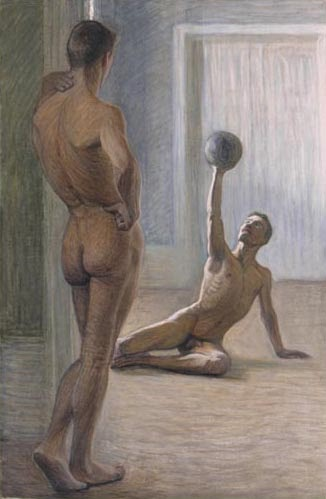
Athletes (1907)

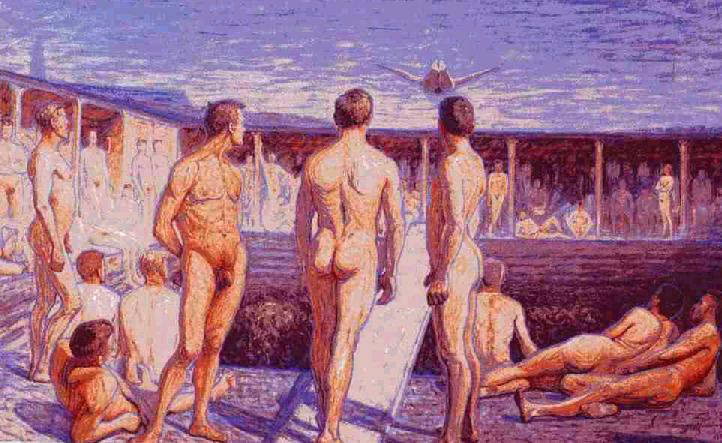
Bathing scene (1908)

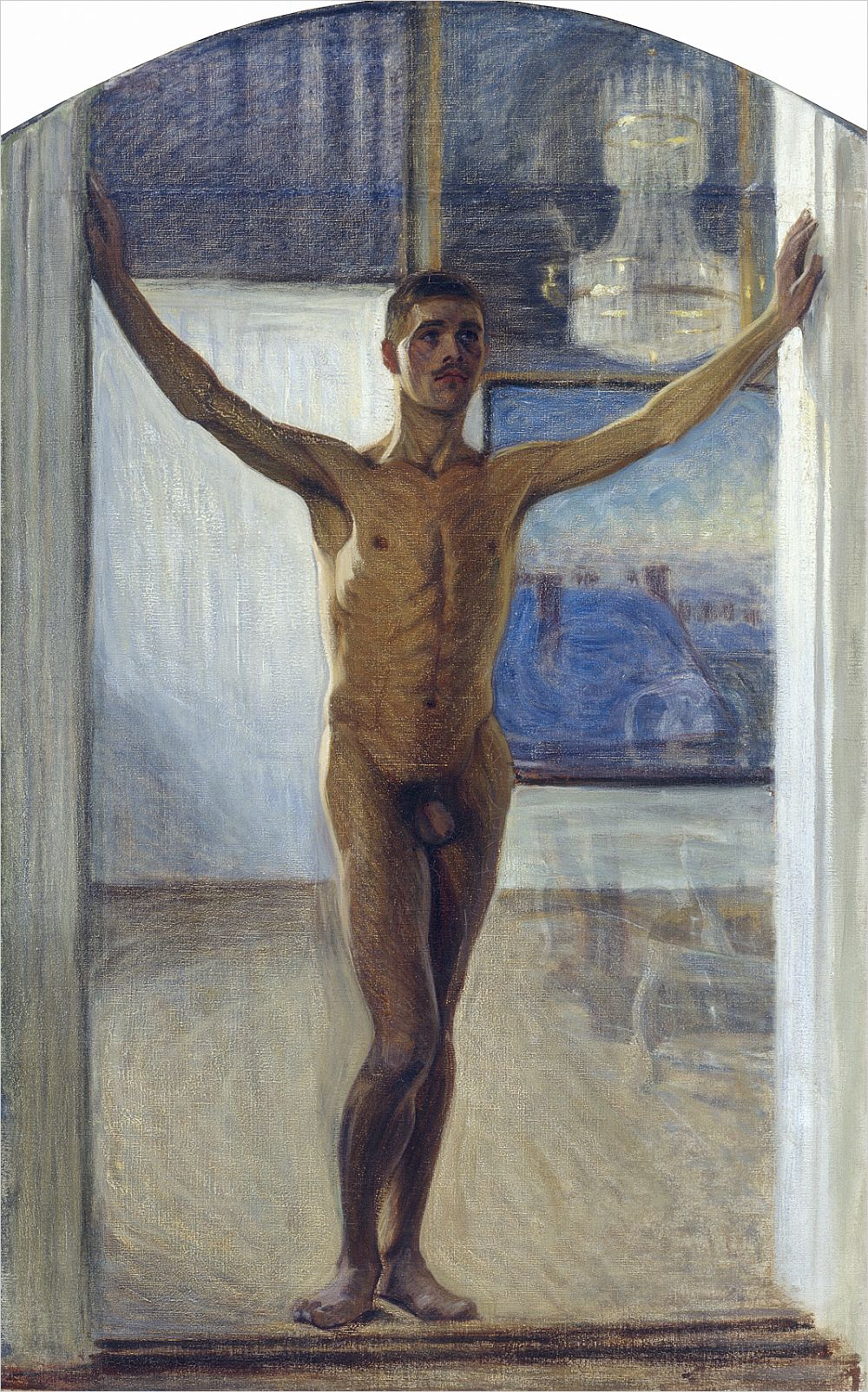
Nude youth (1907)

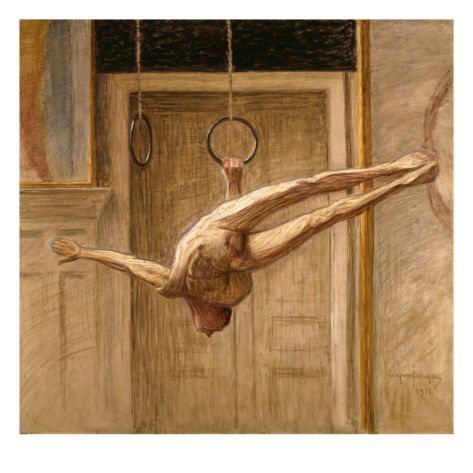
Les Anneaux (1912)

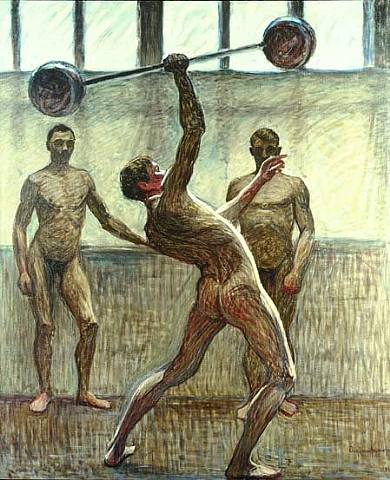
Lifting Weights with One Arm (1914)
