= Richard Bergh =

Swedish painter, art critic and museum manager

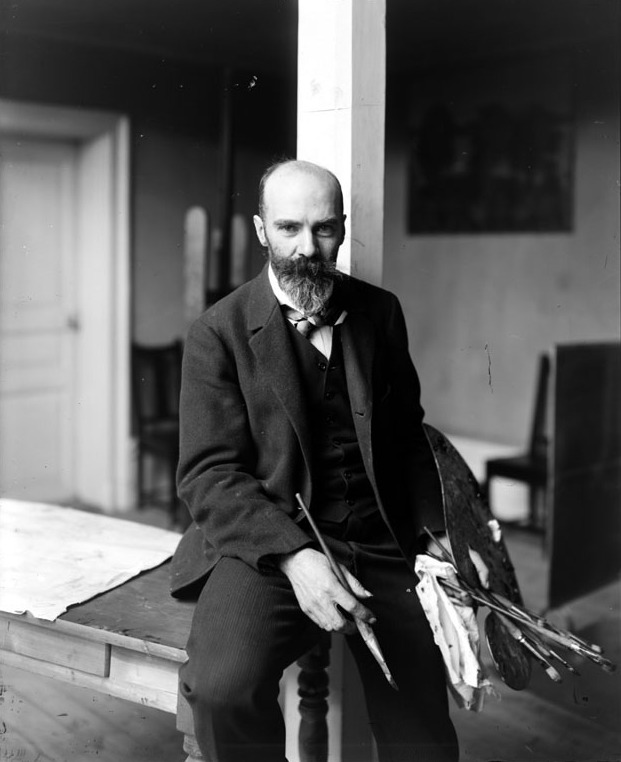
- Richard Bergh, photograph from 1904.
- Born: Sven Richard Bergh; 28 December 1858; Stockholm, Sweden
- Died: 29 January 1919 (aged 60); Stockholm, Sweden
- Education: Royal Swedish Academy of Arts, Stockholm
- Known for: Portrait painter, landscape painter

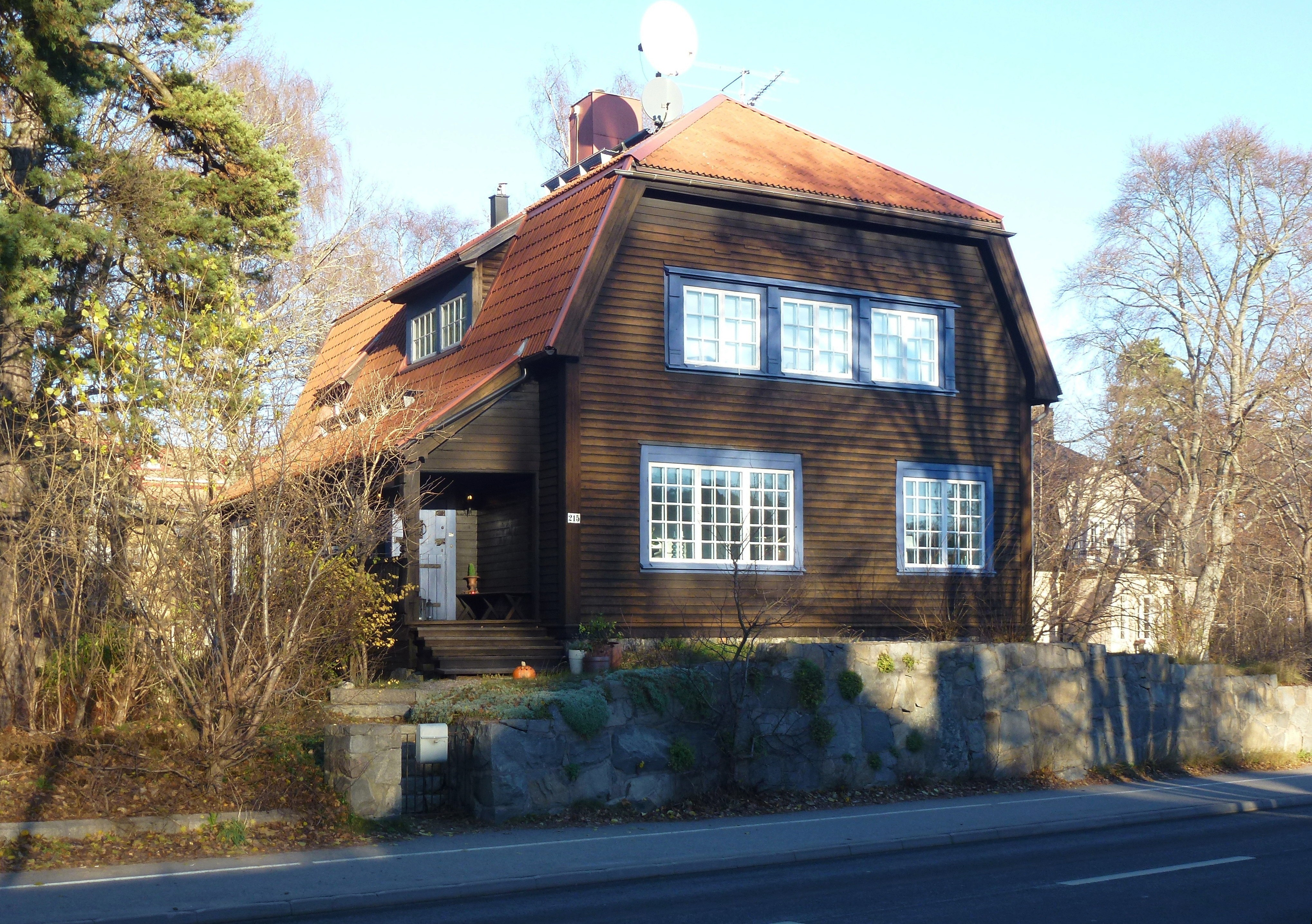
Villa Bergh in Värmdövägen

Sven Richard Bergh (28 December 1858 – 29 January 1919) was a Swedish painter, art critic and museum manager. Despite many years in France, he remained unattracted to Impressionism, preferring instead the Naturalism of painters such as Jules Bastien-Lepage. He also rejected the idea of creating landscapes en plein aire. Bergh is also notable for coining the term stämningsmåleri or "mood painting", in an 1896 essay about breaking with realism and embracing a new subjective style of painting towards the fin de siècle.

== Biography ==
Both of his parents, Johan Edvard Bergh and Amanda Helander (1825–1888), were artists and, presumably, his first teachers. He began his formal studies with Edvard Perséus, at his private school then, from 1878 to 1881, at the Royal Swedish Academy of Fine Arts. His first works were scenes from Swedish history, painted in the Academic style. In 1881, he went to Paris, where he took lessons from Jean-Paul Laurens at the Académie Colarossi. His first exhibition at the Salon came in 1883 and he completed his studies in 1884.

The following year, he and his friend, Ernst Josephson, became members of the Nordic art colony at Grez-sur-Loing. That same year, he joined with the Swedish artists who became known as the opponents (Opponenterna); a group that was protesting what they felt were the outmoded teaching methods at the Academy. Shortly after, they created the Artists' Association (Konstnärsförbundet) and Bergh became its secretary. In 1886, he married Helena Maria Klemming (1863–1889), the daughter of a bookseller. Their daughter, Amie, was born the same year. He had painted her portrait in 1885, and she would serve as his model on many occasions over the course of their short marriage.

Never in good health, Helena declined after Amie's birth and he became interested in attending séances. When she felt death approaching, they returned to Stockholm, at her request, and she died there from what is simply described as an "incurable disease". Not long after, he caught pneumonia and came close to death himself. During a long convalescence, one of those who cared for him was Gerda Winkrans (1864–1919), whose father was a local rector. He married her in 1890.

In 1893, Bergh and his family moved to Varberg, where he had plans to establish an artists' colony. Together with Nils Kreuger and Karl Nordström, old friends of his from the Academy, a new style of landscape painting was created which became known as the Varberg School (Varbergsskolan). He also found himself more attracted to Romantic Nationalism; a predilection that was strengthened by a stay in Italy from 1897 to 1898, where the art he observed impressed him as representing exactly the opposite. The painter Hedvig Hamilton studied with him in Stockholm.

In 1904, he decided to settle in Storängen, Nacka Municipality (now part of Stockholm). He engaged the architect Albin Brag to design his home, now known as the Villa Bergh at Värmdövägen. He and Gerda would live there until their deaths. Despite this apparent retirement, in 1915 he accepted an appointment as curator (Överintendent) and director of the Nationalmuseum; spending his last years on a modernization project that featured new purchasing guidelines. During those years, he also wrote numerous essays on art and an account of his participation with the Opponenterna.

His works may be seen at the Gothenburg Museum of Art, Nationalmuseum, Nordic Museum, Uppsala University Library, Thiel Gallery, Malmö Art Museum, Livrustkammaren and Prins Eugens Waldemarsudde.

Richard Berghs väg, a street in Södra Ängby, Stockholm, was named after him.

== Selected paintings ==
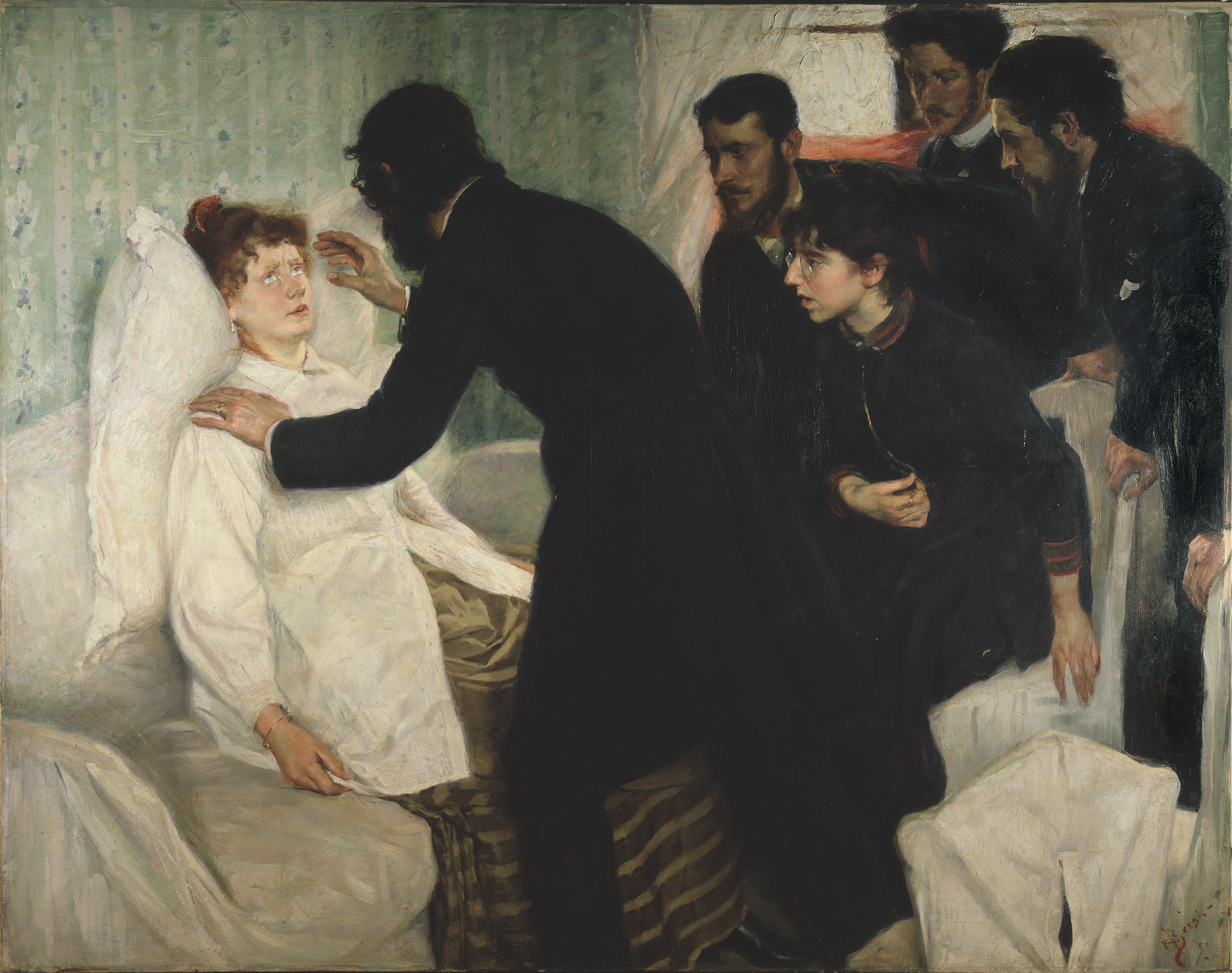
Hypnotic Seance (1887)

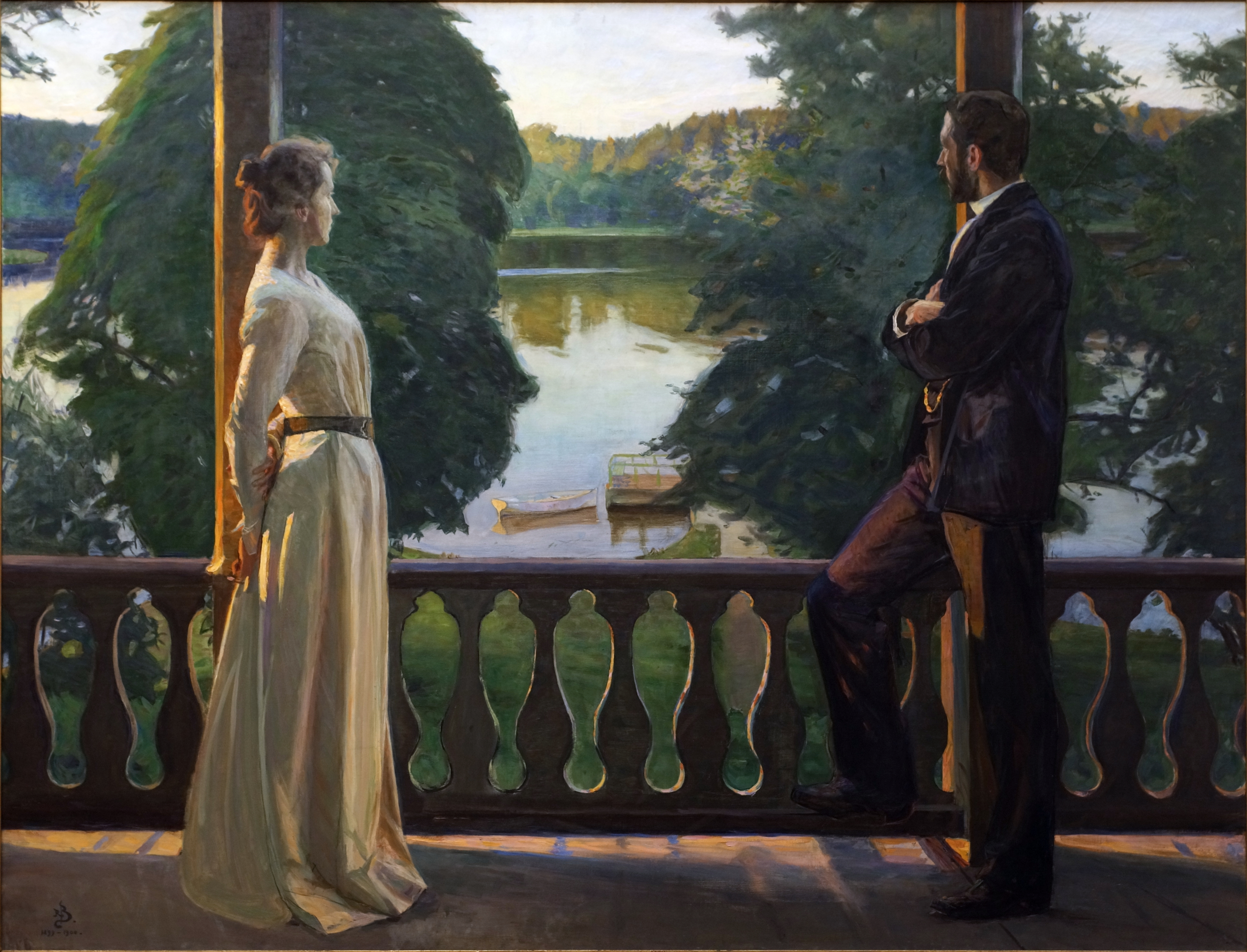
Nordic Summer Evening (1899–1900).

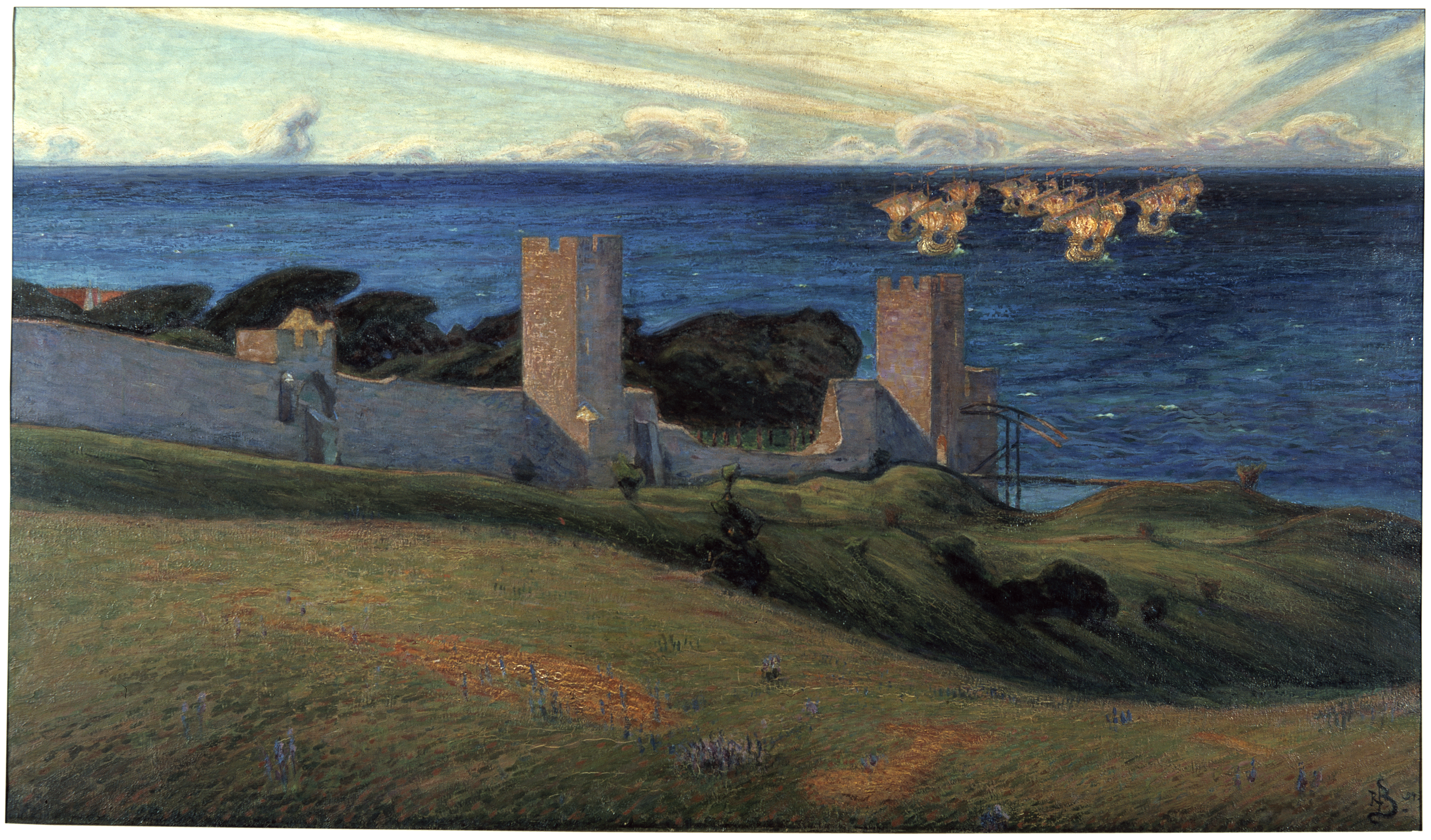
Vision: Scene from Visby (1894)

The Knight and the Maiden (1897) Thiel Gallery

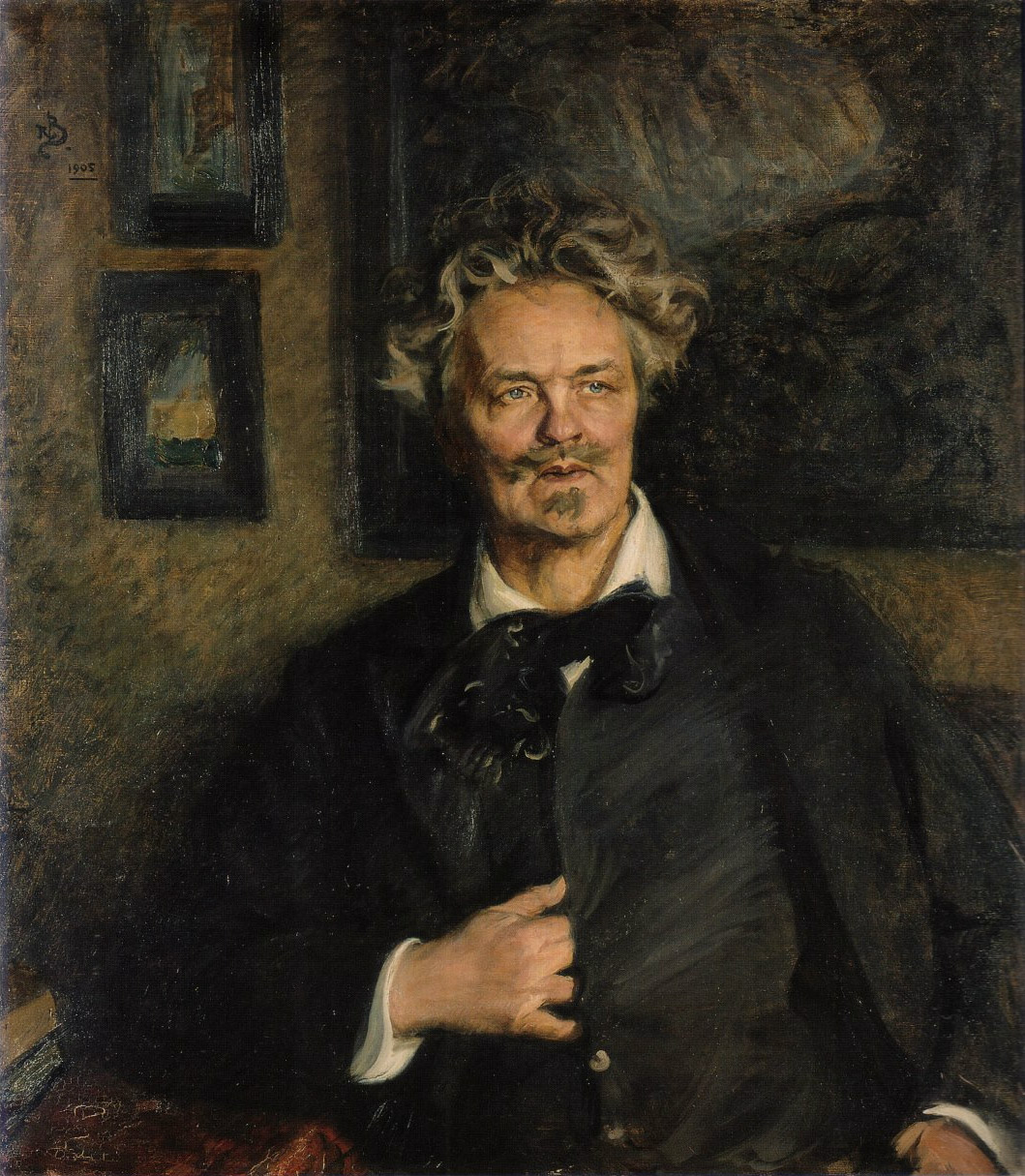
August Strindberg (1905)

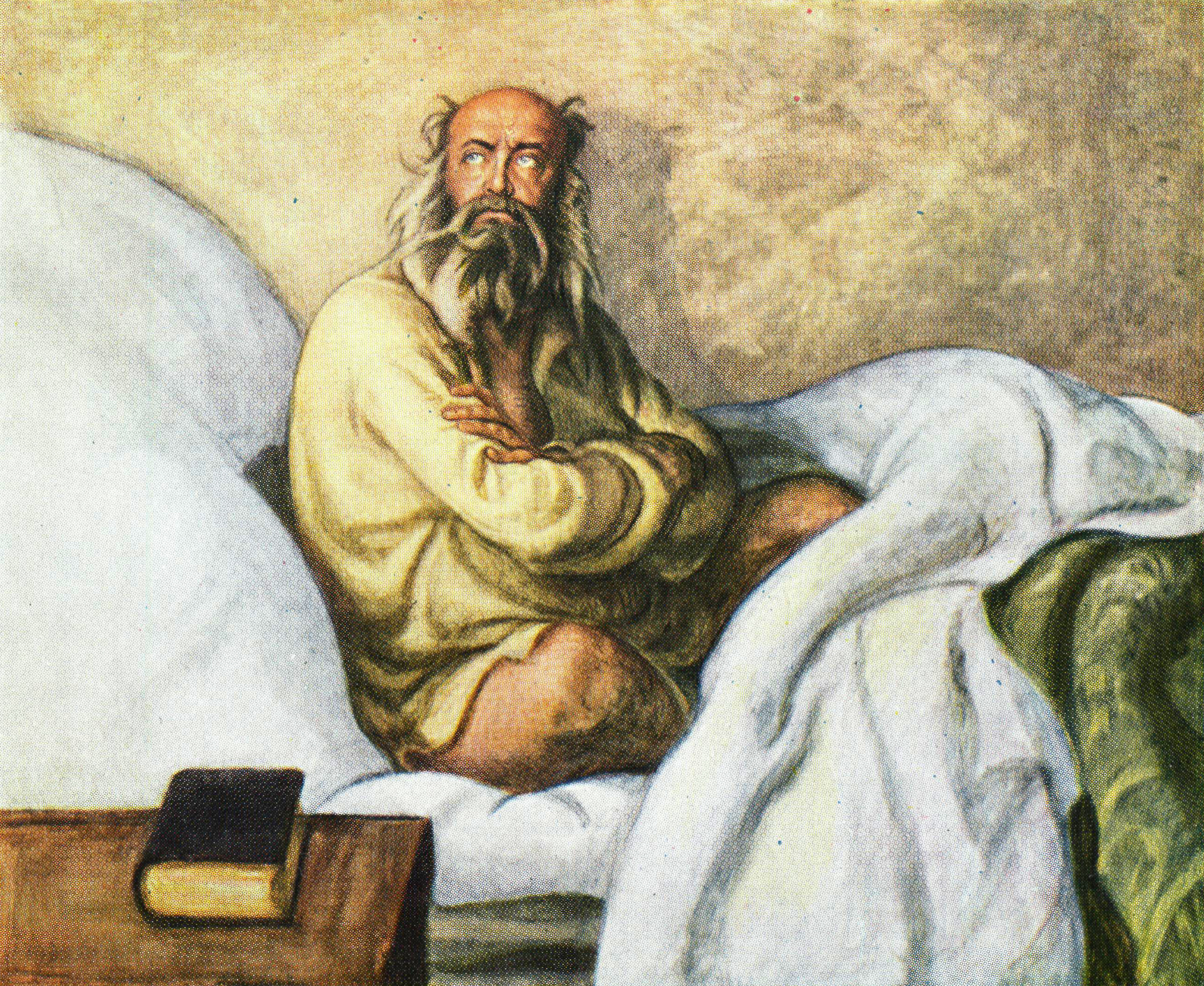
Gustaf Fröding (1909)

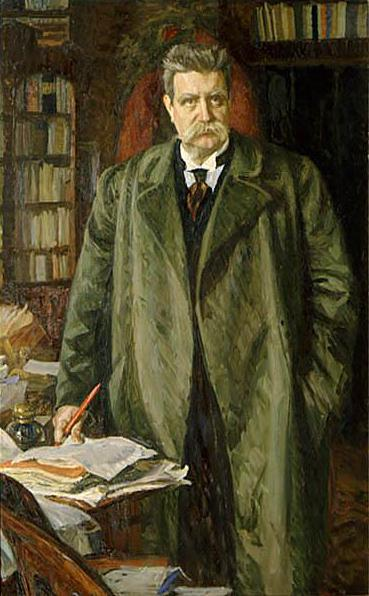
Hjalmar Branting
