= Julia Beck =

Swedish painter and calligrapher (1853–1935)

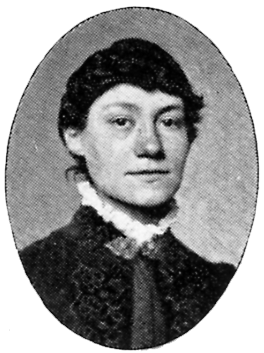
- Julia Beck, from the Svenskt Porträttgalleri
- Born: 20 December 1853; Stockholm, Sweden
- Died: 21 September 1935 (aged 81); Vaucresson, France
- Education: Royal Swedish Academy of Fine Arts; Académie Julian; Konstfack
- Occupations: Painter and calligrapher

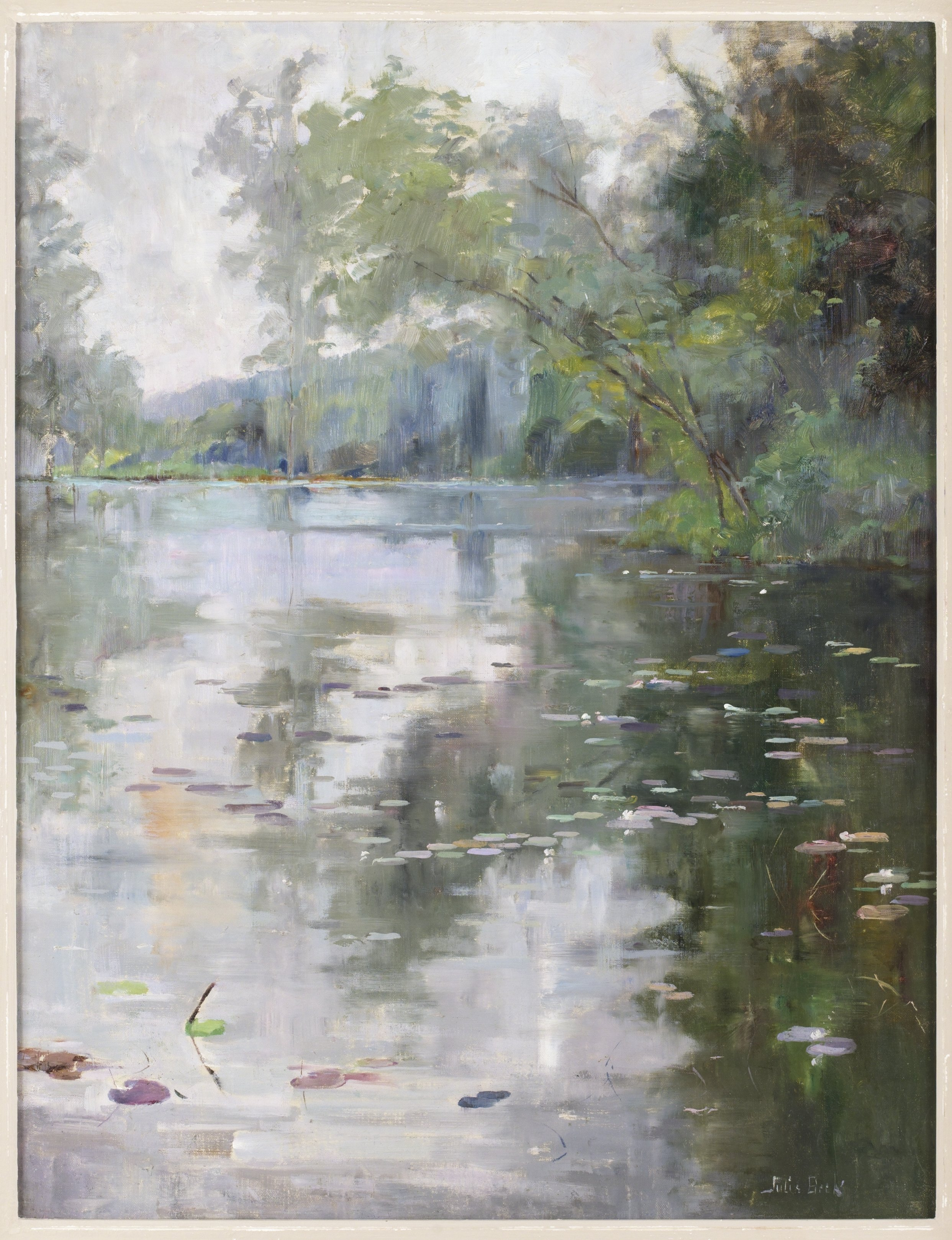
Julia Beck, Nénuphars (Näckrosor), oil on canvas, ca. 1887–88.

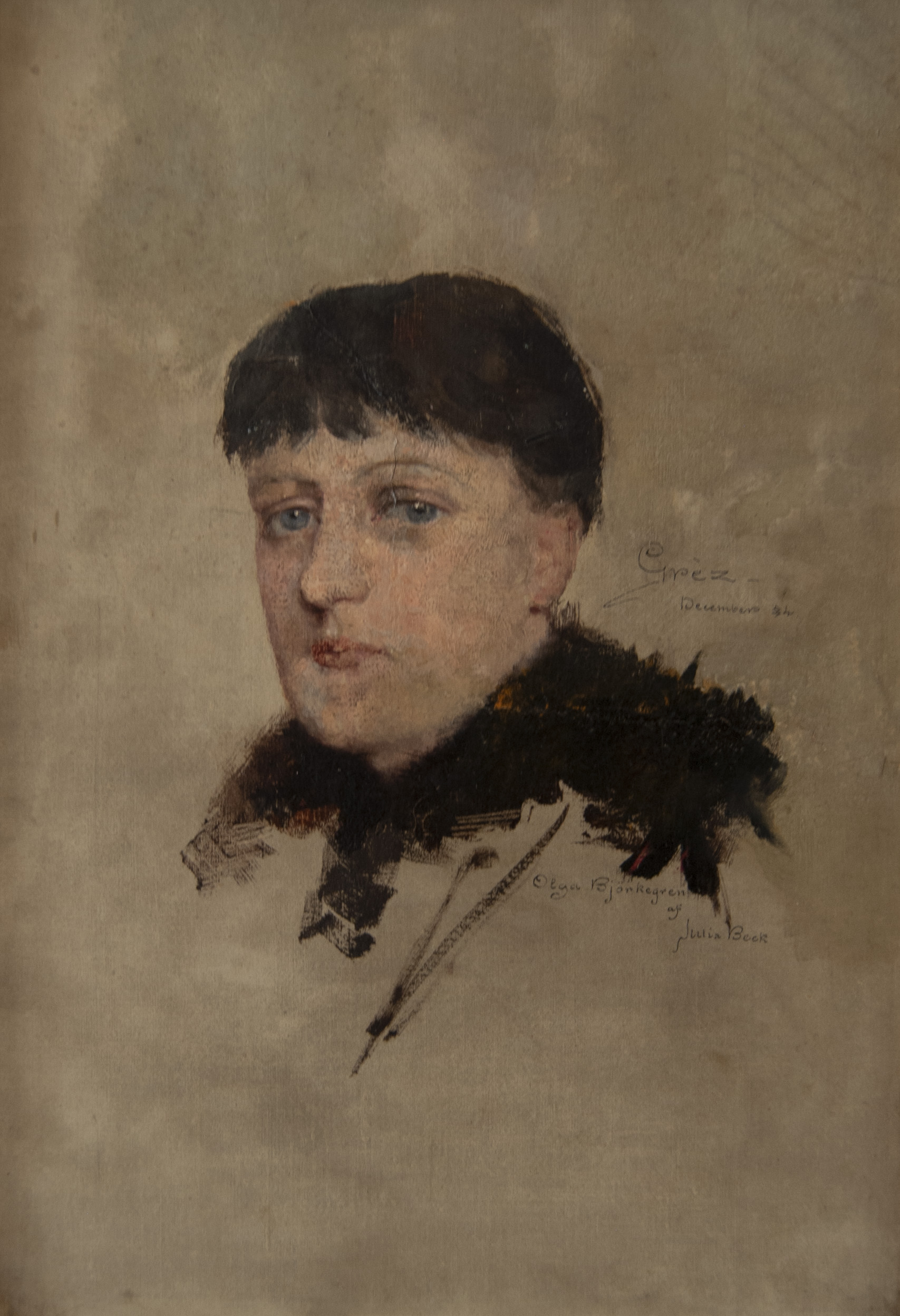
Portrait of Olga Björkegren done by Julia Beck at Grez-sur-Loing in 1884.Oil on canvas.

Julia Beck (20 December 1853 – 21 September 1935) was a Swedish painter and calligrapher.

== Biography ==
Beck was born in Stockholm, Sweden, the daughter of Franz Beck, a bookbinder. She was first educated at the sloyd school (later Konstfack) in Stockholm from 1869 to 1872. She then studied at the Royal Swedish Academy of Fine Arts (1872–1878) and later at the Académie Julian in Paris (1883–1884), where her teachers included Léon Bonnat and Jean-Léon Gérôme. Afterwards, she settled in France, where she was to spend most of the rest of her life. For a time she rented a studio in Paris with Harriet Backer, Hildegard Thorell, and Anna Munthe-Norstedt, and she also spent time at the Grez-sur-Loing art colony. In 1886, she became a member of Nya Idun, a Swedish women's association.

As a professional artist, she specialized in portraits for financial reasons, and she was one of the few Swedish women artists of her generation able to support herself through her art. However, her preferred genre was landscape, and she became known for atmospheric Impressionist landscapes painted in a somewhat muted palette.

In 1934, she was awarded the French Legion of Honour.

She died in Vaucresson, France. Her work is in the collection of museums including the Swedish National Museum. A retrospective of her work was mounted in 2012–2013 by the Zorn Museum in Mora, Sweden, and traveled to Sven-Harry's Art Museum in Stockholm.
