= Karl Nordström =

Swedish painter (1855–1923)

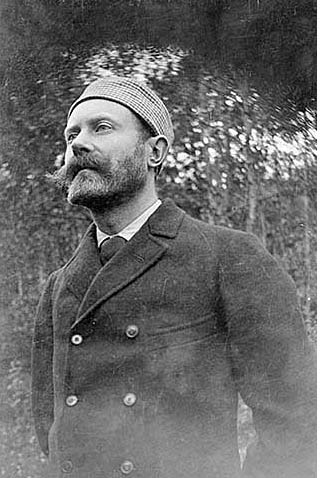
- Nordström c.1890
- Born: July 11, 1855
- Died: August 16, 1923 (aged 68); Drottningholm, Sweden
- Resting place: Norra begravningsplatsen, Stockholm, Sweden
- Occupation: Landscape painter

Karl Fredrik Nordström (11 July 1855 – 16 August 1923) was a Swedish painter who specialized in landscapes. From 1896 to 1920, he was chairman of the Association of Artists (Konstnärsförbundet).

== Biography ==
His father was a police commissioner. He grew up in Stenkyrka Parish on the island of Tjörn until he was twenty, when he went to Stockholm to study at the Royal Swedish Academy of Fine Arts, where his primary instructor was Edvard Perséus (1841–1890). From 1880 to 1882, he studied on his own in France, visited museums in Antwerp and Brussels and became influenced by Impressionism after seeing their Seventh Exhibition at Paris during 1882. He was able to get two paintings displayed at the Salon. Then, after a stay in Normandy, he returned home and remained there until 1886. In 1885, he was one of a group of 85 Swedish artists who became known as the opponents (Opponenterna). They were signatories of a written request to the Royal Academy of Arts for a modernization and reform of the art education, exhibition activities and artist support.

In 1885, he married the engraver, Tekla Lindeström (1856–1937) whom he had met at the Swedish artists' colony in Grez-sur-Loing in north-central France. Their daughter, Elsa Nordström (1889–1952) also became a painter.

In 1889, he exhibited at the Exposition Universelle and one of his paintings was purchased by Prince Eugen (1865–1947), a notable patron of the arts. Later, they went back to Tjörn, then lived in Skansen until 1892. After that, they once more returned to Tjörn and spent the summers at the resort town of Apelviken, south of Varberg. There, together with Nils Kreuger (1858–1930) and Richard Bergh (1858–1919), they developed an art style what came to be known as the Varberg School (Varbergsskolan).

He was also one of the founders of the Konstnärsförbundet and served as chairman from 1896 to 1920. In the early 1900s, he was a teacher at their school, the Association of Artists School (Konstnärsförbundets målarskola) which was in operation from 1890–1908. After 1910, he began to switch from Impressionism to Synthetism, possibly influenced by Van Gogh and Gauguin, whose works he had seen in Paris, as well as by the Japanese art he saw there.

In 1913, he began to have health problems, beginning with gallbladder surgery. In 1914, he started a diary. The following years were not happy. In quick succession he lost his mother (aged almost one hundred) and his best friend, Bergh. In 1920, after the Konstnärsförbundet was dissolved, he and his wife paid a nostalgic visit to France. He died at Drottningholm during 1923 and was buried at the Norra begravningsplatsen.

His works may be seen at the Nationalmuseum, Prins Eugens Waldemarsudde, Thiel Gallery, Göteborgs konstmuseum., and at the Isabella Stewart Gardner Museum in Boston, Massachusetts.

The street Karl Nordströms väg in Södra Ängby is named after him, as is the Karl Nordströms väg in Varberg.

== Selected paintings ==
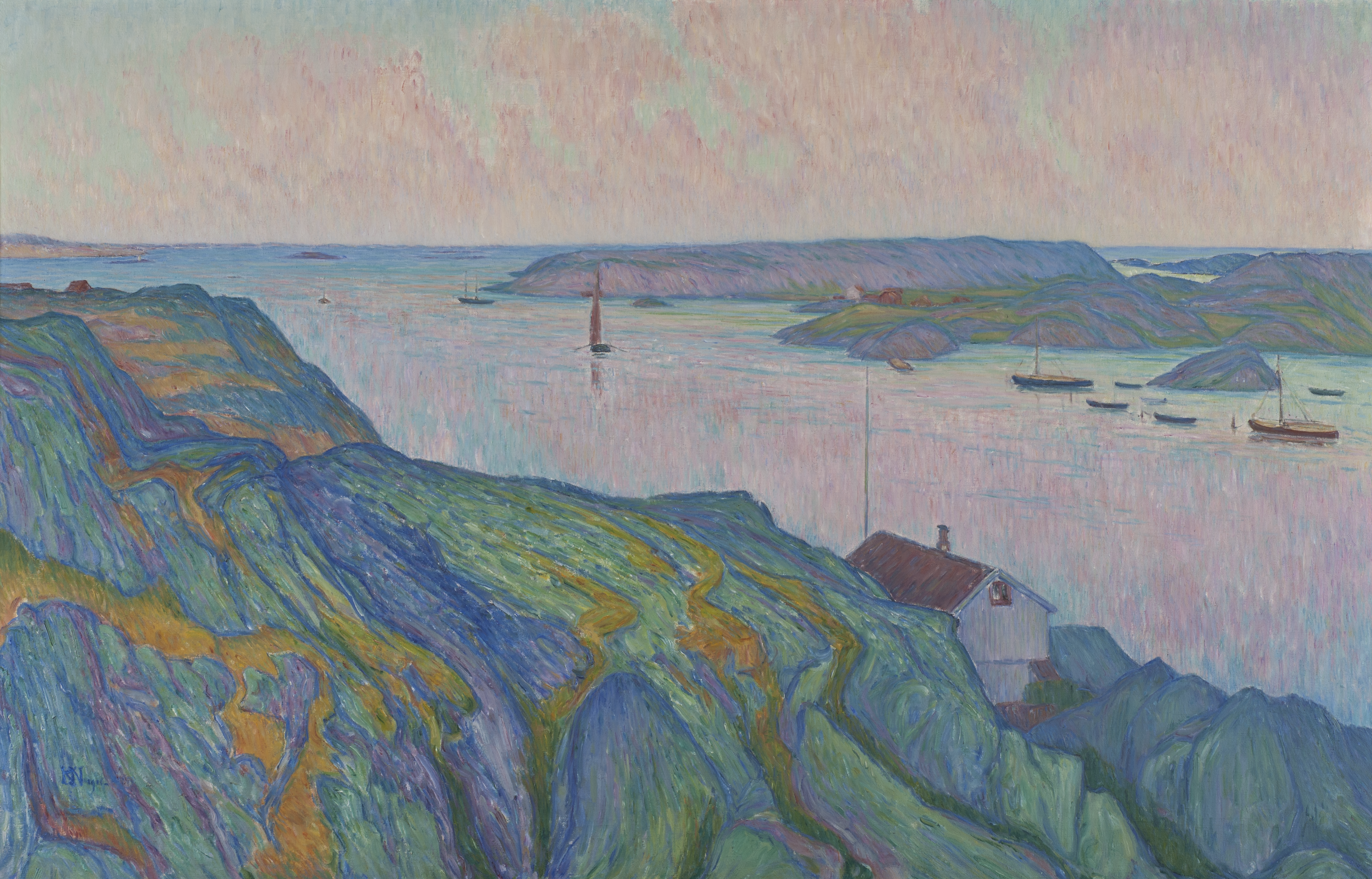
Kyrkesund, Tjörn

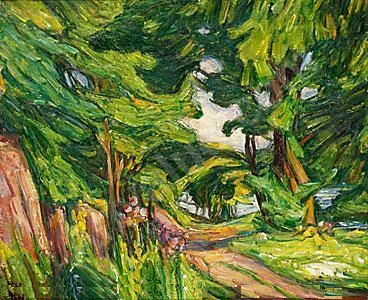
Redwoods

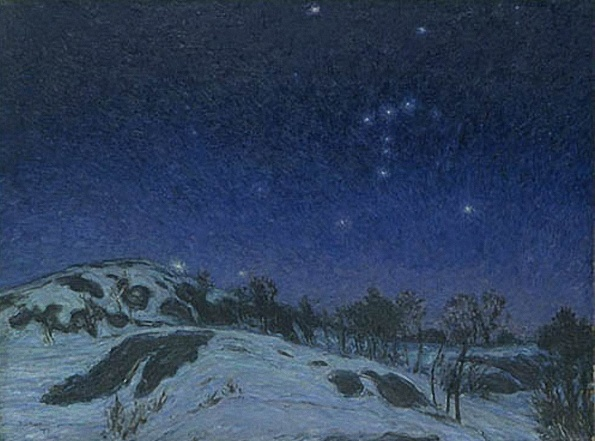
Winter Night

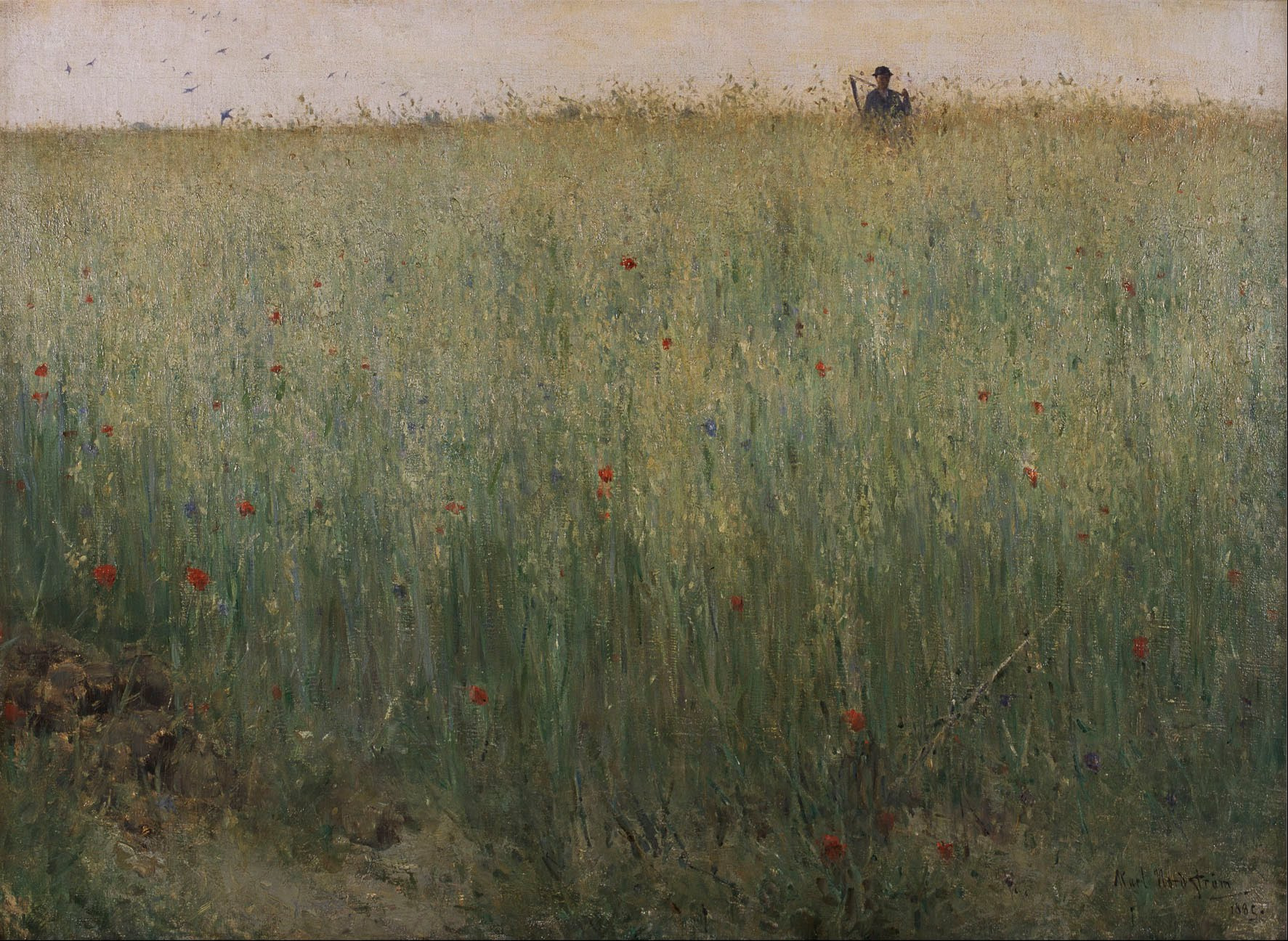
Oatfield at Grez-sur-Loing

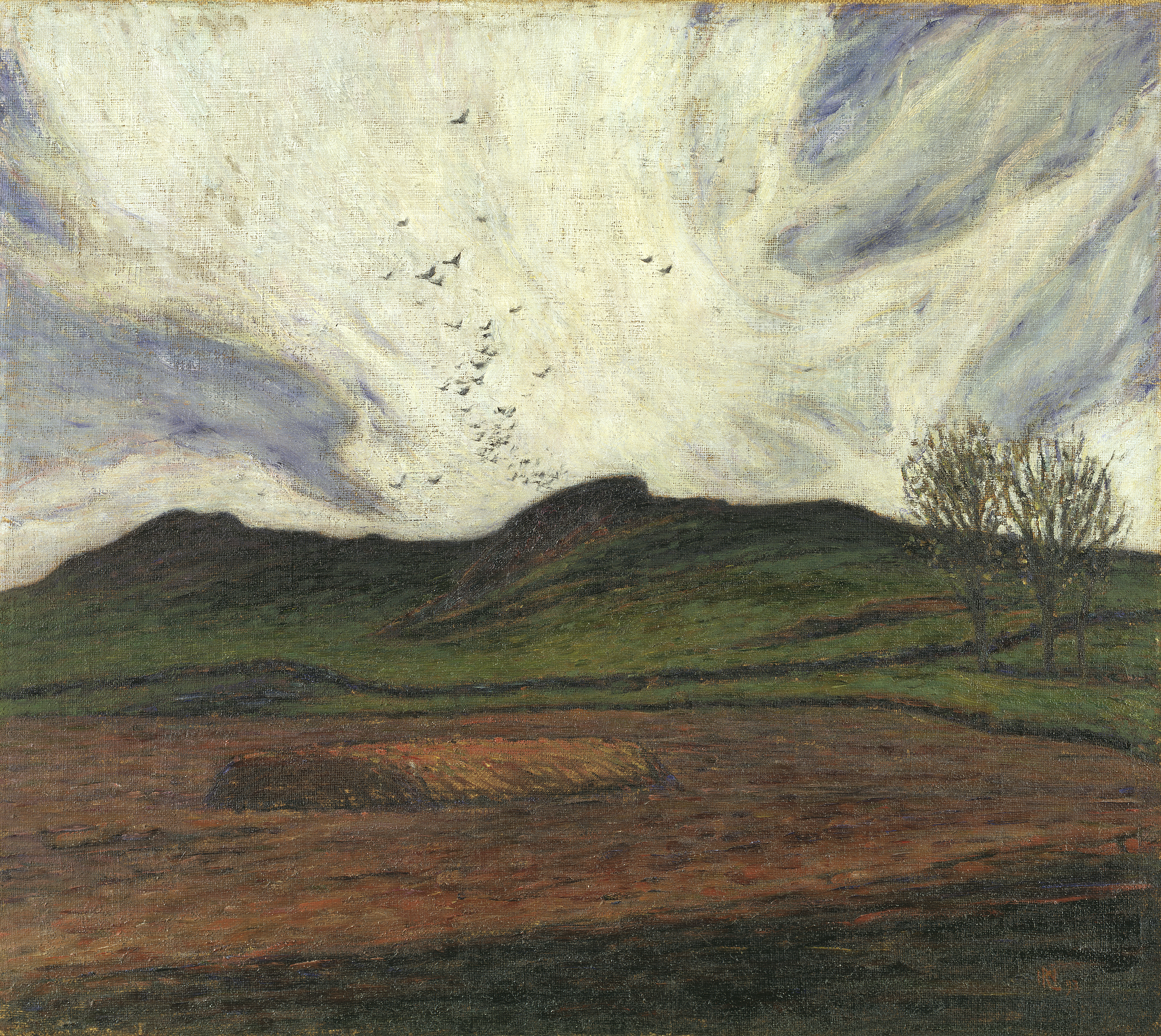
Storm Clouds
