= List of Sweden-related topics =

This is a list of topics related to Sweden.

Those interested in the subject can monitor changes to the pages by clicking on Related changes in the sidebar.

== Main articles ==
- Sweden, a country in Europe
- History of Sweden
- Politics of Sweden
- Geography of Sweden
- Agriculture in Sweden
- Counties of Sweden
- Economy of Sweden
- Demographics of Sweden
- Swedish language
- Culture of Sweden

== Lists of people ==
- List of Swedes
  - List of Swedes by net worth
- List of Swedish monarchs
- List of Swedish queens
- List of Swedish prime ministers
- List of Swedish actors
- List of Swedish architects
- List of Swedish artists
- List of Swedish clergymen
- List of Swedish diplomats
- List of Swedish entrepreneurs
- List of Swedish film directors
- List of Swedish military commanders
  - List of Swedish Field Marshals
- List of Swedes in music
- List of Swedish politicians
  - List of County Governors of Sweden
- List of Swedish scientists
- List of Swedes in sports
- List of Swedish language writers

== Administrative subdivisions ==
=== Lists ===
- List of Swedish counties
- List of municipalities of Sweden
  - List of municipalities of Sweden by area
  - List of municipalities of Sweden by density
  - List of municipalities of Sweden by population
  - List of municipalities of Sweden by wealth
- List of postal codes in Sweden

=== Articles ===
- Subdivisions of Sweden
- Counties of Sweden
- County Councils of Sweden
- Municipalities of Sweden
- Urban areas in Sweden

== Culture ==
=== Lists ===
- List of Swedish cultural institutions

=== Articles ===
- Culture of Sweden
- Music of Sweden
- Rap music in Sweden
- Swedish literature
- Cinema of Sweden
- Swedish cuisine
- Holidays in Sweden
  - Flag flying days in Sweden
  - Namesdays in Sweden
- National anthem of Sweden
- Swedish heraldry
  - Coat of Arms of Sweden
  - Flag of Sweden
- Registered partnership in Sweden
- Same-sex marriage in Sweden

== Demographics ==
=== Lists ===
- List of municipalities of Sweden by density
- List of municipalities of Sweden by population

=== Articles ===
- Demographics of Sweden
- Swedish people

== Economy, business and enterprise ==
=== Lists ===
- List of Swedish companies
- List of Swedish government enterprises
- List of municipalities of Sweden by wealth

=== Articles ===
- Company mortgage (Sweden)
- Economy of Sweden
  - Swedish welfare
  - Unemployment benefits in Sweden
- Swedish Krona
- Tourism in Sweden

== Education ==
=== Lists ===
- List of universities in Sweden

=== Articles ===
- Education in Sweden

== Genealogy, names and nobility ==
=== Lists ===
- List of Swedish noble families

=== Articles ===
- Swedish nobility
- Swedish heraldry

== Geography ==
=== Lists ===
- List of cities in Sweden
- List of rivers in Sweden
- List of islands of Sweden
- List of lakes in Sweden
- List of national parks of Sweden
- Forests of Sweden

=== Articles ===
- Geography of Sweden

== Government and politics ==
=== Lists ===
- List of political parties in Sweden
- List of Swedish governments
- Line of succession to the Swedish throne
- Swedish diplomatic missions
  - Sweden and the United Nations

=== Articles ===
- Politics of Sweden
  - Foreign relations of Sweden
  - Monetary policy of Sweden
  - Swedish welfare/Social security in Sweden
- Constitution of Sweden
- Monarch of Sweden
- Government of Sweden
- Prime Minister of Sweden
- Riksdag (the Parliament of Sweden)
- Elections in Sweden
- Referendums in Sweden
- Government agencies in Sweden
- Sveriges Riksbank

== Healthcare ==
=== Lists ===
- List of hospitals in Sweden

=== Articles ===
- Healthcare in Sweden
- Abortion in Sweden
- Disability policy in Sweden

== History ==
=== Lists ===
- List of Swedish wars
  - List of Swedish battles
- List of historic buildings in Sweden

=== Articles ===
- History of Sweden
- Lands of Sweden
- Provinces of Sweden
- Dominions of Sweden

== Language ==
=== Articles ===
- Swedish language
  - Standard Swedish
  - Finland-Swedish
  - Swedish alphabet
  - Swedish phonology
  - Swedish grammar
  - Mandatory Swedish
  - Rinkebysvenska
- Minority languages of Sweden

== Media ==
=== Lists ===
- List of Swedish newspapers
- List of Swedish magazines
- List of Swedish radio stations
- List of Swedish television channels

=== Articles ===
- Media in Sweden
- Communications in Sweden

== Military ==
=== Lists ===
- List of Swedish regiments
- List of Swedish ships of the line
- List of Swedish steam battleships
- List of military aircraft of Sweden

=== Articles ===
- Swedish Armed Forces

== Organizations and institutions ==
=== Lists ===
- Non-governmental organizations in Sweden
- SACC New York
- Swedish Royal Academies

== Religion ==
=== Articles ===
- Religion in Sweden
- Church of Sweden

== Sport ==
=== Lists ===
- List of football clubs in Sweden
- List of sport events in Sweden

=== Articles ===
- Sport in Sweden

== See also ==
- Swedish (disambiguation)
