= Swedish =

Swedish or svensk(a) may refer to:

Anything from or related to Sweden, a country in Northern Europe. Or, specifically:

- Swedish language, a North Germanic language spoken primarily in Sweden and Finland
  - Swedish alphabet, the official alphabet used by the Swedish language
- Swedish people or Swedes, persons with a Swedish ancestral or ethnic identity
  - A national or citizen of Sweden, see demographics of Sweden
  - Culture of Sweden
- Swedish cuisine

== See also ==
- Swedish Church (disambiguation)
- Swedish Institute (disambiguation)
- Swedish invasion (disambiguation)
- Swedish Open (disambiguation)
