= Sueca =

Sueca may refer to:

- Sueca (card game), a Portuguese trick-taking card game
- Sueca, Valencia, a city in eastern Spain
- "Sueca", the Portuguese, Spanish and Galician, Catalan and Valencian word for Swedish woman
- Sueca Ricers, an American football team in Sueca, Spain
- Sueca italiana
