= Ernest Thiel =

Swedish financier and art collector

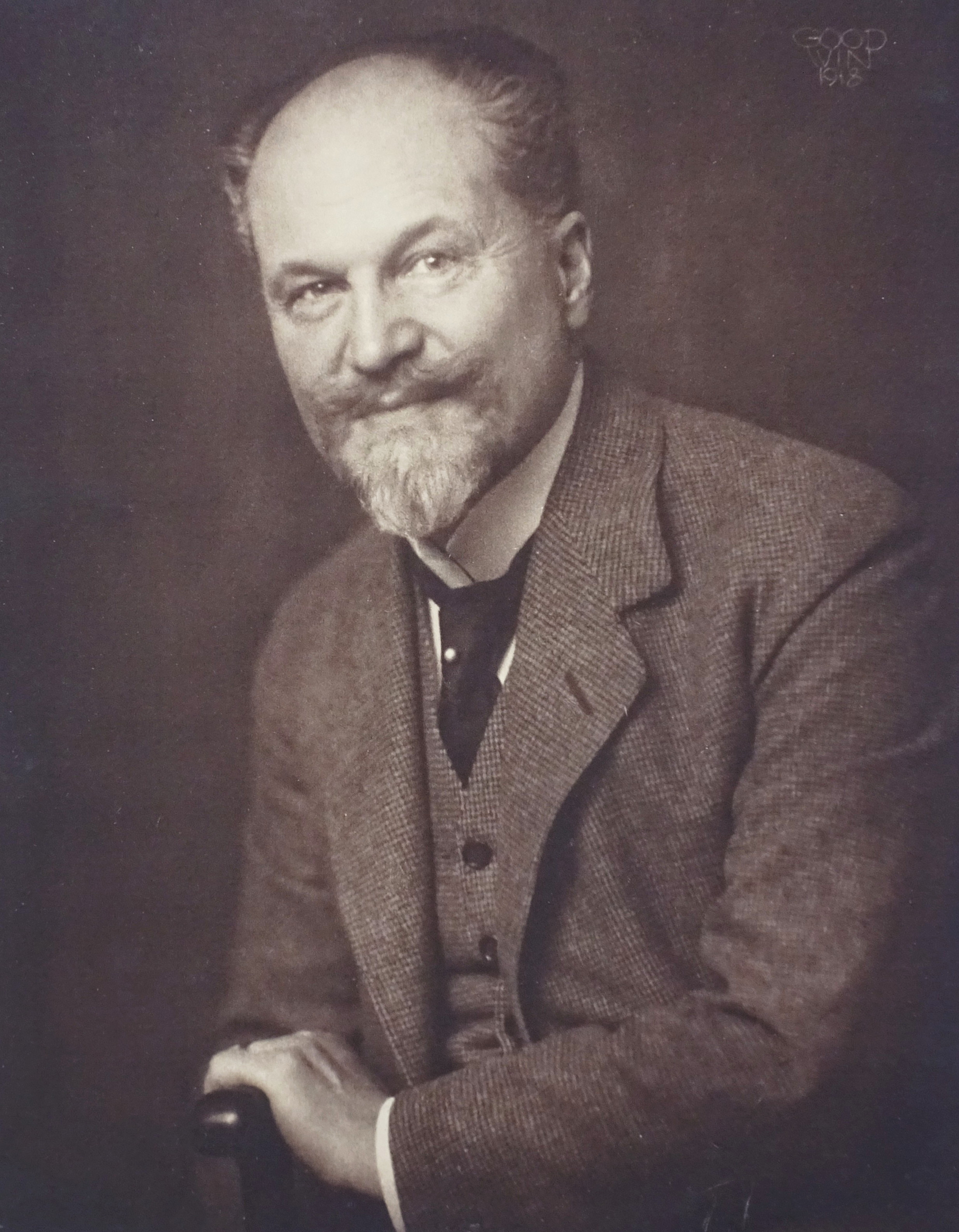
Ernest Thiel, 1918

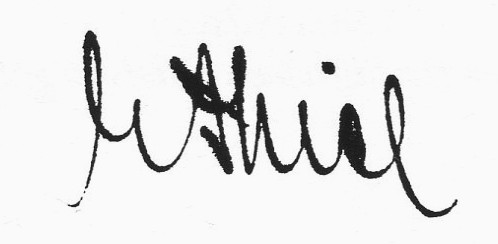
Ernest Thiel's signature

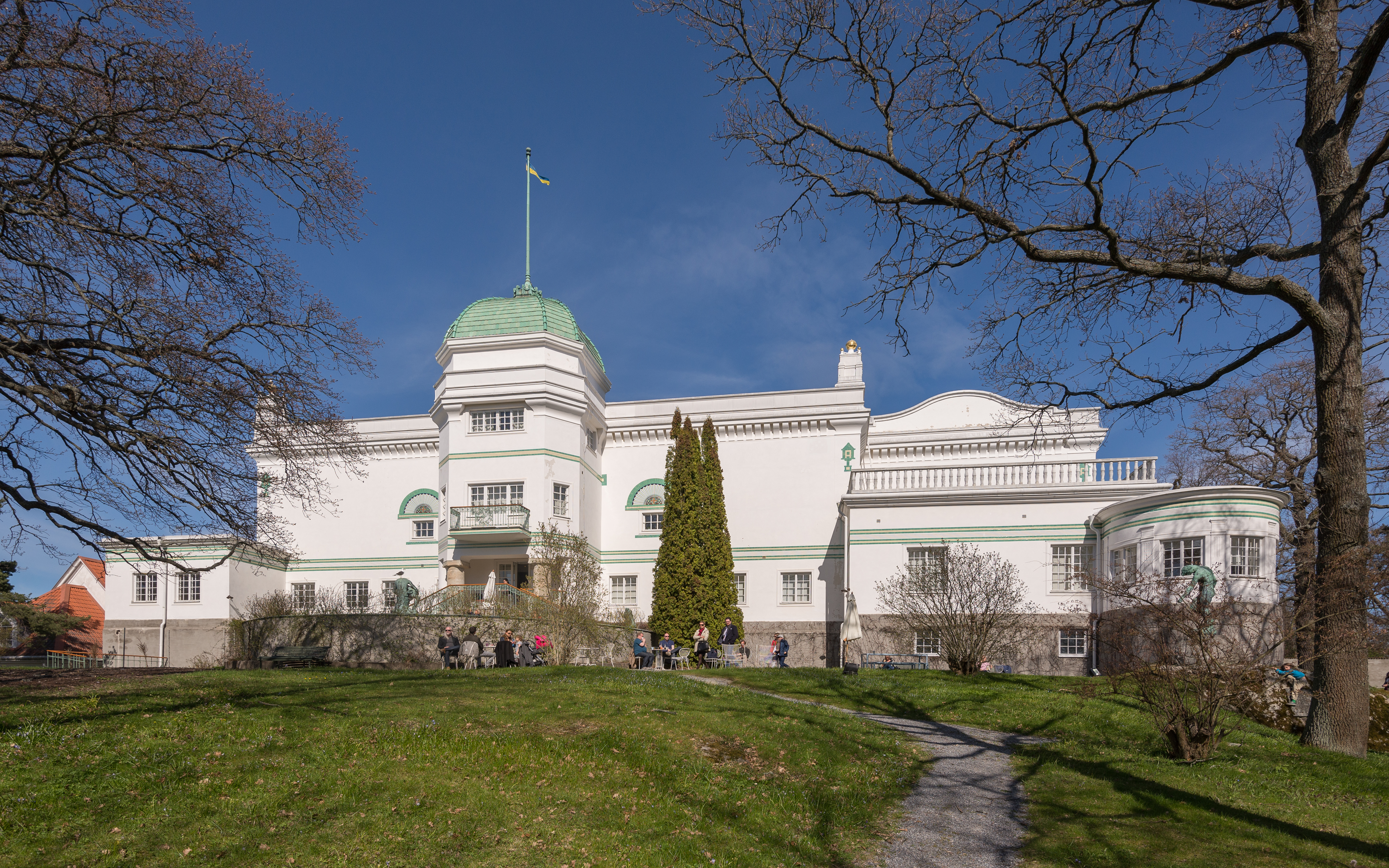
Thielska galleriet

Ernest Jacques Thiel (18 August 1859 – 6 January 1947) was a Swedish financier and art collector whose former villa in the Stockholm park area Djurgården today houses the Thiel Gallery (Swedish: Thielska galleriet).

== Biography ==
Ernest Thiel was born in the Swedish town of Norrköping. His parents were the Belgian Catholic engineer Jacques Thiel and Fanny Stiebel, of German-Jewish origin. After school in Stockholm, Thiel was sent to Germany to learn trade in a Hamburg merchant house, and later worked in a bank there. He returned to Stockholm in 1877 and found work in Stockholms Enskilda Bank, the bank of the Wallenberg family.

In 1884 he became the manager of the Stockholm office of Hernösands enskilda bank and in 1891 he had accumulated enough capital to start his own bank, Stockholms Kredit- och Diskontoförening, later known as Aktiebolaget Stockholms diskontobank, which he headed until 1901. In 1884 he had married Anna Josephson, member of a well-known Jewish family and sister-in-law of the publisher Karl Otto Bonnier.

He caused a scandal when he divorced her (1896–1897) to marry Signe Maria Hansen, a young and beautiful widow with literary and artistic interests who had been his wife's companion. During the winter of 1910-11, the spouses separated. Signe Thiel moved to a villa in Öland where she died in 1915.

The deflation crisis of 1920–1922 was one of the factors that led to Thiel's equity portfolio rapidly falling in value and his financial assets being destroyed. He was forced to pay heavy debt and to sell the property in 1924. Ernest Thiel became known as a translator of works by Nietzsche into Swedish and wrote his memoirs in 1946. He died in Stockholm during 1947.

== Thiel Gallery ==
Thiel's art collecting began in earnest in 1901, when he bought art for the then considerable sum of 19,000 crowns at the exhibition of the Konstnärsförbundet artist group. The following year he bought 19 paintings by Bruno Liljefors. The flat at Strandvägen into which he had moved with second wife in 1897 started to be cramped, and in 1904, Thiel commissioned the architect Ferdinand Boberg to build him a large villa at Blockhusudden in the Djurgården park area of Stockholm. It was soon discovered that the art collection had outgrown the building and Boberg had to add another large room in 1905. Prince Eugen, the painter and collector, had recently had Boberg design a combined residence and art gallery at Waldemarsudde in another part of Djurgården, which may have influenced Thiel. The Prince originally counteracted Thiel's plans and forced him to move his new house to a spot farther away from Waldemarsudde than he had first wanted, but when, in 1906, Eugen gave Thiel a painting of his, Nattmolnet, it was a sign that he had accepted his position in the art life of Sweden.

== Other sources ==
- Linde, Ulf, Thielska Galleriet. Stockholm, 1979. ISBN 91-970310-0-3 [a catalogue of the collections]. Contains the biographical introduction by the editor, "Ernest Thiels galleri", pp. 7–18, and autobiographical notes by Thiel, "Några smärre erinringar" ("A few small recollections"), pp. 19–24.
- Forssberg, Lars Ragnar (2015) Ernest Thiel : pengar & passion (Stockholm: Leopard) ISBN 978-91-7343-581-9
