= SACC =

SACC may refer to:

- SACC New York, the Swedish-American Chamber of Commerce, New York City, New York, U.S.
- Scotland Against Criminalising Communities, an organisation that campaigns against Britain's terrorism laws
- Selston Arts and Community College, Nottinghamshire, England
- Sexual Assault Care Centre, part of Women's College Hospital, Toronto, Ontario, Canada
- South African Council of Churches
- South Africa Conciliation Committee, 1899–1992
- South American Classification Committee, a committee under the American Ornithologists' Union
- South Asian College Chittagong, a college in Chittagong, Bangladesh
- Southern Africa Cat Council, a cat registry and cat fancy organisation
- Sacc., the author abbreviation of Italian botanist Pier Andrea Saccardo (1845–1920)
- small amount credit contract - Payday loan - Loan sharks - mentioned in Australian Parliament Hansard
- Salivary adenoid cystic carcinoma
