= List of Swedish cultural institutions =

This is a list of institutions related to the culture of Sweden.

Swedish 20th-century culture is noted by pioneering works by the early days of cinema, with Mauritz Stiller and Victor Sjöström. Later, moguls like Ingmar Bergman and actresses such as Greta Garbo, Ingrid Bergman and Anita Ekberg made careers abroad. Swedish music is in many minds connected with ABBA, although more recently indie bands like The Soundtrack of Our Lives, The Hives, Sahara Hotnights and The (International) Noise Conspiracy have started achieving international fame. The Swedish hip hop scene is booming. Swedish literature is also vibrant and active, and Sweden ranks third in the list of countries with the most Nobel Prize laureates in literature.

== Language-related institutions ==
- Strindberg Museum
- Swedish Academy
- Swedish Language Council

== Art and design instutitons ==
- Hallwyl Museum
- Millesgården
- Moderna Museet
- Nationalmuseum
- Nordic Watercolour Museum
- Prince Eugen's Waldemarsudde
- Röhsska Museum
- Rooseum
- Royal Swedish Academy of Arts
- Swedish Centre for Architecture and Design
- Swedish National Art Council
- Thiel Gallery
- Zorn Collections

== Music institutions ==
- Gothenburg Symphony Orchestra
- Royal Swedish Academy of Music
- Swedish National Collections of Music
- Swedish National Concert Institute

== Theatre and dance institutions ==
- Dansens hus (House of Dance)
- Dansmuseet
- Drottningholm Palace Theatre
- The Göteborg Opera
- Malmö Opera and Music Theatre
- NorrlandsOperan
- Royal Dramatic Theatre
- Royal Swedish Opera
- Swedish National Touring Theatre
- Stockholm City Theatre

== Heritage institutions ==
- Crown palaces in Sweden
- Livrustkammaren
- Maritime museums in Sweden
  - Marinmuseum
  - Maritiman
  - Maritime Museum (Stockholm)
  - Oskarshamn Maritime Museum
  - Vasa Museum
- Nordic Museum
- Skansen
- Skokloster Castle
- Swedish Army Museum
- Swedish History Museum
- Swedish Museum of Natural History
- Swedish National Heritage Board
- Swedish National Museum of Science and Technology
- Museum of Work
- Museum of World Culture

== Media ==
- List of Swedish newspapers
- List of Swedish radio channels
- List of Swedish television channels
- Sveriges Radio (Swedish Radio Ltd)
- Sveriges Television
- Sveriges Utbildningsradio (Swedish Educational Broadcasting Company)
- Swedish Film Institute
- Swedish National Board of Film Classification

== Archiving institutions ==
- Royal Swedish Academy of Letters, History and Antiquities
- Swedish Biographical Dictionary
- Swedish Institute for Dialectology, Onomastics and Folklore Research
- Swedish National Archives
- Swedish Regional Archives
