= Company mortgage (Sweden) =

A company mortgage (Företagshypotek) is a particular Swedish collateral right, which replaced the company chattel pledge (Företagsinteckning) on January 1, 2009.

A company or a (natural or legal) person that intends to run a business can pledge a company mortgage by registering a specific amount in the corporate mortgage register. The pledge is not tied to a particular property at a particular point in time. Instead the property can change over time. The idea behind this is the entrepreneur's personal property can be used as collateral for credit without them having to give up having the assets at their disposal.

The register is kept by the Registration Authority for Business Mortgages (Inskrivningsmyndigheten för företagsinteckningar), which is run by the Swedish Companies Registration Office (Bolagsverket). The agency issues proof of the registered pledge, called a mortgage letter (Inteckningsbrev). This proof can be either written or electronic. A written mortgage letter is pledged when the businessperson hands it over as collateral to a creditor. An electronic mortgage letter is deemed to be pledged when the creditor has been registered as the bearer (holder) of the mortgage letter.

The company mortgage gives special priority rights on a businessperson's personal property that belongs to the business other than cash or bank funds, stock or other publicly traded financial instruments, property that cannot be seized or be included in a bankruptcy, or property that can be pledged in other ways, such as aircraft and ships during both the seizure of assets and bankruptcy under §5 of the Priority Rights Act (Förmånsrättslagen). A company mortgage pledged before another company mortgage has priority. Company mortgages pledged on the same day have equal rights. At the request of the bearer of a company mortgage letter, the holding can be registered in the corporate mortgage register.

A decision by the registration authority may be appealed to District Court (Tingsrätt). In the appeal the Act on Court Cases (Lagen om Domstolsärenden) is applied. Anyone wishing to appeal a decision of the registration authority should do so in writing. The letter must be submitted to the registration authority.

The provisions relating to the company mortgage imply a return to the rules on company mortgages that applied before 2004.
