= Swedish Institute (disambiguation) =

There are several entities referred to as the Swedish Institute:

- Swedish Institute, a government agency in Sweden

== Swedish Institutes abroad ==
- Swedish Institute at Athens, an institute for archaeological research
- Swedish Institute at Rome, an institute for archaeological research
- American Swedish Institute
- Swedish Institute Alexandria

== Other Swedish Institutes ==
- Swedish Institute of Computer Science
- Swedish Institute for International Affairs
- Swedish Institute for Language and Folklore
- Swedish Institute of Space Physics
- Swedish Institute College of Health Sciences
