= Swedish invasion =

Swedish invasion may refer to:

- Swedish invasion of the Holy Roman Empire, 1630-1635
- Swedish invasion of Poland, 1655, during the "Deluge"
- Swedish invasion of Brandenburg, 1674/1675, the Swedish invasion of Brandenburg during the Scanian War
