= Thiel Gallery =

Art museum in Stockholm, Sweden

Coordinates: 59°19′20″N 18°08′55″E

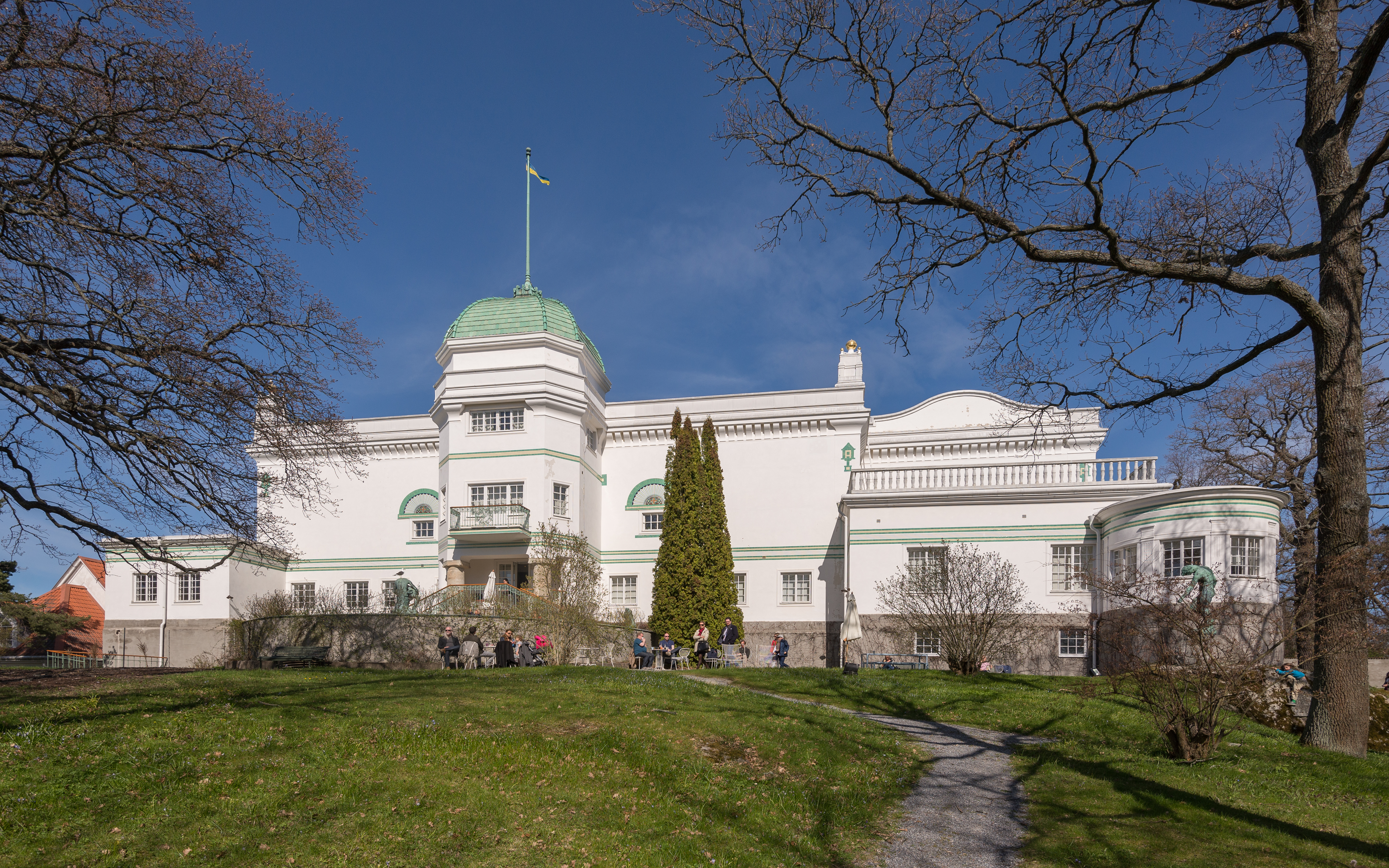
Thiel Gallery

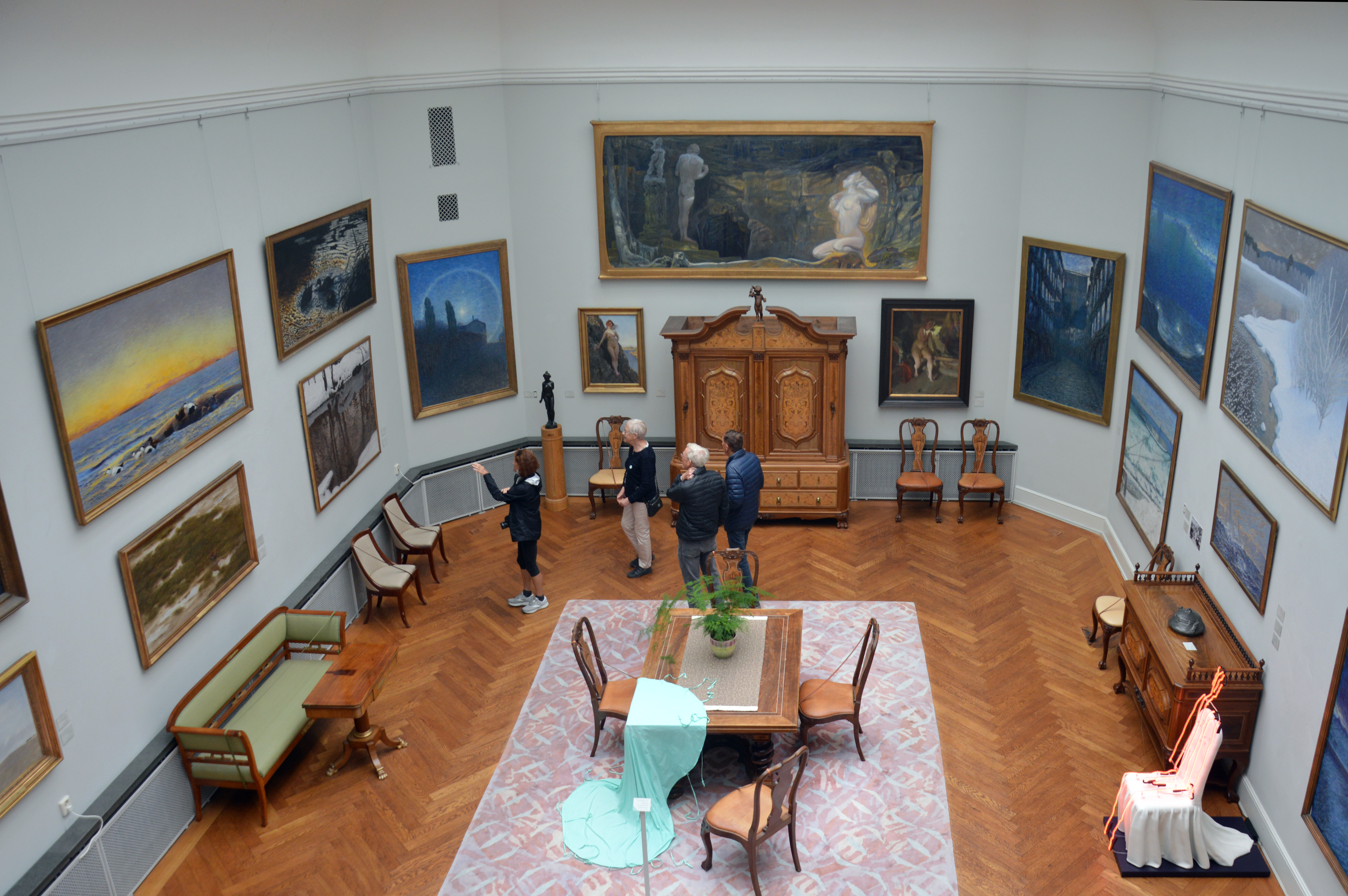
Western gallery

The Thiel Gallery (Swedish: Thielska galleriet) is an art museum in the Djurgården park area of Stockholm, Sweden. Represented are the members of the Artists Association (Konstnärsförbundet) from the early 1900s as well as one of the world's largest collections of works by Edvard Munch.

== History ==
The museum was originally the private residence and art gallery of the banker and collector Ernest Thiel (1859–1947), who acquired art made by his contemporaries among Scandinavian artists, such as Bruno Liljefors, Anders Zorn, Eugène Jansson and Edvard Munch.

The house was built between 1904 and 1907, and it was designed in the Art Nouveau style with white façades by the architect Ferdinand Boberg (1860–1946). The inauguration took place in March 1907. By 1922, Thiel had lost his fortune and he was forced to sell the villa, collection and fixtures. The gallery was acquired by the state in 1924 and opened to the public in 1926. Since then, the building has been rebuilt and modernized several times.

== Gallery ==
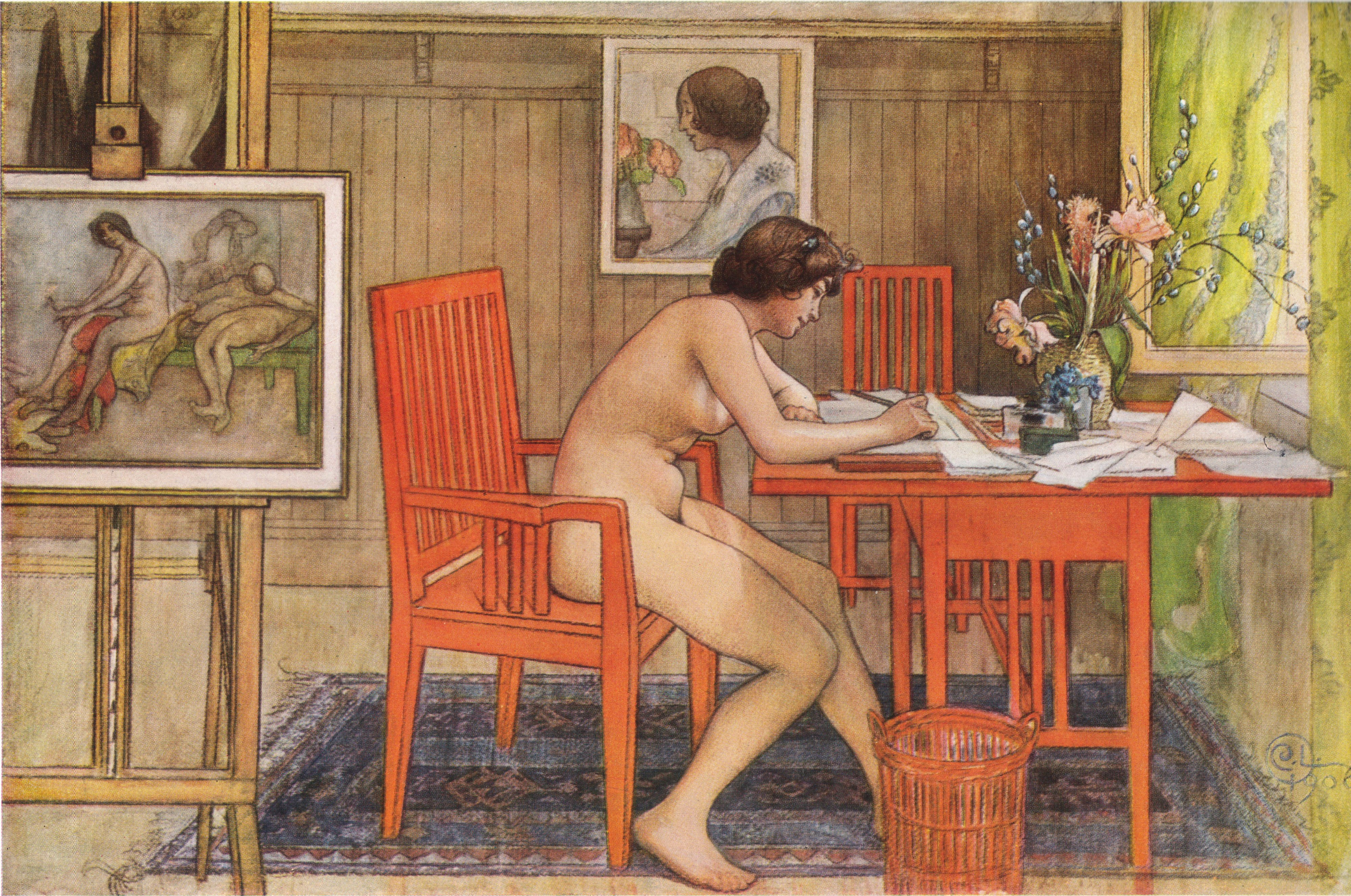
Carl Larsson
Modellen skriver vykort

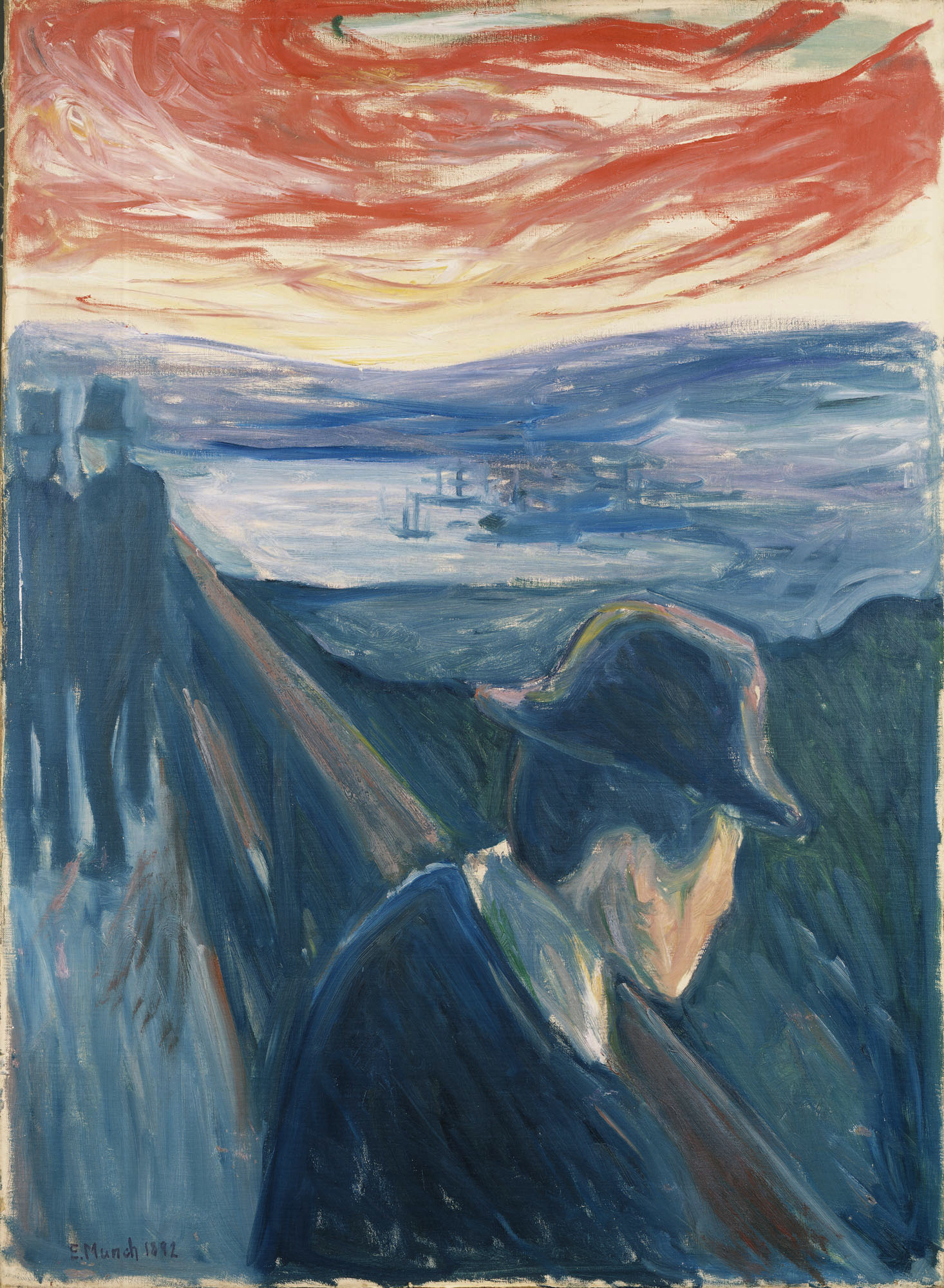
Edvard Munch
Förtvivlan

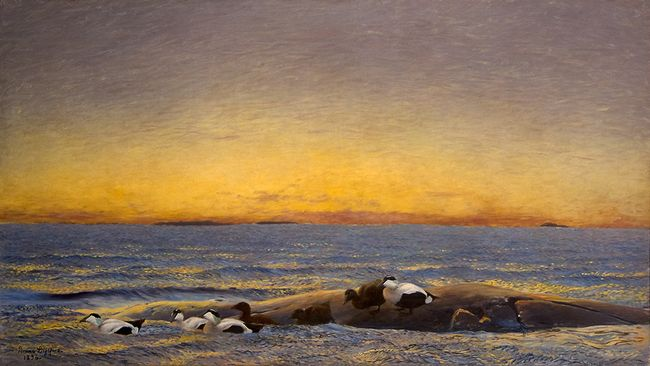
Bruno Liljefors
Morgonstämning vid havet

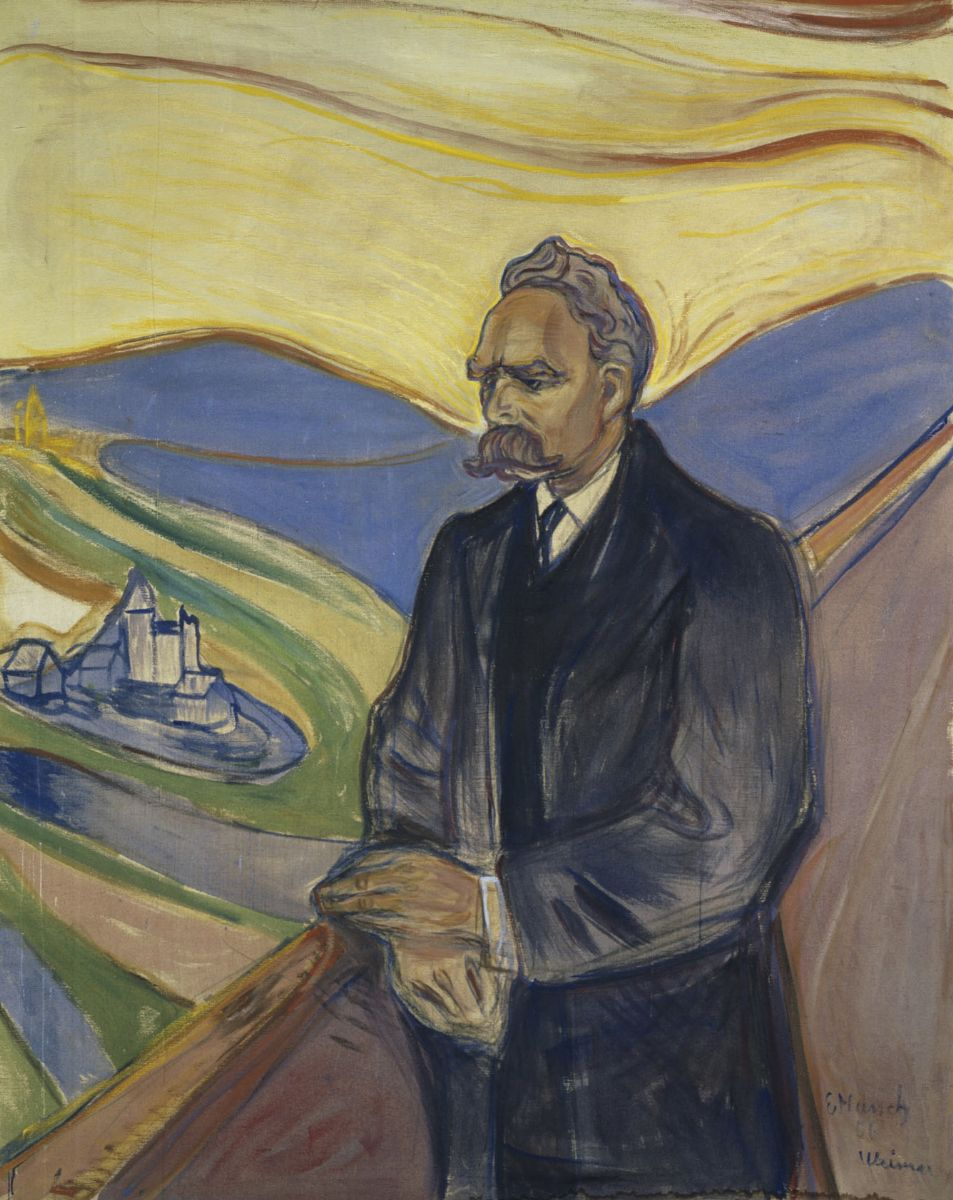
Edvard Munch
Friedrich Nietzsche

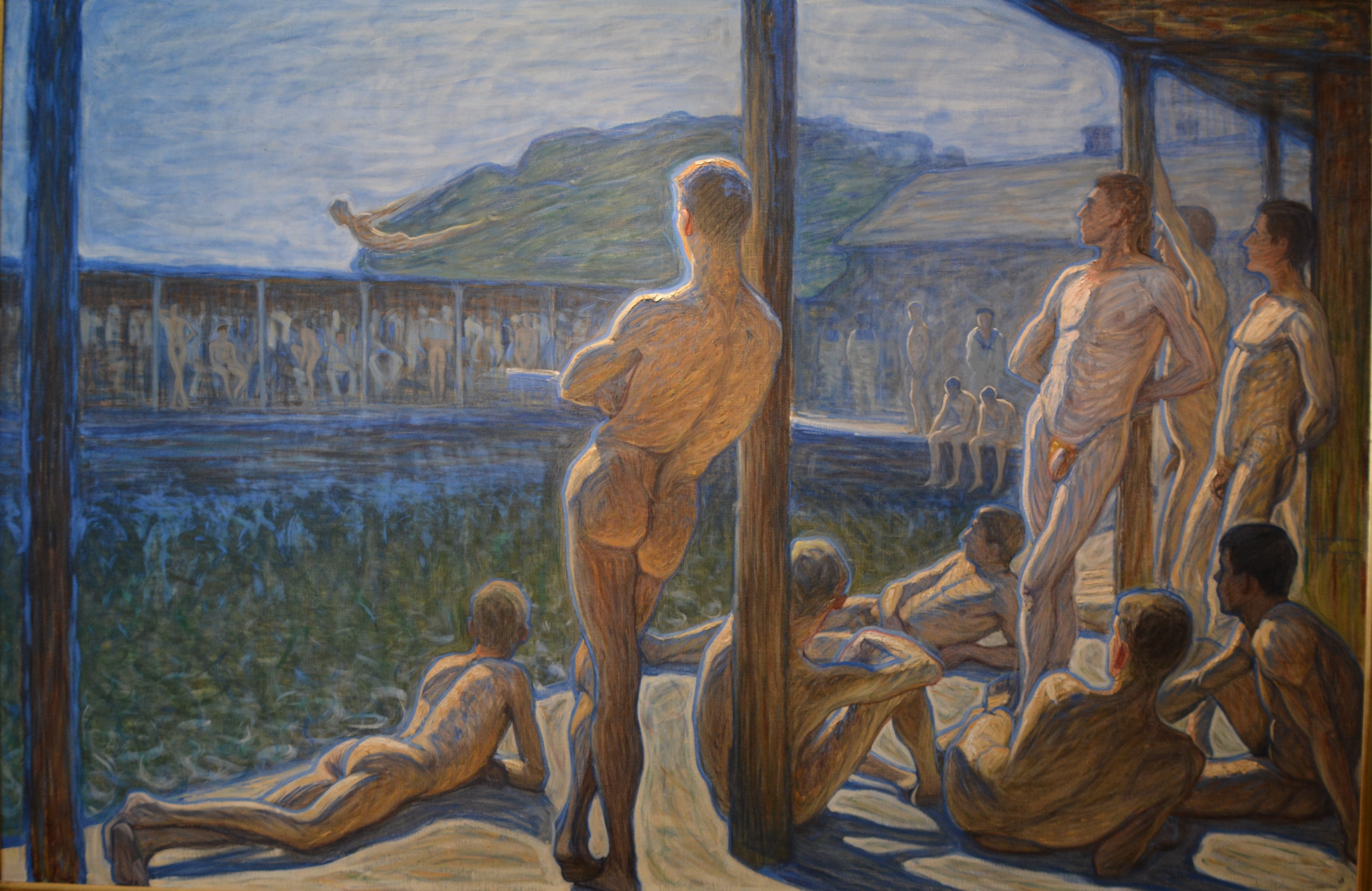
Eugène Jansson
Flottans badhus

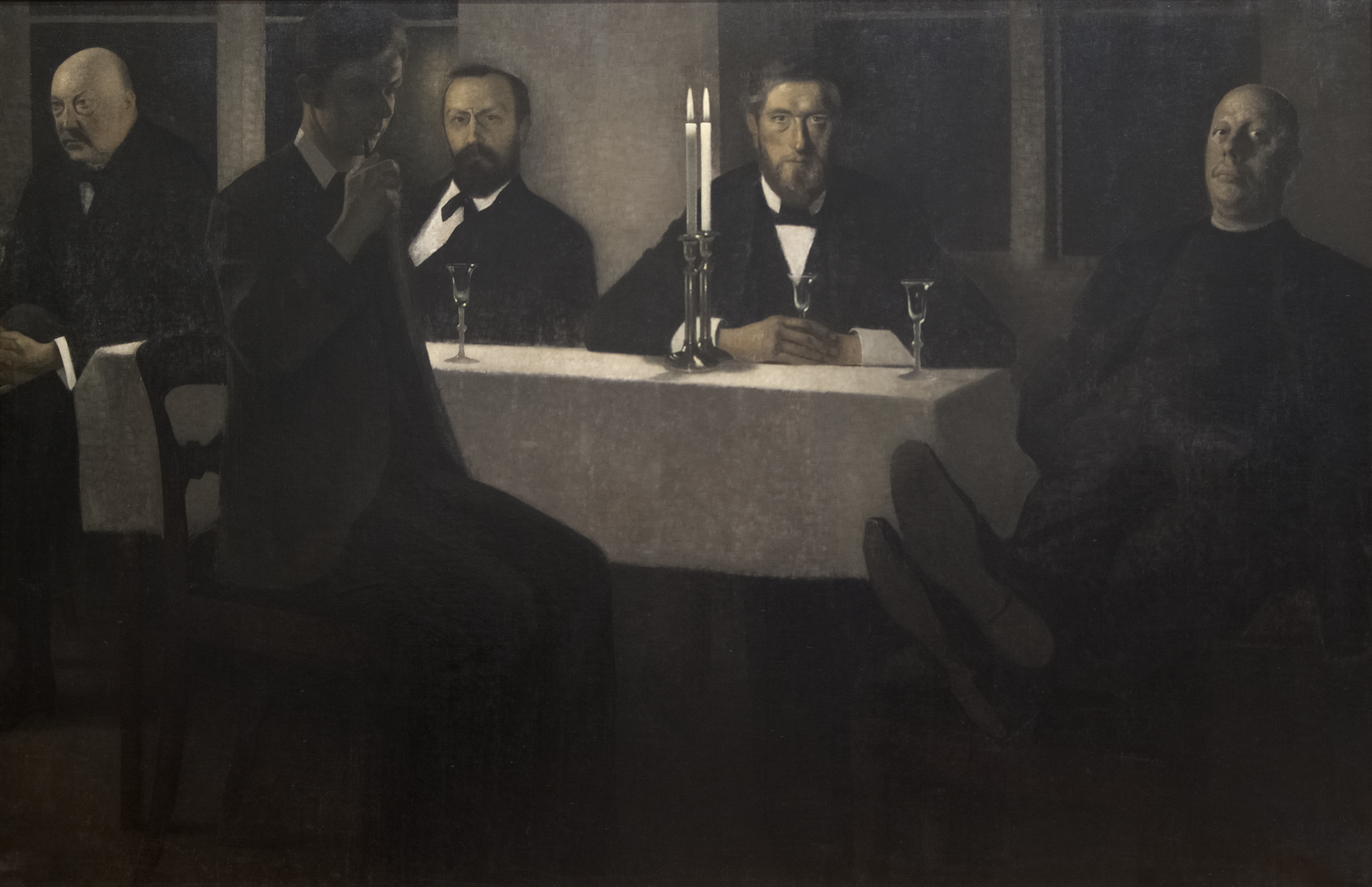
Vilhelm Hammershøi Fem porträtt

== See also ==
- List of museums in Stockholm
