= Swedish Church (disambiguation) =

Swedish Church may refer to:

== Churches ==
- Church of Sweden
- Catholic Church in Sweden
- Swedish Evangelical Lutheran Church (disambiguation)
- Uniting Church in Sweden (Equmeniakyrkan) initially Joint Future Church made up of the union of:
  - Baptist Union of Sweden
  - Mission Covenant Church of Sweden
  - United Methodist Church of Sweden
