= List of Swedish governments =

This is a list of Swedish governments and rulers, from the end of the Kalmar Union until the breakthrough of parliamentarism.

- 1521-1523 : Regent Gustaf Eriksson Vasa (Continued as king)
- 1523-1560 : King Gustaf I of Sweden
- 1560-1568 : King Eric XIV of Sweden
- 1568-1592 : King John III of Sweden
- 1592-1599 : King Sigismund of Sweden
- 1599-1604 : Duke Charles (Continued as king)
- 1604-1611 : King Charles IX of Sweden
- 1611-1632 : King Gustav Adolphus the Great
- 1632-1644 : Chancellor Axel Oxenstierna, leader of government under the minority of the monarch
- 1644-1654 : Queen Christina of Sweden
- 1654-1660 : King Charles X Gustav of Sweden
- 1660-1672 : Privy Council, government under the minority of the monarch
- 1672-1697 : King Charles XI of Sweden
- 1697-1697 : Privy Council, government under the minority of the monarch
- 1697-1718 : King Charles XII of Sweden
- 1718-1738 : Chancellery President Arvid Horn, leader of a Cap Party government
- 1738-1765 : Parliamentary rule with a Hat Party government
- 1765-1769 : Parliamentary rule with a Cap Party government
- 1769-1772 : Parliamentary rule with a Hat Party government
- 1772-1792 : King Gustaf III of Sweden, enlightened despotism
- 1792-1792 : Regent Duke Charles, leader of government under the minority of the monarch
- 1792-1796 : Gustaf Adolf Reuterholm, leader of government under the minority of the monarch
- 1796-1809 : King Gustaf IV Adolf of Sweden
- 1809-1810 : Parliamentary rule
- 1810-1818 : Regent Crown Prince Charles (Continued as king)
- 1818-1844 : King Charles XIV of Sweden
- 1844-1857 : King Oscar I of Sweden
- 1857-1859 : Regent Crown Prince Charles (Continued as king)
- 1859-1872 : King Charles XV of Sweden
- 1872-1907 : King Oscar II of Sweden

The post of Prime Minister of Sweden was introduced in 1876 and continued to rise in importance until the breakthrough of parliamentarism in the 1910s. King Gustaf V of Sweden acceded to the throne in 1907 and became the last king that tried to influence government politics in 1914. In 1921 universal suffrage was introduced and Sweden achieved full parliamentary democracy.

== See also ==
- List of Swedish monarchs
- List of cabinets of Sweden
- State leaders by year
- Politics of Sweden
- Constitution of Sweden
- Riksdag
