= Bruno Liljefors =

Swedish artist

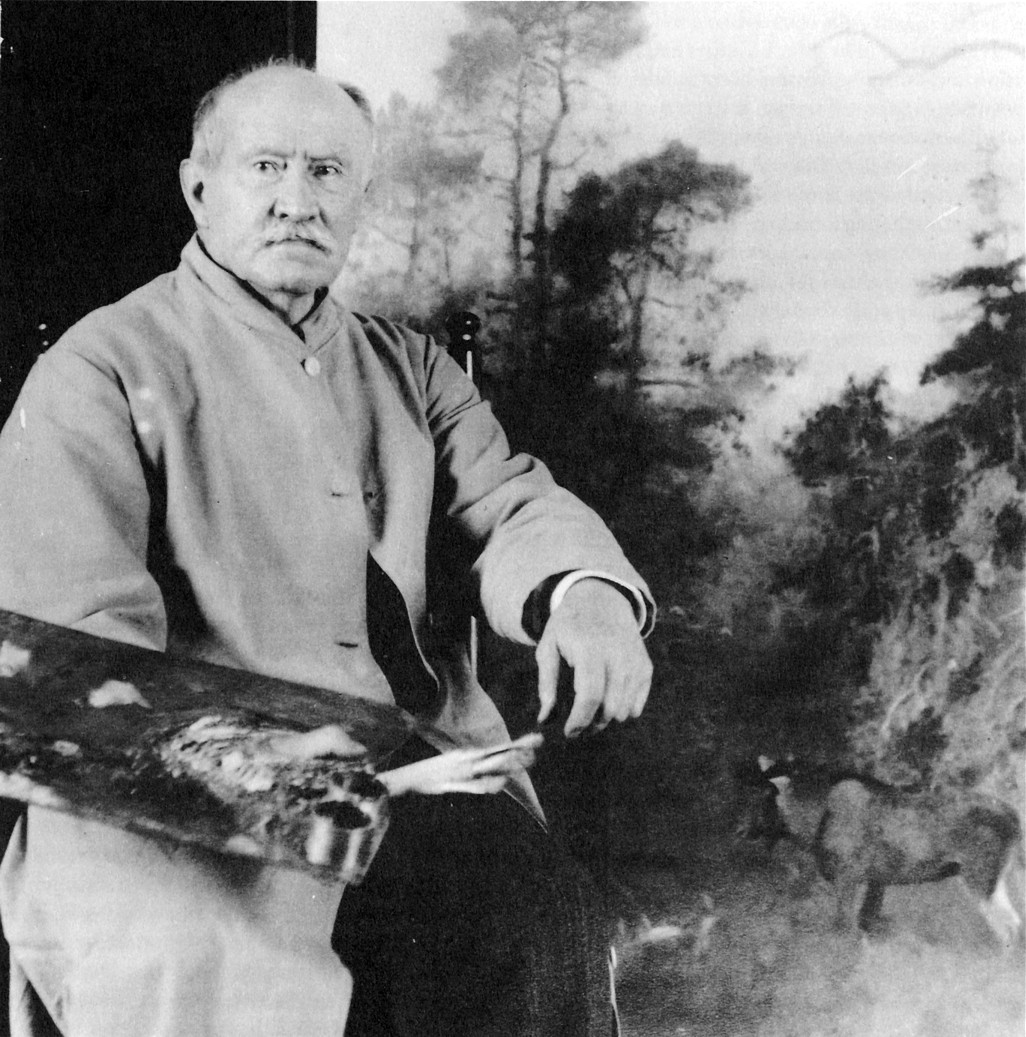
- Liljefors at work in his studio at Österbybruk
- Born: Bruno Andreas Liljefors; 14 May 1860; Uppsala, Sweden
- Died: 18 December 1939 (aged 79); Stockholm, Sweden
- Education: Royal Swedish Academy of Arts, Stockholm
- Known for: Painting

Bruno Andreas Liljefors (Swedish pronunciation: [ˈbrʉ̌ːnʊ ˈlɪ̂lːjɛˌfɔʂ]; 14 May 1860 – 18 December 1939) was a Swedish artist. He is perhaps best known for his nature and animal motifs, especially in dramatic situations. He was the most important and probably most influential Swedish wildlife painter of the late nineteenth and early twentieth centuries. He also drew some sequential picture stories, making him one of the early Swedish comic creators.

== Biography ==
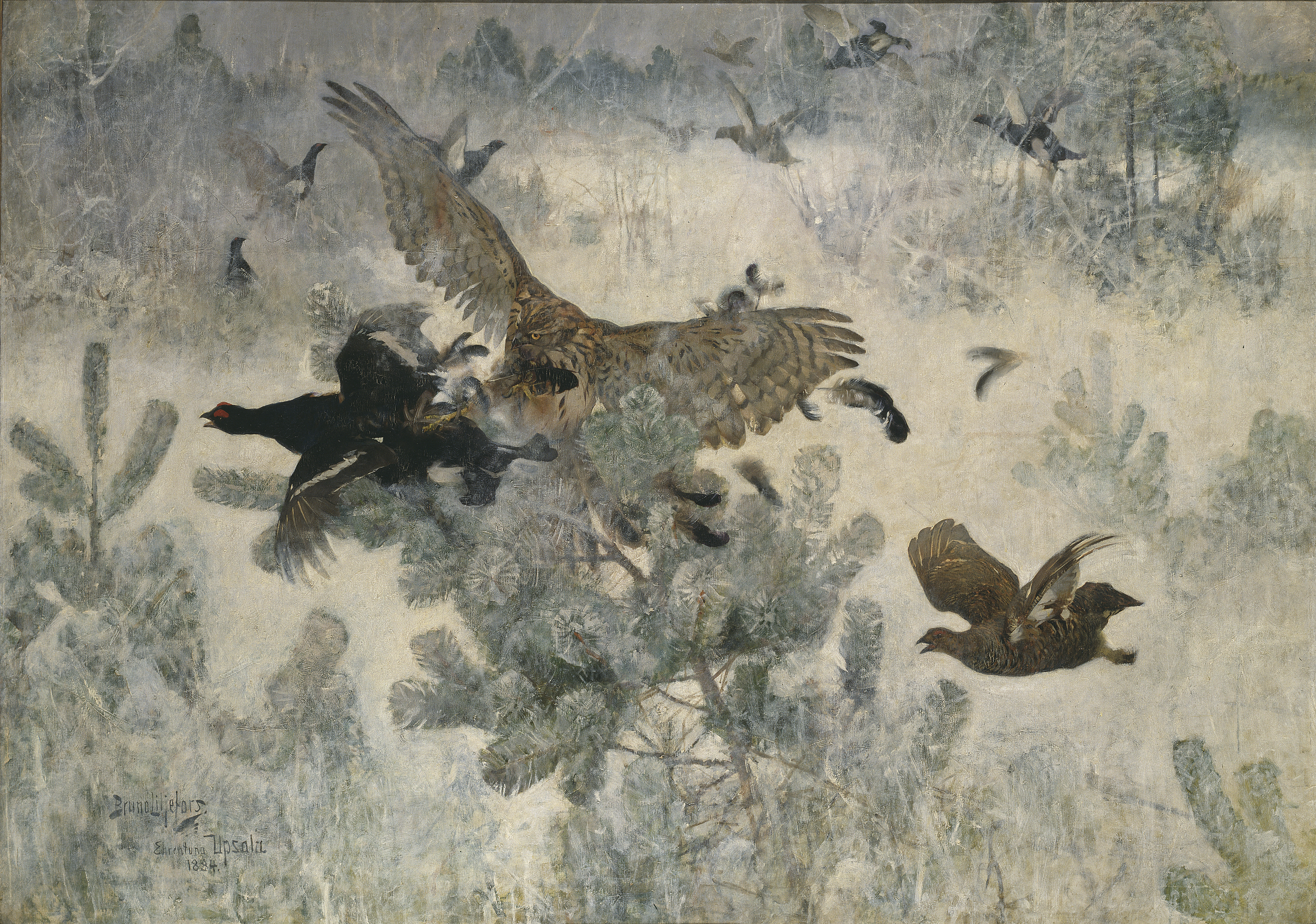
Hawk and Black-Game (1884)

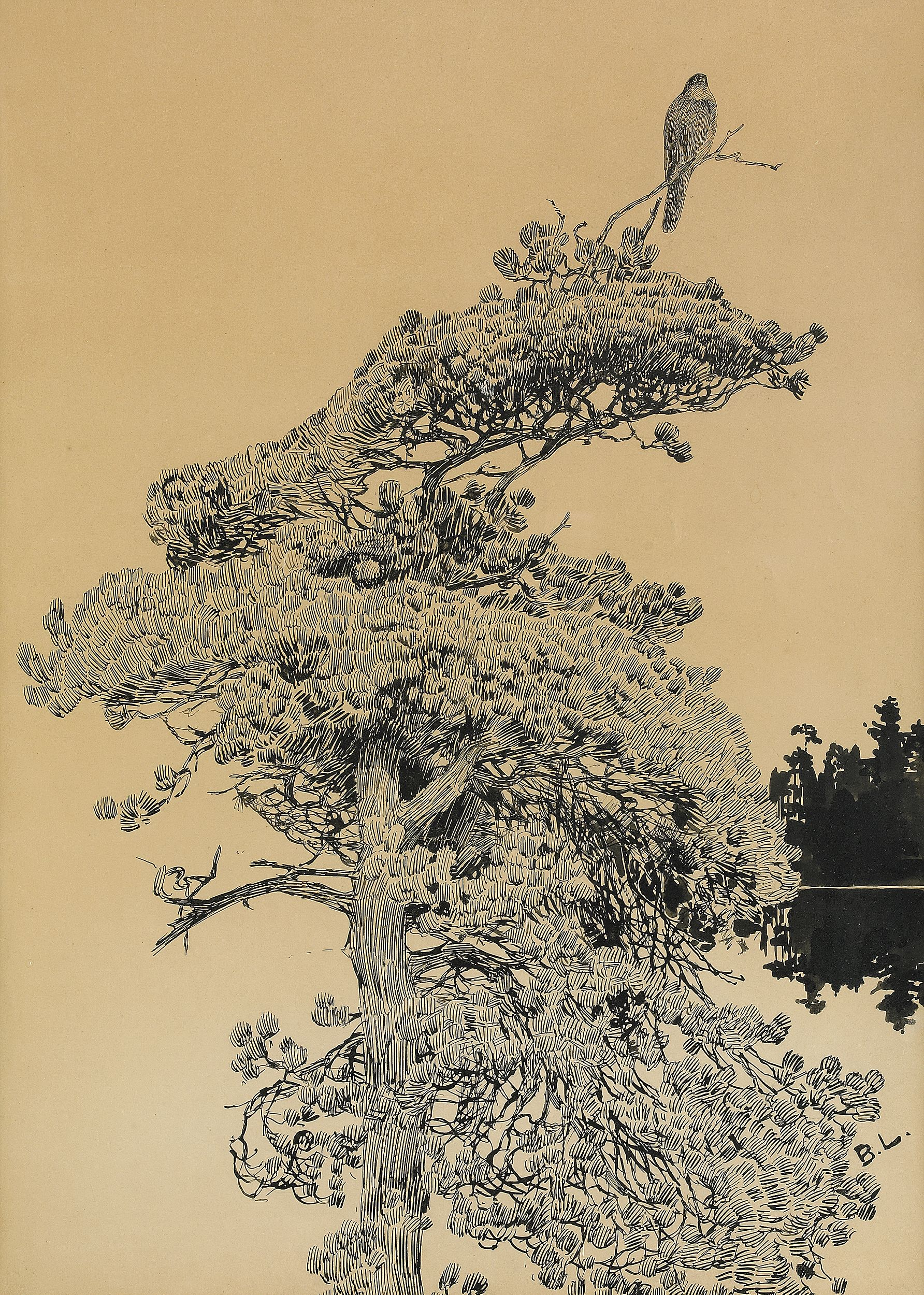
Peregrine falcon in treetop

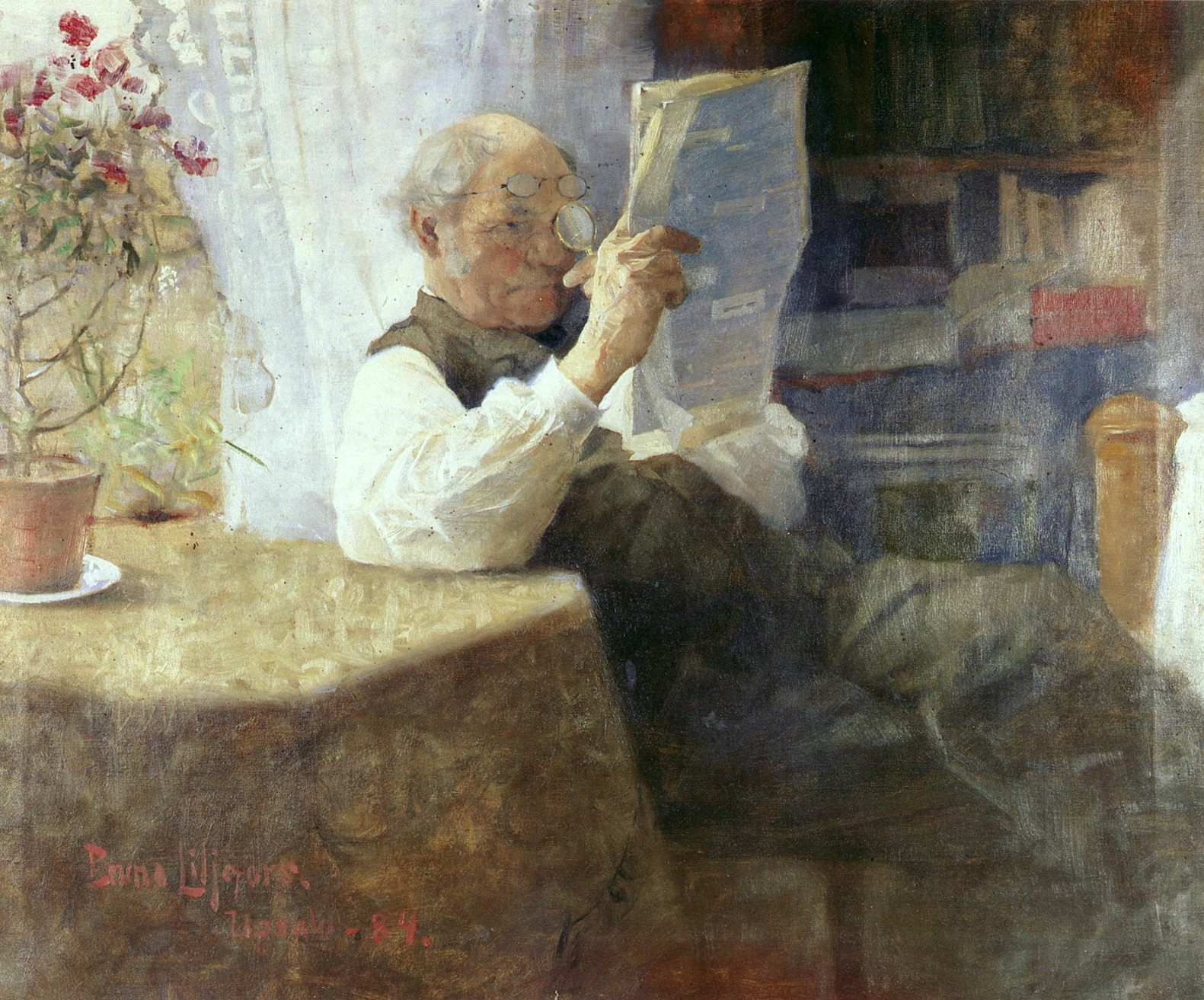
Portrait of the artist’s father (1884)

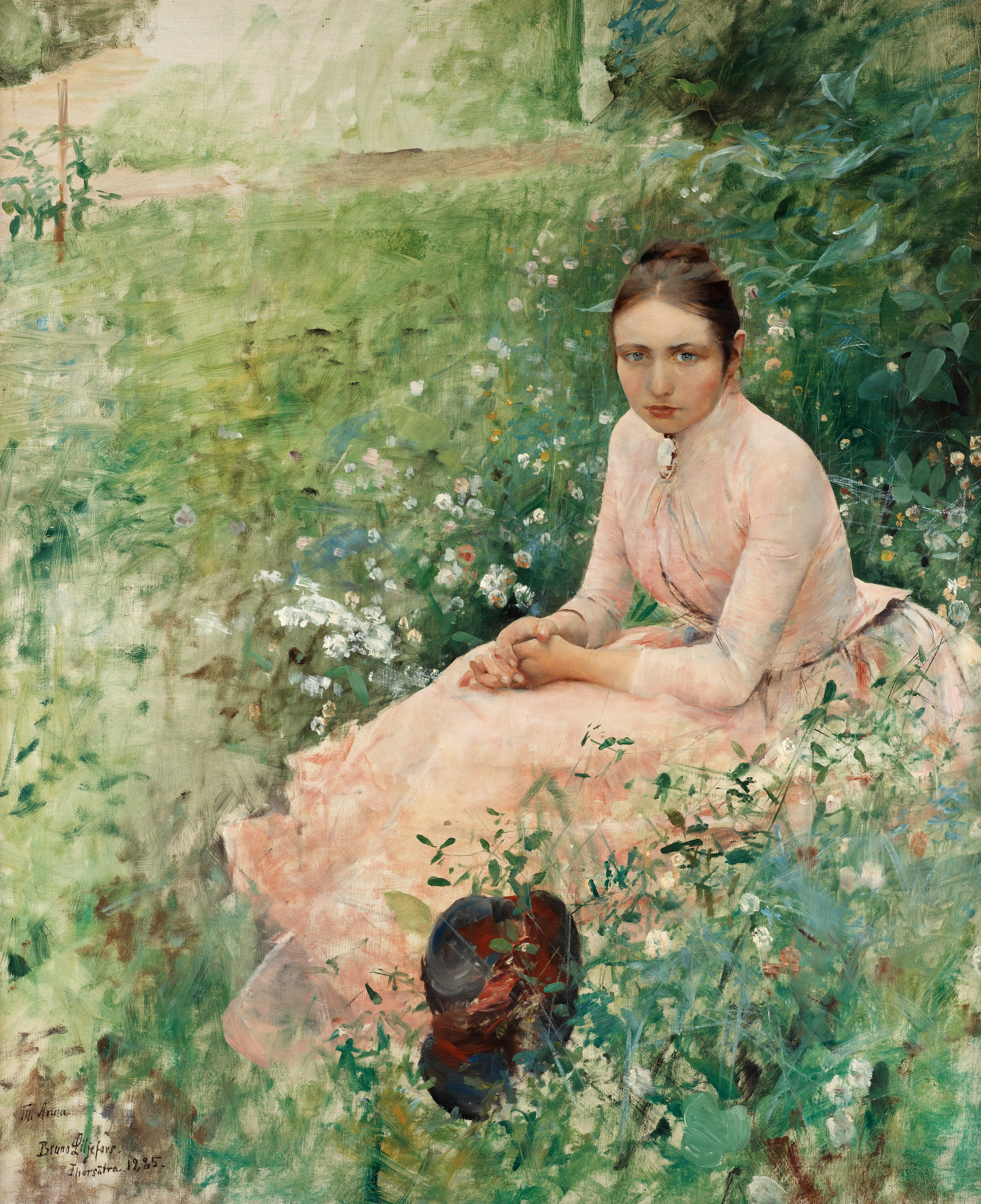
Anna (1885)

Liljefors was born in Uppsala, Sweden, to Anders Liljefors and Maria Margareta Lindbäck. His brother was the composer and conductor Ruben Liljefors (1871–1936). Bruno Liljefors first studied at Katedralskolan for six years and then pursued further education at the Swedish Royal Academy of Fine Arts from 1879 to 1882. Thereafter, he made a study trip to Düsseldorf, Baiern, Venice, Florence, Naples, Rome and Paris between 1882 and 1883. He received inspiration from the Scandinavian artist colony in Grez-sur-Loing. In 1886, he became a member of the Artists' Union (Konstnärsförbundet), which was in opposition to the Royal Academy. From 1888–1889, he taught at Valand Academy in Gothenburg.

In 1887, he married Anna Olivia Olofsson (1864–1947). The marriage ended with a divorce in 1895, at which time he married his first wife's younger sister, Signe Adolfina Helena Olofsson (1871–1944). He was a resident of Uppsala until the summer of 1894, when he sought out the Stockholm archipelago. From 1905–1917, he lived at Ytterjärna in Södermanland and from 1917 to Österbybruk in Uppland. He established a studio in Österbybruk, where he lived and worked between 1917 and 1932.

During the last years of the nineteenth century, a brooding element entered his work, perhaps the result of turmoil in his private life. He was often short of money and in 1925, he suffered a facial neuralgia with severe pain. From 1932, Liljefors lived at Kungsholmen in Stockholm. The last two years of his life, he spent in Uppsala. Liljefors died in 1939 and was buried at the Uppsala old cemetery.

== Work ==
Liljefors is held in high esteem by painters of wildlife and is acknowledged as an influence by, for example, American wildlife artist Michael Coleman. All his life, Liljefors was a hunter, and he often painted predator-prey action, the hunts engaged between fox and hare, sea eagle and eider, and goshawk and black grouse serving as prime examples. However, he never exaggerated the ferocity of the predator or the pathos of the prey, and his pictures are devoid of sentimentality.

Evening Wild Ducks (1901)

The darker quality in his paintings gradually began to attract interest, and he had paintings exhibited at the Paris Salon. The influence of the Impressionists can be seen in his attention to the effects of environment and light, and later that of Art Nouveau in his painting of Mallards, Evening Wild Ducks, of 1901, in which the pattern of the low sunlight on the water looks like leopardskin, hence the Swedish nickname Panterfällen. Bruno was fascinated by the patterns to be found in nature, and he often made art out of the camouflage patterns of animals and birds. He particularly loved painting capercaillies against woodland, and his most successful painting of this subject is the large-scale Capercaillie Lek, 1888, in which he captures the atmosphere of the forest at dawn. He was also influenced by Japanese art, for example, in his Goldfinches, painted in 1889.

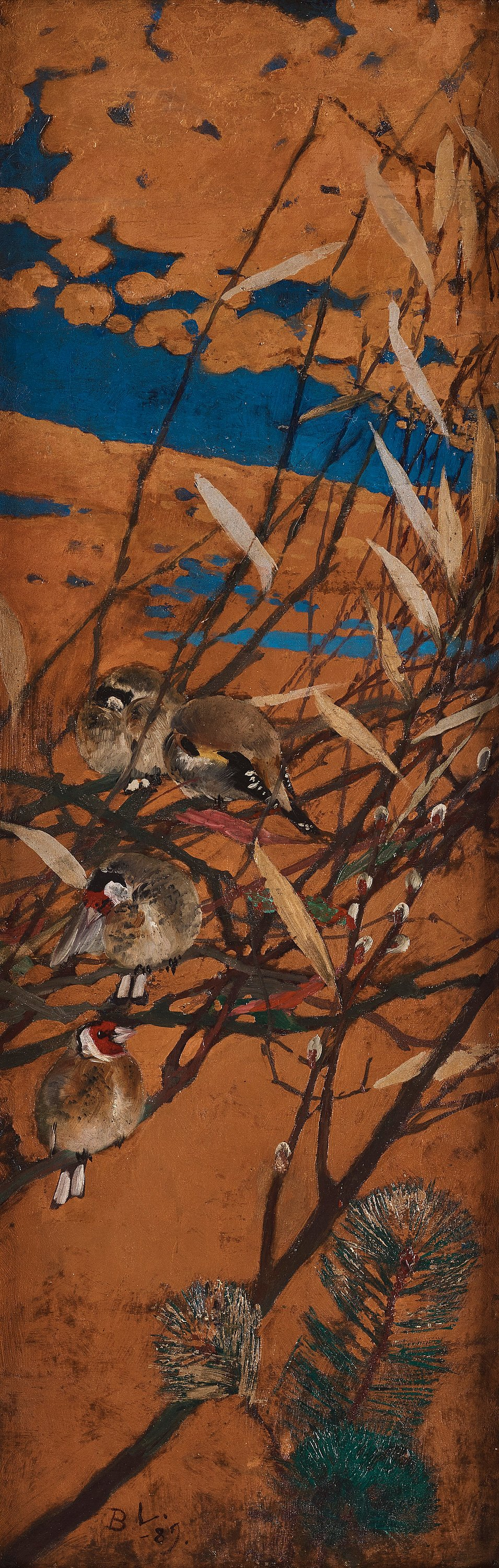
Goldfinches (1889)

Collections of his art are on display at the Nationalmuseum, Gothenburg Museum of Art, Thiel Gallery and Uppsala University. His work was also part of the painting event in the art competition at the 1932 Summer Olympics.

== Style ==
He amassed a collection of animals to act as his living models. Ernst Malmberg recalled:

The animals seemed to have an instinctive trust and actual attraction to him. There in his animal enclosure, we saw his inevitable power over its many residents—foxes, badgers, hares, squirrels, weasels, an eagle, eagle owl, hawk, capercaillie and black game.

The greatness of Liljefors lay in his ability to show animals in their environment. Sometimes he achieved this through hunting and observation of the living animal, and sometimes he used dead animals; for example, his Hawk and Black Game, painted in the winter of 1883–84, was based on dead specimens, but he also used his memory of the flocks of black grouse in the meadows around a cottage he once lived in at Ehrentuna, near Uppsala. He wrote:

The hawk model—a young one—I killed myself. Everything was painted out of doors as was usually done in those days. It was a great deal of work trying to position the dead hawk and the grouse among the bushes that I bent in such a way as to make it seem lively, although the whole thing was in actuality a still life.

Winter landscapes

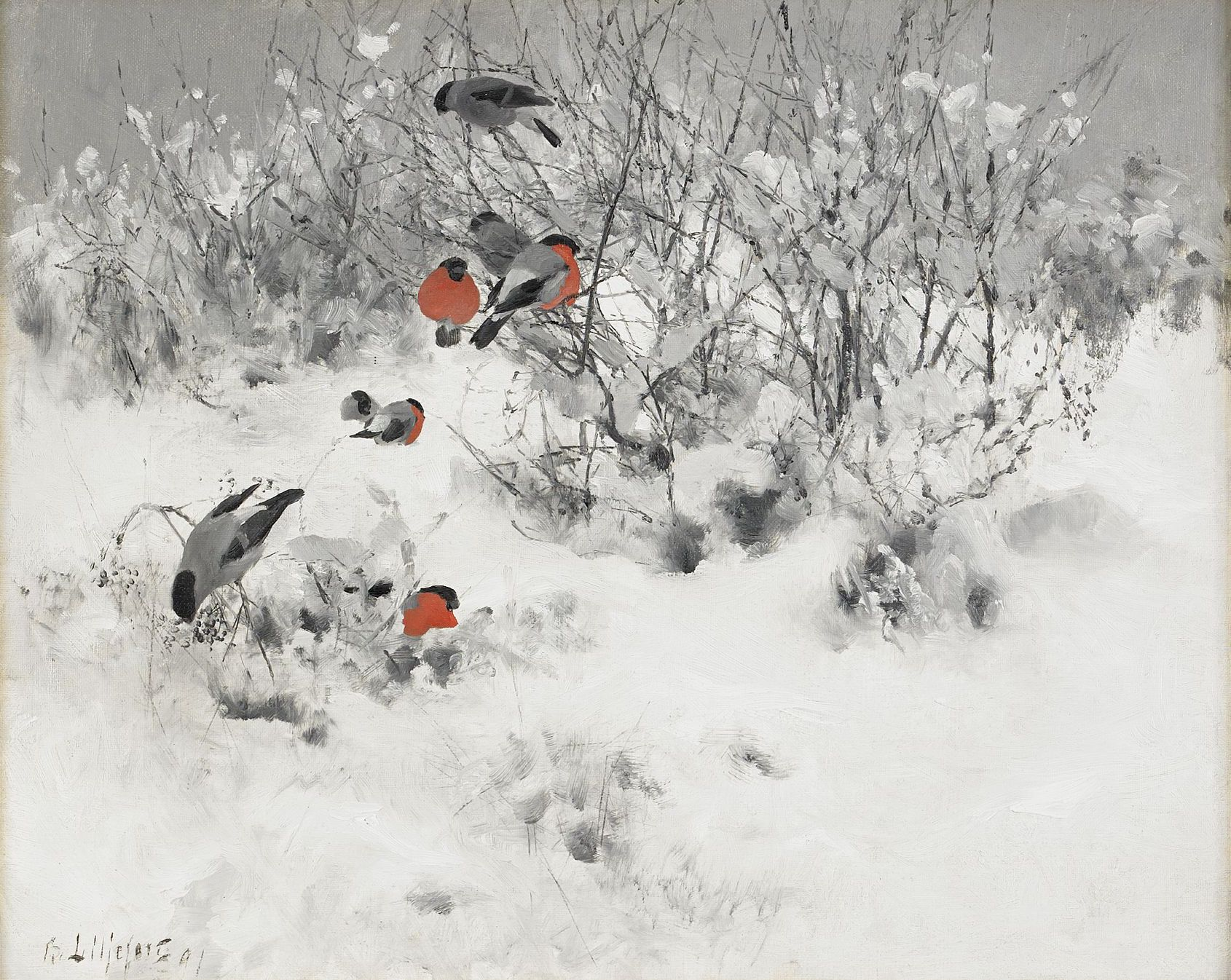
Winter landscape with bullfinches, 1891

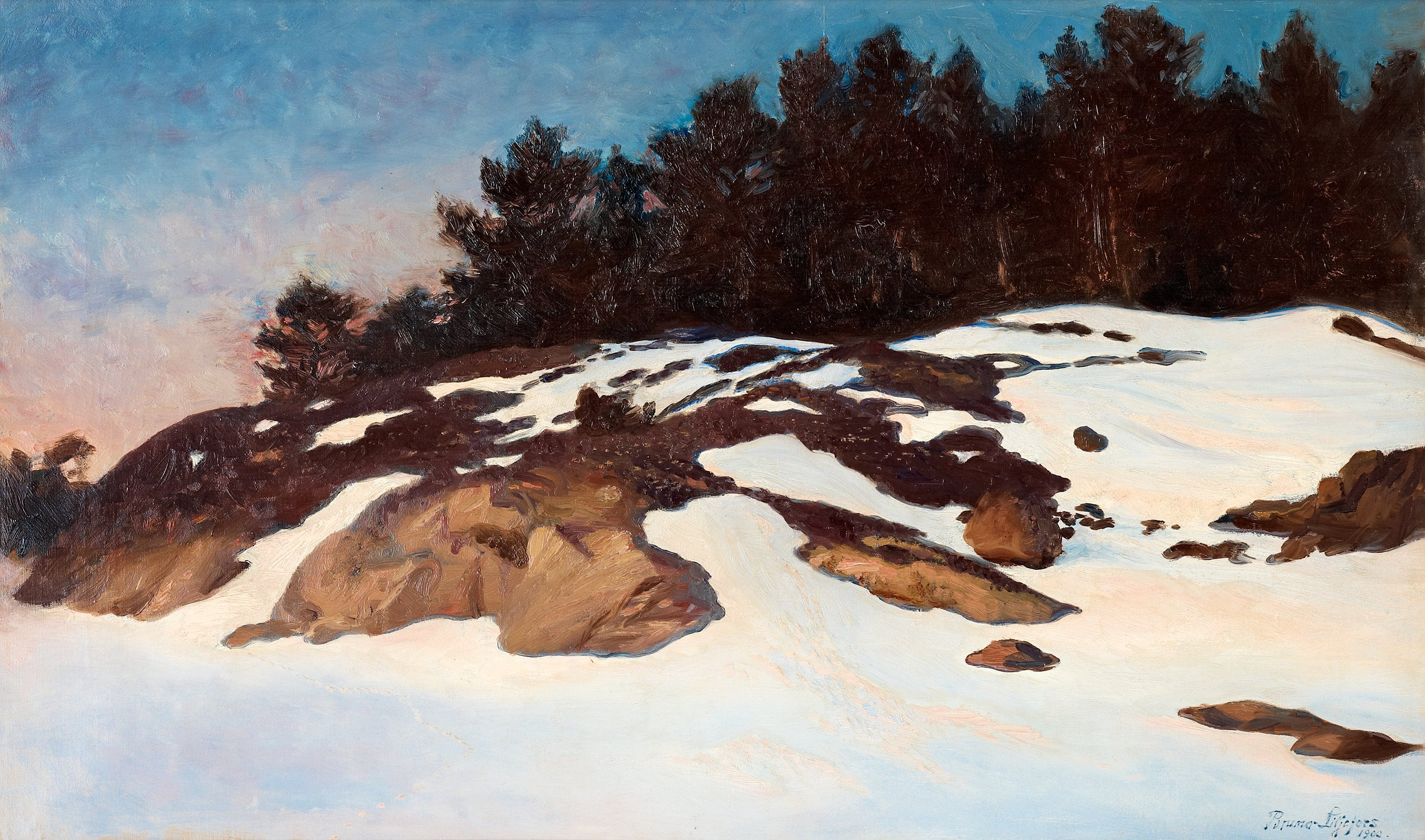
Winter landscape at dawn, 1900

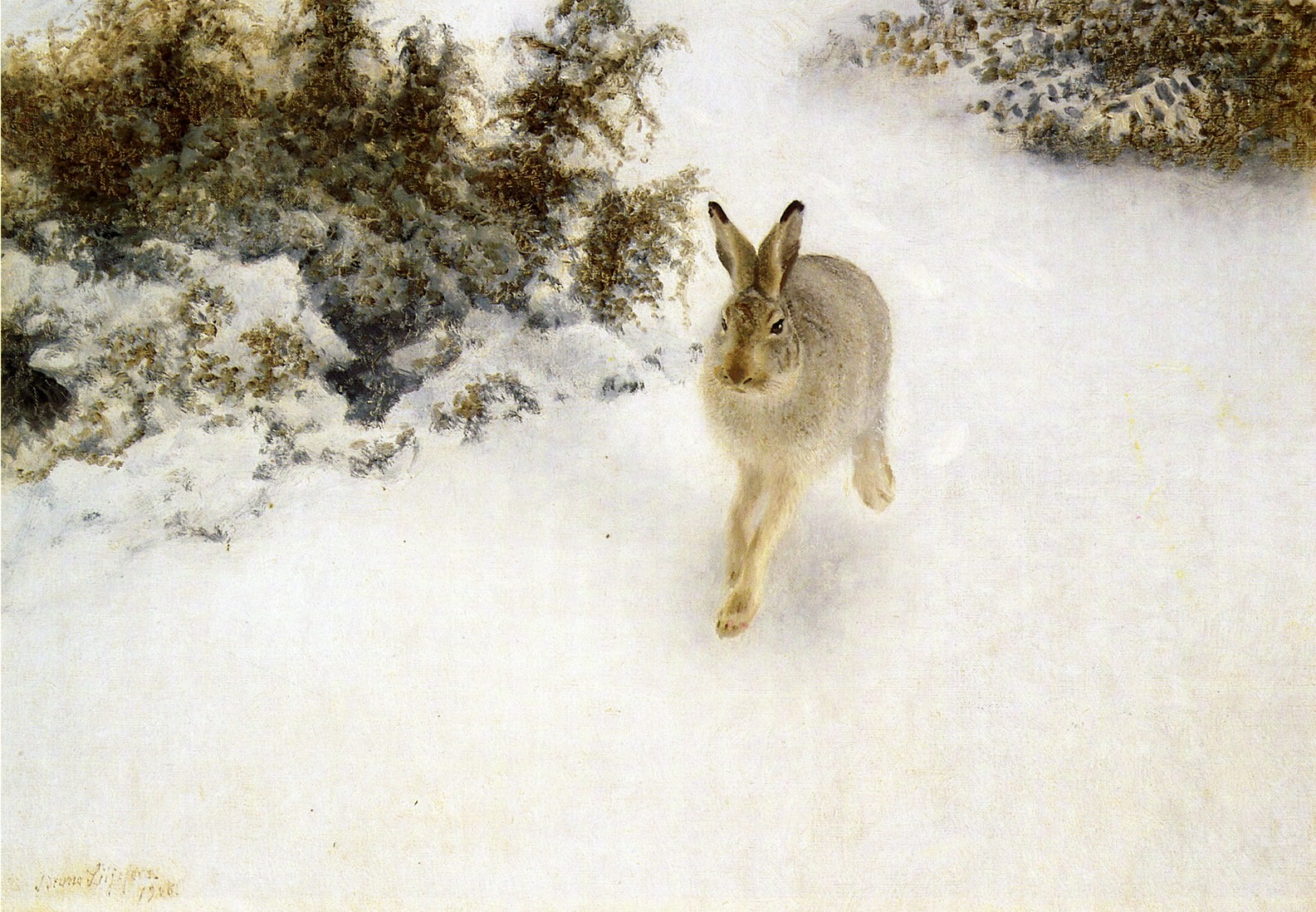
Winter hare, 1908

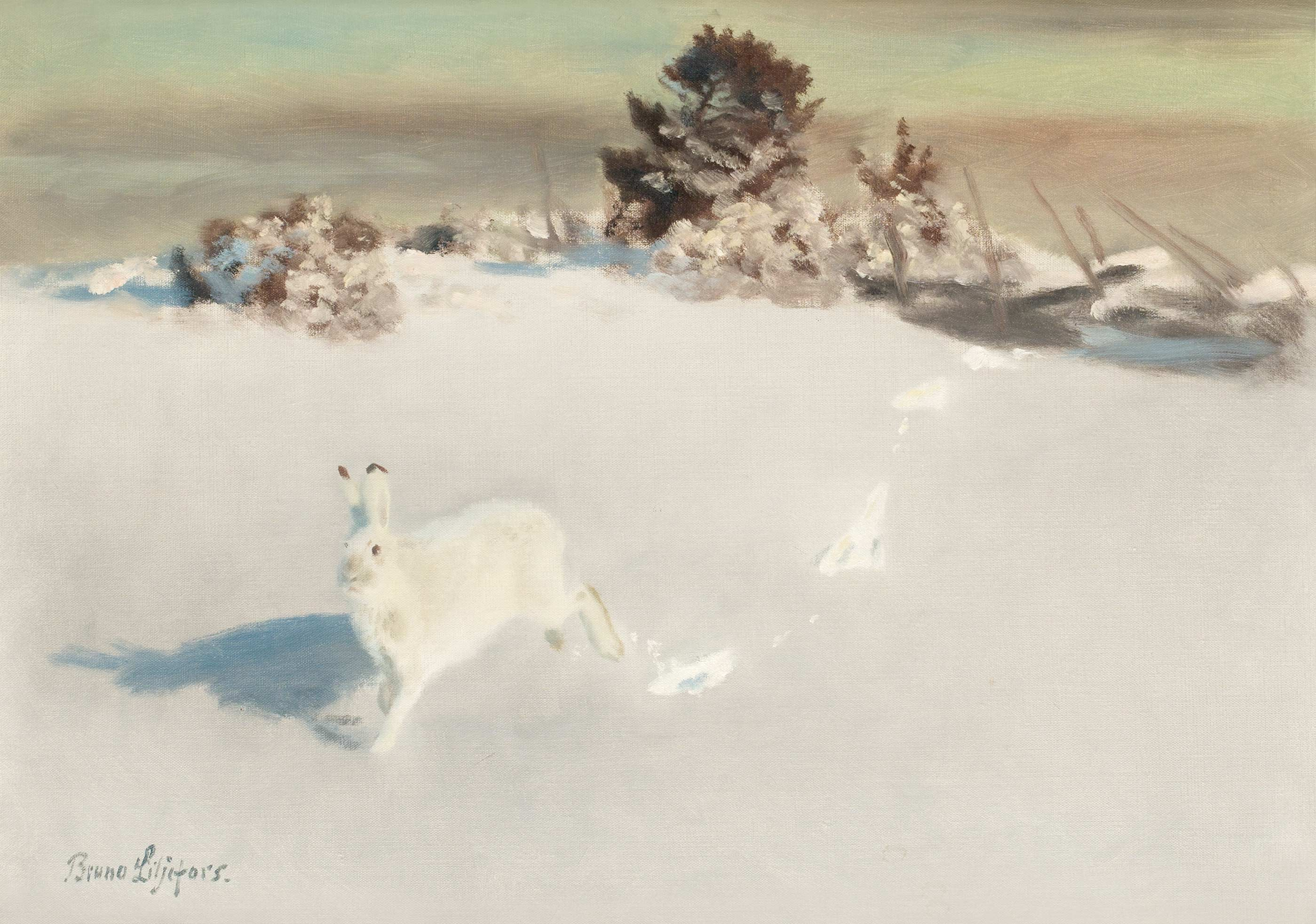
Winter hare, undated

== Assessment ==
Such practices have sometimes led to criticism of Liljefors' work; Lars Jonsson has noted a "heraldisation" of the drama in Golden Eagle Chasing a Hare, 1904, which causes a departure from pure naturalism, and he deduces from the position of the eagle's wing feathers that it would have been gliding rather than turning in reaction to the hare as painted.

Nevertheless, Liljefors was a pioneer at a time when wildlife art was still emerging from its association with scientific depiction and taxidermy. He also set a standard of identification with the landscape that substantially influenced the development of wildlife art in the twentieth century.

== Paintings ==
Foxes, 1885

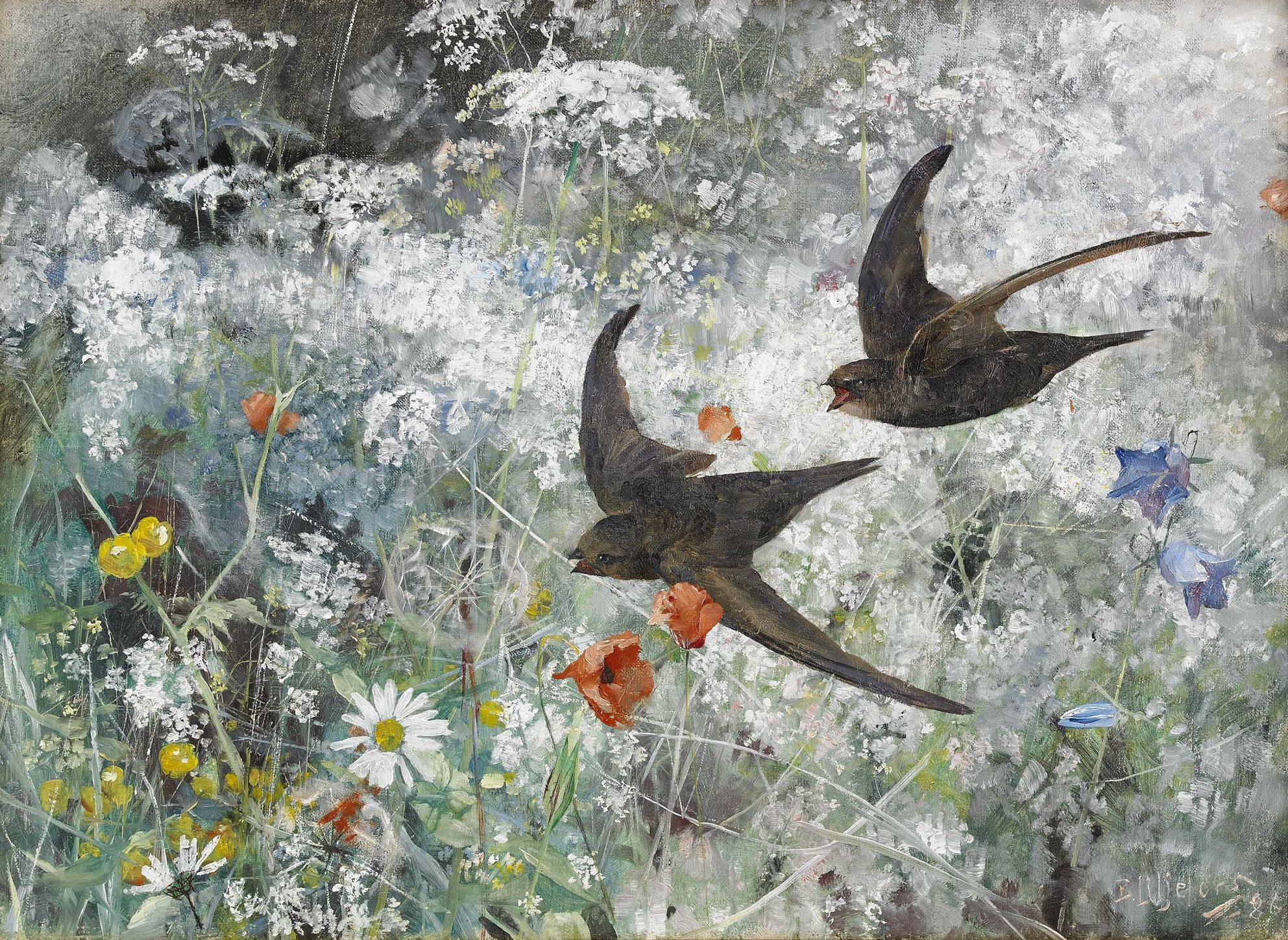
Swifts, 1886

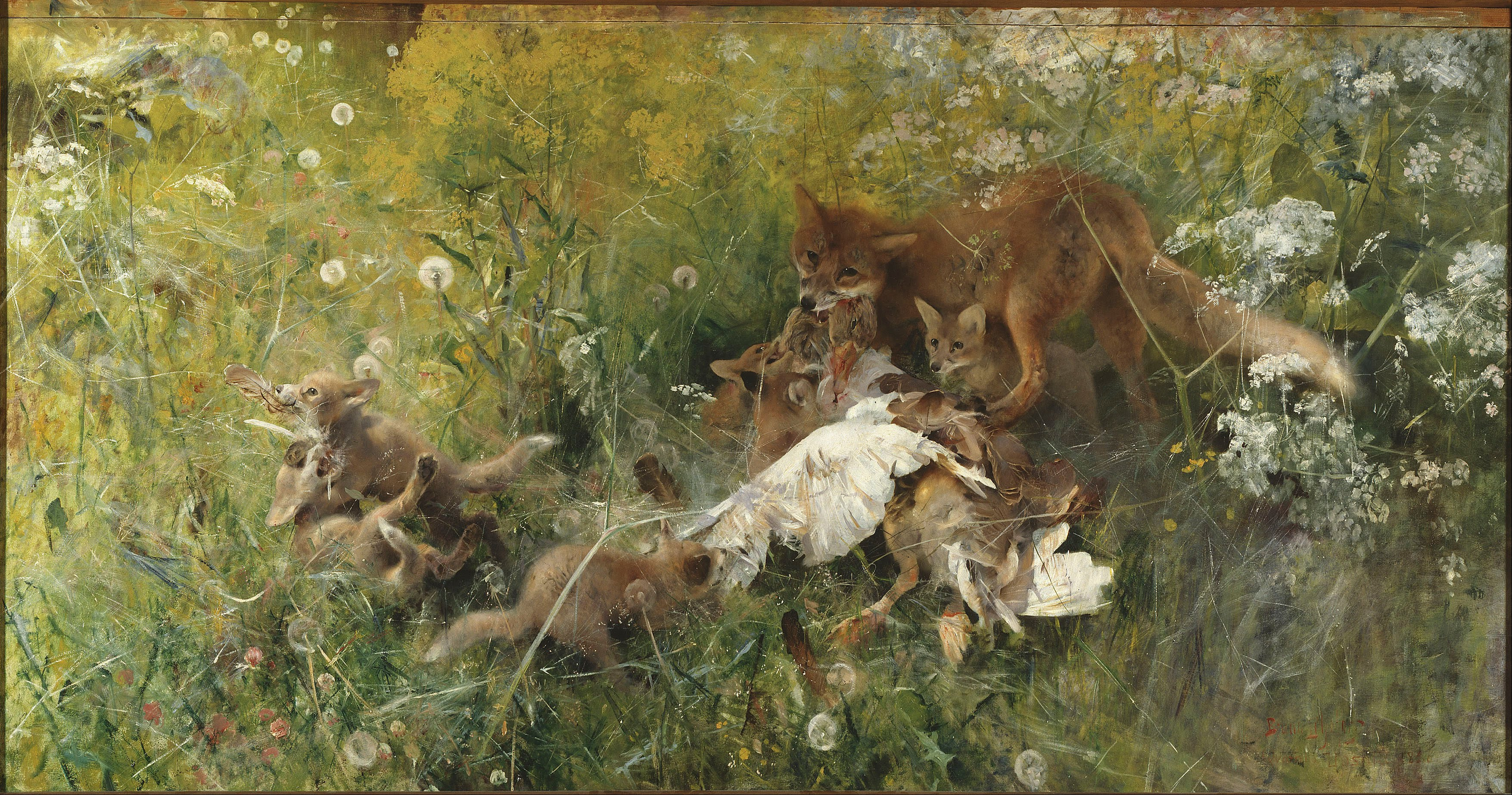
A fox family, 1886

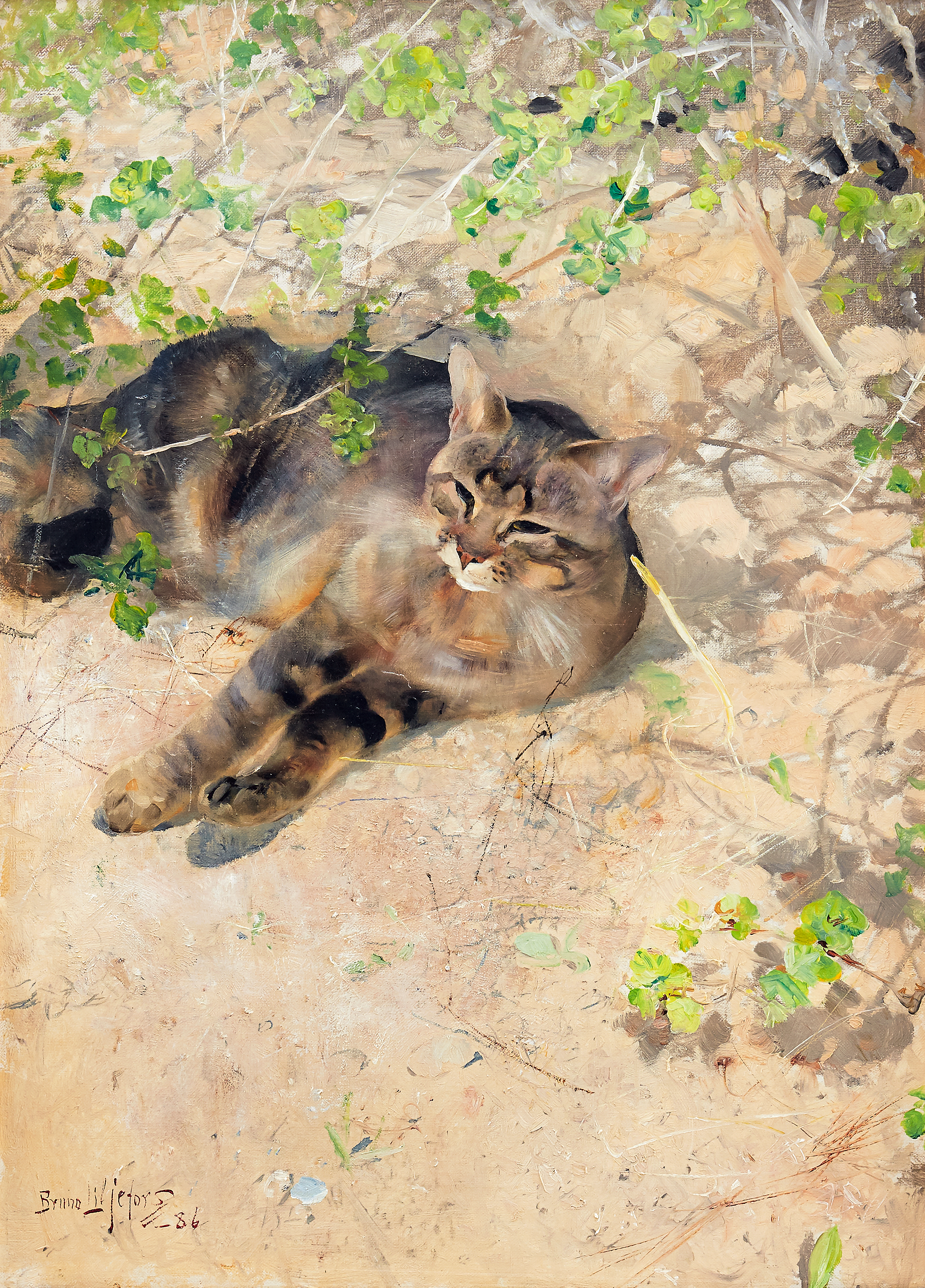
Sleeping Jeppe, 1886

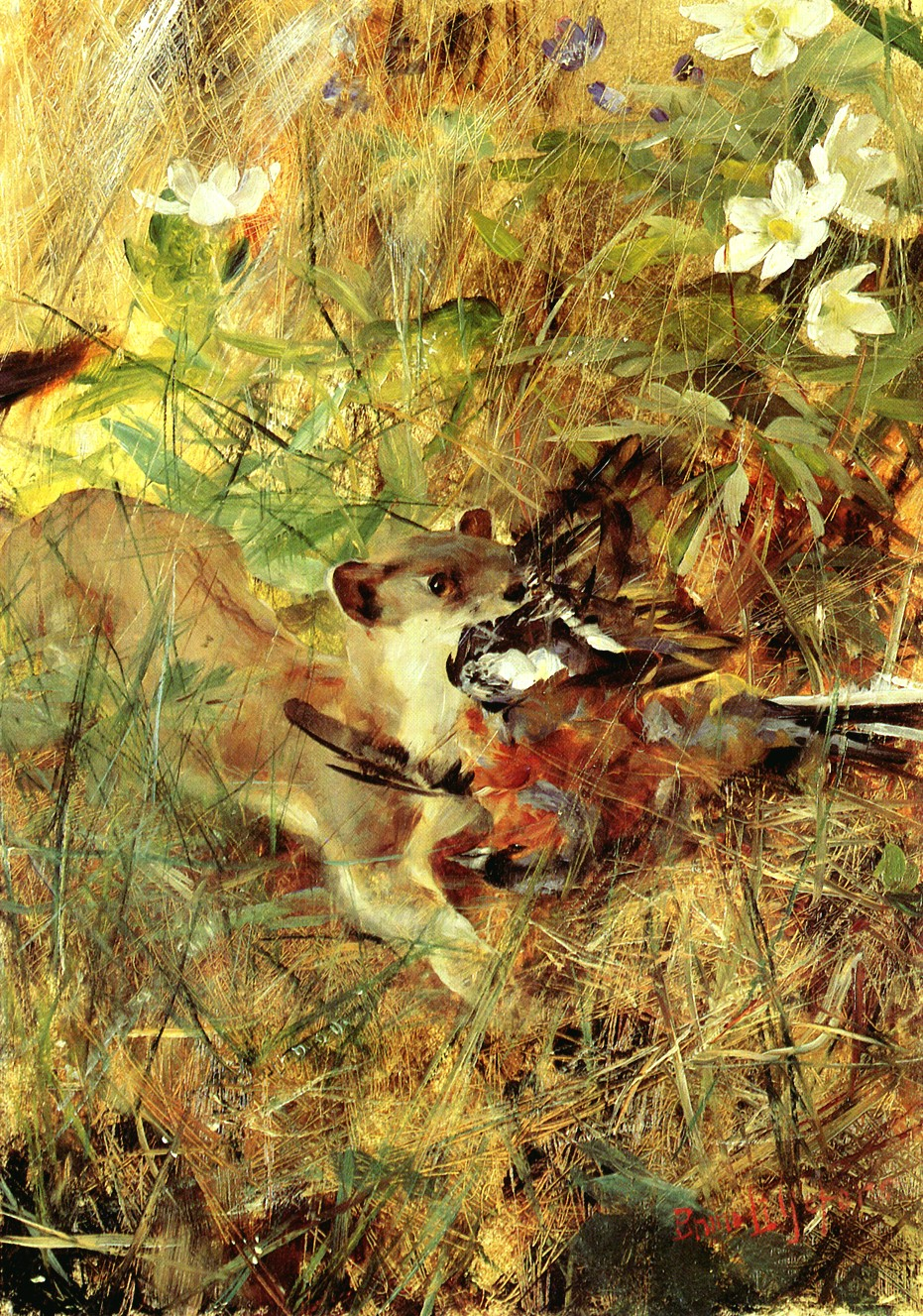
Weasel with Chaffinch, 1888

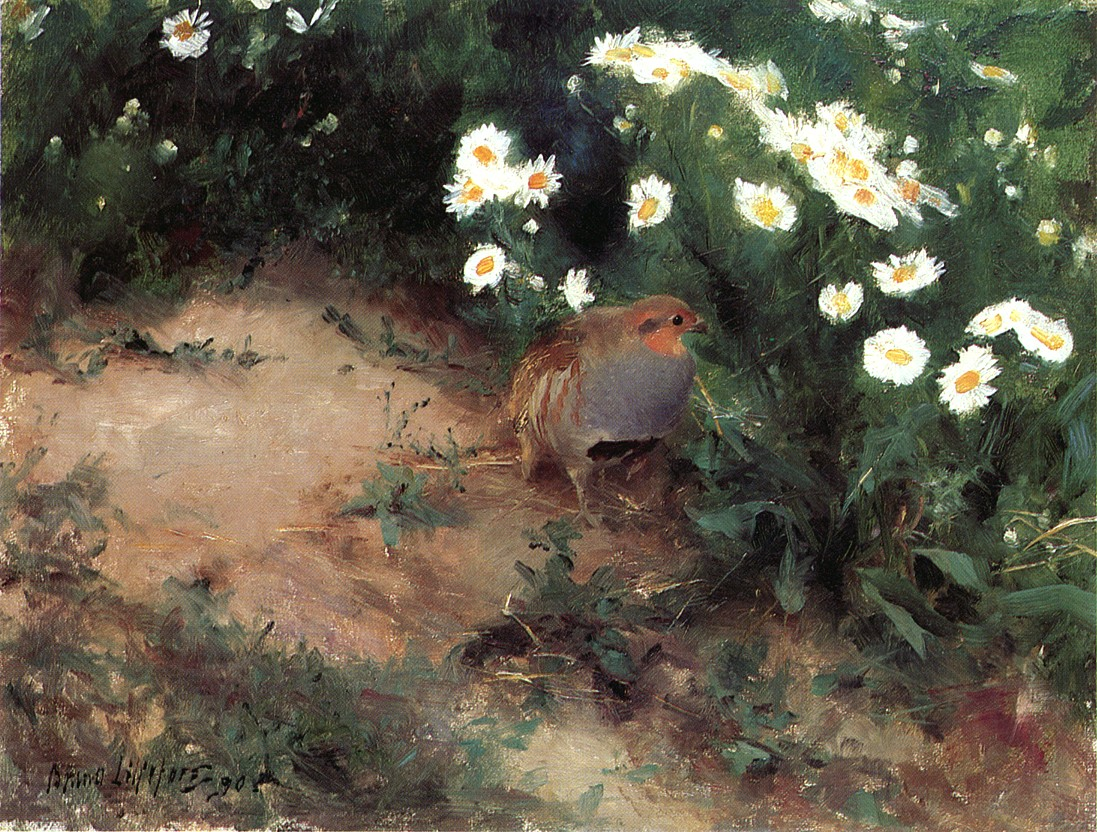
Partridge with daisies, 1890

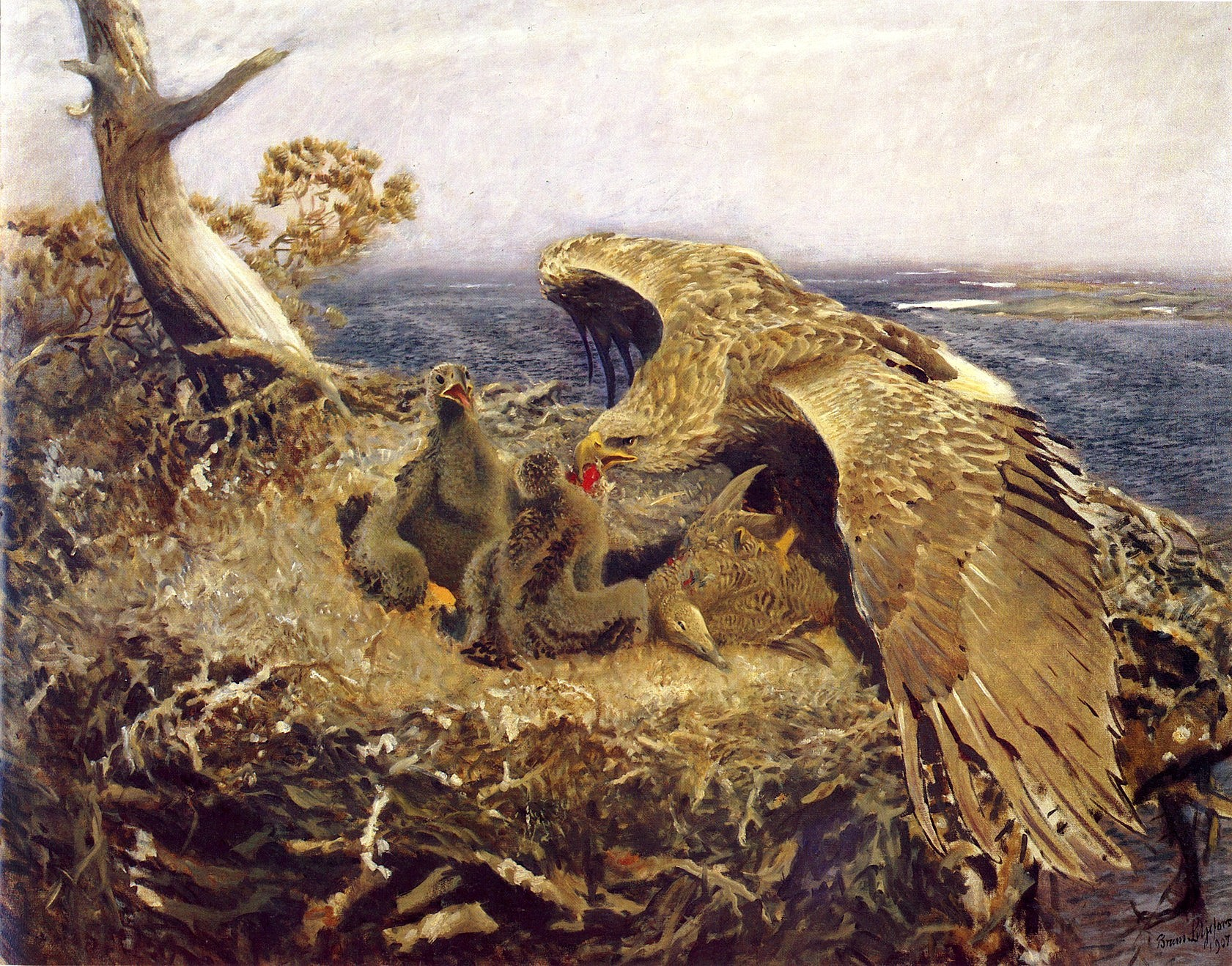
Sea eagle's nest, 1907

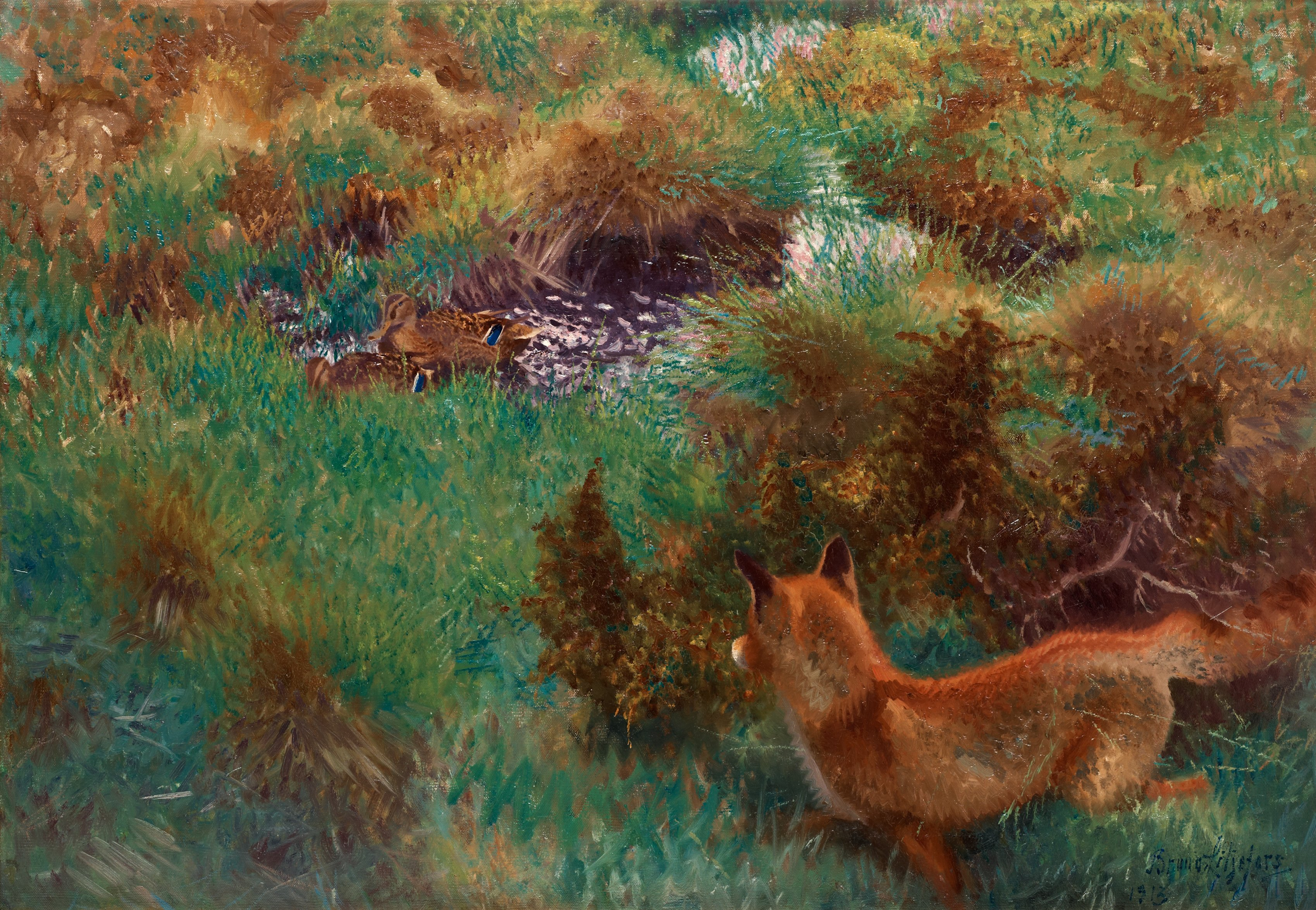
Fox stalking wild ducks, 1913

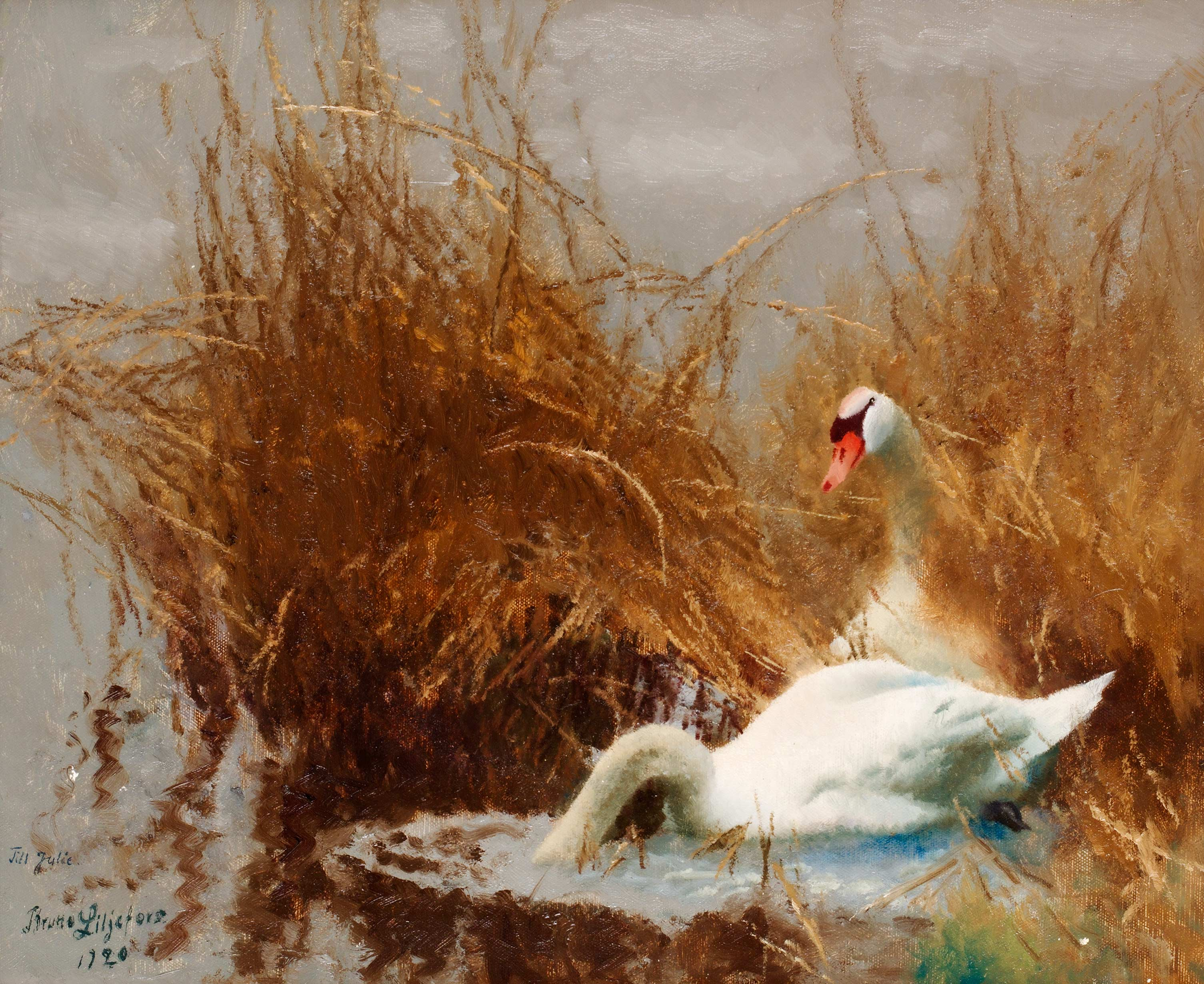
Swans, 1920

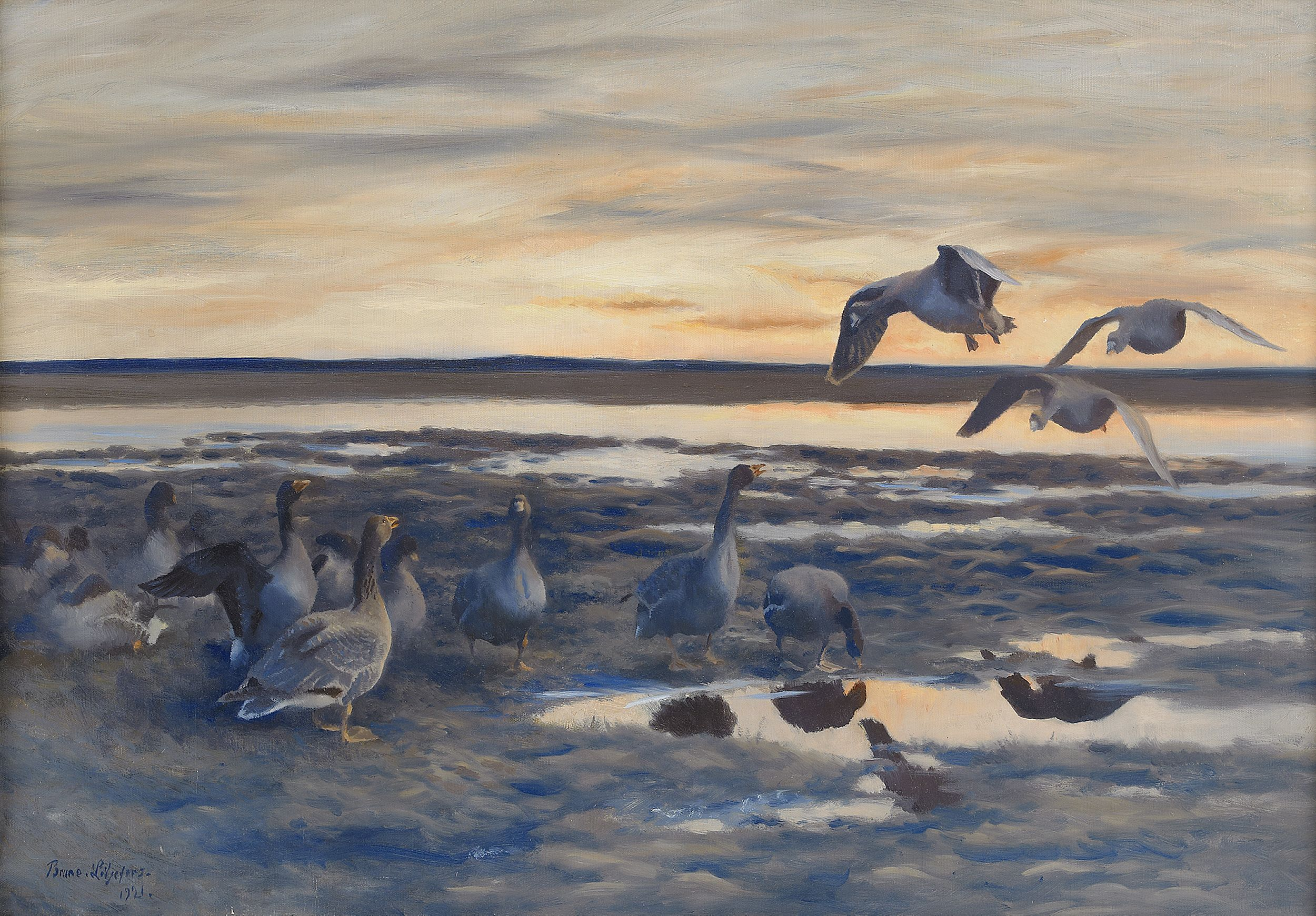
Bean geese shedding, 1921

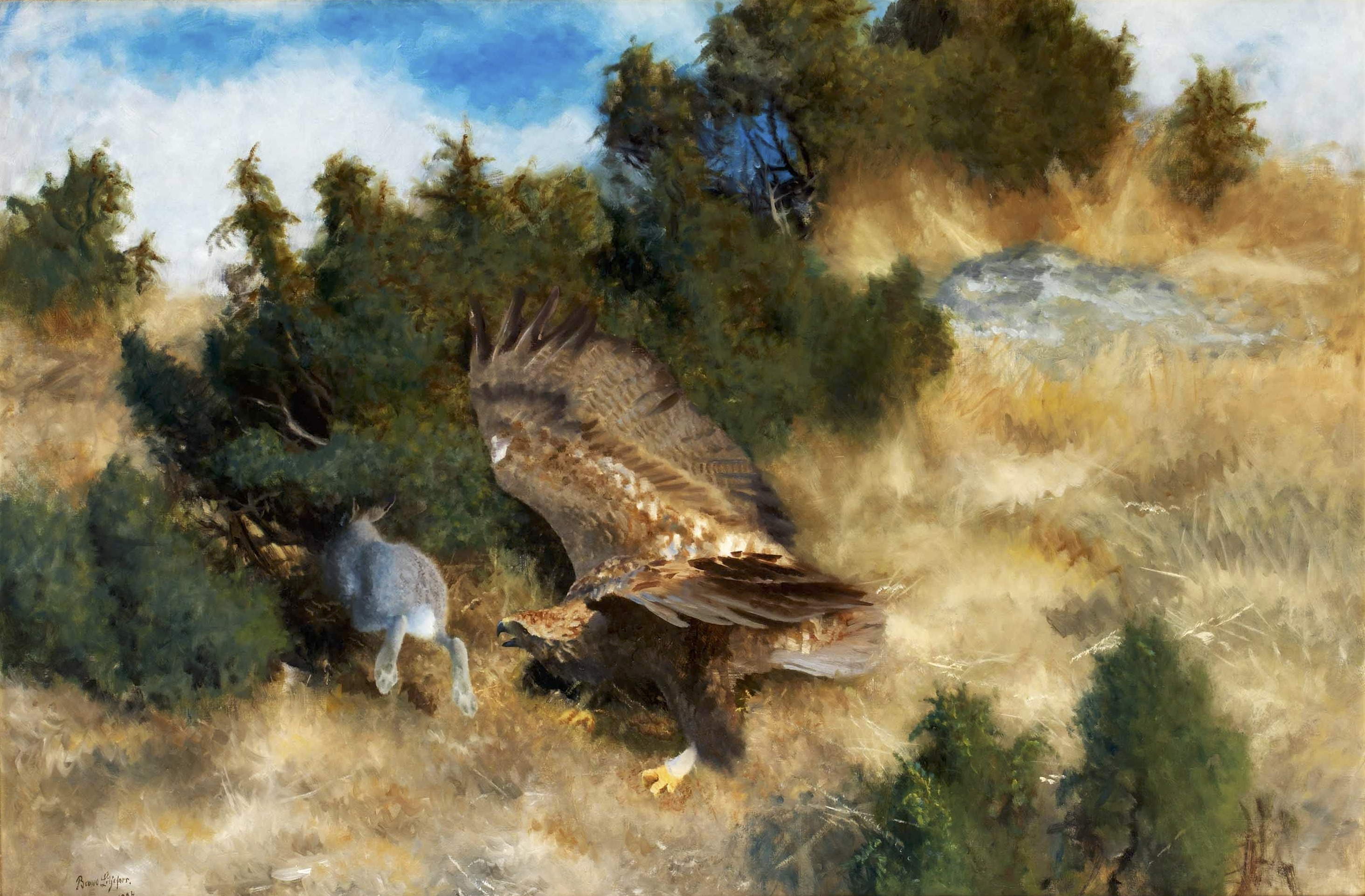
Eagle hunting hare, 1924

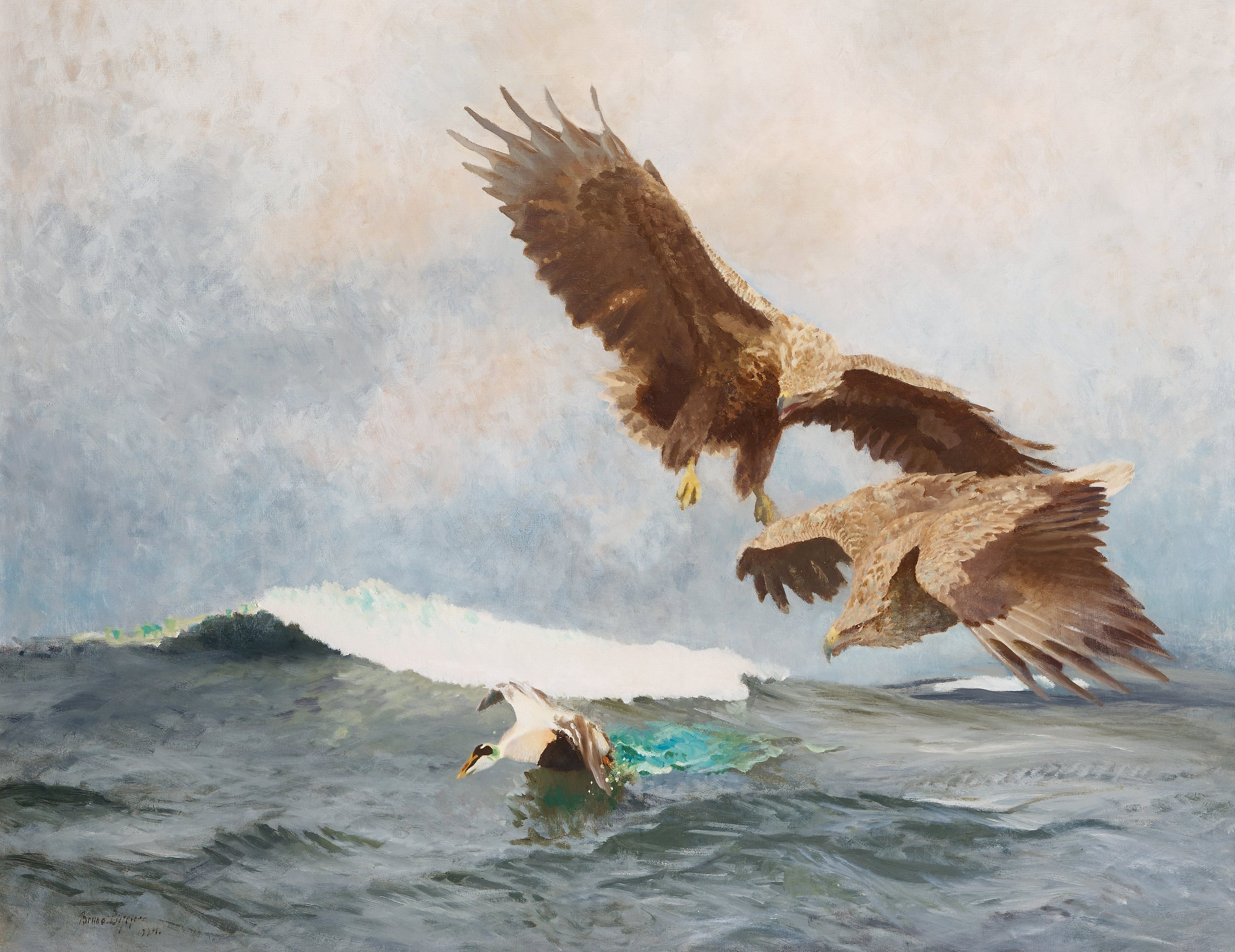
White-tailed eagles hunting, 1924

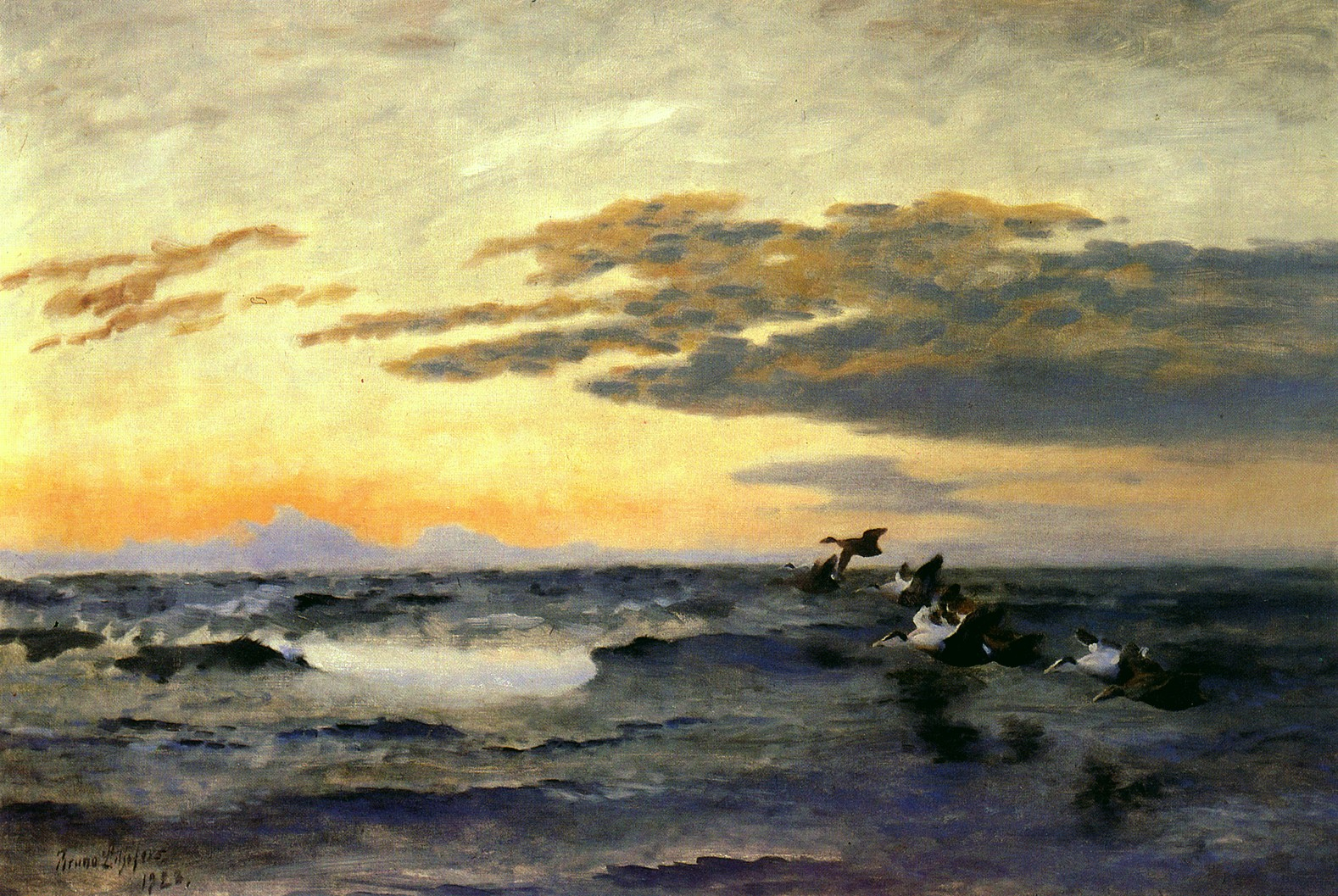
Eiders at sunrise, 1928

== Other sources ==
- Allan Ellenius (1996) Bruno Liljefors: Naturen som livsrum (Bonnier Alba) ISBN 978-9134517943
- Tor Harald Hedberg (2010) Bruno Liljefors (Nabu Press) ISBN 978-1149622391
- Martha Hill (1987) Bruno Liljefors the Peerless Eye (Doubleday) ISBN 978-0385243612
