= Swedish Open (disambiguation) =

Swedish Open is a tennis tournament.

Swedish Open may also refer to:

- Swedish Open (badminton)
- Swedish Open (table tennis)
- Swedish Open (squash)
- Swedish Open (darts)
