= SACC New York =

The Swedish-American Chamber of Commerce, Inc. (or SACC New York) is a non-profit corporation membership organization located in New York City. It was founded in 1906 and was the first Swedish-American Chamber of commerce in the United States (see United States Chamber of Commerce). SACC New York's mission is to promote, advance and protect direct commercial relations between the United States and Sweden in all possible areas while providing a broad spectrum of services to its members.

SACC New York's operations are made up of three core areas: membership, events, and business services. As a membership organization SACC New York is based around its members. The member companies are from both Sweden and the U.S. and represent large as well as small companies. SACC New York regularly organizes a large selection of events. Events are mainly for the members, but are often open for anyone to join. They include seminars, luncheons, conferences, and galas. SACC New York's consulting practice is known as Business Services.

Their services include regional development programs, industry and trend reports, export consulting and training, business relations and speaker engagements. Business Services also publishes Information Booklets that cover fundamentals of transatlantic business.
