= Västra Hoby Church =

Church in Lund Municipality, Sweden

Coordinates: 55°47′09.92″N 13°10′04.85″E

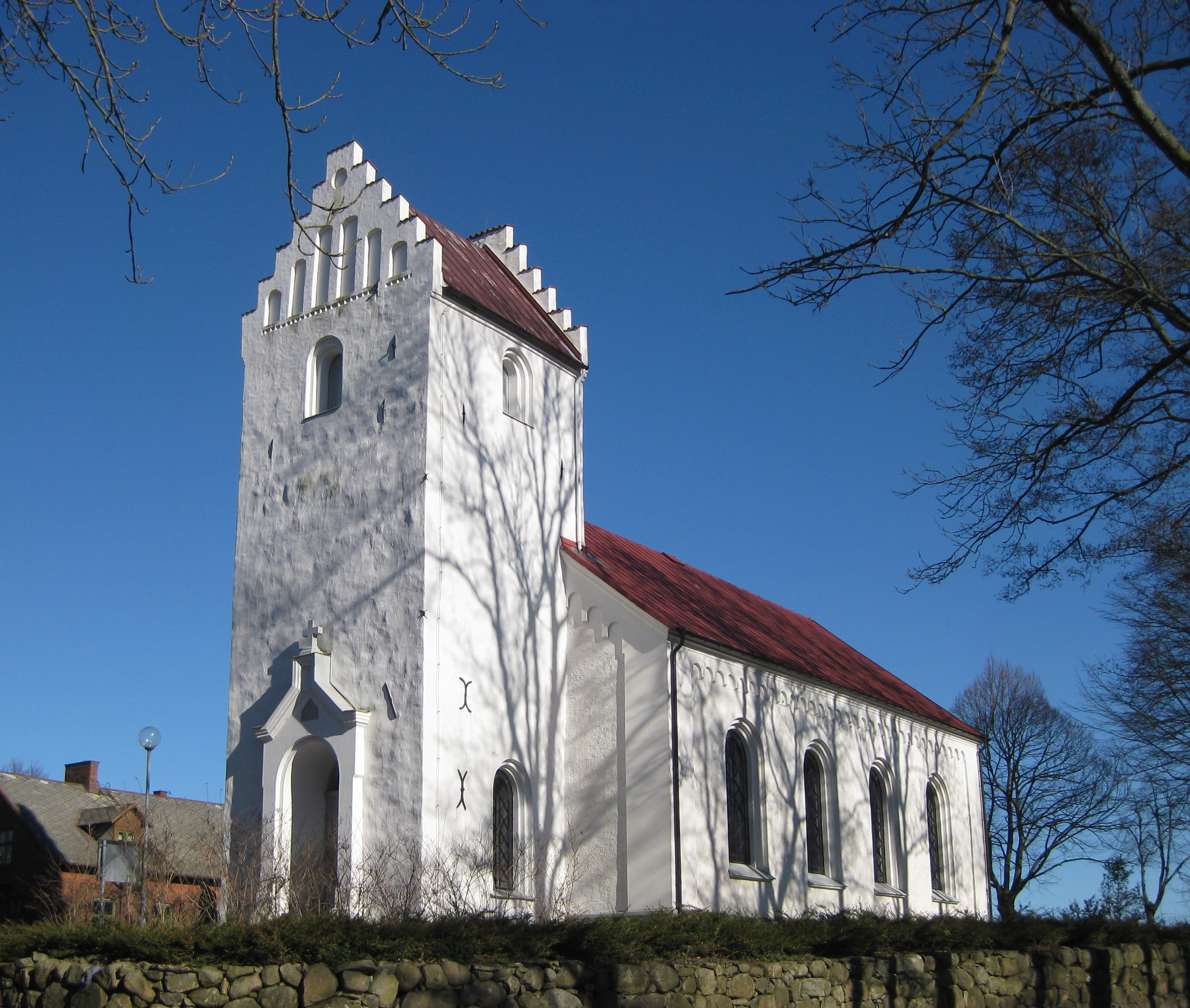
Västra Hoby kyrka

Västra Hoby Church (Västra Hoby kyrka) is a church in Lund Municipality, Sweden. The church is in the parish of Torns of the Diocese of Lund.

== History ==
Most of the church was built in 1886 after most of the previous church had been demolished. The tower from the 15th century was preserved.

On a wall in the back of the church room there is a reredos from the 15th century. It was stored at the Kulturen museum of cultural history in Lund, but has now been moved back to Västra Hoby Church. The reredos is divided into 19 fields. The first nine fields show the childhood of Jesus. The tenth field is much larger than the others and shows the crucifixion of Jesus. The last nine fields show the Story of the Passion.

The baptismal font is made of sandstone and was made in the Middle Ages. The altarpiece is a copy of a Carl Bloch-painting made in 1886 by Hjalmar Berggren. In 2002 the present church organ was moved from Odarslöv Church which was deconsecrated in 2004. Odarslöv Church was consecrated on November 14. It has 528 pipes and was made by Eskil Lundin in 1904. Before the vintage organ was installed, the church had a modern organ made in 1966 by Mårtenssons orgelfabrik.
