= Helmer Osslund =

Swedish painter (1866–1938)

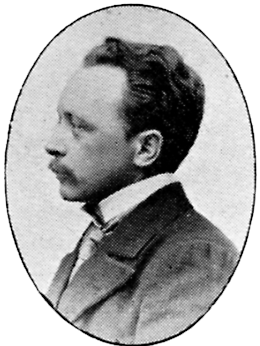
Helmer Osslund, from the Svenskt Porträttgalleri XX

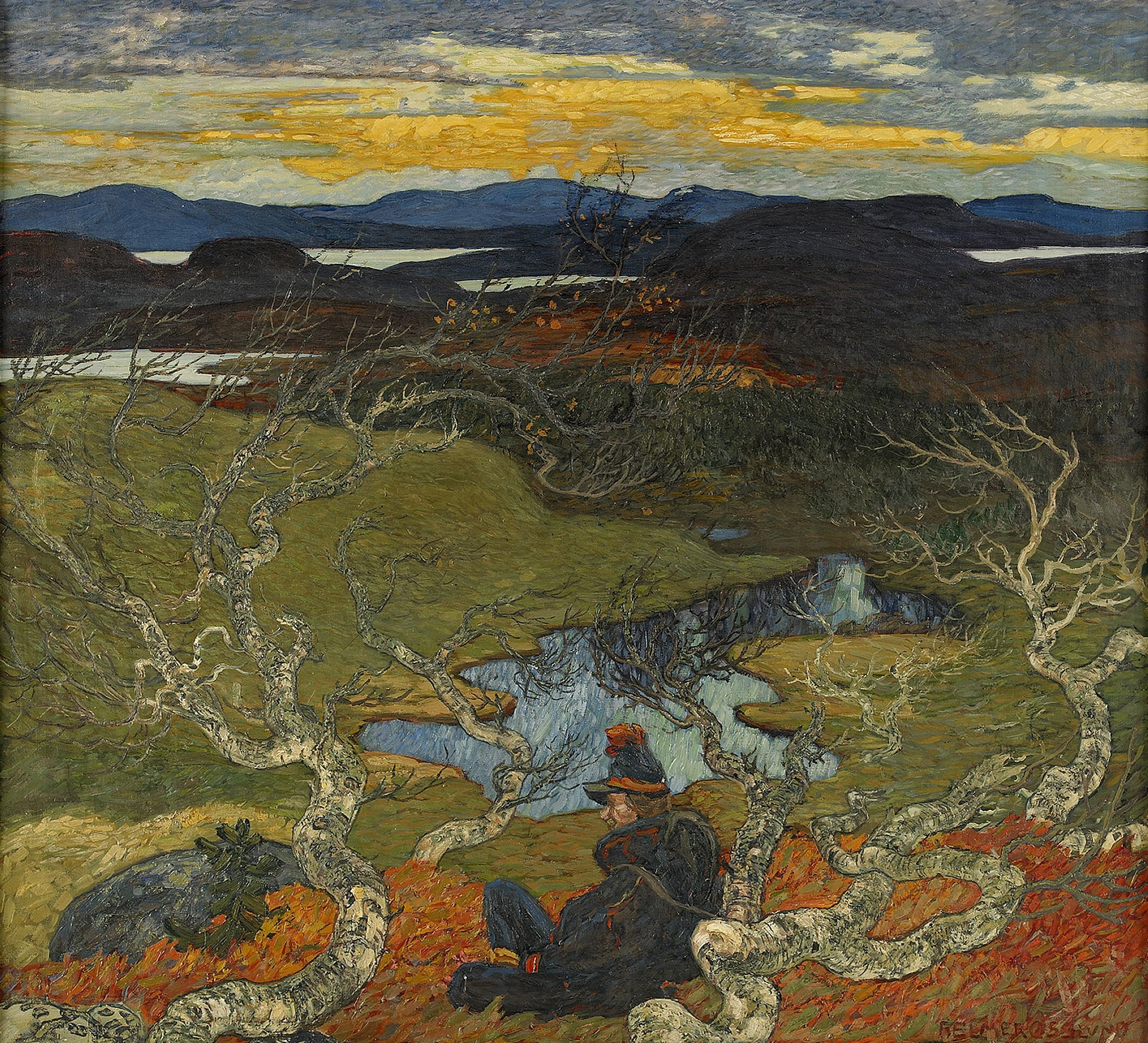
Evening near Kiruna

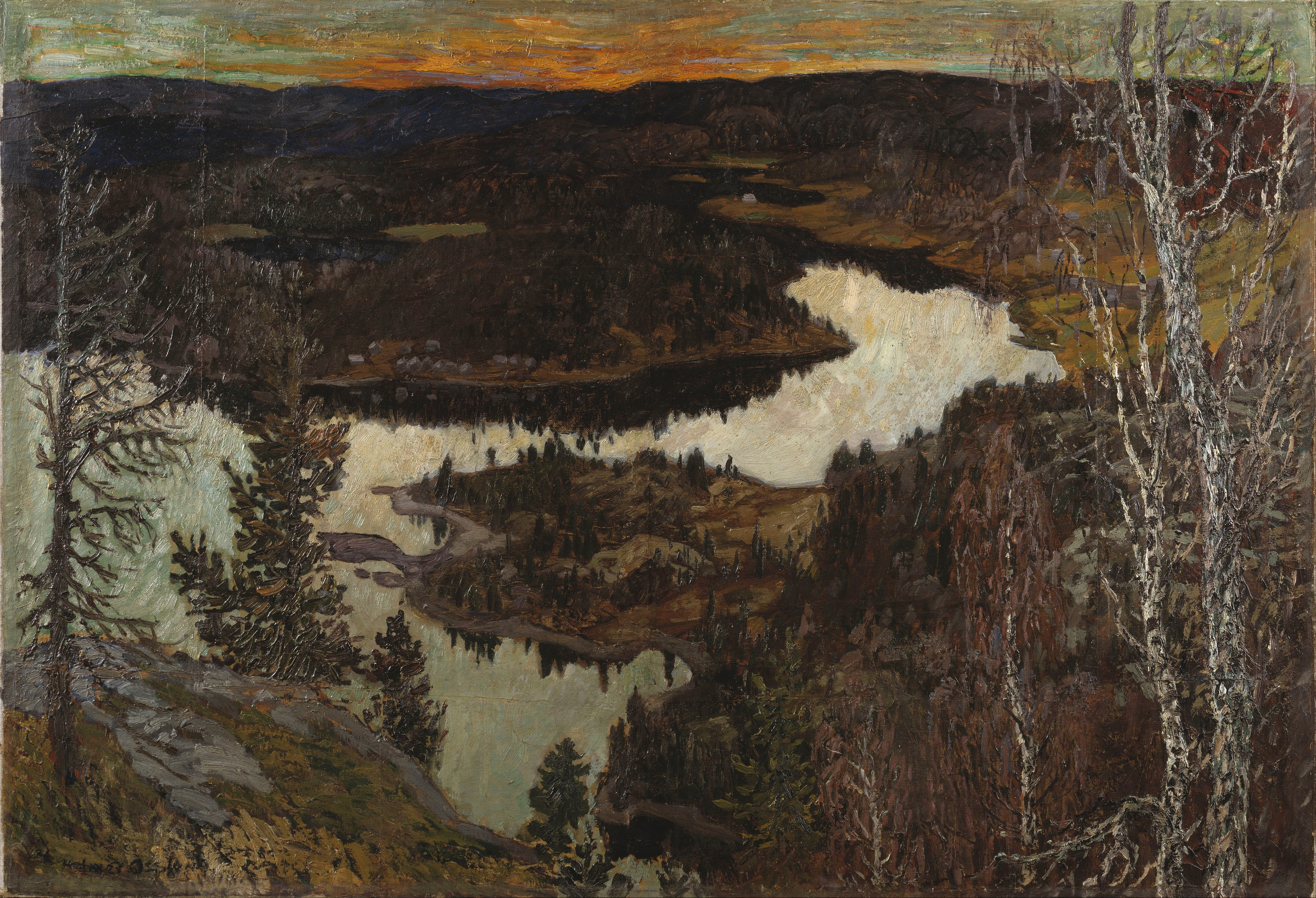
Autumn

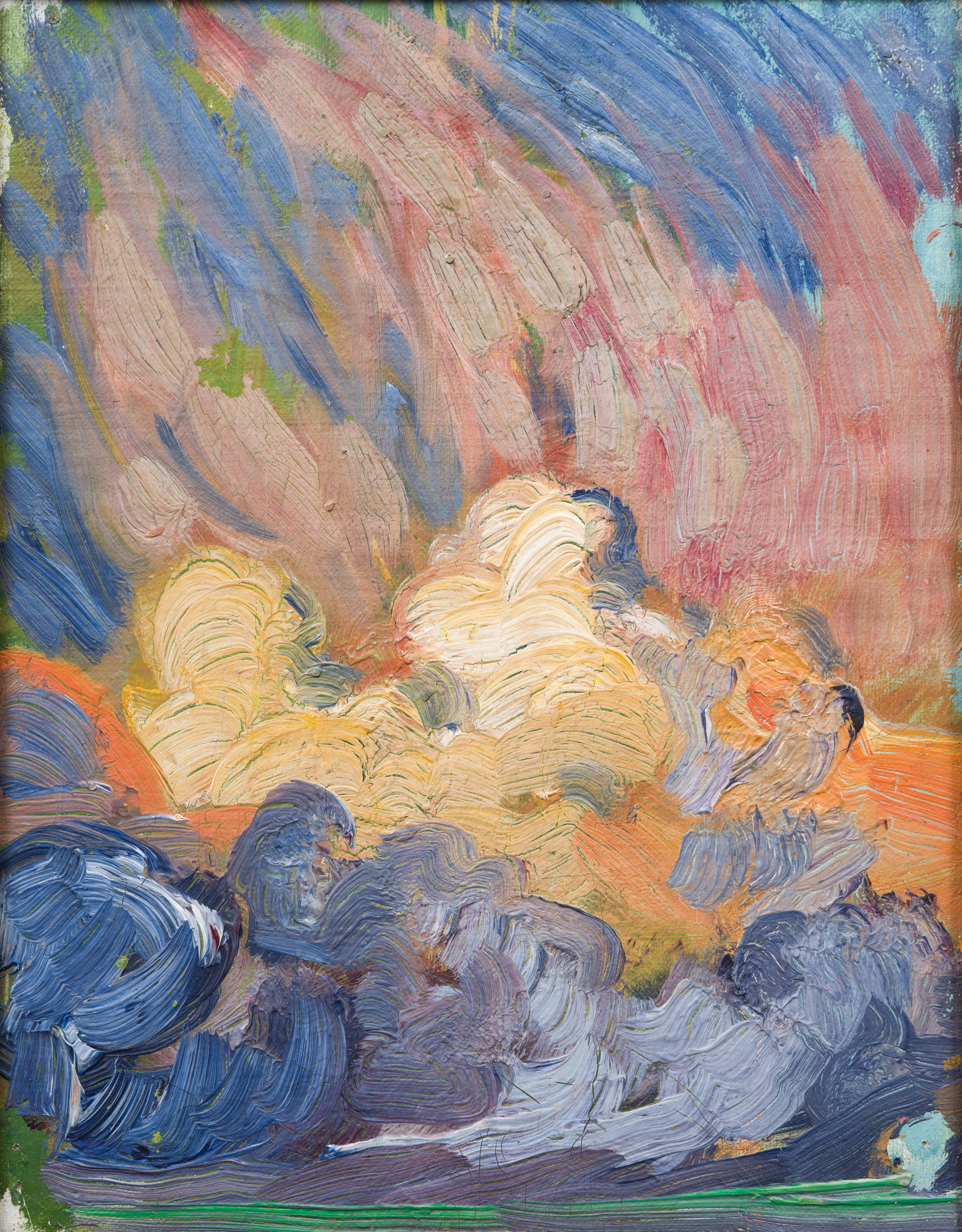
Clouds, 1921

Jonas Helmer Osslund, originally Åslund (22 September 1866, in Tuna Parish, Medelpad – 11 July 1938, in Stockholm) was a Swedish painter. He specialized in motifs from Lappland and often painted on greaseproof paper.

== Biography ==
His father, Daniel (1826–1885), was a painter of some local note. His brother, Elis, was also a painter and his half-sister, Frida was an author. He changed his name from Åslund to Osslund when he lived in America, to make the correct pronunciation more obvious.

After his basic education, he attended the Umeå högre allmänna läroverk (secondary school), then moved to the United States to study engineering. At the age of twenty, he began painting and was employed by the Gustavsberg Porcelain Factory. In 1890, they paid for a study trip to Paris. Rather than return, he quit his job and began taking lessons at the Académie Colarossi in 1894. He also absorbed Symbolism from lessons from Paul Gauguin and worked with Jens Ferdinand Willumsen. Eventually, he ran out of money and had to go home in 1897.

On arriving, his friend, Georg J:son Karlin, found employment for him at Höganäs AB. He stayed for only six months, producing over seventy designs, most of which were never put into production. It was then that he developed his personal style of landscape painting. His first trip to the northern wilderness came in 1898. He used greaseless paper, which was cheaper and easier to handle than canvas; a method he had learned from Gauguin. His works, in their turn, influenced a young painter named Leander Engström.

In 1906, he held a major exhibition at the City Hall in Gävle. Three of his paintings were purchased by the leather manufacturer (later Consul) Emil Matton (1866–1957), whose sister Ida was a well known sculptor. At a subsequent exhibition the following year, Matton ordered a set of paintings representing the four seasons. When his manor house was demolished in 1979, "Autumn" was acquired by the Nationalmuseum and is one of Osslund's best known works. The other three are in private collections.

For many years, he maintained a summer residence and studio in Granvåg, near Sollefteå. After 1923, his regular home was in Sundsvall. During his last years, he suffered from an unspecified nervous ailment that made it difficult to paint. He was interred at the local cemetery. His personal papers are in the collection of the Umeå University Library. His works may be seen at the Nationalmuseum, Göteborgs konstmuseum, and the Göteborgs stadsmuseum.

His work was part of the painting event in the art competition at the 1932 Summer Olympics.
