= Skårby Church =

Coordinates: 55°29′11″N 13°42′48″E

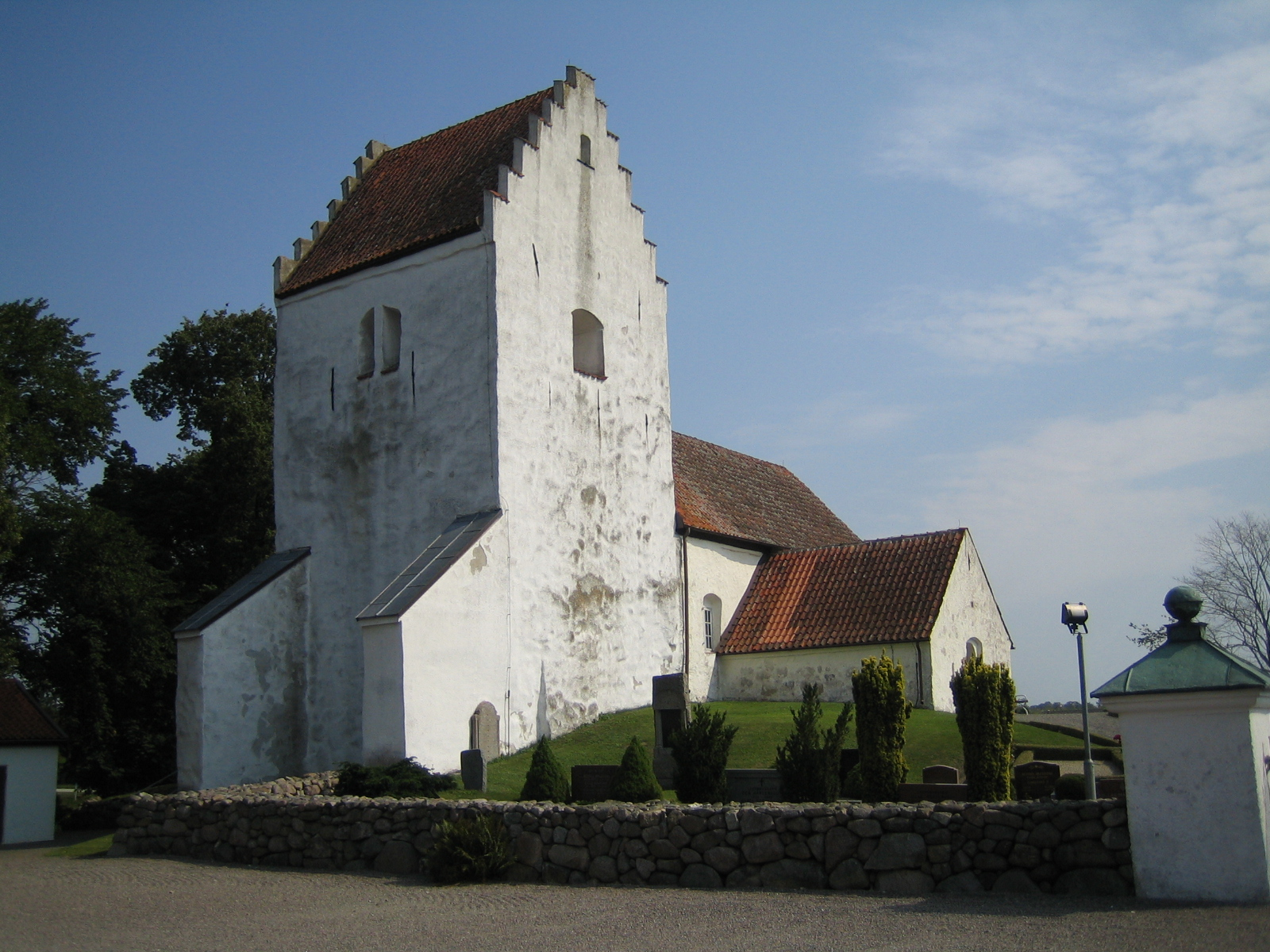
Skårby Church, external view

Skårby Church (Swedish: Skårby kyrka) is a medieval Lutheran church north-west of Ystad, Sweden. It belongs to the Diocese of Lund.

== History ==
Skårby Church is mentioned in written sources for the first time in 1145. Adjacent to the church is one of the so-called Skårby Runestones; the other runestone was originally located in the church wall but has been moved to Kulturen, a museum in Lund.

In 1787, plans were made by a local aristocrat to replace the church, together with two others, with a single, large church. The new church, Marsvinsholm Church, was not built until 1867, however. The church congregation resisted the idea and managed to strike a deal with the baron, who refrained from demolishing the church. However, after Marsvinsholm Church was built Skårby Church was used less frequently and fell into disrepair. It was not until 1934 that it was renovated and reinstated as a parish church.

== Architecture ==
The core of the church, i.e. the nave and choir, is Romanesque in style and dates from the first half of the 12th century, or possibly even earlier. During the 14th century, vaults were installed in the choir and the church possibly enlarged towards the west. At the end of the 15th century, late-Gothic vaults were installed also in the nave. From this period the church porch may also date. The tower is probably from the 16th century. A number of buttresses supporting the church may date from the 16th or 17th century. In the 18th century, the church was enlarged with an extension that comprises more than a third of the volume of the church.

The church is decorated internally with murals from two different periods: one set dated circa 1300–1350 in the choir, and another dated circa 1480 in the nave. The murals were renovated in 1934 and again in 1969. The church also has some medieval furnishings: two Romanesque baptismal fonts and an altar chalice from the early 16th century, as well as, possibly, the wooden front door.

Incorporated in a wooden gallery of the church, the only known medieval rood screen in Sweden has been discovered. It has been dated to 1485–6. It is currently in the Lund University Historical Museum.

Other furnishings are of later date. The altarpiece is painted by an artist from nearby Ystad and dated 1734. The pulpit is from 1742. The church also has some iron candlesticks from the 16th century.
