= Dagstorp Runestone =

Memorial used in the viking age

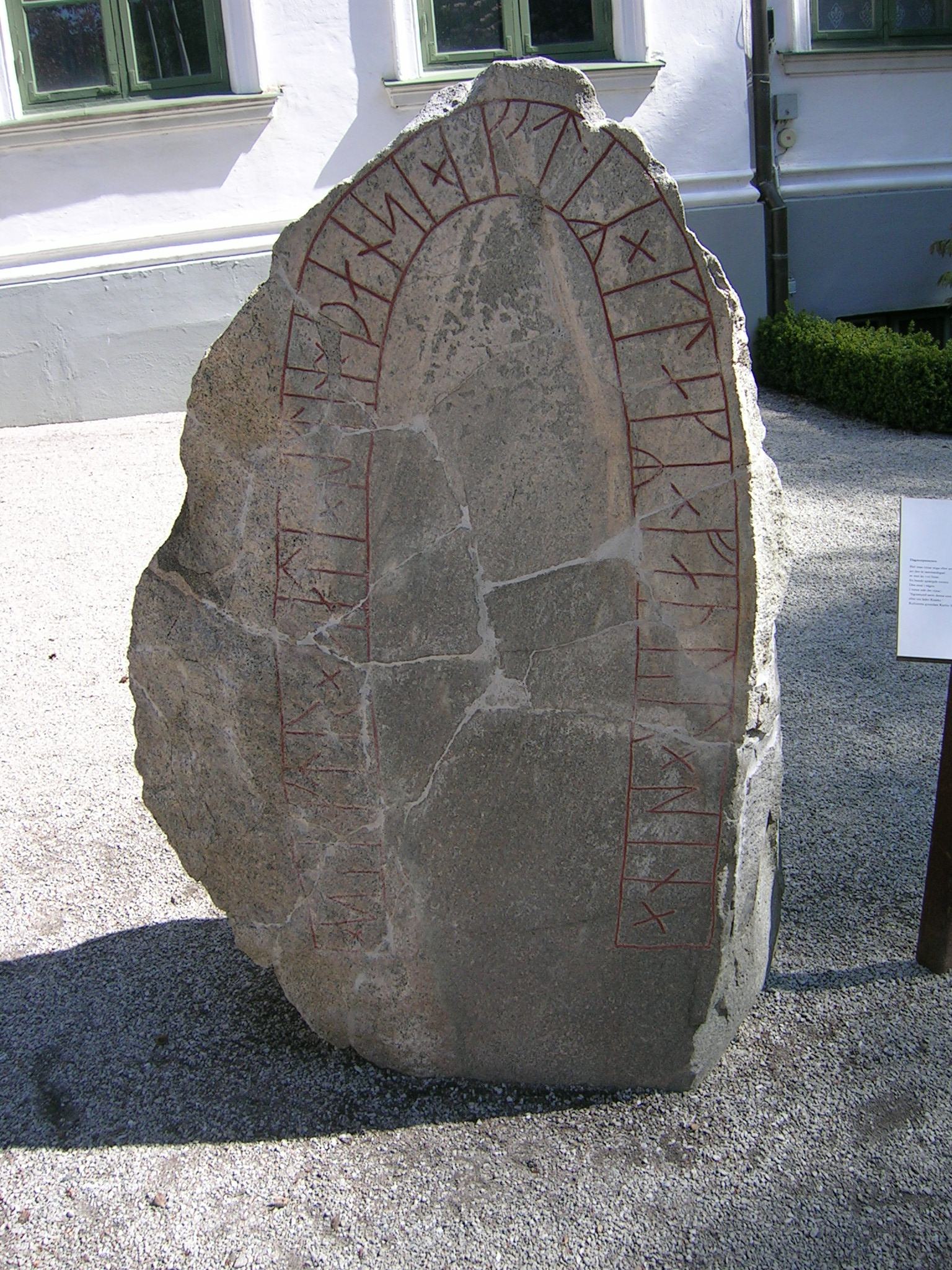
The reconstructed Dagstorp Runestone.

The Dagstorp Runestone, designated as DR 325 in the Rundata catalog, is a Viking Age memorial runestone that was discovered at Dagstorp, which is about two kilometers northwest of Kävlinge, Scania, Sweden.

== Description ==
This granite runestone, which is 1.58 meters in height, was discovered in 1910 by a farmer broken into 104 pieces in a mound in Dagstorp. The Dagstorp Runestone was reconstructed in 1929 and is currently located at the Kulturen in Lund where it is known as the Dagstorpsten. The inscription consists of runic text within a band that forms an arch. This inscription is classified as being carved in runestone style RAK. This is the classification for those inscriptions where the ends of the runic bands are straight and do not have any attached serpent or beast heads. RAK is considered to be the oldest style. The runic text is carved in the younger futhark and indicates that the stone is a memorial placed by a man named Sigmundr in memory of his father Klakkr. The runemaster, who did not sign the inscription, used a punctuation mark × between each word in the text.

This inscription is dated as having been carved after the Jelling stones.

== Inscription ==
=== Transliteration of the runes into Latin characters ===
× si(k)mtr × sati × stin × þansi × iftiʀ × klakʀ × faþur × sin ×

=== Transcription into Old Norse ===
Sigmundr satti sten þænsi æftiʀ Klakkʀ(?), faþur sin.

=== Translation in English ===
Sigmundr placed this stone in memory of Klakkr(?), his father.
