= Leander Engström =

Swedish painter

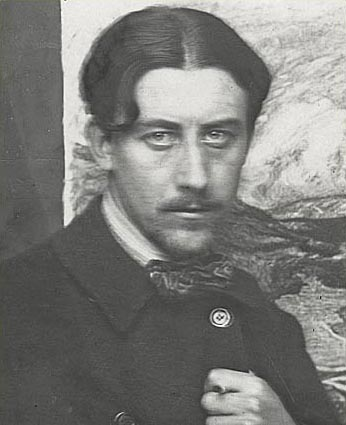
Leander Engström

Per Leander Engström, sometimes denoted as The Elder (27 February 1886 – 6 February 1927) was a Swedish painter. He specialized in portraits and colorful wilderness scenes in the Expressionist style.

== Biography ==
Engström was born in 1886 in Ytterhogdal, Sweden. After attending the elementary school in Ljustorp, his family moved to Sundsvall, where he worked in a sawmill until he was fourteen. In 1901, he became an assistant at the local newspaper and joined a group of amateur artists headed by Helmer Osslund.

Thanks to financial support from Karl Nordström, he was able to begin studies at the Artist's Association School (Konstnärförbundets skola), from 1907 to 1908, then went to Paris, where he took lessons from Henri Matisse. He remained there until 1912. Back in Sweden, he was one of the first members of a short-lived group called "De Unga" (The Young), which applied Expressionist techniques to Swedish motifs. In 1914, he had a successful showing at the Baltic Exhibition.

For much of his life, he travelled through the mountains of Norrland, painting en plein aire. He built a small house in Abisko, one of his favorite locations. During the 1920s, he spent time in Italy: living in Florence from 1920 to 1923. In between, he created paintings on the ceiling of the Skandia-Teatern, an early movie theater in Stockholm.

In 1913, he married Maria Edlund and, the following year, had twin sons, Kjell Leander and Tord Leander, who both became painters.

He died at the age of forty-one in Stockholm, after a long period of poor health, and was buried at the Skogskyrkogården, south of Stockholm.

His works may be seen at the Moderna Museet, Nationalmuseum, Prins Eugens Waldemarsudde, and the Gothenburg Museum of Art.

== Selected paintings ==
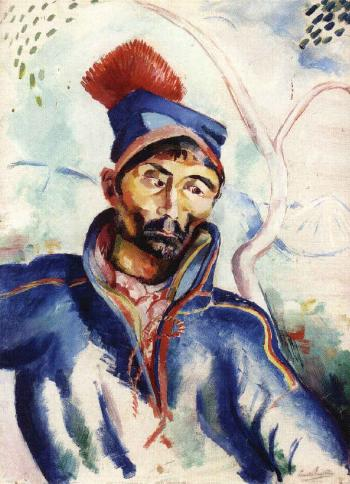
Lapplander

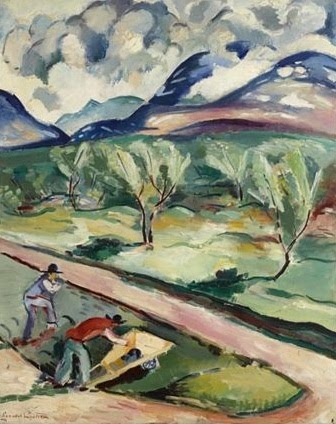
Orchard with Workers

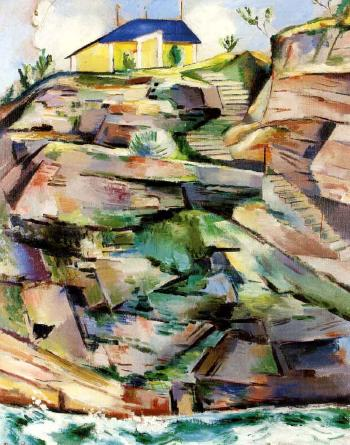
The House on the Cliff

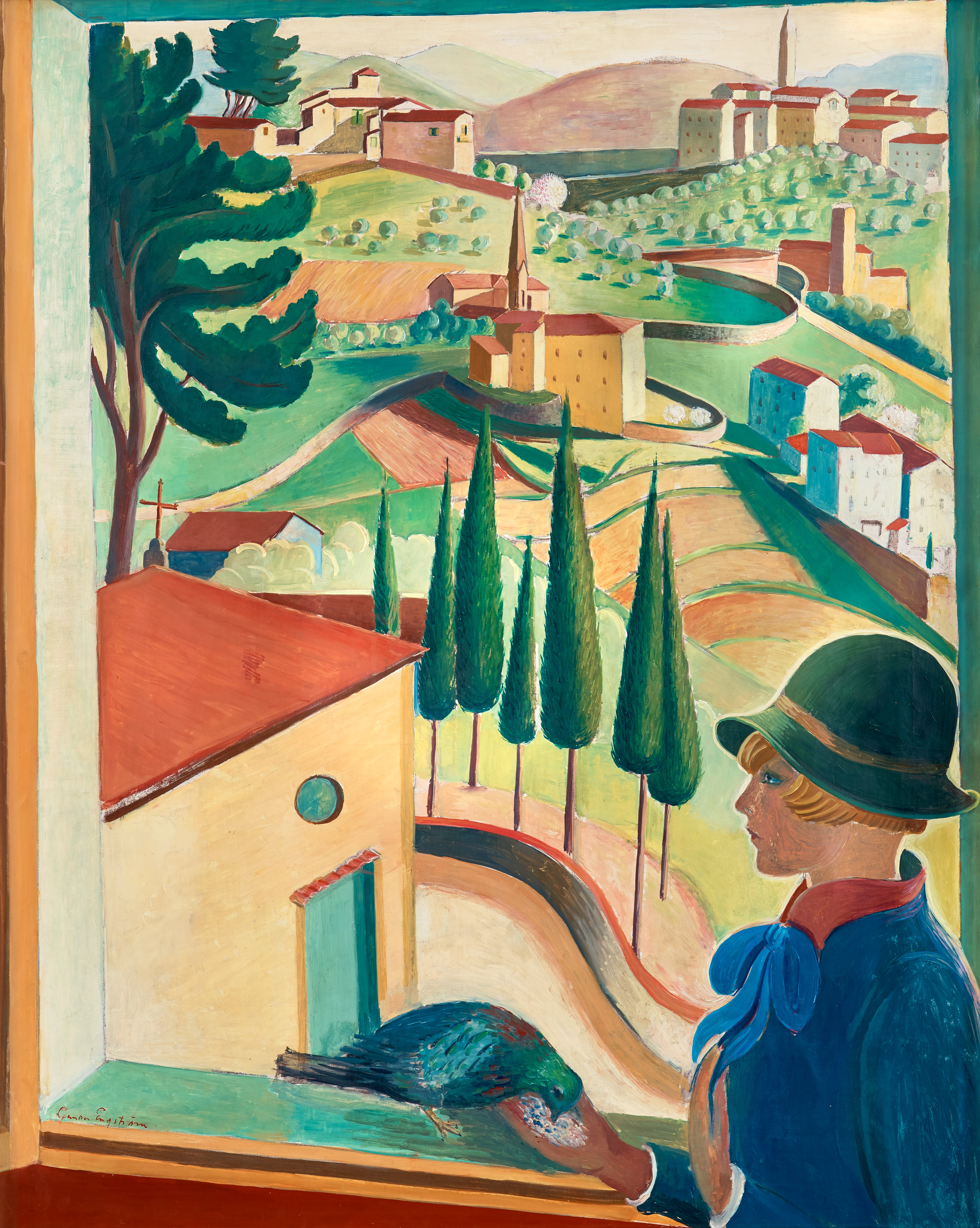
The Devout Boy

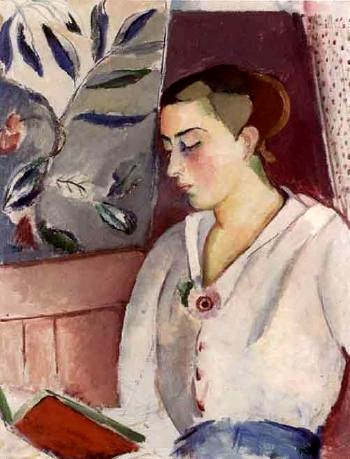
Girl with Book

== Other sources ==
- Svenska Dagbladets årsbok - 1927, red. Erik Rudberg & Edvin Hellblom, Åhlén & Åkerlunds Boktryckeri, Stockholm 1928 pg.242
- Sveriges befolkning 1900, (CD-ROM version 1.02) Sveriges Släktforskarförbund, 2006
