= Dalby Runestone =

Coordinates: 55.70458°N 13.1962°E

- Dalbystenen
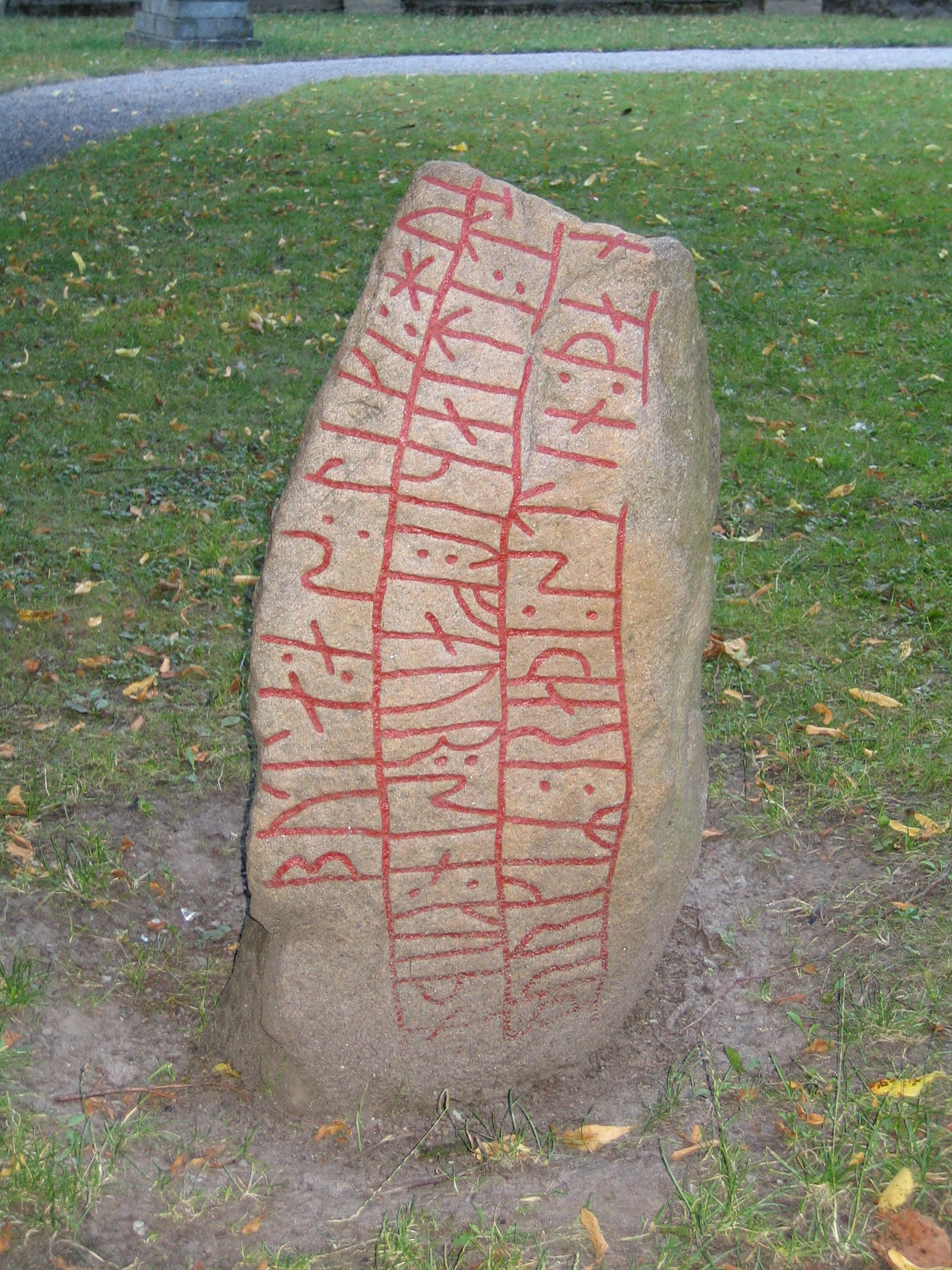
- Created: 10th century
- Discovered: Lund, Scania, Sweden (formerly Denmark)
- Rundata ID: DR 298
- Style: RAK

Text – Native
- Old Norse : See article.

Translation
- See article.

The Dalby Runestone, previously called the Sjöstorp Stone, DR 298, is a runestone from Dalby in Scania, Sweden. Today, the stone is located outside the Kulturen museum in Lund. The stone was carved during the Viking Age, and is made of granite. The style, with straight, vertical bands of runes, is called RAK.

== Inscription ==
A transliteration of the inscription is as follows:

þurkiʀ : raþi : stin : þan... (:) at : itinkil : faur : sin : kuþn : buta : as : liki/lik i/ : hu(k)(-)(-)

Normalized:

Þorgeirr reisti stein þenn[a] at Steinkel, fôður sinn, góðan bónda, er lengi/liggr í/ .../haug[i].

Modern Norwegian:

Þorgeir reiste denne sten etter Stenkil, hans far, en god bonde, som lenge/ligger i/ ... haugen.

English:

Þorgeirr raised this stone in memory of Steinkell, his father, a good husbandman, who long / lies in ... mound.
