= Skårby Runestones =

Coordinates: 55.7046°N 13.1962°E

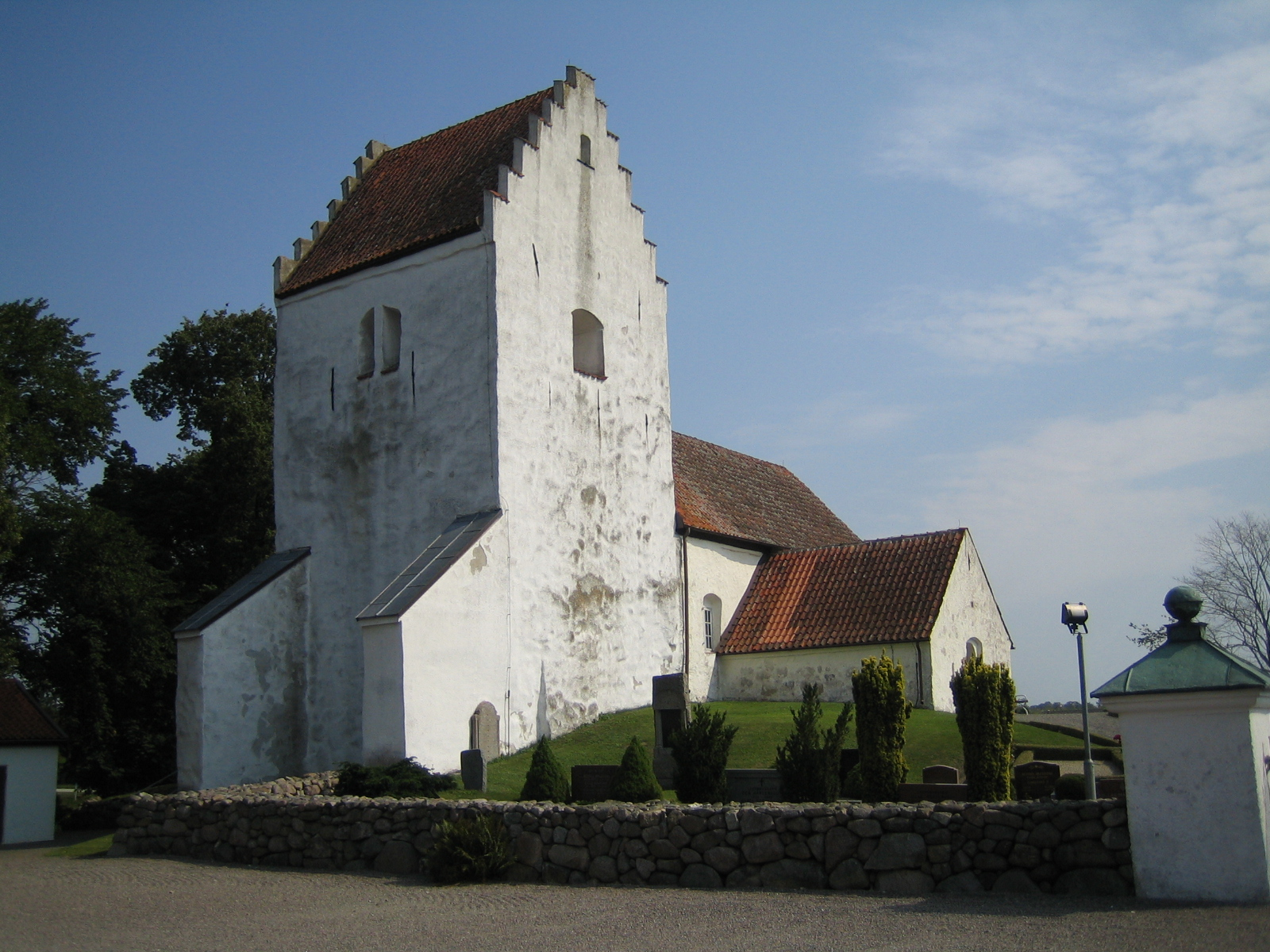
Skårby Church, Scania, Sweden, where the runestones were originally located.

The Skårby Runestones are two Viking Age memorial runestones originally located in Skårby, which is about ten kilometers northwest of Ystad, Scania, Sweden.

== Skårby 1 ==
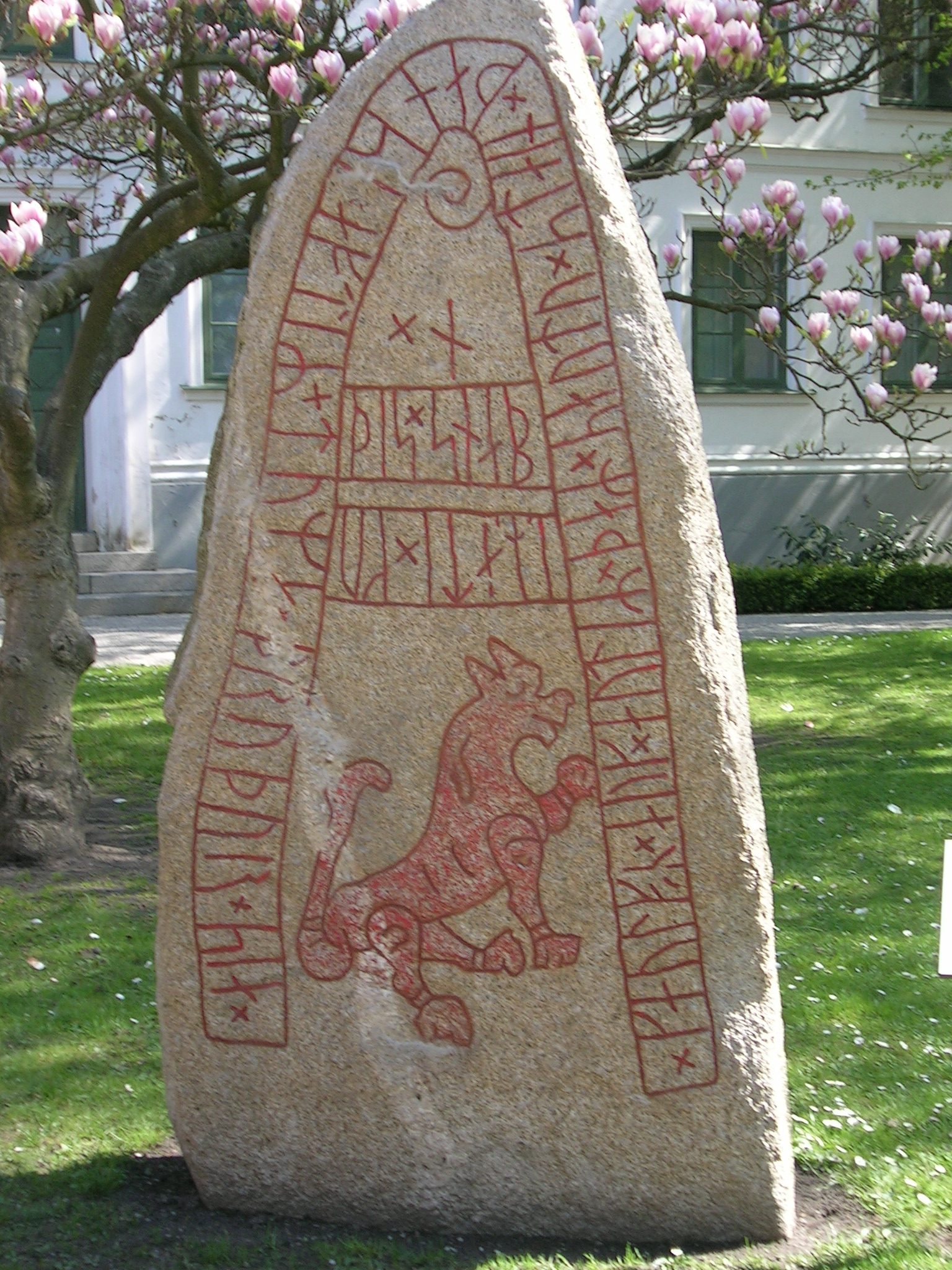
The Skårby 1 runestone.

The Skårby 1 runestone contains runic text within a band along the outside of the stone and in two interior sections. The stone is 2.6 meters in height and is made of granite. The stone is notable for the beast in the center of the inscription, which has been identified as a lion. The inscription is classified as being carved in runestone style RAK, which is the oldest style. This is the classification for inscriptions where the end of the text bands are straight, and there are no attached serpent or beast heads. The inscription is believed to have been carved after the date of the Jelling stones were completed.

The Skårby 1 runestone is listed as DR 280 in the Rundata catalog. A Danish catalog number is used as Scania during the Viking Age, which was part of the historic area of Denmark. The stone was originally located at the Skårby church but has been moved to the Kulturen museum in Lund.

The inscription states that Tumi owned Guðissnapi, which today is the nearby village of Gusnava.

=== Inscription ===
==== Transliteration of the runes into Latin characters ====
× kaulfʀ × auk × autiʀ × þaʀ × sautu × stain × þans(i) × aftiʀ × tuma × bruþur × sia × ¶ i(ʀ) ati × ku¶þis×snab¶n ×

==== Transcription into Old Norse ====
Káulfr/Kalfr ok Autir þeir settu stein þenna eptir Tuma, bróður sinn, er átti Guðissnapa.

==== Translation in English ====
Káulfr(?)/Kalfr(?) and Autir, they placed this stone in memory of Tumi, their brother, who owned Guðissnapi.

== Skårby 2 ==
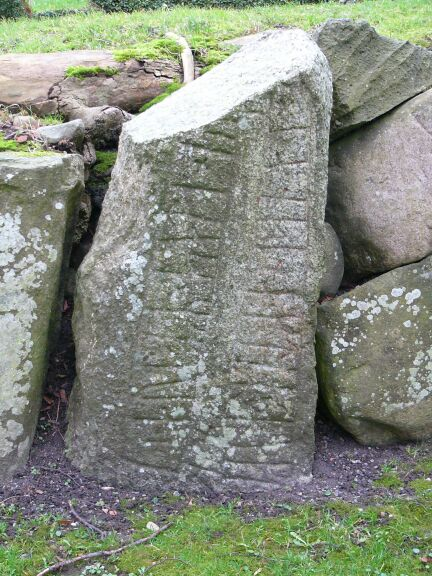
The Skårby 2 runestone.

The Skårby 2 runestone is listed as DR 281 in the Rundata catalog and consists of runic text in a band that runs along the sides of the stone. It is 1.2 meters in height and is made of granite. Similar to Skårby 1, it is classified as being carved in runestone style RAK and dated after the date of the Jelling stones. It is located in the churchyard of the Skårby church.

=== Inscription ===
==== Transliteration of the runes into Latin characters ====
× autiʀ × sati × s(t)(a)(i)n × þansi × aftiʀ × haku¶n

==== Transcription into Old Norse ====
Autir setti stein þenna eptir Hákon.

==== Translation in English ====
Autir placed this stone in memory of Hákon.
