= Georg J:son Karlin =

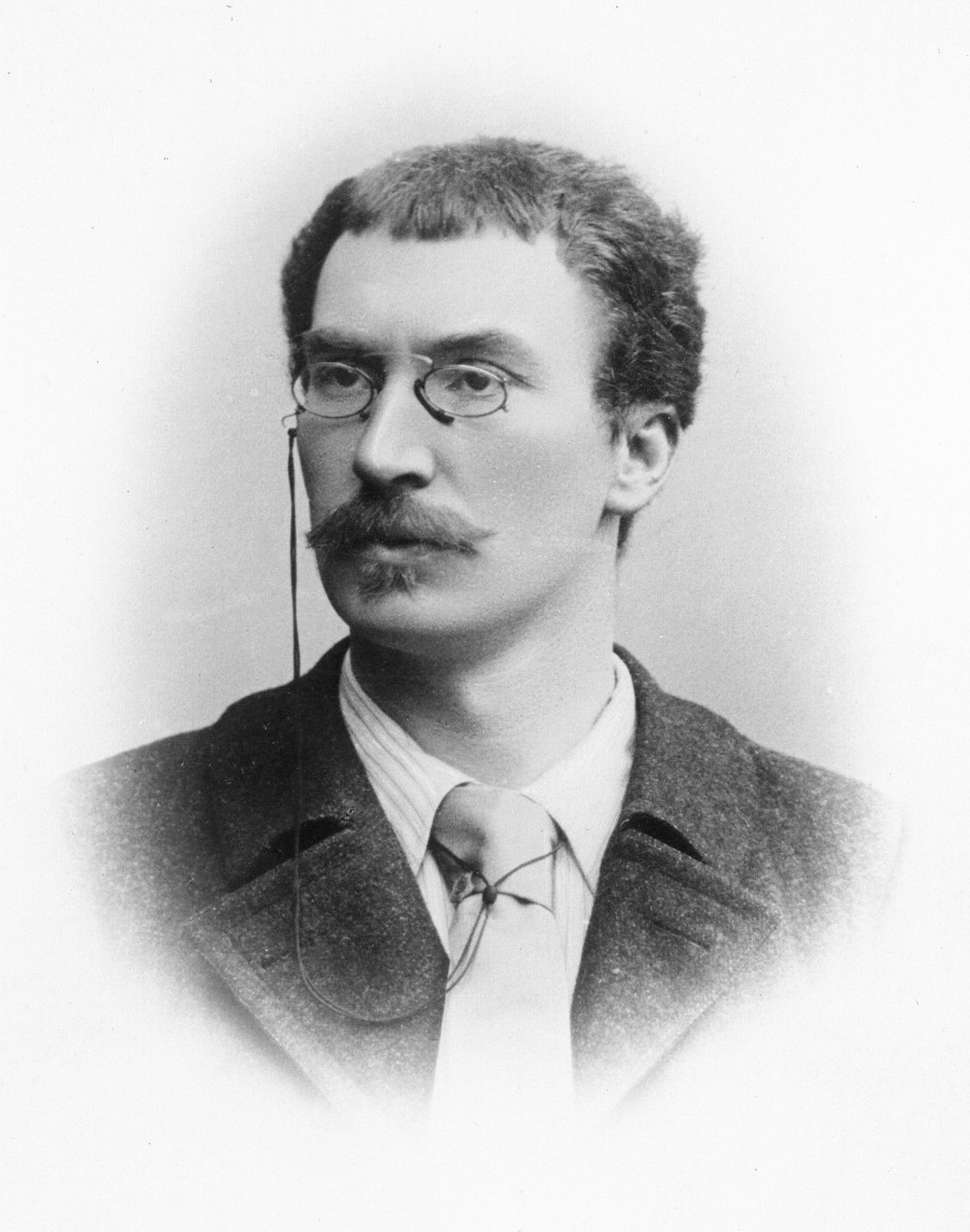
A young Georg J:son Karlin

Georg Fredrik Johansson (J:son) Karlin (29 April 1859 – 15 May 1939) was the founder of the Kulturen open-air museum in Lund, Sweden.

== Biography ==
Georg Karlin was born at Huaröd in Norra Åkarp, in Kristianstad Municipality, Skåne County, Sweden. He was the son of Pastor Lars Peter Johansson and Karolina Kristina Nilsson. He passed matriculation at the University of Lund during 1879. He was married twice. In 1896 with Anna Clara Maria Forsell (1869-1898) and in 1904 to Gurli Hedvig Maria Ström.

Karlin had observed old agrarian society give way to industrial society. He tried to save part of the folk culture by beginning to save the buildings, equipment, furniture and clothes associated with the old folk culture. Kulturen museum was founded by Georg Karlin in 1882. He was its director until 1933. His work has resulted in a huge and unique collection of more than two million items at Kulturen, the second largest open-air museum in Sweden.

== Selected works ==
- Kulturhistoriska museets Östarp. Dess natur, historia och ändamål (Lund: Håkan Ohlssons Boktryckeri. 1924)

== Other sources ==
- Fjelner, Alfred (1935) Skånska mannar från Lund (Stockholm: Hugo Gebers Förlag) Swedish
