= Kulturen =

Open-air museum in Lund, Sweden

Coordinates: 55°42′16.5″N 13°11′47″E

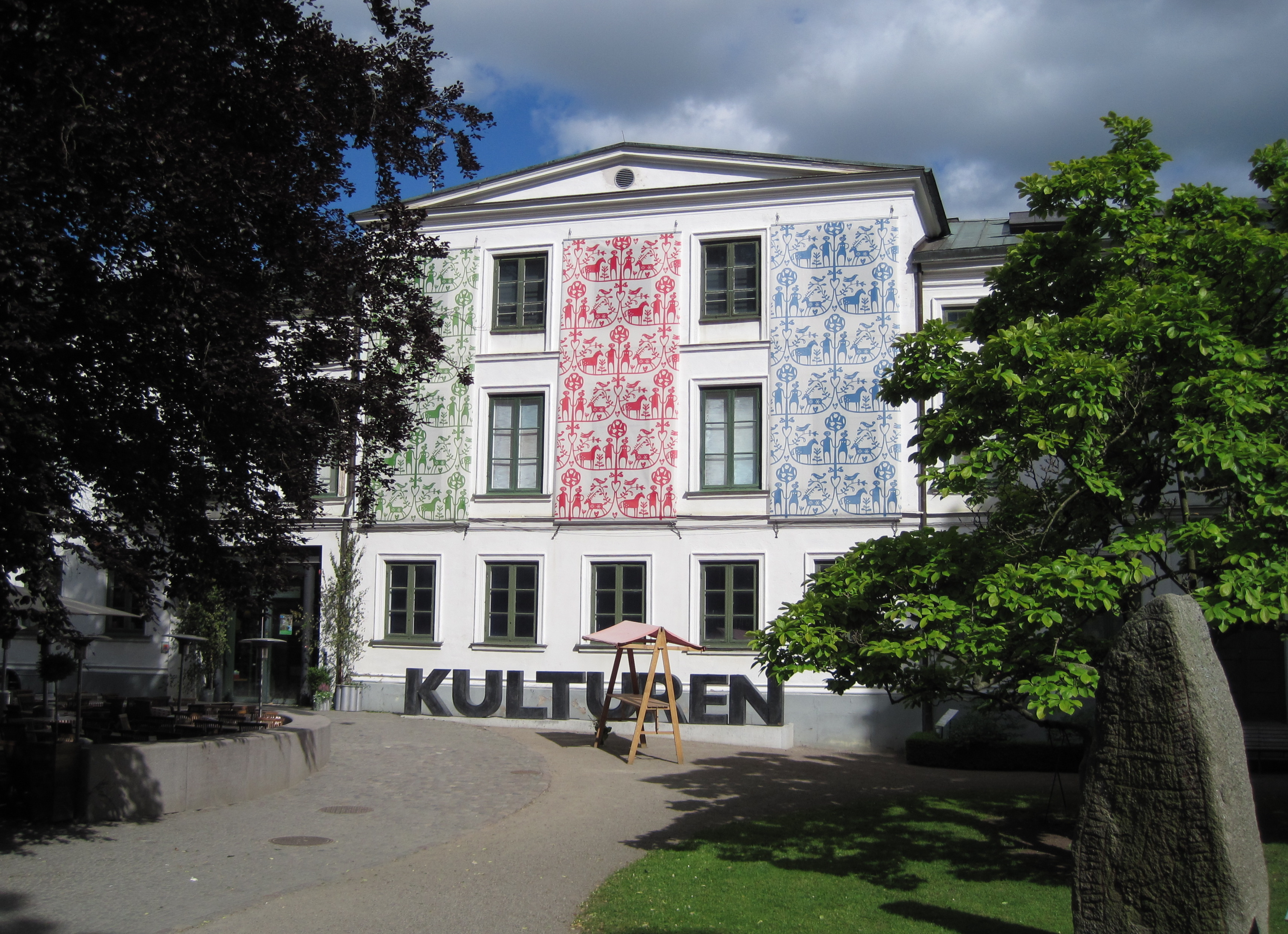
Vita huset, Kulturen's main building

Kulturen (Swedish: [kɵlˈtʉ̌ːrɛn]) is an open-air museum as well as a museum of cultural history in Lund, Sweden. Occupying two blocks in central Lund, Kulturen is Sweden's and the world's second oldest open-air museum after Skansen in Stockholm. It contains historic buildings, dating from the Middle Ages to the 1930s, set in gardens or cobblestone streets. The museum displays around 20 exhibitions with themes ranging from medieval archaeology to 20th century fashion. The museum collections include art and design, archaeology, photography, crafts, and ethnography. The Museum is managed by Kulturhistoriska föreningen för södra Sverige.

== History ==
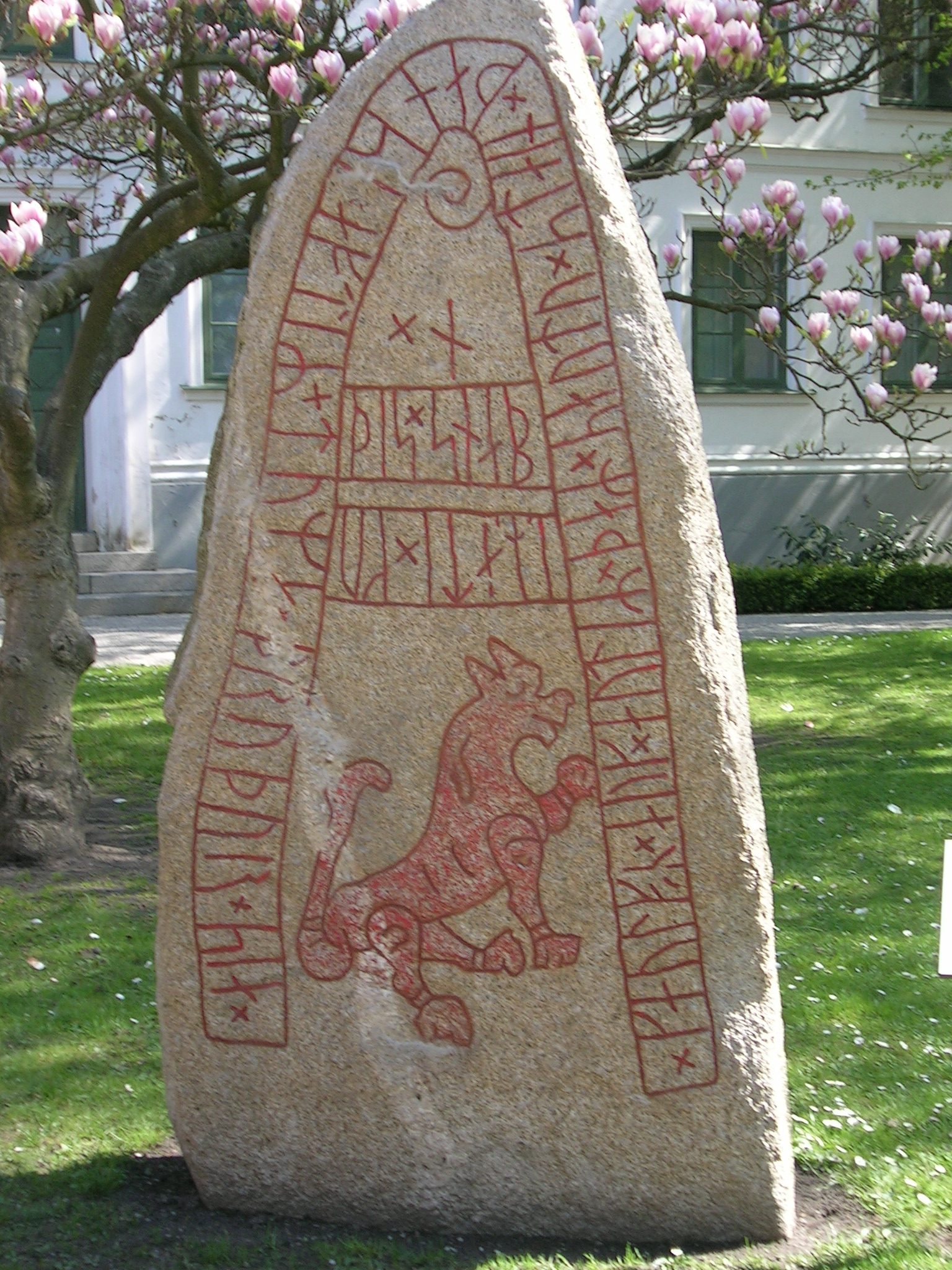
Skårby Runestones

In the late 19th century, Swedish society was characterised by National Romantic visions of an idyllic rural community. As more and more people migrated to cities, concern grew that traditions, ways of life and crafts would be lost. The result was the emergence of a movement to safeguard knowledge and artefacts. It was against this backdrop that the Association for the Cultural History of Southern Sweden (Kulturhistoriska föreningen för södra Sverige), was established in 1882. The museum "Kulturhistoriska museet", founded among others by local historian Georg Karlin (1859–1939) opened on 21 October 1882 in Kungshuset. Karlin was a contemporary of Arthur Hazelius who had opened the open-air museum Skansen just a year before. Skansen had become the model for other open-air museums in Northern Europe.

The association initially ran museum-like activities in several different premises around Lund. Kulturen's open-air museum opened on 7 September 1892 in its current location in the heart of Lund, near the historic Lund Cathedral. It's the main building, which dates from the early 19th century, came to be known as the Nobleman's House. Both a farmhouse and a church were also relocated to the museum's grounds. Together with the Burgher's House, these buildings represented the four estates: the nobility, the clergy, the burghers and the peasants.

When the City of Lund began to lay a new sewer system in 1890, the workers unexpectedly uncovered a treasure trove of artifacts dating from the Middle Ages. Kulturen bought the artifacts and, about the same time, undertook organised archaeological excavations of their own. In 1909, it was decided that all finds and remnants in the city of Lund would be curated at Kulturen. The museum's first-ever artifact was acquired on Midsummer's Day, 24 June 1882. It is a silver goblet, used as a shot glass, made in Växjö in 1782 by the goldsmith Axel Johan Limnell. Today, the museum's collection consists of around 250,000 artifacts of cultural and historical value, 500,000 photographs and 1 million archaeological finds.

The open-air museum gradually expanded in the decades around 1900. Some of these additions reflected the way of life in the countryside, while others were examples of urban environments. Many of the buildings have been relocated from different parts of southern Sweden, others still stand on their original sites and continue to serve as typical features of Lund's broader cityscape.

As an arts and crafts college located within a museum, Kulturen's former School of Handicrafts was something quite unique. The college operated from 1896 until the early 1930s offered training in forging, textile handicraft, ceramics and furniture design. Here students learned to fashion new objects based on time-honoured materials.

In 1924, through the purchase of the Östarp estate 25 km east of Lund, Kulturen could display a farmhouse with an enclosed courtyard typical of Scania.

An entire city block was added to the open-air museum in 1926 and in 1929. Vita huset, which was built in 1854, was officially opened as the museum's new main building.

There is always hustle and bustle at Kulturen in Lund with a wide-ranging programme of activities for all ages. Kulturen in Lund also celebrates several festivals and traditions that attract many visitors, such as Easter, the National Day, Midsummer's Eve, Culture Night and Night of Ghosts. The Christmas season at Kulturen starts the first weekend of Advent with a large Christmas fair (Julstöket).

Several runestones are displayed outside the museum, including the Dalby and Dagstorp runestones.

== Museum directors ==
- Georg J:son Karlin 1882-1934
- Sven T. Kjellberg 1934-1961
- Bengt Bengtsson 1961-1977
- Eva Nordenson 1977-1982
- Anders W. Mårtensson 1982-1993
- Margareta Alin Hegelund 1993-2007
- Anki Dahlin 2007-2017
- Gustav Ohlsson 2017-

== See also ==
- Tegnérmuseet

== Gallery ==
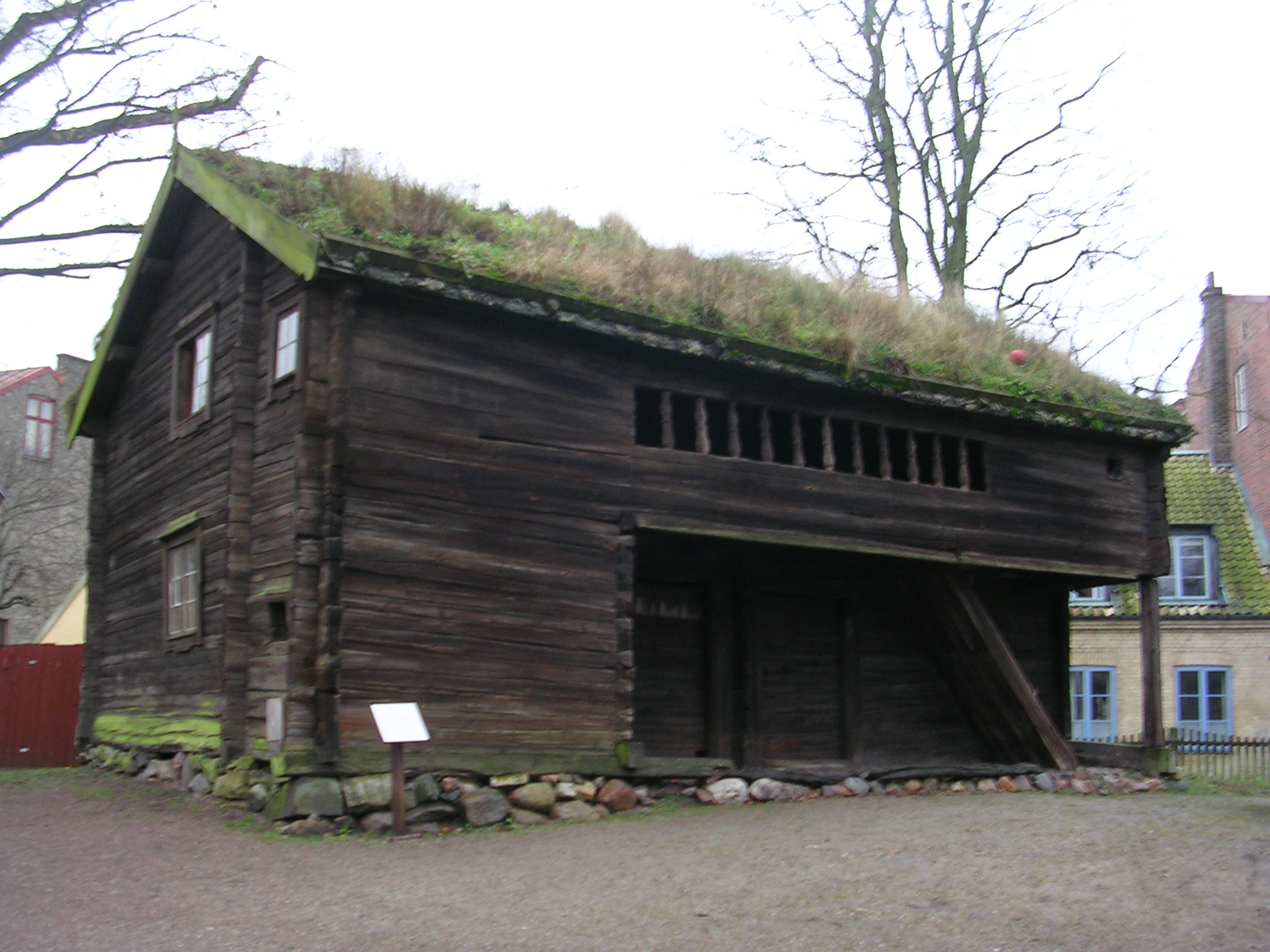
Måcketorpsboden (Timbered house)

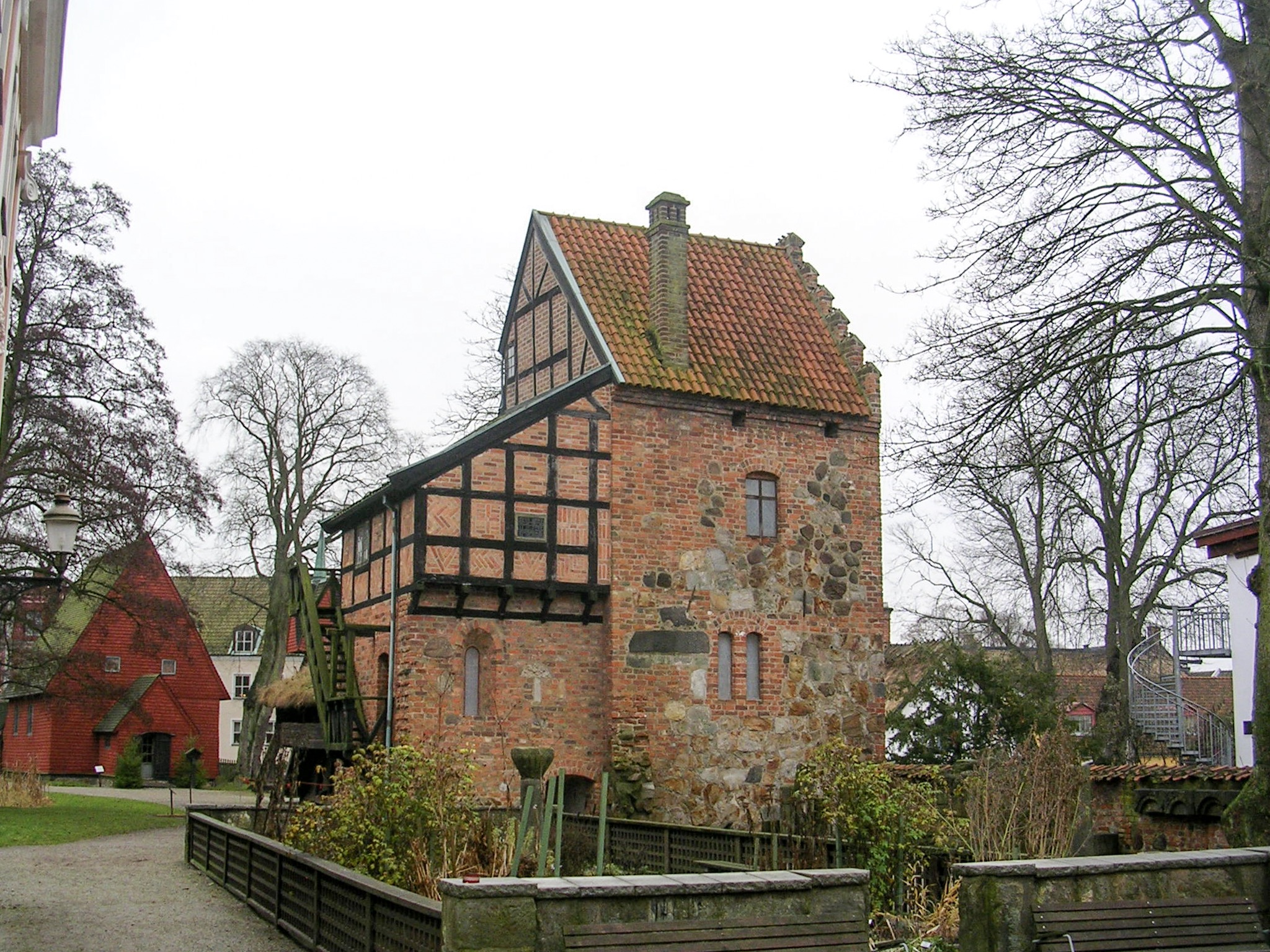
Dekanhuset (Dean's house)

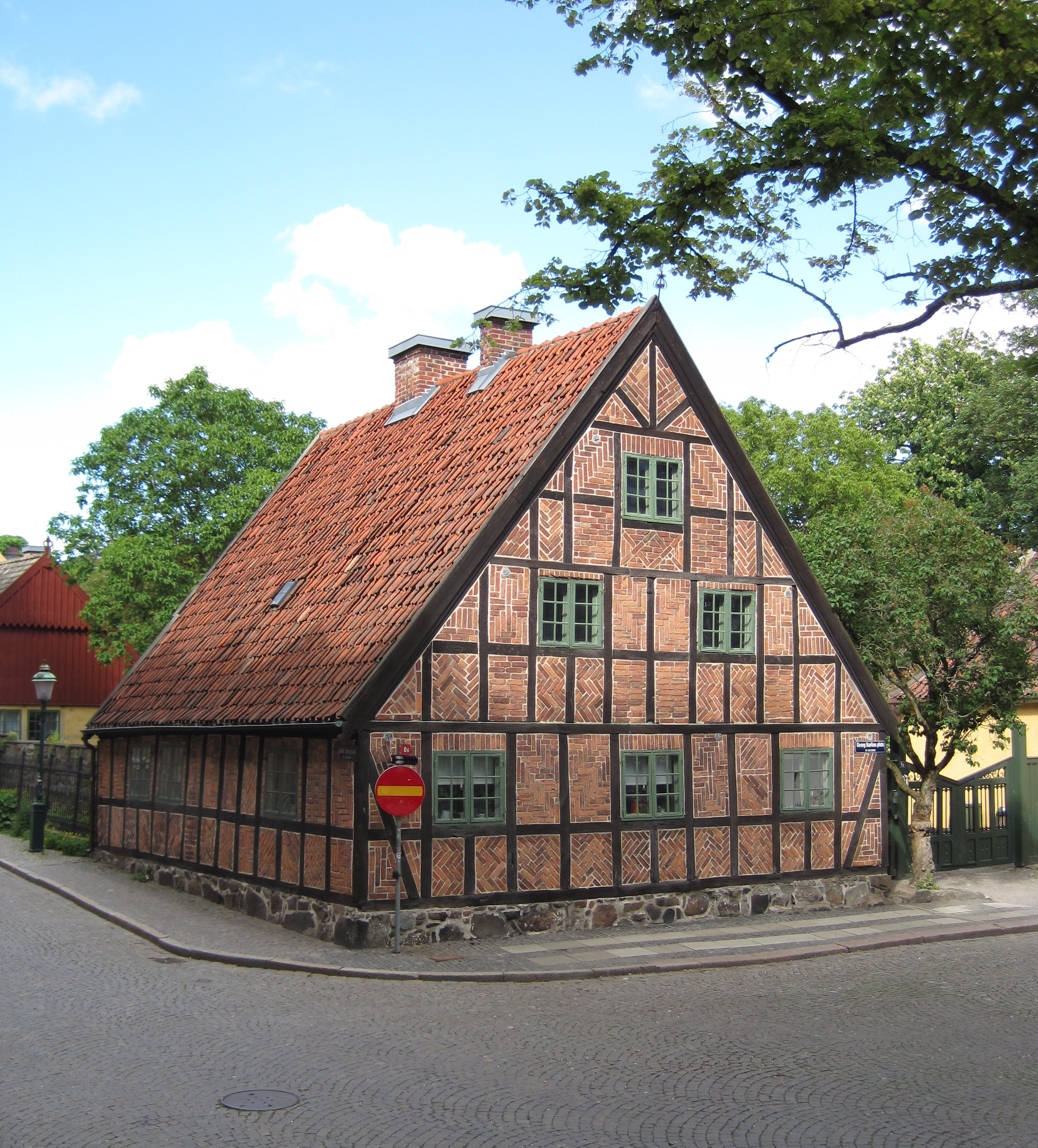
Locus Peccatorum (Former student barracks)

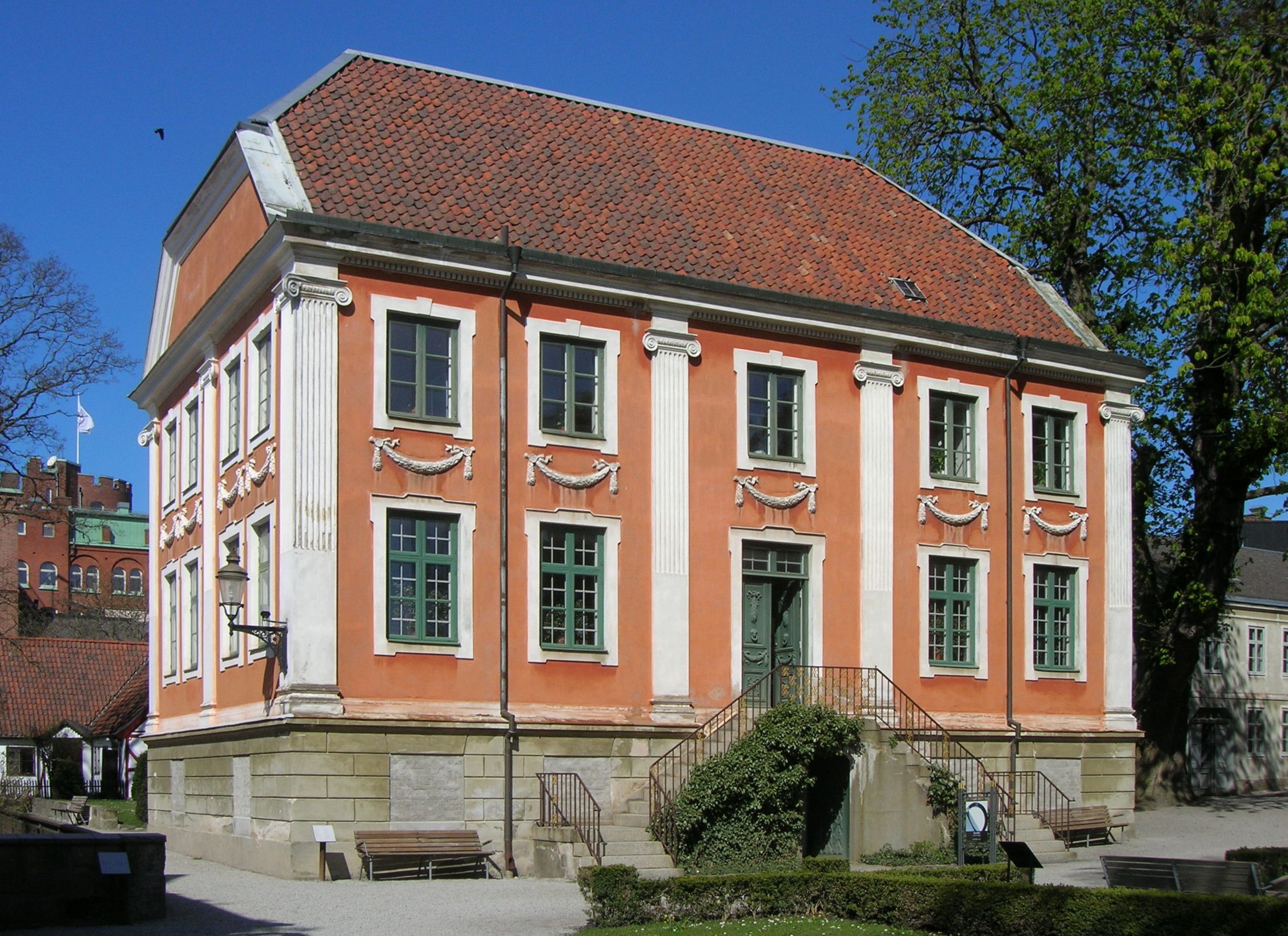
Herrehuset (Manor house)

== Other sources ==
- Karlin, G.J. (1924) Kulturhistoriska museets Östarp. Dess natur, historia och ändamål (Lund: Håkan Ohlssons Boktryckeri)
- Bengtsson, Bengt (1963) Östarp som turistmål. Kulturen 1962 (Lund: Kulturhistoriska föreningen för södra Sverige)
- Mårtensson, M. (1963) Bondens trädgård. Kulturen 1962 (Lund: Kulturhistoriska föreningen för södra Sverige)
